= Battle of Mulleriyawa =

Sri Lankan battle

- Part of Sinhalese–Portuguese War
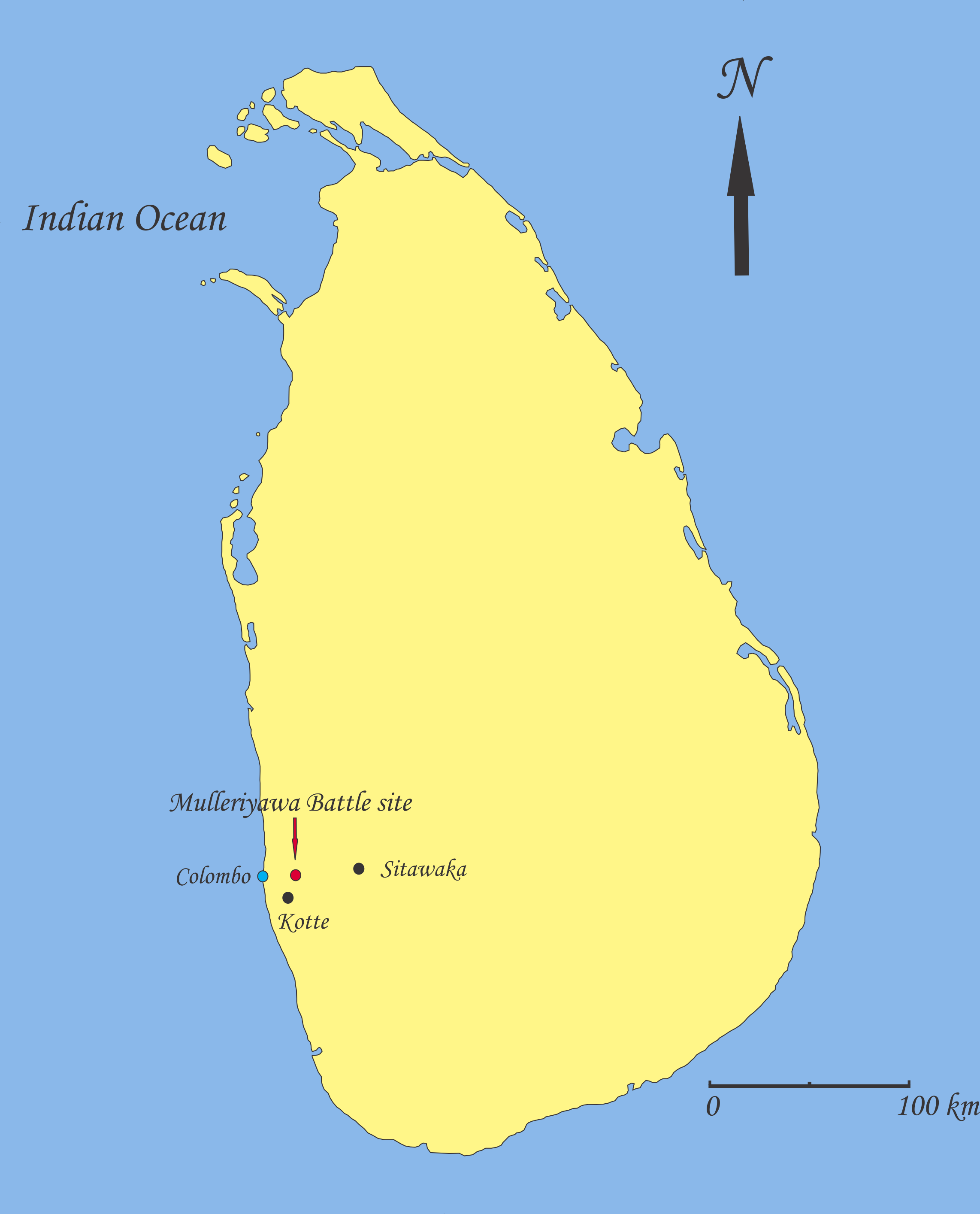
- Mulleriyawa battle site
Date	1559
Location	Mulleriyawa, Outside Colombo on the southern bank of the Kelani River 06°56′10.79″N 79°56′53.64″E
Result	Sitawaka victory

Belligerents
Kingdom of Sitawaka	Portuguese Empire: Lascarins (local soldiers on the Portuguese side); Supported by: Kingdom of Kotte

Commanders and leaders
Mayadunne; Battle commanded by: Tikiri Bandara; Wickramasinghe Mudali	(Portuguese Empire) Captain major Jorge de Menezes

Strength
4,000 Sitawaka men Unknown number of militia Unknown number of war elephants Small number of cavalry	Unknown

Casualties and losses
around 500 Sitawakans	1,600 Portuguese and Lascarins, several of the Kotte men and officers

The Battle of Mulleriyawa (Sinhala: මුල්ලේරියාව සටන) in 1559 was part of the Sinhalese–Portuguese War. It was one of the most decisive battles in Sri Lankan history and considered as the worst defeat of the Portuguese during that period. According to local chronicles, the marshlands of Mulleriyawa turned red with blood after the annihilation of the Portuguese. With this victory, Sitawaka emerged as a military power which was able to challenge the Portuguese expansion.

== Background ==
Portuguese arrived in Sri Lanka in 1505 and established trade relations with kingdom of Kotte. They erected a fortress in Colombo and garrisoned it.

In 1521, King Vijayabahu VI's three sons mutinied against their father. They ousted him, had him assassinated, and divided the kingdom among themselves, leading to the events which known as “Spoiling/Sack of Vijayabahu” (Vijayaba Kollaya). The eldest son, Buvanekabahu VII received Kotte with the sea board and ruled with the title of emperor. The second son received the principality of Raigama and ruled under the name of King Raigam Bandara. The youngest son, who masterminded the mutiny, received the kingdom of Sitawaka and ruled as King Mayadunne Bandara.

With Raigam Bandara's death in 1538 Mayadunne annexed the principality of Raigama and invaded Kotte. Bhuvanekabahu VII, with the help of Portuguese, defeated Mayadunne's invading forces, eventually paving the way to an uneasy peace between two kingdoms.

While the Portuguese wanted to conduct a full-scale offensive against Sitawaka, Bhuvanekabahu VII did not support their cause; he only wanted Portuguese help for defensive purposes. After Bhuvanekabahu's death in 1551, his Catholic grandson, Dharmapala succeeded the Kotte throne. However, he was more or less a puppet king under Portuguese influence. At this time King Mayadunne was raiding the Kotte border and extending Sitawakan sphere of influence.. In the same way Sitawaka sought the help of the Zamorin of Calicut for naval assistance

After the unsuccessful siege of Kotte from 1557 to 1558 by Mayadunne, the Portuguese laid plans to invade Sitawaka.

=== Date of encounter and the commander of Portuguese ===
It is widely accepted that a Portuguese army led by Captain-Major Afonso Pereira de Lacerda was defeated by Sitawakan forces at Mulleriyawa in the year of 1562. But Portuguese sources provide a different picture.

Pereira de Lacerda was suffering from chronic malaria which almost reduced him to a state of delirium. So Goa sent a veteran commander named Jorge de Menezes (nicknamed Baroche for his exploits at the city of Broach which lies in the bay of Cambaya) to take over. He took over the office in year 1559 and claimed that he intend to finish the enemy that brought him to the island. De Menezes marched out triggering the events that eventually led to the battle of Mulleriyawa.

De Menezes held the office of captain-major of Portuguese Ceylon from 1559 to 1560 which places the battle sometime after May 1559 and at the same time questions the above date (1562).

== Movement to battle ==
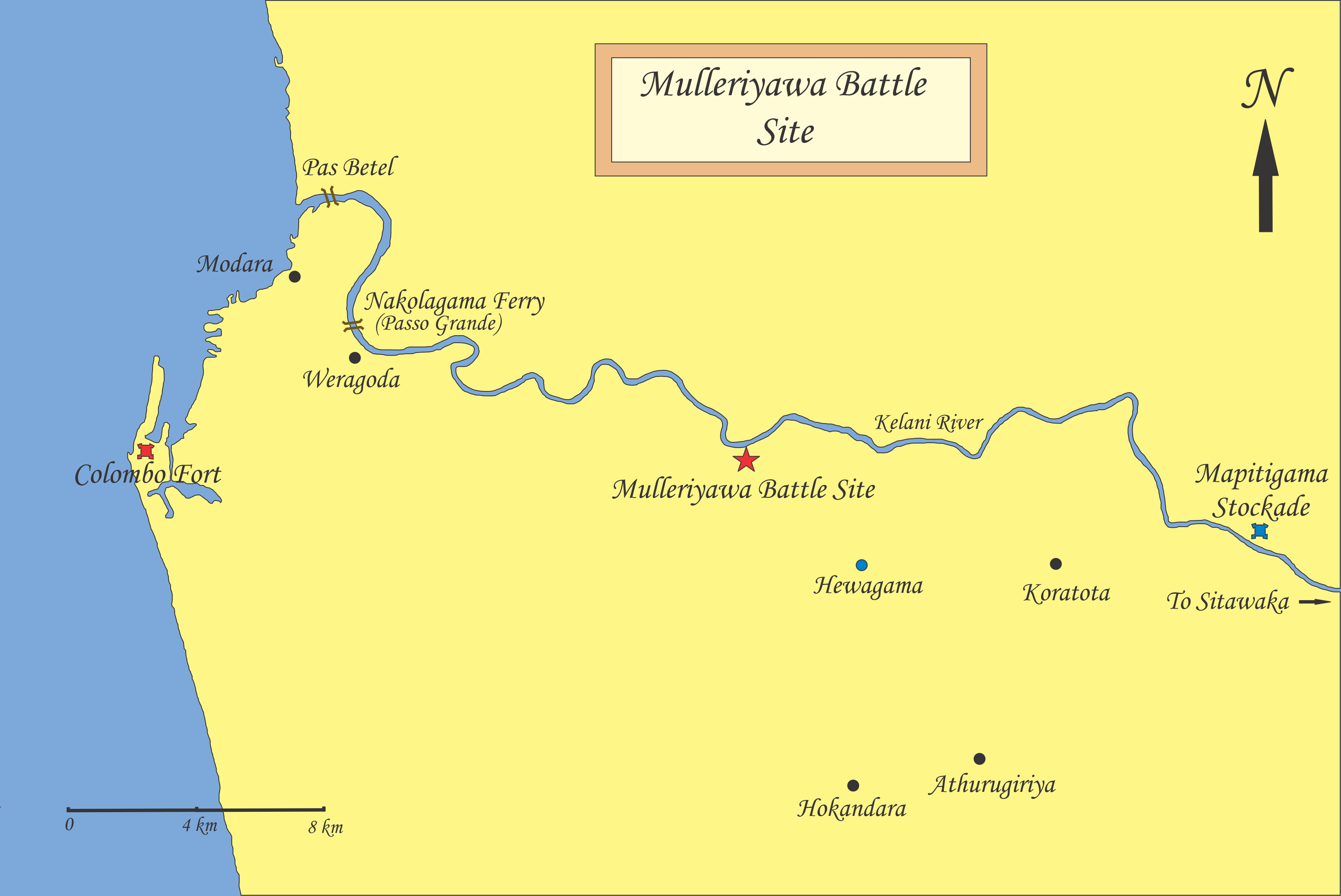
Mulleriyawa Battle Site and other important locations in relation to the Kelani River

The Portuguese advanced along the southern bank of the Kelani River through Maedanda and Weragoda towards Mulleriyawa. Their objective was to capture Mapitigama stockade which was located on the northern bank. It was strategically located (current day Udumapitigama) controlling the river and land route to Sitawaka. Therefore, by capturing it the Portuguese expected to use it as a launching pad for the coming invasion.

King Mayadunne received the news of this invasion force and sent an army under the command of his son Tikiri Bandara towards Hewagama. On arrival, he summoned the military caste of Aturigiri Korale, Hewagam Korale, Koratota, and Hokandara areas to further bolster his numbers. Surprisingly, previously fierce enemies of Kingdom of Sitawaka, the Maggona Arachchi junior, sons of late General Maggona Arachchi, joined with Sithawaka forces to completely destroy the armies of Portugal and their Sri Lankan supporters, It is believed that after the fall of the Kingdom of Kotte with the Veediya Bandara's son, Dharmapala of Kotte, Maggona fighters were desperate about the country and the nation.

Meanwhile, a Portuguese detachment under Jorge de Menezes and Jorge de Melo successfully surprised the retreating Sitawakan border guards in a sneak attack at dawn. They captured a smaller stockade on the southern bank, killing the garrison of 300 men. Encouraged by this early success, de Menezes prepared his forces to capture the grand stockade of Mapitigama. At this moment, he received reports of Sitawakan forces in a meadow (Hewagama) and ordered a night march.

Tikiri Bandara was aware of the movements of de Menezes and de Melo, and sent a force under Wickramasinghe Mudali to check their advance. These armies met at the village of Mulleriyawa one hour before dawn.

== 1st battle of Mulleriyawa ==
The battle was short and the Sitawakans were defeated. They retreated towards Hewagama leaving 200 dead, pursued by the Portuguese. Wickramasinghe Mudali was himself wounded. Jorge de Menezes wanted to annihilate the Sitawakans and pressed the pursuit.

Retreating Sitawakan forces took refuge in a narrow pass which had been fortified earlier. De Menezes ordered to attack the fortified pass. But now reorganized and well entrenched, Wickramasinghe Mudali managed to repulse repeated waves of attacks.

These futile efforts exhausted the Portuguese and consumed their ammunition reserves.

De Menezes renewed the attack, but his men withdrew against his orders to hold back. Exhausted and low on ammunition they were forced to rest at the village of Mulleriyawa.

== 2nd battle of Mulleriyawa ==
As soon as the news was received, Prince Tikiri Bandara, determined to destroy the enemy once and for all, divided his forces into three groups. The first group consisted of militia men from Athurugiriya, Hewagama, Koratota, Hokandara, and 1000 Sitawakan swordsmen with targes. He sent them in a flanking maneuver to cut off enemy's retreat and to attack in the rear.

Then he reinforced Wickramasinghe Mudali's remaining forces with elephants and elite targe bearers and deployed them in left and right wings. Their exact role is not known but probably their orders were to secure flanks and to stand by as reserves.

Finally, Tikiri Bandara deployed the remaining targe bearers, war elephants, Sinhalese musketeers, and cavalry in the center and assumed the command himself.

Meanwhile, the Portuguese found their rear blocked by large trees and the enemy close by, they drew up themselves (arranged in battle ranks) in an open area at Mulleriyawa. (Rajavaliya is specific about the fact that Sitawaka forces attacked the enemy army in formations)

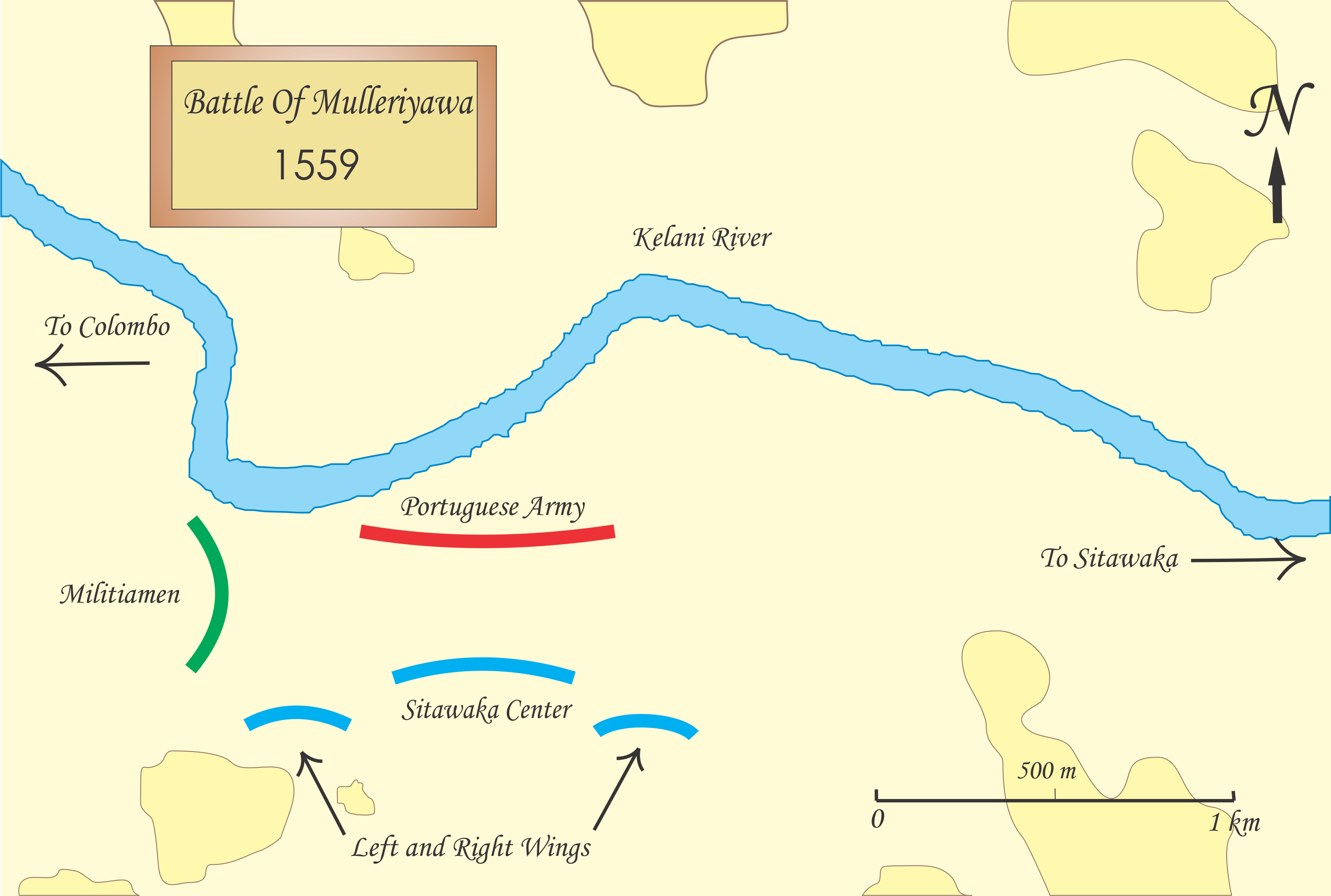
Battle of Mulleriyawa - Troop Disposition

The 16 year old prince Tikiri Bandara mounted on a horse, led the center on a full frontal attack. His force was arranged in divisions (Jayasundara division, Vijayasundara division), but the targe bearers, war elephants, and horses charged mingled together to prevent Portuguese from reloading their muskets. Targe bearers advanced under the cover of the elephants to avoid fire. At the same time the mixed force of militia and targe bearers attacked from the rear and flank and joined the fight.

The flanking maneuver worked and the war elephants broke through the Portuguese ranks. The battle soon became an intense melee; unable to reload, the Portuguese had to use their muskets as clubs. The intensity of the battle described in Portuguese sources by accounts of men trying to stop elephants with banner staffs, and a soldier attempting to bite a Sinhalese with his teeth when he lost his weapons.

Tikiri Bandara rode throughout the battle line, encouraging men to continuously press the attack and to close the gaps. Once the Portuguese managed to retreat through a gap in the line and found that Sitawakan forces hurrying on to the next pass to cut off their retreat again.

The Portuguese had almost given up themselves when something unexpected happened. A soldier named António Dias de Lomba fired a berço cannon (canhão de berço – breech loading swivel gun usually used for grape shots) which had been abandoned in the field. The shot fell among a line of Sitawakan soldiers. It must have shocked the Sitawaka forces because they stopped attacking. Taking advantage of the lull, the Portuguese managed to retreat through a wood. Although the Sitawakans were no longer pressing the attack, Portuguese sources provide names of 6 soldiers which were killed in this wood by Sitawaka forces using musket fire alone. Some Portuguese soldiers retreated using boats.

Those who escaped found refuge in the smaller stockade which they captured in the early part of campaign. However, many were wounded and their pride has shaken.

== Casualties ==
According to Rajavaliya, 1,600 Portuguese and Lascarins besides several Kotte men and officers were felled. But both Portuguese and local sources are silent regarding the number of Sitawaka casualties.

== Legacy ==
After the battle, Tikiri Bandara sent for the Arachchies of Koratota, Hewagama, Korale and Hokanrdara, rewarding them for their vital charge against the Portuguese rear. He also bestowed the new name "Hewagama" (also called Hewakam or Hewapanne) upon a Korale general due to his service during the battle; his previous name has not survived in the historical records.

The Arachchi of Koratota was gifted Bandara's personal sword, and to this day his descendants still maintain the weapon in their possession, using in to practise the martial art of angampora. All angampora-practising warriors from Maggona who had previously served under the Kingdom of Kotte were issued pardons by Bandara, and were ordered by him to relocate from Maggona to the kingdom's borders to guard its frontiers, including the Homagama region. The Arachchies of Maggona abandoned their previous duty of protecting the Maggona fort due to Dharmapala of Kotte's betrayals and decision to grant the Kingdom of Kotte to his proteges via a deed. Eventually, many Sinhalese changed their names to Portuguese ones, but continued to observe Buddhism and Sinhalese culture.

Names of two war elephants; “Viridudassaya” of Jayasundara division who captured an enemy standard and “Airavana” of Vijayasundara division who captured a shield and a chain appear in chronicles.

== 2nd campaign for Mapitigama stockade ==
After the victory Tikiri Bandara promptly fortified the area with moats and ramps. He built two forts at Kadudevola (present-day Ran-kadudevola, Kaduwela) and Raggahawatta and armed them with cannons. Before retiring back to Sitawaka, he organized raiding sorties along the river towards Portuguese held area to lay waste.

After three months, the Portuguese were reinforced by fresh troops from Goa and launched a three pronged attack towards the Mapitigama stockade. This time they sent a force along the northern bank through the Siyane Korale, another force along the southern bank, and a fortified paddle boat called “Kattala” (? Couple) along the river.

“Kattala” was built in Modara area, by lashing together two river barges called Padavs (Padawwa in Sinhala). Then they fortified it with a palisade which was built using coconut trunks. They armed it with fire bombs, rogeyra cannons (regular cannons), and 40 sailors and Lascarins. It was also carrying gunpowder, provisions, and weapons.

Upon receiving the news Tikiri Bandara arrived at Raggahawatta. He dragged two field pieces to the river, ordered to lower them to the bank, and mounted the cannons at water level well hidden from the approaching enemy. When the Kattala drew near, the cannons opened raking fire. A shot went from prow to stern killing 20 sailors. The boat started to leak and floated down river.

Meanwhile, Wickramasinghe Mudali attacked the northern Portuguese force from the direction of Siyane Korale and pursued them. He finally defeated them at Nakolagama ferry (It was the larger of two ferries across the Kelani River and Portuguese called it “Passo Grande”; current day Grand pass). He went back to King Mayadunne on the shoulders of a captured Portuguese soldier.

Receiving news of the defeat, the southern land force withdrew back to Colombo.

== Locations today ==
Following suggestions are based on research of historian Dr C Gaston Perera but these places not been verified archaeologically. 1).Mapatigama Stockade – High ground closer to the northern bank of Kelani River at Ranala – Udumapitigama ferry. 2).Raggahawatta Fort – a rise still bears the name Raggahavatta by the riverside in the Kaduwela area. Under it, the river bank still bears traces of embankment which was used for cannons that attacked the “kattala”. 3).Mulleriyawela Battle site – Levallavatta area between Ambatale and Kelani River.

== Aftermath ==
This was one of the few pitched battles between the Portuguese and the Sinhalese. The Portuguese became extremely weak within their area and the threat to Sitawaka from this direction ceased. Emboldened by this victory, Mayadunne and Tikiri Bandara conducted frequent attacks against the Portuguese and the Kotte Kingdom. By 1565 the Portuguese were unable to hold the capital city of Kotte. They abandoned Kotte and moved to Colombo (which was guarded by a powerful fort and the Portuguese navy) with their puppet King Dharmapala.

== 450th Anniversary of the Battle of Mulleriyawa ==
Angampora Fighters from Korathota Arachchi who fought for this historical battle was staged night of 2012-08-23 on the banks of Mulleriyawa lake to commemorate the 450th anniversary of the victory at the battle of Mulleriyawa. Angam specialist Ajantha Mahantharachchi(Former known as Ajanta Perera - A formerly Catholic Karate Master and a self proclaimed Angam Master ) and his students presented a dramatization of the indigenous fighting tradition along with a religious ceremony, to pay respect and immortalize the warriors of the legendary battle of 1562. A website including historical background of this great piece of land was launched at the sametime. by Minister Ranjith Siyambalapitiyaon this memorial day.

== See also ==
- Siege of Kotte (1557-1558)
