= Nikapitiye Bandara =

King of Sitawaka from 1593 to 1594

Nikapitiye Bandara නිකපිටියේ බණ්ඩාර

King of Sitawaka
- Reign: 1593–1594
- Coronation: 1593
- Predecessor: Rajasuriya
- Successor: Jayavira Bandara Mudali (de facto); Fall of Sitawaka to Kotte Kingdom and Portuguese Empire
- Regent: Jayavira Bandara Mudali
- Born: c. 1588; Kingdom of Sitawaka
- Died: 1608 or 1611; Lisbon, Portugal
- House: House of Siri Sanga Bo
- Religion: Theravada Buddhism (formerly); Roman Catholicism

Nikapitiye Bandara (Sinhala: නිකපිටියේ බණ්ඩාර), was the king of Sitawaka in 1593. After the death of King Rajasuriya, Veediya Bandara's queen Samudra devi, gave the kingship to her son Nikapitaye Bandara. Aritta Kivendu (Jayavira Bandara Mudali) was also appointed as general of this king. However, Nikapitiye soon fled in fear of his general Aritta Kivendu, who had brought a Portuguese army against him out of state greed.

Although Nikapitiya Bandara took an army from Anuradhapura and fought against the Portuguese, he was unable to capture the kingdom. It is said that after him the area of Sitawaka came under control of the Portuguese Empire.

Nikapitiye Bandara Born: ? 1588 Died: 1606/1611
Regnal titles
Preceded by Mayadunne	King of Sitawaka; 1593–1594	Succeeded by Dharmapala (Kingdom of Sitawaka annexed by the Kingdom of Kotte and Portuguese Empire)
