= Rajasuriya =

King of Sitawaka from 1592 to 1593

Rajasuriya රාජසූරිය

King of Sitawaka
- Reign: 1592–1593
- Predecessor: Rajasinha I
- Successor: Nikapitiye Bandara
- House: House of Siri Sanga Bo
- Father: Rajasinha I

Rajasuriya (Sinhala: රාජසූරිය), was King of Sitawaka in the late sixteenth century, who ruled from 1593 to 1594. He was the son of Rajasinha I and grandson of Mayadunne. He succeeded Rajasinha I as king of Sitawaka and was succeeded by Nikapitiye Bandara. His brief reign occurred during the decline of the Kingdom of Sitawaka.

Rajasuriya Born: ? ? Died: 1593
Regnal titles
Preceded by Rajasinha I	King of Sitawaka; 1592–1593	Succeeded by Nikapitiye Bandara
