= Kingdom of Raigama =

Sinhalese kingdom on the island of Sri Lanka from 1521 to 1538

Kingdom of Raigama රයිගම රාජධානිය
- 1521–1538
- Flag of Raigama (1521-1538)

- Kingdom of Raigama in 1521
- Capital: Raigampura
- Common languages: Sinhala
- Religion: Theravada Buddhism
- Government: Monarchy
- King
  - 1521–1538: Pararajasinha
- Historical era: Transitional period
  - Vijayabā Kollaya: 1521
  - Death of Pararajasinha: 1538
- Currency: Gold and Silver Panama
Preceded by	Succeeded by
Kingdom of Kotte	Kingdom of Sitawaka

The Kingdom of Raigama (Sinhala: රයිගම රාජධානිය) was a short-lived Sinhalese kingdom located in the southwestern region of Sri Lanka. It came into existence following the Vijayabā Kollaya of 1521, a violent palace coup that resulted in the fragmentation of the Kingdom of Kotte.

Established by its only ruler Pararajasinha, Raigama occupied a strategic yet fragile middle ground amidst the escalating power struggle between a Portuguese-backed Kotte and the expansionist Kingdom of Sitawaka. Following Pararajasinha's death without heirs in 1538, the kingdom lost its independent status when his brother, Mayadunne of Sitawaka, annexed the territory, significantly strengthening Sitawaka's geopolitical position during the Crisis of the Sixteenth Century.

== Name ==
Raigama is referred to by names such as ‘Rajaggama’ and ‘Raigraama’. The city of Raigama is described in the Mayura Sandeshaya. It is said to have been the capital for 68 years, until Parakramabahu VI moved to the comforts of Jayawardhanapura (Sri Jayawardenepura Kotte) in 1415.

== Location ==
The lands of the Kingdom of Raigama was originally established by Nissanka Alagakkonara in the 14th century. The ancient text known as the “Alakeshwara Yuddhaya” (Battle of Alakeshwara) records that, at that time, the minister Alakeshwara ruled Raigama, Buvanekabahu ruled from Gampola, and Chakravarti kings held sway over Jaffna. Subsequently, the region was ruled by several members of the Alakeshwara lineage. History also records that during this period, King Aryachakravarti of Jaffna began collecting taxes from these areas.

== History ==
=== Background ===
The Portuguese first arrived in Sri Lanka in 1505 but left, later returning and constructing a fort in Colombo in 1518 and established trade relations with the Kotte kingdom. During the early 16th century their intentions were directed towards defending their trading interests, particularly the lucrative spice trade. However, with time this policy gradually changed to territorial ambitions with the objective of outright conquest. The island's resources, Sri Lanka's strategic location for both trade and naval security and rise of the Mughal Empire in India influenced this change. (Note: The rise of the Mughal empire led to an increase in efforts on Sri Lanka by the Portuguese, as evident by a claim made by Lisbon. "If someday India should be lost it could be recovered from Ceylon.")

=== Vijayabā Kollaya (1521) ===
Vijayabahu VI, insulted with after being demanded by the Portugese that he should sell to them the royal stockpile of cinnamon at a fixed low price, went to war with the Portugese in 1518. Three years later Vijayabahu VI went to war with the Portuguese again on the same issue. Losing the war, the king was forced to negotiate for peace after severe losses to his army, further weaking the state. In an effort to enhace his and his supporter's power over the monarchy and the royal court, the Ekanayake of Kotte (head of the civil government), assisted by a noble named Kandure Bandara plotted to kill the three elder sons of Vijayabahu VI to ensure the succession of Vijayabahu's minor forth son, by a second queen, Dewarajasinha.

The three Princes, Bhuvanekabahu, Pararajasinha and Mayadunne escape to other parts of the island to rally support, leading to the beginning of the Vijayabā Kollaya. Vijayabahu VI breaks a truce and attempts to assasinate the three princes as they enter the palace grounds. In retaliation the palace is sacked and Vijayabahu is put to death. The eldest Prince Bhuvanekabahu is acclaimed the new king of Kotte, as Bhuvanekabahu VII, while Pararajasinha and Mayadunne are installed as kings owing allegiance to their elder brother. Mayadunne becomes the King of the Kingdom of Sitawaka which included the Four Korales, Denawaka (or the Five Korales), half of Hewagam korale, Kuruwiti korale, Atulugam korale, Panawal korale, Handapandunu korale, Beligal korale, and Dehigampal korales, while Pararajasinha becomes the King of Raigama which is made up of roughly 660 villages in the Rayigam, Pasdun and Wallalawiti korales less the seaports. Bhuvanekabahu as the Kotte sovereign continued to be acknowledged as overlord by the kings of Raigama and Sitawaka. Weerasuriya or Pilasse Vidiye Bandara, a nephew of Vijayabahu VI and Manamperi, the king's equerry, start a rebeillion in the Hapitigam korale a short time after the accession of the three monarchs. According to Fernao de Queyroz, with the Ekanayake of Vijayabahu VI, Weerasuriya proclaimed himself King of Kotte. However Weerasuriya is executed promptly after a battle with the three brothers, marking the end of organized opposition to the new regime in Kotte.

=== Wars of Kotte Succession (1521–1538) ===
After the Vijayabā Kollaya and the subsequent splitting of the Kingdom of Kotte among the three brothers, began a war of succession over who would be the legitimate Sinhalese monarch. Politically, Pararājasinha occupied an precarious middle ground between his two brothers. While his eldest brother, Bhuvanekabahu VII, held control over key maritime ports and the prestige of the Kotte throne, his younger brother, Māyādunnē was committed to expelling the Portuguese and ultimately unifying the island under Sītāwaka. He would emerge as the dominant figure of this period. Pararājasinha and Māyādunnē initially maintained a supportive relationship, as both viewed Bhuvanekabahu’s increasing dependence on Portuguese military assistance as a betrayal of national interests. The Europeans became the primary military protectors of the Kotte kingdom. Pararājasinha opposed the Portuguese and their expanding influence in coastal regions. Consequently, he allied with Māyādunnē in several early attempts to undermine the Kotte–Portuguese alliance. However, historical evidence suggests he lacked Māyādunnē's aggressive military drive, functioning more as a secondary ally than as an independent strategist against Portuguese strongholds. His reign was thus defined less by military confrontations than by the administrative governance of the southern lowlands.

Bhuvanekabahu, assisted by forces despatched by the Portuguese Viceroy of Goa, repulsed the first invasion of Kotte by Mayadunne. Another attempt at seizing Kotte in 1537 failed when Mayadunne's forces were defeated by troops under the command of the Portuguese captain-major Afonso de Souza who was occupying Colombo; a fleet sent from Calicut to assist was on this occasion defeated by the Portuguese at Vedalai. A truce was negotiated between Sitawaka and Kotte in the aftermath of the conflict, and Mayadunne turned his attention south to the Kingdom of Raigama.

=== Dissolution (1538) ===
In the last few years of his life Pararajasinha seems to have settled at Mapitigama in the Atulugam korale, of Sitawaka Kingdom, abandoning the Raigama government. Pararajasinha died in 1538 without any legitimate heirs and the lands of Raigama were taken over by Mayadunne and incorporated into the Sitawaka Kingdom. Bhuvanekabahu VII did not contest this and in fact legitimised Mayadunne's annexation by presenting him a formal grant of the annaxation of Raigama. Māyādunnē's annexation marked a critical turning point for Sītāwaka and a major strategic victory. The absorption of Pararājasinha’s territory effectively expanded Sītāwaka's resources, manpower and access to the southern coastal districts, while at the same time cutting off Portuguese-backed Kotte from the south. By ending Raigama's independence, the move cemented a two-sided conflict between Kotte and Sītāwaka. Mayadunne invaded Kotte a third time but Bhuvanekabahu VII defeated Mayadunne's invading forces with the help of the Portuguese, eventually paving the way to an uneasy peace. The Portuguese wanted to conduct a full-scale offensive against Sitawaka and neutralize Mayadunne, but Bhuvanekabahu VII did not support their cause; only wanting Portuguese help for defensive purposes.

== Bibliography ==
Web

- "Sovereigns of Sri Lanka: King Pararajasinha of Raigama Kingdom [1521-1538 CE] (රයිගම පරරාජසිංහ රජතුමා)". AmazingLanka.
- Wijayawardena, Kusumsiri (30 November 2018). "Roar සිංහල - මේ කොයි යන්නේ - රයිගම් යන්නේ". Roar Media (in Sinhala).
- "Divisional Secretariat - Bandaragama - Historical Background". bandaragama.ds.gov.lk. Ministry of Home Affairs.

Journals

- De Silva, C. R. (1977). "The rise and fall of the kingdom of Sitawaka (1521-1593)". The Ceylon Journal of Historical and Social Studies. VII (1): 1–43.

Theses

- Somaratna, Gintota Parana Vidanage (1969). Political history of the Kingdom of Kotte (c. A.D. 1400-1521) (PhD thesis). SOAS, University of London.
