= Rajasinha I =

Sri Lankan king of Sitawaka from 1581 to 1592

Rajasinha I පළමුවන රාජසිංහ සීතාවක රාජසිංහ
- Lion of Sitawaka; Chakravarti
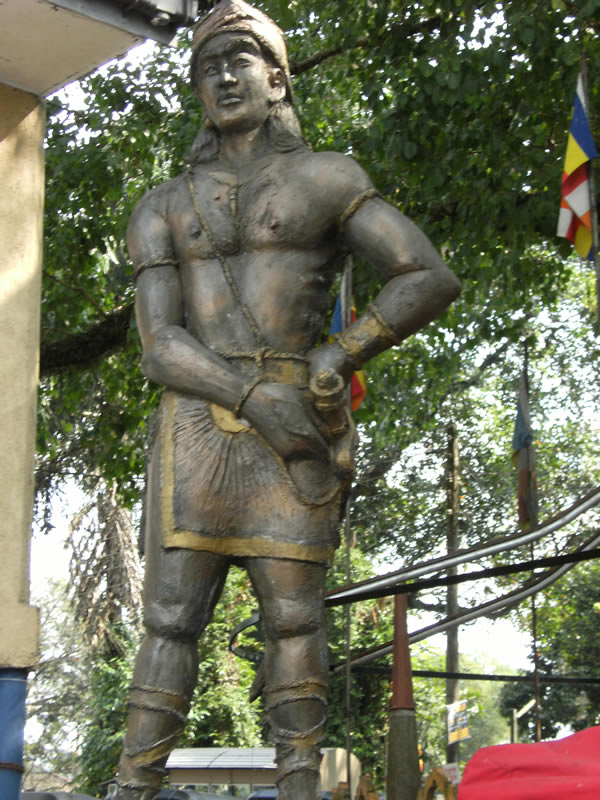
- Statue of Prince Tikiri pre coronation

King of Sitawaka
- Reign: 1581–1592
- Coronation: 1581
- Predecessor: Mayadunne
- Successor: Rajasuriya

King of Kandy
- Reign: 1581–1591
- Predecessor: Kusumasana Devi
- Successor: Vimaladharmasuriya I
- Born: 15 August 1532; Sitawaka
- Died: 17 March 1593 (aged 60); Pethangoda Bamboo Grove
- Burial: Kingdom of Sitawaka
- Spouse: Queen Consort Nilupulmala Kirawelle
- Issue: Prince Rajasuriya; Prince Jayasuriya
- Father: Mayadunne
- Mother: Queen Consort Leelawathi
- Religion: Saiva Siddhanta prev. Theravada Buddhism

Rajasinghe I also known as the lion of Sitawaka (Sinhala:පළමුවන රාජසිංහ, සීතාවක රාජසිංහ) was a king of Sitawaka, known for his patriotism and fight against the Portuguese invasion of Sri Lanka. Born as Tikiri Bandara to King Mayadunne, he received the name "Rajasinha" (meaning the Lion King) after the fierce Battle of Mulleriyawa.

== Ascent to throne ==
Generally, the recorded period of Rajasinha's reign starts from 1581 to 1592. However, as per Portuguese navigator De Queros, Mayadunne had turned the kingdom over to Rajasinha in 1578 before his death in 1581. There are various narratives surrounding Rajasinha's role in his father's death. As per Thibbotuwawe Buddharakhitha's Mahawamsa (Chapter 4) written during the reign of Kirti Sri Rajasinha of Kandy, Rajasinha killed him. Minor Rajawaliya wrote that his patricide was considered an irreversible anantharya karma by Buddhist monks, so conflicts arose between him and the monks. As a result, he followed an anti-Buddhist line. However, others believe that important sources such as the Rajavaliya and “Alakeshwara War“ would have said so if he had killed his father. João Rebairo does not record a patricide either. Dutch envoy Spillburjon, who visited Sengkadagala kingdom, reported that the rumor of patricide was spreading only in the Kingdom of Kandy. Queros was known for his antipathy towards Sitawaka Rajasinha, if so if he had committed patricide, Queros would have reported it without fail. However, in his lengthy account, Queros said that Mayadunne died of natural causes after living 85 years. According to him, Rajasinha returned to Seethawaka from the siege of the Colombo fort on hearing about the death of his father.

== Expeditions ==
While his main battle was against the Portuguese forces in defense of the sovereignty of the Sinhala monarch, he had to battle with numerous internal forces—some regional and individual, supported directly and indirectly by forces from Portugal.

Once, Veediya Bandara was crushing a rebellion, and in his absence, Mayadunne of Sitawaka prepared to attack the Kingdom of Kotte with the ruler of Kingdom of Kandy as his ally. When word reached Veediya Bandara in Uva Province, he made haste to descend upon the army of Kandy before it joined forces with Mayadunne. Afterwards, his army invaded and captured the Kingdom of Sitawaka as Mayadunne fled without a fight.

This however was an ambush; secretly deployed forces above Sitawaka fort attacked Veediya Bandara's men and took them by complete surprise. Unprepared and outnumbered, they endured a heavy defeat for the misjudgment of their leader. Veediya Bandara himself retreated with several of his guards only to be betrayed by them, as Prince Tikiri had announced a hefty price for his head. Meanwhile, Velayudha Arachchi fought alone with Prince Tikiri's army to make enough time to fall back his Commander and friends of commanders.

It is said that 50 traitors of the Kingdom of Kotte fought with Veediya Bandara and his men to win that hefty price and Maggona Arachchi fought to his death to protect Veediya Bandara, when Prince Tikiri Bandara Rajasinha, son of Mayadunne, arrived with a massive force.

Rather than have them face certain death, Veediya Bandara ordered Vijeyakoon Mudali, Hiti Imbule Bodiraja Perumal, and Varusapperuma Arachchi to flee to Kotte and wait for his orders, but they refused. Veediya Bandara was angry and ordered them to fall back and carry the body of the loyal commander-general of his bodyguard, Maggona Arachchi, his childhood friend. He decided to surrender to prince Tikiri who in time, distinguished himself as a warrior king.

As a captive of Prince Tikiri, Veediya Bandara fell in love with the sister of Prince Tikiri and the daughter of King Mayadunne. He managed to escape with the help of the princess and they married.

In another such adventure, Mayadunne initiated a campaign to destroy Veediye Bandara primarily due to (1) the ill-treatment meted out to Mayadunne's daughter Tikiri Kumari, the wife of Veediya Bandara and (2) his failure to support Mayadunne in waging war against the Kandyan ruler. Combined Sitawaka and Portuguese troops attacked Veediye Bandara's fort at Pelenda, chasing him down to Devundara and capturing Tikiri Kumari. Sitwaka troops were led by twelve-year-old Tikiri Bandara. Veediye Bandara re-grouped with the troops of the Kandyan leader and reached Salpiti korale to attack Sitawaka troops. He was defeated by Tikiri Bandara again. He fled to Kanda uda rata and returned to Alut Nuwara with the troops of the Kandyan king. After a fierce battle at Alutnuwara, Veediye Bandara was decisively defeated by Tikiri Bandara. According to the "Alakeshwara War", this battle was fierce and legendary, following which Tikiri Bandara was called "Rajasinha". Rajawaliya states that the title Rajasinha which implies "Lion who is the king of kings" was given to him following this famous battle.

While Rajasinha waged his war against the Portuguese, King Karaliyadde Bandara utilized Portuguese soldiers to protect his Kandyan kingdom. Infuriated by this relationship with Portuguese invaders, with the support of Weerasundera Mudali of Peradeniya, Rajasinha led his troops up to the entry point at Balana in 1583 and chased Karalyadde Bandara.

The battle with the Portuguese in Mulleriyawa was the bloodiest fought to date. While the Portuguese had guns and more advanced weapons, the Sinhalese army, simply equipped with swords and their ancient fighting method called Angam Pora, defeated the entire Portuguese army. According to Queros, though he solicited the support from Malabar coast or Kerala troops, the non-availability of a naval fleet caused by the Portuguese raids of port towns affected his endeavors to cleanse the country from invaders despite his remarkable sieges of Colombo Fort in 1581 and 1587.

== Battle of Mulleriyawa ==
A Portuguese army led by Captain Major Afonso Pereira de Lacerda was defeated by Sitawakan forces at Mulleriyawa in 1562. But Portuguese sources provide a different picture.

Pereira de Lacerda suffered from chronic malaria which almost reduced him to a state of delirium. So Goa sent a veteran commander named Jorge de Menezes (nicknamed Baroche for his exploits at the city of Broach which lies in the bay of Cambaya) to take over. He took over the office in the year 1559 and claimed that he intend to finish the enemy that brought him to the island. De Menezes marched out, triggering the events that eventually led to the battle of Mulleriyawa.

De Menezes held the office of captain-major of Portuguese Ceylon from 1559 to 1560 which places the battle sometime after May 1559 and at the same time questions the above date (1562).

=== Movements to the Battle ===
The Portuguese advanced along the southern bank of the Kelani River through Maedanda and Weragoda towards Mulleriyawa. Their objective was to capture the Mapitigama stockade on the northern bank. It was strategically located, (current day Udumapitigama) controlling the river and land route to Sitawaka. Therefore, by capturing it the Portuguese expected to use it as a launching pad for the coming invasion.

King Mayadunne received the news of this invasion force and sent an army under the command of his son Rajasimha toward Hewagama. On arrival, he summoned the military caste of Aturigiri Korale, Hewagam Korale, Koratota, and Hokandara areas to further bolster his numbers. Surprisingly, previously fierce enemies of Sitawaka, the younger Maggona Arachchi, sons of late General Maggona Arachchi, joined with Sithawaka forces to destroy the armies of Portugal and their Sri Lankan supporters. It is believed that after the fall of the Kingdom of Kotte with the Veediya Bandara's son, Don Juan Dharmapala Maggona fighters were desperate for the country and the nation.

Meanwhile, a Portuguese detachment under Jorge de Menezes and Jorge de Melo successfully surprised the retreating Sitawakan border guards in a sneak attack at dawn. They captured a smaller stockade on the southern bank, killing the garrison of 300 men. Encouraged by this early success, de Menezes prepared his forces to capture the grand stockade of Mapitigama. At this moment, he received reports of Sitawakan forces in a meadow (Hewagama) and ordered a night march.

Tikiri Bandara was aware of the movements of de Menezes and de Melo and sent a force under Wickramasinghe Mudali to check their advance. These armies met at the village of Mulleriyawa one hour before dawn.

=== First battle of Mulleriwaya ===
The battle was short and the Sitawakans were defeated. They retreated towards Hewagama leaving 200 dead, pursued by the Portuguese. Wickramasinghe Mudali was himself wounded. Jorge de Menezes wanted to annihilate the Sitawakans and pressed the pursuit.

Retreating Sitawakan forces took refuge in a narrow pass that had been fortified earlier. Against the better judgment of veteran soldiers, de Menezes ordered to attack on the fortified pass. But now reorganized and well entrenched, Wickramasinghe Mudali managed to repulse repeated waves of attacks.

These futile efforts exhausted the Portuguese and consumed their ammunition reserves. When the captains approached de Menezes regarding low gunpowder reserves, it led to the famous reply “...If there is no powder they might load their muskets with sand, and if they did not shoot, they might finish the fight with the sword, because such brave Portuguese had no need of arms as long as they had nails and teeth.”

De Menezes renewed the attack, but his men withdrew against his orders to hold back. Exhausted and low on ammunition they were forced to rest at the village of Mulleriyawa.

=== Second Battle of Mulleriyawa ===
Once he received the news, Tikiri Bandara divided his forces into three groups. The first group consisted of militiamen from Athurugiriya, Hewagama, Koratota, Hokandara, and 1000 Sitawakan swordsmen with targes. He sent them in a flanking maneuver to cut off the enemy's retreat and to attack in the rear.

Then he reinforced Wickramasinghe Mudali's remaining forces with elephants and elite targe bearers and deployed them in left and right wings. Their exact role is not known but probably their orders were to secure flanks and to stand by as reserves.

Finally, Tikiri Bandara deployed the remaining targe bearers, war elephants, and cavalry in the center and assumed the command himself.

Meanwhile, the Portuguese found their rear blocked by large trees and the enemy close by, so they drew up themselves (arranged in battle ranks) in an open area at Mulleriyawa. (Rajavaliya specific about the fact that Sitawaka forces attacked an enemy army in formations, on the other hand, according to Portuguese sources they were ambushed by a force of war elephants while withdrawing.)

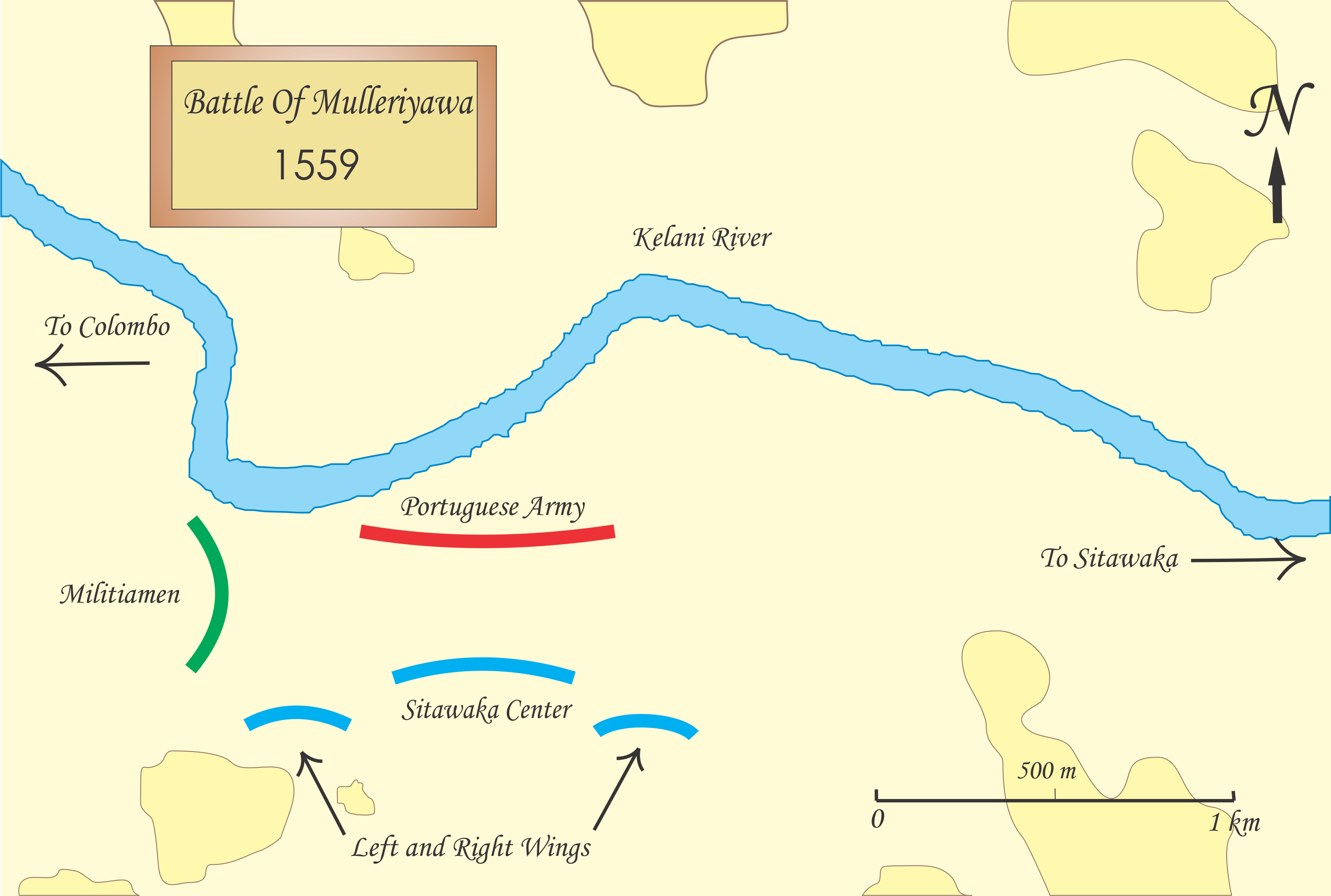
Battle of Mulleriyawa - Troop Disposition

Tikiri Bandara, mounted on a horse, led the center on a full frontal attack. His force was arranged in divisions (Jayasundara division, Vijayasundara division), but the targe bearers, war elephants, and horses charged mingled together to prevent the Portuguese from reloading their muskets. Targe bearers advanced under the cover of the elephants to avoid fire (“clinging to the tails of the elephants” – Rajavaliya). At the same time, the mixed force of militia and targe bearers attacked from the rear and flank and joined the fight.

The flanking maneuver worked and the war elephants broke through the Portuguese ranks. The battle soon became an intense melee; unable to reload, the Portuguese had to use their muskets as clubs. The intensity of the battle described in Portuguese sources by accounts of men trying to stop elephants with banner staffs, and a soldier attacking Chingalaz (Sinhalese) with teeth when he lost his weapons.

Tikiri Bandara rode throughout the battle line, encouraging men to continuously press the attack and to close the gaps. Once the Portuguese managed to retreat through a gap in the line and found that Sitawakan forces hurrying on to the next pass to cut off their retreat again.

The Portuguese had almost given up themselves when something unexpected happened. A soldier named António Dias de Lomba fired a berço cannon (canhão de berço – Breech-loading swivel gun usually used for grape shots) which had been abandoned in the field. The shot fell among a line of Sitawakan soldiers, and killed many. It must have shocked the Sitawaka forces because they stopped attacking. Taking advantage of the lull, the Portuguese managed to retreat through a wood. Although the Sitawakans were no longer pressing the attack, Portuguese sources provide names of six soldiers who were killed in this wood by Sitawaka forces using musket fire alone. Some Portuguese soldiers retreated using boats.

Those who escaped found refuge in the smaller stockade they had captured in the early part of the campaign. However, many were wounded and their pride was shaken.

=== Legacy ===
After the battle, Tikiri Bandara sent for the Arachchies of Koratota, Hewagama, Korale, and Hokanrdara, rewarding them for their vital charge against the Portuguese rear. He also bestowed the new name "Hewagama" (also called Hewakam or Hewapanne) upon a Korale general due to his service during the battle; his previous name has not survived in the historical records.

The Arachchi of Koratota was gifted Bandara's sword, and to this day his descendants (who have changed their surname to Perera according to certain Charlatans posing as Angampora masters) still maintain the weapon in their possession, using it to practise the martial art of angampora. All angampora-practising warriors from Maggona who had previously served under the Kingdom of Kotte were issued pardons by Bandara and were ordered by him to relocate from Maggona to the kingdom's borders to guard its frontiers, including the Homagama region. The Arachchies of Maggona abandoned their previous duty of protecting the Maggona fort due to Dharmapala of Kotte's betrayals and the decision to grant the Kingdom of Kotte to his proteges via a deed. Eventually, many Sinhalese changed their names to Portuguese ones but continued to observe Buddhism and Sinhalese culture.

Names of two war elephants: “Viridudassaya” of Jayasundara division who captured an enemy standard and “Airavana” of Vijayasundara division who captured a shield and a chain appear in chronicles.

== Decline of the Kingdom of Sitawaka ==
King Rajasinghe I appointed a South Indian named Aritta Kivendu as his chief advisor and acted on his advice. He was awarded the title Mannamperuma Mohottala. King Rajasinha arranged the marriage of Mannamperuma Mohottala to a sister of a junior queen known as the "iron daughter" He reverted to Shaiva Siddhanta, the first since Devanampiya Tissa's conversion. He was reported to have settled Brahmans and Tamil Shaivite Velalars at significant Buddhist sites such as Sri Pada, etc. The Velala Gurukkals acted as religious mentors of the King and strengthened Shaiva Siddhantism at these centres. Under the advice of Mannamperuma Mohottala, he razed many Buddhist religious sites to the ground. The discontent this caused among the Buddhist public and prelates was a major reason for the downfall of the kingdom. Annexation of the Kandyan kingdom and the killing of many royals are also believed to have contributed to the decline. His cruel approach to Buddhism ignited anti-government rebellions with the involvement of Buddhist prelates. This gave rise to conflict with the Buddhist prelates. Traces of the era exist in temples like Barandi Kovila (Bhairava-andi kovil) in Sitawaka and the worship of other Shaivite deities by the Sinhalese, like the syncretic Natha deviyo, Sellakataragama and others.

In the Sath korale region, a prince named Pothupala Bandara rebelled against Rajasinha with the support of the Portuguese. The rebellion was suppressed and all leaders who had supported the rebellion were beheaded. According to the Manadarampura Puwatha, prelates were involved in an attempt to make Konappu Bandara the king of Kandy. This conspiracy was exposed leading to the execution of hundreds of Buddhist prelates. Mandaram Pura Puwatha reported that in one place, 121 monks were killed by Rajasinha. One of the notable victims was the chief prelate of Sitawaka. Support of the maha sangha which had been a pillar of strength for Mayadunne and Tikiri Bandara to mobilize public support for the Sitawaka kingdom rapidly eroded.

Konappu Bandara having returned to Kandy via Mannar, Sri Lanka started a rebellion in Kandy. First, he defeated the troops led by the general Aritta Kiwnendu. Secondly, Konappu Bandara defeated troops led by King Rajasinha himself. Rajawaliya reported that he withdrew saying that there was no king in front of him who fought valiantly from 11 years of age. However, this person who wages war in Kandy has many merits and he has now lost his merits.

== Death ==
On his return from the defeat at Balana, he died in March 1592. The reason for his death was a wound caused by a pointed bamboo-segment at Pethangoda while returning to Sitawaka. Rajawaliya further recorded that the death was a result of the black magic (suniyam) imposed on him by the Dodampe Ganithaya though it is now suspected that the cause of his death was tetanus caused by the binding of animal faeces to the open wound. Alakeshwara war reported that he was cremated at Mahanuwara which means the then capital Sitawaka. He was succeeded by his son Rajasuriya in 1593.

== Arms ==
Royal Standard of Rajasinha I.

== In popular culture ==
- Portrayed by Darshan Dharmaraj in the 2019 TV Derana TV series Kusumasana Devi.

== See also ==
- Mahavamsa
- List of monarchs of Sri Lanka
- History of Sri Lanka
- Kingdom of Sitawaka

== Sources ==
- Kings & Rulers of Sri Lanka
- The sitawaka Kingdom
- Mayadunne and Rajasinha

Rajasinha I Born: ? 1544 Died: March 1592
Regnal titles
Preceded by Mayadunne	King of Sitawaka; 1581–1592	Succeeded by Rajasuriya
