= Maggona Arachchi =

Ancient Kalinga-Sinhalese military caste in Sri Lanka

Maggonage Silva/Fonseka
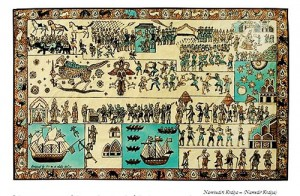
- The Maggona Arachchi Kodiya of the Hewagam Community.

Regions with significant populations
- Sri Lanka,

Languages
- Sinhala, Tamil

Religion
- Buddhism, Roman Catholicism

Related ethnic groups
- Sinhalese, Kalinga (historical region), Khandayat_(caste), Yadava

Maggona Arachchi (Sinhala: මග්ගොන ආරච්චි, romanized: maggona Arachchi also Maggonage, Maggona ge) is a Sinhalese speaking Khandayat ethnic group of Sri Lanka. The House of Kaikesi Irugal migrated from Odisha in the 13th Century, claiming lineage to the Yadava royalty in the Kingdom of Kalinga in Eastern India. They are probably related to Khandayat people.

== History ==
Maggona Arachchis are former Yadava people who lived in ancient Kalinga. They were a warrior caste known as Khandayat. After the Ashoka Empire conquered Kalinga, Yadava's Khandayats embraced Buddhism.

They arrived in the time of the Kingdom of Gampola from Odisha. They came with the Tamil Nadu Madurai - Kanchipuram Alagakkonara Family - අලගක්කෝනාර පවුල to fight the Vijayanagara Empire and Jaffna as mentioned in Alakeshvara Yuddaya.

Once Minister Nissanka Alagakkonara got enough power at Gampola royal court, he influenced the royal court to arrange the southern fort to protect the Kotte Fort at Maggona and appointed Maggona Arachchi as commander. He was responsible to train his force in martial arts (Angampora) and provide soldiers to the Kingdom of Kotte.

The local lords of the house of Malala Irugal came to power in Kalutara Area. Maggona Arachchi were sworn as their protectors as Malala's did to Kaikesi's, as mentioned in Chronicles of Veediya Bandara. Maggona Arachchi General battled alongside Veediya Bandara and was the head of Bandara's personal guards.

=== Fall of General Maggona Arachchi ===
While Veediya Bandara was crushing a rebellion, Mayadunne prepared to attack Kotte with the ruler of Kandy as his ally. When the news reached Veediya Bandara, he descended upon the army of Kandy before it joined forces with Mayadunne. Afterwards, his army invaded and recaptured Sithawaka as Mayadunne fled without a fight.

This, however, was a ruse. Secretly deployed forces attacked Bandara's men and took them by surprise. Unprepared and outnumbered, they endured a defeat for Bandara's misjudgment. Bandara retreated with several of his guards only to be betrayed by them for the price on his head. Velayuda Arachchi was fighting to allow his Master and Friends of Commanders to fall back. It is said that 50 men of the Kotte Army fought Veediya Bandara for the bounty and Maggona Arachchi fought till death to Bandara, when Tikiri Bandara Rajasinha, son of Mayadunne arrived in force.

To avoid certain death, Bandara ordered Vijayakoon Mudaliya, Bodhiraja Perumal of Hiti-Imbula, and Varusapperuma Arachchi to flee to Kotte and await his orders. They refused, angering Bandara. He ordered them again to fall back and carry the body of Arachchi. Instead they surrendered to prince Rajasinha.

The house of Kaikesi Irugal decided to guard the southern fort as they were instructed centuries before and did not participate in any major battle or politics in Kingdom of Kotte during Portuguese rule.

=== Battle of Mulleriyawa ===
At the Battle of Mulleriyawa Kaikesi Irugal House - Maggona Arachchi and his people joined with Prince Tikiri Bandara, later King Rajasinha I of Sitawaka.

Maggona Angam fighters received the king's forgiveness and protection for fighting for the Kingdom of Kotte. They relocated from Maggona to Ja - Ela (to guard the borders). Some decided to stay at Hewagam Korale. Maggona Arachchis left their previous duty of protecting Maggona fort because of the betrayal of Don Juan Dharmapala. He gave the kingdom of Kotte to the proteges. This second betrayal let them to join forces with Tikiri Bandara.

=== Aftermath ===
During the rule of the British they killed many of the Angam caste in Sri Lanka. Many adopted Portuguese surnames. Angam caste changed their names to Perera while the Maggona Arachchi changed their names to Silva and Fonseka. They remained faithful Buddhist and Sinhalese.

== Remaining families ==
A few families remain:

- Maggonage Silva
- Maggonage Fonseka

In modern times caste members entered commerce and politics. Some families are involved in real estate, law, information technology and Sri Lanka's Armed Forces.

They make up a small minority among Sinhalese speakers along with Hewagam and Salagama. They are mostly classified as a law-making, warrior caste rather than an ethnic group. However, most have distinct origin stories compared with the majority Sinhalese ethnic groups.
