= Haltota =

Coordinates: 6°42′N 80°02′E

Haltota is a city located in Western Province, Sri Lanka. It is a legendary city related to the King Raigam Bandara. Postal code of Haltota sub post office is 12538
