= Sitawaka fort =

Fort in Sri Lanka

- Part of Colombo District
- Avissawella, Sri Lanka

Site information
- Type: Defence fort
- Condition: Remnant

Location
- Location within Colombo District
- Coordinates: 6.952983°N 80.224367°E

Site history
- Built by: Kingdom of Sitawaka

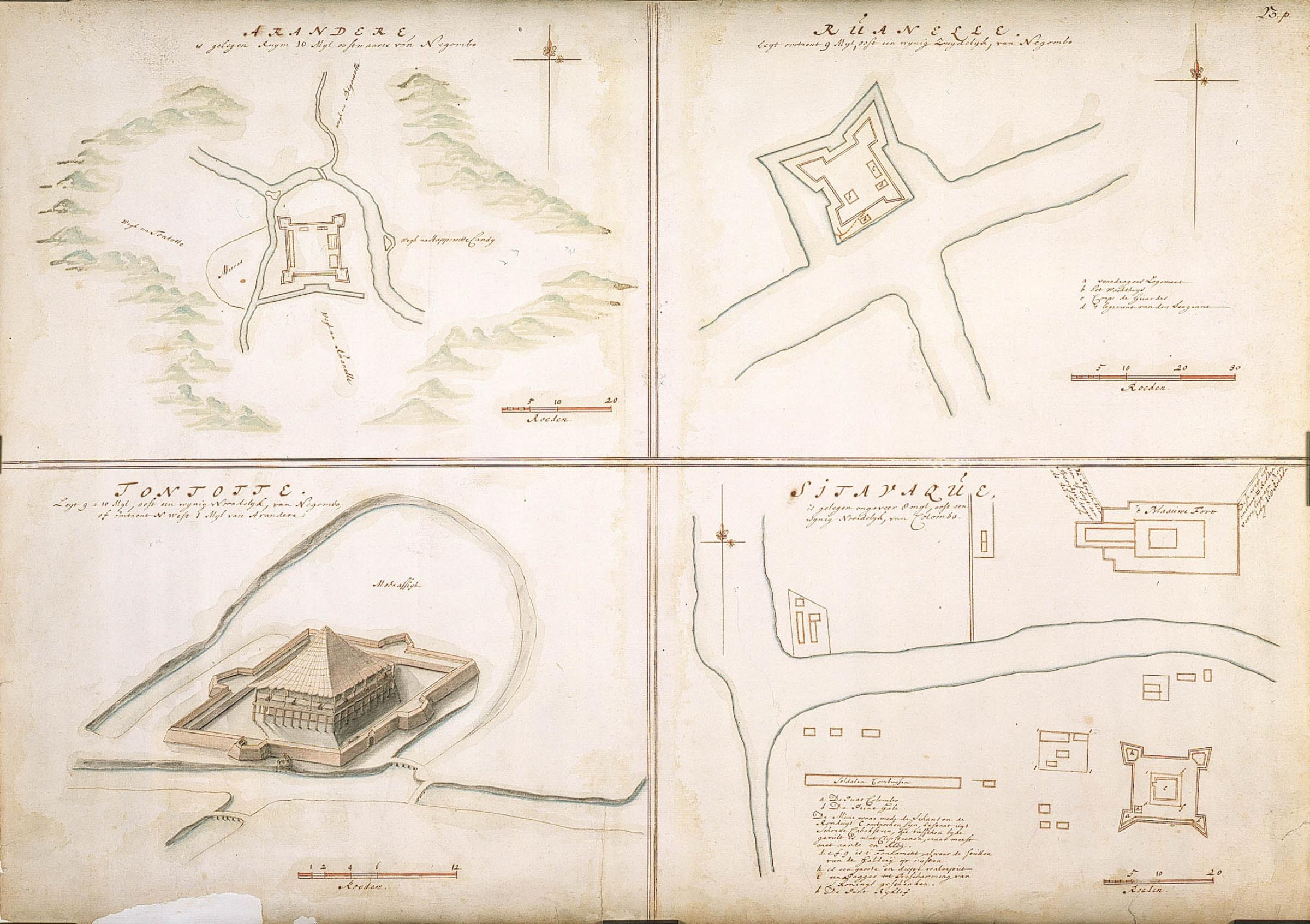
1690 Map of Sitawaka fort (bottom right corner)

Sitawaka fort (Sinhala: සීතාවක බලකොටුව, romanized: Sitawaka Balakotuwa; Tamil: சீதவாக்கைக் கோட்டை, romanized: Cītavākkaik Kōṭṭai), was built by the Sitawaka kingdom in Avissawella, Sri Lanka. It was adjoined with the palace of king Rajasinha I. The fort had been mounted with cannon on the river bank.

Sitawaka fort is destroyed along with palace of king and only the ruins can be seen today by the side of the Avissawella – Panawala road.
