= Vijayabā Kollaya =

1521 assassination of Vijayabahu VI, King of Kotte, by his sons

The Vijayabā Kollaya (Sack of Vijayabahu) took place in the Kingdom of Kotte in 1521. The three sons of the reigning king Vijayabahu VI mutinied against their father, killing him, and divided the Kingdom among themselves. The three sons were products of the king's first marriage and were named Bhuvanekabahu (later Bhuvanekabahu VII of Kotte), Pararajasingha (later Raigam Bandara) and Mayadunne (later Mayadunne of Sitawaka). Queen Kirawelle, whom the king married second, had a son named Deva Rajasinghe by her previous marriage. The princes overheard that the king intended to make Devaraja the heir to the throne, at the request of his second queen, and became hostile to the king, and hired a foreigner to murder the king in the palace.

== Background ==
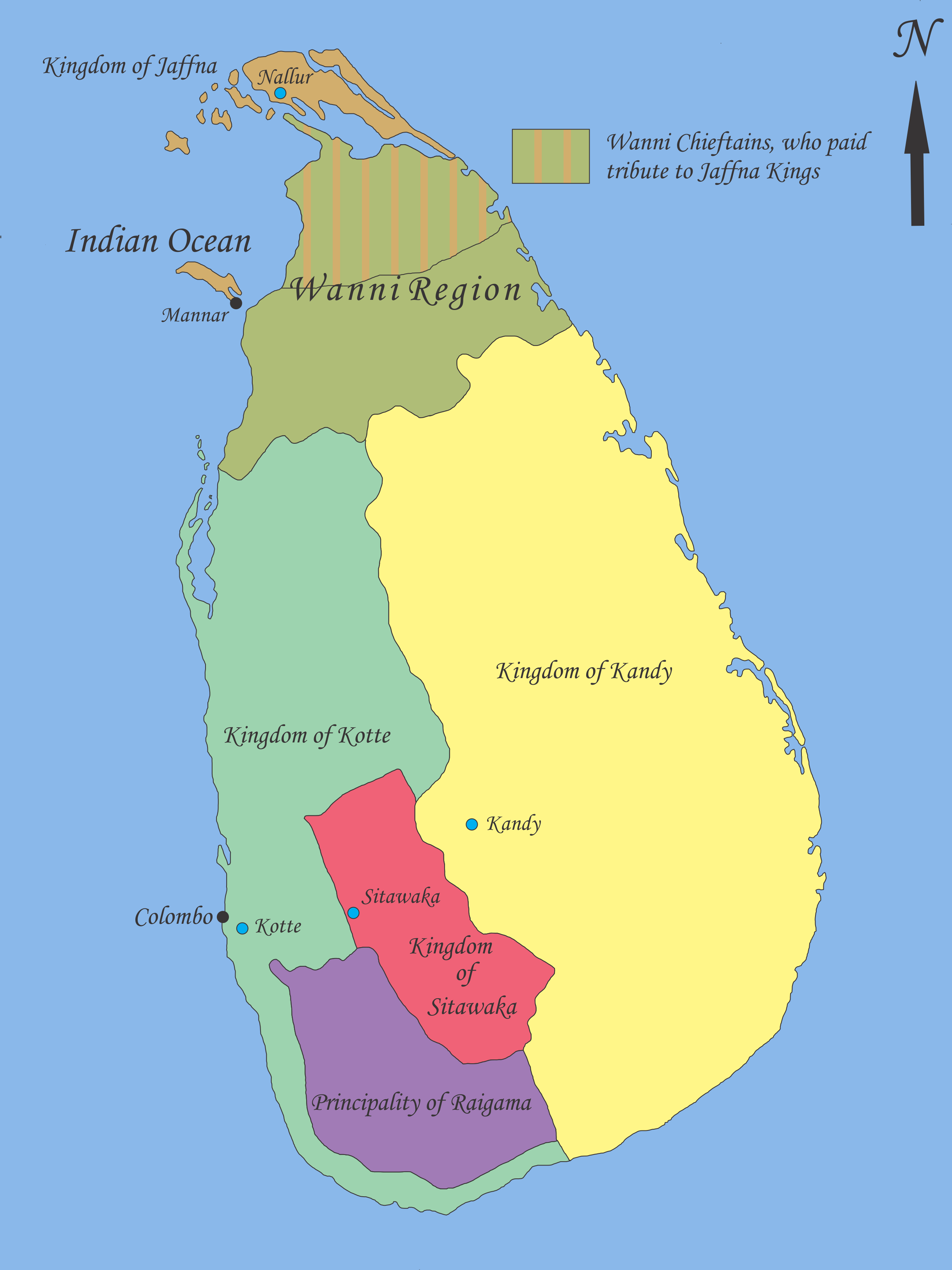
Sri Lanka geopolitics - after "Spoiling of Vijayabahu"

Before his elevation to the throne, prince Vijayabahu lived with his brother Chakrayudabahu, (Note: According to Rajavaliya his name was Sri Rajasinghe)and his wife Kirawelle Mahabiso Bandara, as an associate husband. During their stay at Menikkadawara, the princess gave birth to four princes, Maha Rayigam Bandara who died at a young age, Bhuvanekabahu, Para Rajasinghe, and Mayadunne Raja. Soon after, Chakrayudabahu and his wife died, leaving the three surviving princes in Vijayabahu’s care.

Once Vijayabahu was crowned as King Vijayabahu VI, he married another princess of Kirawelle. She brought with her a boy named Deva Rajasinghe whom Vijayabahu VI adopted. Later, the king plotted with two of his courtiers, Kandure Bandara and Ekanayake Mudali to make Deva Rajasinghe his heir. The three princes discovered the plot and with the assistance of the priests, fled from the capital, Sri Jayawardenapura Kotte, and remained hidden in Borales Migomuwa (Boralesgamuwa in Salpiti Korale). While the two elder princes remained under the care of the Patabenda of Yapa Patuna, prince Mayadunne journeyed to the Kingdom of Kandy where King Jayavira ruled and his queen was Mayadunne’s cousin. With her help, Mayadunne secured the support of King Jayavira who provided Mayadunne the army of Four Korale.

Marching down, Mayadunne ravaged Pitigal Korale and camped closed to Kelaniya in the vicinity of Sri Jarawardenapura Kotte. He was joined by his two brothers and together made preparations for war. Meanwhile, part of King Vijayabahu VII’s army was in favor of the princes and declared “we will not fight against the royal princes”. As a result, the King was forced to sue for peace and the princes insisted that, the two ministers who were involved with the plot were to be handed over for punishment. Kandure Bandara was flogged to death by their orders but Ekanayake Mudali managed to seek sanctuary with the priests.

== Spoiling of Vijayabahu ==
The three princes entered the capital with their army. Unknown to them, King Vijayabahu VI had a detachment of sixty chosen soldiers lying in concealment at Rahas Kunda Watta (Note: According to Rajavaliya, at Kudawatta.) in order to bar the palace gates and to assassinate the princes. The unsuspecting princes entered the palace leaving their army outside. On their way, they met young prince Deva Rajasinghe who was seven years old. When Mayadunne asked him about the current situation in the city, the boy innocently revealed the presence of soldiers lying in wait to ambush them. Realizing the danger, the three princes quickly dashed out through the Karandupathi Gate and escaped to rejoin their army. The army was informed of the king’s treachery and resolved to kill him. A game of Nirogi (Note: It is believed to be a martial sport. According to Parangi Hatane, Sinahalese troops performed a game of Nirogi at Randenivala after the defeat of the Portuguese army.) was organized and the crowds gathered to see it were persuaded to join their cause. Meanwhile, the princes succeeded in winning over the king’s army, and together with the angry mob, both forces stormed the palace.

They plundered the palace, treasury, and the harem. They burst open the treasure chests and gems, gold, silver, silk, and pearls were looted. Vijayabahu's valuables and royal wardrobe were tossed from hand to hand. However, strict orders were conveyed by beating drums, that none of the citizens were to be harmed so as to prevent looting in the streets. Meanwhile Vijayabahu VI was allowed to escape to the upper storey. He locked himself in a room with two of his concubines.

During the night it was decided to assassinate the king. Since none of the Sinhalese dared to shed royal blood, (Note: Referring to this claim, historian Paul E Peiris state “..Even to touch the King was an act of profanity. There is still current a story about Rajasinghe II, who in order to test his courtiers, pretended to be in danger of being drowned while bathing in a river. One of the attendants rushed into the water and dragged him on land. He was rewarded for his zeal but was severely punished for is temerity in laying hands on the King instead of waiting for the King to lay hands on him….) a foreign assassin named Salman (Note: Salma, according to Rajavaliya.)was hired to carry out the deed. He killed Vijayabahu VI inside his chamber.

== Rebellion of Hapitigama ==
The following morning, the council of ministers assembled and selected prince Bhuvanekabahu, the eldest prince, to succeed to the throne. However, the succession was contested by King Vijayabahu VI’s sister’s son, Pilesse Widiye Bandara, also known as Vira Suriya. With the support of Mannamperiya, the Aswela Arachchila (the late king’s equerry) he left Sri Jayawardenapura Kotte with a considerable number of followers. Through Aluthkuruwa they arrived at Ambana and Pasonnuwara and raised the standard of rebellion in Hapitigama Korale.

Prince Mayadunne then arrived with an army and swiftly suppressed the uprising, killing both ringleaders. The inhabitants of Hapitigama Korale were harshly punished, and several high-caste nobles were handed over to Pannayo—a member of one of the lowest castes—whose duty was to cut grass for the elephants.

== Kingdom divided ==
After pacifying the rebellion, a formal coronation took place and Bhuvanekabahu came to the throne as King Buvanekabahu VII. As advised by the Chief Minister Illangakoon, the kingdom was divided into three parts. Youngest prince, Mayadunne, received Sitawaka, Denawaka and Four Korales as Kingdom of Sitawaka while Prince Rayigam Bandara received Raigama, Walallawiti and Pasyodun Korale (excluding the sea ports) as the Principality of Raigama. These were granted as fiefs by Royal sannas and they were given the titles as kings while Bhuvanekabahu VII ruled the rest of the territory as emperor.

== See also ==
- Mayadunne
- Kingdom of Kotte
- Kingdom of Sitawaka

== Bibliography ==
1. B. Gunasekara, The Rajavaliya. AES reprint. New Delhi: Asian Educational Services, 1995. ISBN 81-206-1029-6
2. Paul E. Peiris, Ceylon the Portuguese Era: being a history of the island for the period, 1505–1658, Volume 1. Tisara Publishers Ltd.: Sri Lanka, 1992.OCLC 12552979
3. S.G. Perera, A history of Ceylon for schools – The Portuguese and Dutch period. The Associated Newspapers of Ceylon Ltd.: Sri Lanka, 1942.OCLC 10531673
