= Pararajasinha =

King of Raigama

Raigam Bandara රයිගම් බණ්ඩාර
- Painting of Raigam Bandara

King of Raigama
- Reign: 1521 – 1538
- Coronation: 1521
- Predecessor: No (Kingdom was established in 1521 by Vijayabā Kollaya)
- Successor: Kingdom annexed in 1538 by Mayadunne of Sitawaka Kingdom
- Born: Kotte, Kingdom of Kotte
- Died: 1538; Mapitigama, Kingdom of Sitawaka
- Spouse: Princess Aalawathi
- Issue: Princess Chandrawathi; Princess Suwanawathi
- House: House of Siri Sanga Bo
- Father: Vijayabahu VI
- Mother: Anula Kahatuda (Kirawalle Maha Biso Bandara)
- Religion: Theravada Buddhism

Pararajasinghe (Sinhala: පරරාජසිංහ), or more commonly known as Raigam Bandara (Sinhala: රයිගම් බණ්ඩාර) was the ruler and the founder of the Kingdom of Raigama (r. 1521) in modern-day Sri Lanka. He was the son of Vijayabahu VI (1521) and brother of Mayadunne and Buvanekabahu VI. When Kingdom of Kotte was divided due to the incident known as "Vijayabā Kollaya", which resulted in the assassination of king Vijayabahu, Pararajasinghe became the ruler of the Kingdom of Raigama.

== Reign ==
=== Accession (1521) ===
Map of Sri Lanka in 1521

Raigam Bandara became the monarch of the newly created Kingdom of Raigama as Pararajasinha in 1521 following the political upheaval known as the Vijayabā Kollaya. The event resulted in the assassination of his father, Vijayabahu VI of Kotte, and the subsequent division of the Kingdom of Kotte among his three sons.

Following the division, the eldest brother, Bhuvanekabahu VII, inherited the throne of Kotte, while the youngest, Mayadunne, established his authority over the Kingdom of Sitawaka. Pararajasinha received the territory of Raigama, comprising approximately 660 villages within the Rayigam, Pasdun and Wallalawiti korales, excluding the principal seaports. Although the three territories were governed separately, Bhuvanekabahu VII retained his position as the senior monarch, with his brothers acknowledging his overlordship.

Pararajasinha ruled Raigama from 1521 until his death in 1538. He was known as a good ruler who upheld the economy of the Raigama. However, during a period characterised by political rivalry among the three successor states of Kotte. His territory occupied an intermediate position between the domains of Bhuvanekabahu VII and Mayadunne, whose competing political ambitions contributed to a series of military confrontations during the early sixteenth century.

During his reign, Pararajasinha maintained close political relations with Mayadunne, particularly in opposition to the increasing involvement of the Portuguese Empire in the affairs of Kotte. Bhuvanekabahu VII had sought Portuguese military assistance to defend his kingdom against his brothers, while Mayadunne attempted to challenge the political authority of Kotte. Pararajasinha supported Mayadunne in the resulting conflicts.

The conflict intensified during the 1530s as Mayadunne sought military assistance from the Zamorin of Calicut against the Portuguese and their allies in Kotte. Pararajasinha joined Mayadunne in opposing Bhuvanekabahu VII, and the two brothers participated in campaigns against their elder brother's authority. In October 1536, forces allied with Mayadunne again threatened Kotte, although the anticipated arrival of Portuguese reinforcements compelled them to withdraw.

=== Death and annexation (1538) ===
Towards the end of his reign, Pararajasinha resided at Mapitigama, within the territory associated with Sitawaka. According to the Rajavaliya, he was brought to Sitawaka and made to reside at Mapitigama, where he subsequently died. Historical accounts differ concerning the circumstances under which Mayadunne acquired control of Raigama, with some indicating that the territory may have passed into his possession before Pararajasinha's death.

Pararajasinha died in 1538, bringing his seventeen-year reign to an end. Following his death, Mayadunne took possession of the Kingdom of Raigama and incorporated its territories into the Kingdom of Sitawaka. The annexation increased Mayadunne's territorial authority and strengthened his position in the continuing struggle against Bhuvanekabahu VII.

The incorporation of Raigama into Sitawaka marked the dissolution of the kingdom as a separate political entity. The territories formerly governed by Pararajasinha subsequently formed part of Mayadunne's expanding kingdom, leaving Kotte and Sitawaka as the principal competing Sinhalese powers in the southwestern region of the island.

== Arms ==
Royal Standard of Pararajasinha. (Note: The flag colours are based on colours commonly used in Sinhalese flags and banners during the 14th–16th centuries.)
