= Bhuvanaikabahu VII =

Buvanekabahu VII හත්වන බුවනෙකබාහු

King of Kotte
- Reign: 1521–1550
- Coronation: 1521
- Predecessor: Vijayabahu VII
- Successor: Dharmapala
- Born: 1468
- Died: 29 December 1550 (aged 81–82); Kingdom of Kotte
- Spouse: Gampola Princesses (Subadra or Samudra)
- Issue: Samudra Devi
- House: House of Siri Sanga Bo
- Father: Vijayabahu VII
- Mother: Anula Kahatuda
- Religion: Theravada Buddhism

Bhuvanaikabahu VII (Sinhala: හත්වන බුවනෙකබාහු), (1468 – 29 December 1550) was King of Kotte in the sixteenth century, who ruled from 1521 to 1550. He was the eldest son of Vijayabahu VI of Kotte, whom he succeeded, and his chief queen Anula Kahatuda. He was born in 1468 and his brothers were Mayadunne of Sitawaka and Rayigam Bandara. After his father married a second time, his new queen brought a son from another relationship called Deva Rajasinghe, who the king intended to pass on the crown to, and Bhuvanaikabahu and his two brothers responded by fleeing the kingdom, and on their return they had an army given by the King of Kandy.

Bhuvanaikabahu VII was succeeded by his grandson Dharmapala.

== Reign ==
After Mayadunne successfully led the men of Jayavira, the king of Kandy, against his father, the Kingdom of Kotte was divided into three among Vijaya Bahu VII's legitimate sons in 1521: Bhuvanaikabahu was crowned the King of Kotte as Bhuvanaikabahu VII, Sitawaka was given to Mayadunne and Rayigam was given to Rayigam Bandara, who was also known as Parajasinghe or Maha Raigam Bandara. However, after their brother, Rayigam Bandara, died in 1538, Mayadunne seized his kingdom and became an enemy of his elder brother, who had already been suspicious of him due to the large role he played in the assassination of their father.

During Bhuvanaikabahu's reign, Mayadunne, along with his son Rajasinghe I, fought continuously against the Portuguese in order to drive them out, and they also attempted to get rid of Bhuvanaikabahu to get the Kingdom of Kotte. This resulted in the King siding with the Portuguese, and he required their protection against his younger brother During his reign he was a weak king, being overly dependent on the Portuguese and eventually allied with them.

=== Meeting with Francis Xavier ===
However, King Bhuvanaikabahu VII also went against the Portuguese, in terms of religion. In the mid 1500s, the Jesuit missionary Francis Xavier was sent by King John III of Portugal to India and Ceylon to preach Catholicism. He met with the king of Kotte, and discussed with him the conversion of his religion. Fernão de Queiroz describes the conversation between them: "I understand father that your religion is the only true one. All others have so much errors and is clear to anyone. I know fully well that continuing the path that I follow I can end only in hell. It is true that my father and my ancestors died pagans. But I see that the religion of Buddum contains errors as intolerable as they are incompatible with reason.

I have come to understand that the penitence of the Christians is the true remedy for sins. Though I know the truth Christ, on account of the place which I hold, I am unable to receive Baptism at once, for the least suspicion that they should have of me in this regard would be enough to ruin the whole of my realm. I beg you to patronize cause in front of the Governor of India, that he may come to my assistance more readily and give me 100 soldiers to protect my person, lest my adversaries prevail against me as well as against the prospects of the total conversion of my lieges".

Antonio Barreto assisted Xavier in trying to convert Bhuvanaikabahu, The Portuguese finally gave up on their endeavour, and the monarchy in Portugal were notified.

== Assassination ==
After the Portuguese halted their attempts in converting Bhuvanaikabahu, plans were made to assassinate him on the orders of Viceroy Afonso de Noronha. As the king passed one of his windows in his place, the gunman fired his musket. Bhuvanaikabahu fell, the bullet having passed through his head. The king was attended to and various medicines were used to treat him, but he died after three hours on December the 29th 1550 (some sources suggest 1551).

Other books state that Bhuvanaikabahu was murdered on the orders of his brother Mayadunne, who reigned in Sitawaka.

== Family ==
Bhuvanaikabahu had no male heirs to the throne. By his queen he had a daughter, Samudra Devi. The king had organised for her to be married to Prince Jayo Bandara, however she was in love with a prince called Vidiya Bandara of Irugal-Malala clan, who murdered Jayo Bandara and married Samudra Devi. Their son, Dharmapala, succeeded Bhuvanaikabahu as king of Kotte. Dharmapala was also a baptized Catholic, taking the Portuguese name João (English: John), and thus was very cooperative towards the Portuguese.

== See also ==
- List of Sinhalese monarchs
- House of Siri Sanga Bo

Bhuvanaikabahu VII House of Siri Sanga Bo Born: 1468 Died: 1550
Regnal titles
Preceded by Vijayabahu VII	King of Kotte; 1521–1550	Succeeded by Dharmapala
