= Parakramabahu VIII =

Vira Parakramabahu VIII
- King of Kotte
- Reign: 1484–1518
- Predecessor: Parakramabahu VII
- Successor: Dharma Parakramabahu IX
- Spouse: Two Keerawalle Princesses (sisters)
- Issue: King Dharma Parakramabahu IX King Vijayabahu VII King Sri Rajasinghe King Sakalakala Wallabha King Thaniya Wallabha
Names
- Ambulagala Kumara
- House: House of Siri Sanga Bo
- Father: King Parakramabahu VI- adoptive father Lord Panikal Prathiraja - father
- Mother: Queen Consort Swarnamanikya Keerawalle - adoptive mother Princess Swarnawathi Kirawelle - mother
- Religion: Theravāda Buddhism

Vira Parakramabahu VIII, also known as Ambulagala Kumara, was King of Kotte in the fifteenth century, who ruled from 1484 to 1518. He succeeded Parakramabahu VII and was succeeded by his son Dharma Parakramabahu IX. Another son Vijayabahu VII also became king.

An adopted son of Parakramabahu VI, he overthrew Panditha Parakramabahu VII, the son of Sirisangabo Bhuvanaikabahu VI (another adopted son of Parakramabahu VI) and claimed the throne of Kotte.

The Portuguese led-by Lourenço de Almeida arrived at Sri Lanka in 1505 during his reign, and diplomatic ties with the Portuguese Empire were initiated. The Portuguese who met the King made an agreement that they would protect the coastal region of the country, and in return the King should pay a tribute of 80 tons of cinnamon to them.

During the end of Parakramabahu VIII's lifetime, he divided his kingdom among his sons, and made the eldest son Dharma Parakramabahu as the next heir to the throne.

== See also ==
- List of Sri Lankan monarchs
- History of Sri Lanka

Parakramabahu VIII House of Kotte Born: ? ? Died: ? ?
Regnal titles
Preceded by Parakramabahu VII	King of Kotte; 1484–1518	Succeeded by Dharma Parakramabahu IX
