= Parakramabahu IX =

Dharma Parakramabahu IX
- King of Kotte
- Reign: 1489–1513
- Predecessor: Parakramabahu VIII
- Successor: Vijayabahu VI
- House: House of Siri Sanga Bo
- Father: Parakramabahu VIII
- Religion: Theravada Buddhism

Dharma Parakramabahu IX was King of Kotte in the sixteenth century, who ruled from 1489 to 1513. He succeeded his father Parakramabahu VIII as king of Kotte and was succeeded by his brother Vijayabahu VI.

== See also ==
- List of Sri Lankan monarchs
- History of Sri Lanka

Parakramabahu IX House of Kotte Born: ? ? Died: ? ?
Regnal titles
| Preceded by Parakramabahu VIII | King of Kotte; 1489–1528 | Succeeded by Vijayabahu VII |
