= Siri Perakumba Pirivena =

Buddhist temple in Sri Lanka

- සිරි පැරකුම්බා පිරිවෙණ
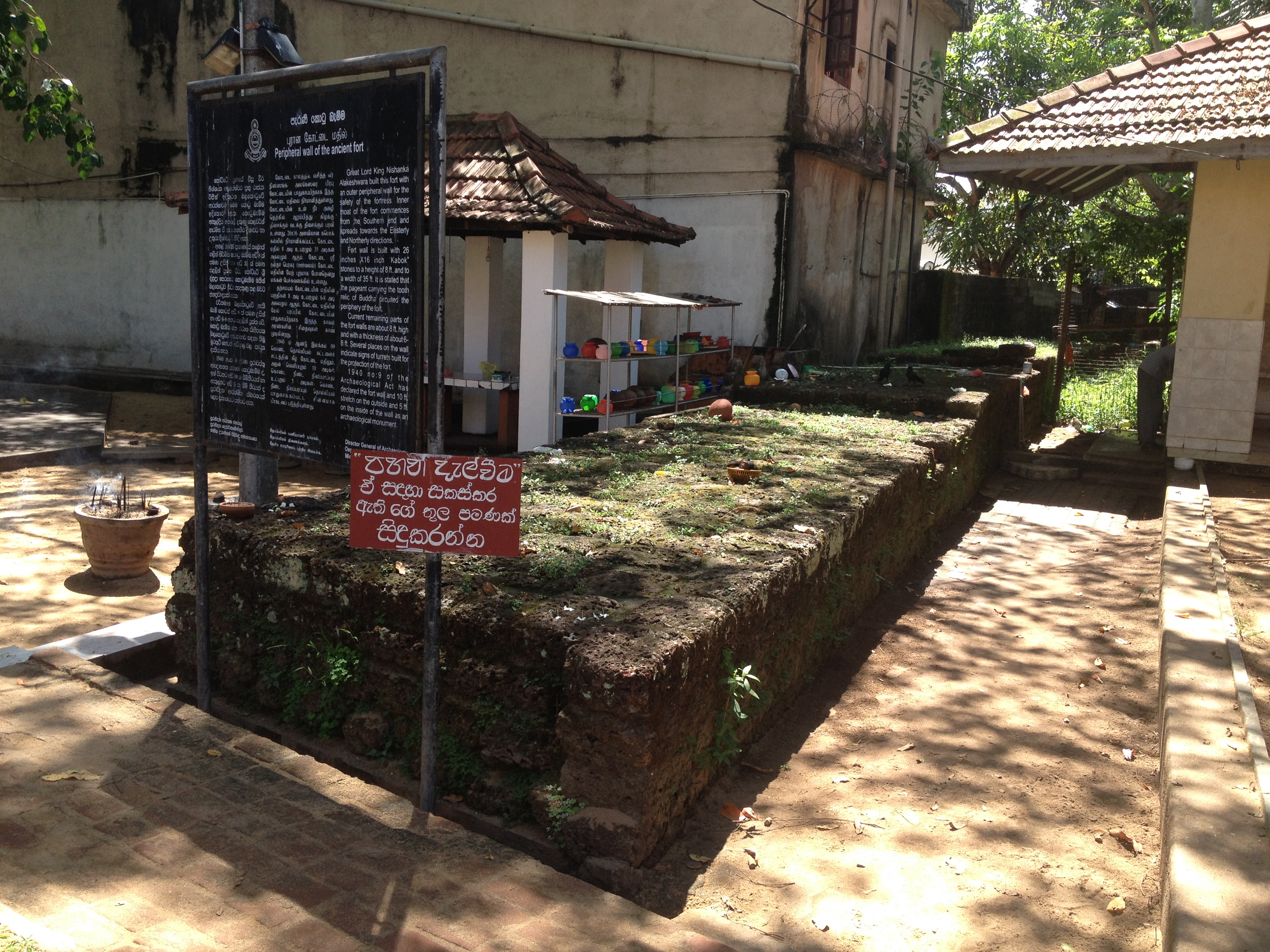
- The parts of Peripheral wall of the ancient fort of Kotte at the Vihara premises

Religion
- Affiliation: Buddhism
- District: Colombo
- Province: Western Province

Location
- Location: Sri Jayawardenepura Kotte, Sri Lanka
- Interactive map of Siri Perakumba Pirivena
- Coordinates: 06°54′09.9″N 79°54′22.6″E

Architecture
- Type: Buddhist Temple

Siri Perakumba Pirivena (Sinhala: සිරි පැරකුම්බා පිරිවෙණ) is a historic Buddhist temple situated in Sri Jayawardenepura Kotte, Western province, Sri Lanka. It is located at the entrance to Ethul Kotte on the Sri Jayawardenepura Mawatha road (B240). The temple has been formally recognised by the Government as an archaeological site in Sri Lanka. The designation was declared on 14 May 1971 under the government Gazette number 14958.

== History ==
The historic Siri Parakumba Pirivena is said to have been constructed at the Gabada Wattha of King Parakramabahu VI. The Pirivena was begun in 1875 as a monastic educational institute by Hingulawala Jinrathana Anu Nayaka Thero of the Kotte Chapter.

=== Archaeological ruins ===
The traces of old moat and rampart wall of ancient fortress of Kingdom of Kotte are visible presently in the boundaries of the Siri Perakumba Pirivena. According to the resources, the fortress at Kotte was built by the minister Nissanka Alagakkonara for protection from foreign invasions. Current remaining parts of the fort walls in the temple premises are about 8 feet high and with a thickness of about 6–8 feet.

A well dating back to the Kotte period has also been preserved at the Pirivena and known as Ura Keta Linda type well. The inner wall of the well is covered with clay rings and has a decorative ring at the top. Parts similar to this type of well had also been found during an extension work of a building at the Kotte Telecommunications Center premises and they are now displayed at the Kotte Archeological Museum.
