= Vijayabahu VI =

King of Kotte from 1513 to 1521

Vijayabahu VI හයවන විජයබාහු
- Devinuvara slab inscription of Vijayabahu VI

King of Kotte
- Reign: 1509–1521
- Predecessor: Parakramabahu VIII of Kotte
- Successor: Bhuvanekabahu VII (as king of Kotte) Mayadunne (as king of Sitawaka) Raigam Bandara (as king of Raigama)
- Born: c. 1445
- Died: 1521 (aged 75–76)
- Wives: Queen Consort Anula Kahatuda Kirawelle (Kirawalle Maha Biso Bandara); Queen Consort Rupawathi alias Kiravelle Devarajasinghe Devi
- Issue: King Bhuvanekabahu VII King Mayadunne King Raigam Bandara Prince Maha Raigam Bandara Prince Devaraja
- House: House of Siri Sanga Bo
- Father: Parakramabahu VIII
- Mother: Kirawalle Princess
- Religion: Theravada Buddhism

Vijayabahu VI (Sinhala: හයවන විජයබාහු), was the son of Parakramabahu VIII (who was also known as Ambulagala Kumaraya), who was an adopted child of Parakramabahu VI who founded the Kingdom of Kotte in 1412. He was born in c. 1445 and grew up with his brothers Sri Rajasinghe, Dharma Parakramabahu IX, and Raigam Bandara. He also had a sister who was married to Manamperi Arachchi.

== Reign ==
After the death of the elder brother, Dharma Parakramabahu IX, the people of Kotte wanted his half brother, Sakalakala Valla, to become king. At the time he was reigning as a Viceroy at Udugampola. However, according to the Rajavaliya, a narrative of Sinhalese Kings, Vijaya Bahu was crowned as Vijaya Bahu VI by his half brother Sakalakala Valla. He came to the throne in 1513 A.D.

== Family ==
Vijaya Bahu had two wives. The first was Anula Kahatuda, who Vijaya Bahu had cohabited with, along with his brother Sri Rajasinghe who died at Menikkadawara. Anula produced three sons to Vijaya Bahu: Bhuvaneka Bahu, Mayadunne and Maha Raigam Bandara. He also took a queen from Kiravella who had a son called Deva Rajasinghe. This queen successfully persuaded her husband to make her son the King after his death, and Vijaya Bahu planned to murder his three sons.

== Vijayaba Kollaya ==
The three sons, Bhuvaneka Bahu, Mayadunne and Maha Raigam Bandara had found out their fathers' plans to kill them and install Deva Rajasinghe on the throne of Kotte. They fled the kingdom and sought safety, whilst their father plotted with Ekanayake Mudaliyar and Kandure Bandara. Jaya Vira II, who was married to Mayadunne's cousin, was reigning as the King of Kandy. He provided the three brothers with an army to fight against their father. They planned an attack on Kotte, and Vijaya Bahu struggled to assemble an army, as no one was willing to cause harm to the royal princes. Consequently, he sent messengers to his three sons to ask for peace. They responded by asking for Ekanayaka Mudaliyar and Kandure Bandara to be sent to them, as they had participated in planning their deaths.

Ekanayaka Mudaliyar was able to escape, however Kandure Bandara was brutally murdered. Following this, the young prince Deva Rajasinghe was confronted by Mayadunne, and informed him that his father had a secret army waiting for them at Kudawatta. An encounter between the army of Vijaya Bahu and Mayadunne's men was avoided, and Mayadunne led his men straight for the palace in Kotte. Everything of value belonging to the king was robbed, while he hid with his wives in the highest point of the palace. Then it was decided that the king should die, however no Sinhalese accepted this task. The murder of the king was carried out by a Muslim man, named Salman.

Following the death of the Vijaya Bahu VI, the kingdom was divided between the three brothers and a new form of government commenced. Bhuvaneka Bahu VII took the kingdom of Kotte, Mayadunne took Sitawaka and Raigam Bandara had Raigama.

== See also ==
- List of Sri Lankan monarchs
- History of Sri Lanka

Vijayabahu VI House of Kotte Born: 1445 -1521
Regnal titles
| Preceded by Dharma Parakramabahu IX | King of Kotte; 1513–1521 | Succeeded by Bhuvanekabahu VII |
