= Mulleriyawa =

Mulleriyawa මුල්ලේරියාව
- Suburb
- Mulleriyawa

முல்லேரியவா transcription(s)
- Location within Colombo District Location within Sri Lanka
- Coordinates: 6°56′00″N 79°56′00″E
- Sri Lanka: Western Province
- District: Colombo
- Divisional Secretariat: Kolonnawa
- Time zone: UTC+05:30 (SLST)

Mulleriyawa (මුල්ලේරියාව) is a suburb located within the greater metropolitan area of Colombo, Sri Lanka. Situated approximately 7 kilometers east of Colombo’s city center, Mulleriyawa occupies a strategic position along the Avissawella-Colombo road, providing convenient access to the heart of the capital and other surrounding areas.

== See also ==
- Battle of Mulleriyawa
- List of towns in Western Province, Sri Lanka
- Kotikawatta
