= Mayadunne =

Mayadunne මායාදුන්නේ

King of Sitawaka
- Reign: 1521–1581
- Coronation: 1521
- Predecessor: Vijayabahu VII of Kotte
- Successor: Rajasimha I
- Born: 1501; Kotte, Kingdom of Kotte
- Died: 1581 (aged 79–80); Avissawella, Kingdom of Sitawaka
- Burial: Kingdom of Sitawaka
- Spouse: Leelawathi Devi; Sumana Devi
- Issue: Crown Prince Maha Rajjuru Bandara Prince Thibiripola Rajjuru Bandara Prince Santana Bandara Princess Suriya Devi Princess Tikiri Devi (Queen Maha Biso Bandara of Sitawaka) Prince Tikiri Bandara (Rajasimha I)
- House: House of Siri Sanga Bo
- Father: Vijayabahu VII of Kotte
- Mother: Queen Consort Anula Kahathuda Kirawelle (Kirawalle Maha Biso Bandara)
- Religion: Theravada Buddhism

Mayadunne (Sinhala: මායාදුන්නේ) was the founder and ruler of Sitawaka from 1521 to 1581. A fierce opponent of the Portuguese, he devoted his life to oust his father and brother Bhuvanekabahu VII, the king of Kotte in order to preserve the independence of the island, being undermined by Portuguese intrigue. He constantly invaded the territory of Bhuvanekabahu of Kotte.

== Early life ==
Mayadunne was born in 1501 in Kotte of the Kingdom of Kotte. He was the son of Vijayabahu VII who reigned as king from 1509 to 1521. Mayadunne was the youngest child born to Vijaya Bahu VII and his main Queen. He had two full brothers, Bhuvanekabahu and Raigama Bandara. Bhuvanekabahu who was also king of Kotte from 1521 to 1551.

=== Wijayaba Kollaya ===
In 1521 together with his two full brothers Bhuvanekabahu and Raigama Bandara, who were born to the main queen of Vijaya Bahu VII, he revolted against his father, suspecting him of planning to pass the throne of Kotte to one of Vijaya Bahu VII's other queen's sons (Devaraja) after his death. Although Mayadunne was the youngest of the three brothers he was the mastermind behind this revolt which ended with the death of their father Vijaya Bahu VII (he was assassinated by a hired foreigner) and the Kotte Kingdom was divided between the three brothers. This incident is known as "Wijayaba Kollaya" and can roughly be translated as the "Spoiling of Vijayabahu". Bhuvanekabahu came to power as Bhuvanekabahu VII of Sri Lanka and he got established in the Kotte Kingdom with a region roughly including present day Colombo, Gampaha, Districts, North Western Province and Southern Province coastline. Raigama Bandara got established in Raigama with his control roughly over present day Kalutara District & Southern Province except the coastline (which was under Kotte Kingdom). Mayadunne got established in the Kingdom of Sitawaka (Present day Avissawella) controlling roughly the modern day Sabaragamuwa Province (Kegalle, Ratnapura Districts).

== Reign ==
Since Mayadunne was the main actor during the rebellion against their father, Bhuvanekabahu VII was from the beginning suspicious of him and developed close ties with the Portuguese who had established a fort in Colombo (1517). Before long Mayadunne got popular support from the local chiefs and population who didn't like Bhuvanekabahu VII collaborating with Portuguese. Mayadunne led several invasions against Kotte but Bhuvanekabahu VII was able to drive Sitawakan forces back with the help of Portuguese. During the first phase of these battles Mayadunne was helped by an anti-Portuguese Kingdom in Calicut, India. The Portuguese wanted to kill Mayadunne fearing one day he would become a greater threat to their foothold on the Island but Bhuvanekabahu VII didn't let them to conduct an all out invasion against Sitawaka.

Several years later after Raigam Bandara died, in 1538, Mayadunne annexed the Kingdom of Raigama to Sitawaka. The all out rivalry between Sitawaka and Kotte started to unroll here on. By this time the Buddhist monks in Kotte who were responsible of the Dantha Dhathuwa, the Sacred Tooth Relic of Buddha, secretly smuggled it into Sitawaka and placed it under the protection of Mayadunne since they saw Portuguese as hostile towards Buddhism. According to the local tradition if someone has the ownership of the Tooth Relic he can claim the throne of all the Kingdoms within Sri Lanka. Mayadunne's popularity grew rapidly among locals and similarly Bhuvanekabahu VII of Kotte and later Dharmapala of Kotte had to rely more and more on Portuguese for help. Mayadunne started frequent attacks against the Kotte Kingdom and more and more of the lands of Kotte became part of Sitawaka. Since Kotte lacked local support the Portuguese automatically became the protectors of that Kingdom. Hence the rivalry between Kotte and Sitawaka turned into a rivalry between Sitawaka and Portuguese.

During the period of Kingdom of Sitawaka King Mayadunne had stopped at the Nawagamuwa Pattini Devalaya to make a vow before he went to war with the Portuguese in the Colombo Fort. According to the reports of the Portuguese, in 1550, the King of Portuguese sent 600 troops to help King Bhuvanaikabahu VII of Kotte. They fought with King Mayadunne at Nawagamuwa. It is also recorded that in 1576, the Portuguese army destroyed Nawagamuwa Devale and established an army camp there.

=== Sinhalese–Portuguese War ===
Mayadunne and the Kingdom of Sitawaka was a part of the Sinhalese–Portuguese War, which was an effort to get rid of the occupying Portuguese forces and stop them from colonizing the island. At the time, it was the worst ever defeat by a colonial power on eastern soil. Mayadunne and his son Rajasigha fought the Portuguese in the Battle of Mulleriyawa and won, where the Kingdom of Sitawaka emerged all-powerful, able to challenge the Portuguese, who lost the opportunity to ensure their total control of the island.

== Death and legacy ==
Due to the fact that he stood against Portuguese invaders and stopping them from conquering the whole island, Mayadunne is considered one of the greatest kings of Sri Lanka. He died aged 80, in 1581.

== See also ==
- Mahavamsa
- List of monarchs of Sri Lanka
- History of Sri Lanka
- Nawagamuwa Pattini Devalaya

Mayadunne Born: ? 1501 Died: ? 1581
Royal titles
Preceded by Dharmapala	King of Sitawaka; 1521–1581	Succeeded by Rajasimha I
