= Dharmapala of Kotte =

King of Kotte (r. 1551–1597)

Dharmapala ධර්මපාල දොන් ජුවන් ධර්මපාල

King of Kotte
- Reign: 1551 – 27 May 1597
- Predecessor: Bhuvanekabahu VII
- Successor: Rajasinha I of Sitawaka
- Born: 1541; Royal Palace, Kotte
- Died: 27 May 1597 (aged 55/56); Portuguese Fort, Colombo
- Burial: St. Francis Shrine, Colombo 01. (now - President's House)
- Consort: Dona Isabella; Dona Margarida; Dona Catherina
- Issue: Princess Alingosse queen consort of King Bayinnaung
Names
- Dom João Dharmapala Peria Bandara
- House: House of Siri Sanga Bo
- Dynasty: Kingdom of Kotte
- Father: Lord Veediya Bandara
- Mother: Crown Princess Samudra Devi
- Religion: Roman Catholicism prev. Theravada Buddhism
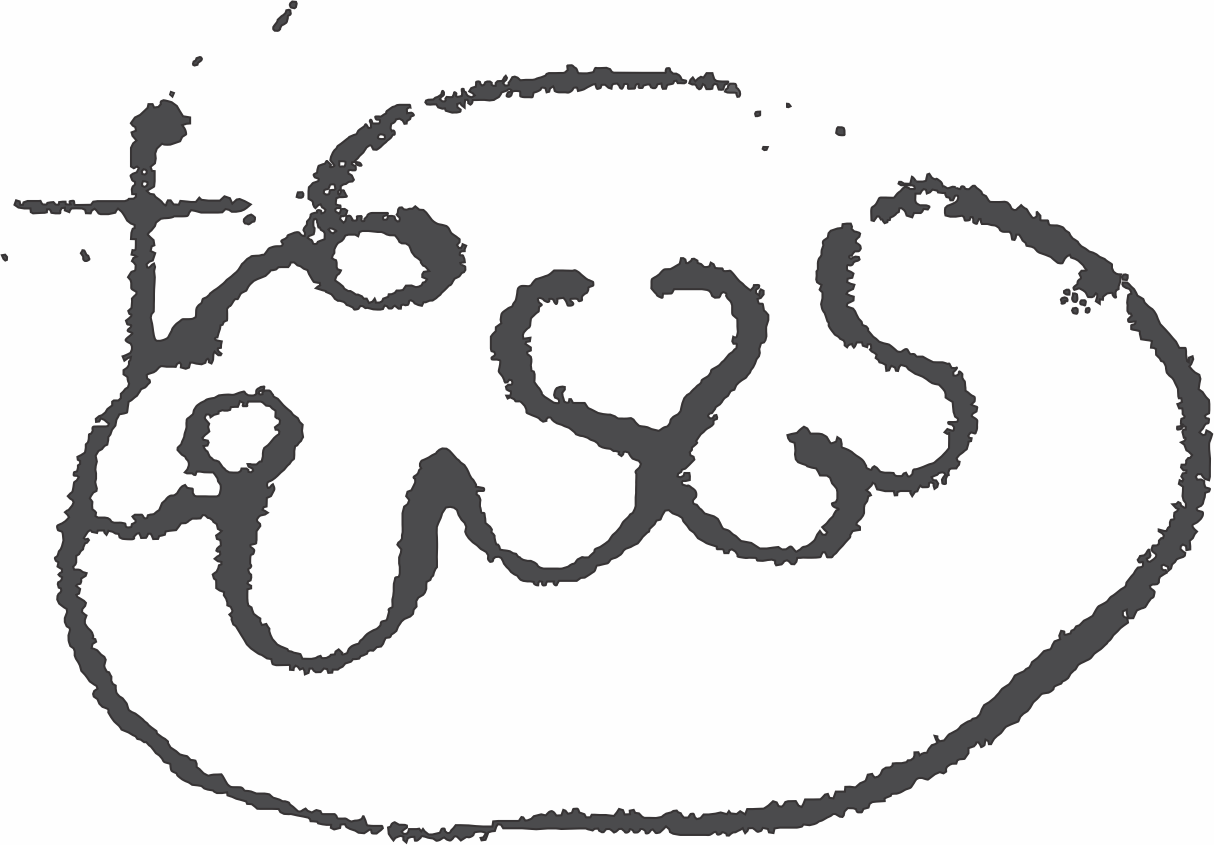
- Signature

Dharmapala (Sinhala: ධර්මපාල) or Dom João Dharmapala Peria Bandara (Sinhala: දොන් ජුවන් ධර්මපාල), (1541 – 27 May 1597) was the last king of the Kingdom of Kotte, in present-day Sri Lanka, from 1551 until 27 May 1597. He is also known as Dom João Dharmapala, the first Christian king in Sri Lankan history. He is widely despised by the majority of Buddhist Sinhalese for having betrayed his religion of birth i.e., Buddhism and converting to the religion of the foreign conquerors, who they viewed as carrying a reign of terror. Dharmapala allowed Buddhist Temples in his Kingdom, including the highly venerated Temple of Kelaniya to be ransacked and burnt down by the Portuguese.

== Birth ==
Dom João Dharmapala (Don John Dharmapala) was born as the eldest child of Weediye Bandara, a Prince from Madampe and his wife Samudra Devi, daughter of King Bhuvanekabãhu VII the King of Kotte. His exact date of birth is unknown, but the year is commonly regarded as 1541. He had a younger brother, Prince Wijayapala. A golden statue of Dharmapala was sent to Portugal by King Buvanekabahu VII to be crowned by the King of Portugal, and thus symbolizing the support of the Portuguese to the prince.

== Personal life ==
His maternal grandfather, King Bhuvanekabahu VII, raised him under the supervision of the Portuguese.

First, he married Princess Isabella of Kandy, daughter of King Jayaweera Wickramabahu of Kandy. After she died, he married Queen Dona Isabella's niece, Princess Margarida of Kandy, who was the eldest daughter of King Karaliyadde Bandara of Kandy.

After his grandfather's assassination by a Portuguese soldier in Kelaniya in 1551, he used to reside in the Colombo fortress under the protection of the Portuguese as his conversion to Christianity was widely opposed by the largely Buddhist Sinhala population of Kotte. The Portuguese military occupation of Kotte during the reign of Don Juan Dharmapala ended in 1565 when they were forced to withdraw from Kotte by the unrelenting attacks of the Sinhalese King Sitawaka Rajasinghe.

After his conversion from Buddhism to Catholicism in 1557 he would bequeath (in 1580) his entire realm to the King of Portugal. The Portuguese takeover of Kotte, however, was resisted by the Sinhalese Buddhists and would only be completed during the captaincy of Dom Jerónimo de Azevedo (1594 - 1612).

== See also ==
- List of Sri Lankan monarchs

Dharmapala of Kotte Born: ? ? Died: 27 May 1597
Regnal titles
Preceded by Bhuvanekabahu VII	King of Kotte –	Succeeded by Mayadunne
