= Kingdom of Kotte =

Sinhalese kingdom in southwestern Sri Lanka from 1412 to 1597

Kingdom of Kotte කෝට්ටේ රාජධානිය
- 1412–1597
- Flag of Kotte

- The Kotte Kingdom at its greatest extent Kingdom of Kotte after the death of Parakramabahu VIII of Kotte in 1518 The Kingdom of Kotte (under Dharmapala of Kotte) in 1587
- Capital: Kotte
- Official languages: Sinhalese, Tamil
- Religion: Theravada Buddhism
- Government: Monarchy
- King
  - 1412–1467: Parakramabahu VI
  - 1472–1480: Bhuvanaikabahu VI
  - 1484–1518: Parakramabahu VIII
  - 1551–1597: Dharmapala
- Historical era: Transitional period
  - Capital moved from Gampola: 1412
  - Disestablishment: 27 May 1597
Preceded by
Kingdom of Gampola
Succeeded by
Kingdom of Kandy
Kingdom of Raigama
Kingdom of Sitawaka
Portuguese Ceylon

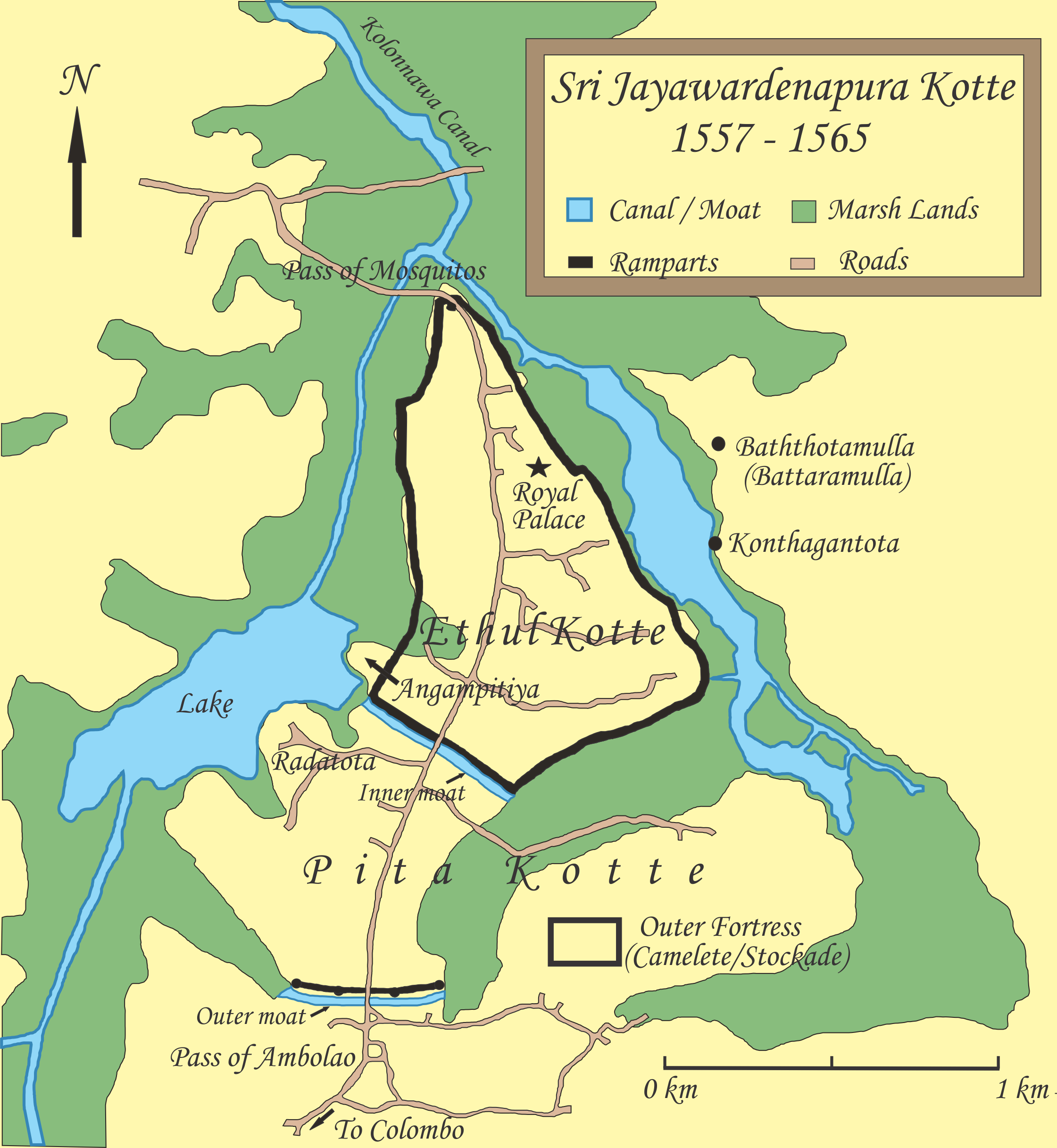
Map of Sri Jayawardenepura Kotte (1557–1565)

The Kingdom of Kotte (Sinhala: කෝට්ටේ රාජධානිය, romanized: Kōṭṭē Rajadhaniya, Tamil: கோட்டை அரசு), named after its capital, Kotte, was a Sinhalese kingdom that flourished in Sri Lanka during the 15th century.

Founded by Parakramabahu VI with the help of the Ming, (Note: Ming-Kotte War#Aftermath) the Kingdom managed to conquer the Jaffna kingdom and the Vanni principalities, and bring the country under one flag. It led to a punitive invasion against the Vijayanagara Empire and captured a port.

The Kotte Kingdom was largely dissolved during the Sinhalese-Portuguese War, as it faced attacks from rival Sinhalese kingdoms, the Kingdom of Sitawaka and Kingdom of Kandy. Dom João Dharmapala handed it over to the Portuguese, thus leading to the formation of Portuguese Ceylon. Kanakasooriya Cinkaiariyan and his two son's also returned from Madurai with mercenaries and managed to conquer Jaffna. The remainder was annexed into Sitawaka and Kandy.

== Etymology ==
The term Kotte is said to have derived from the Sinhalese word kōṭṭa (කෝට්ට) meaning “fortress,” which itself is thought to have originated from the Tamil word kōṭṭai. The word Kotte was introduced by Nissankamalla Alagakkonara, who was the founder of the fortress. They were believed to be from the city of Vanchi, identified with Kanchipuram of Tamil Nadu. The Alagakkonara family have also been identified to be of Tamil ancestry of Vallanattu Chettiar.

== History ==
Kotte was originally founded as a fortress by Minister Alakesvara (1370–1385) of the Alagakkonara clan in the Kingdom of Gampola during the reign of Vikramabahu III of Gampola. It was built to counter invasions from South India along the western coast.

In 1412, Parakramabahu VI established Kotte as his capital city. The site was naturally well protected by the extensive swamp that surrounded it.

Parakramabahu VI first became the king of Gampola in 1412, and in 1415, he established Kotte as his capital. He expanded and fortified the existing citadel and built a new royal palace. Parakramabahu VI waited until ties between the Vijayanagara Empire and Jaffna Kingdom were severed. First, he captured the Vanni and made its leaders loyal to him. Prince Sapumal was the commander of the Kotte army at the time. However, Kanakasooriya Cinkaiariyan and his two sons soon returned from Madurai with mercenaries and regained control of the Jaffna Kingdom, bringing it out of Kotte’s overlordship and reestablishing its independence. During this period, Tamil was used as one of the court languages of the Kotte Kingdom.

=== Rise ===
In 1450, through his conquest of the Jaffna Kingdom in northern Sri Lanka, Parakramabahu VI succeeded in unifying the entire island under his rule. At its height, the Kingdom oversaw one of the greatest eras of Sinhalese literature. Notable poets at the time were Buddhist monks such as Thotagamuwe Sri Rahula thero, Weedagama Maithree thero, and Karagala Wanarathana thero. By 1477, a decade after the death of Parakramabahu VI, regional kingdoms had grown in strength. Most notably a new Kingdom was founded in the central hill country of the island by Senasammata Vikramabahu who successfully led a rebellion against the Kotte Kingdom in 1469.

=== Rule from Kelaniya ===
Parakramabahu IX moved the capital to Kelaniya in 1509 and it stayed there until 1528.

=== Arrival of the Portuguese ===
The Portuguese arrived in Sri Lanka in 1505, landing in Galle Harbour. Once they learnt that they had arrived in Sri Lanka, they sailed to Colombo. From there, they were escorted to the capital, Kotte, by a deliberately winding and lengthy route, designed to create the illusion that the city was far inland and thus difficult to invade from the coast. However, this ruse was undermined when the Portuguese sailors who had remained with the ship repeatedly fired its cannons, and the sound carried to the Portuguese party en route to Kotte, revealing how close the capital truly was.

This incident gave rise to the well-known local saying “parangiya Kotte giya vage” (පරන්ගියා කෝට්ටේ ගියා වගේ) — meaning “like the Portuguese went to Kotte” — which is used to describe doing something in a roundabout way instead of directly. Despite the episode, the Portuguese successfully secured a trade agreement with the King of Kotte during this first meeting.

=== Demise ===
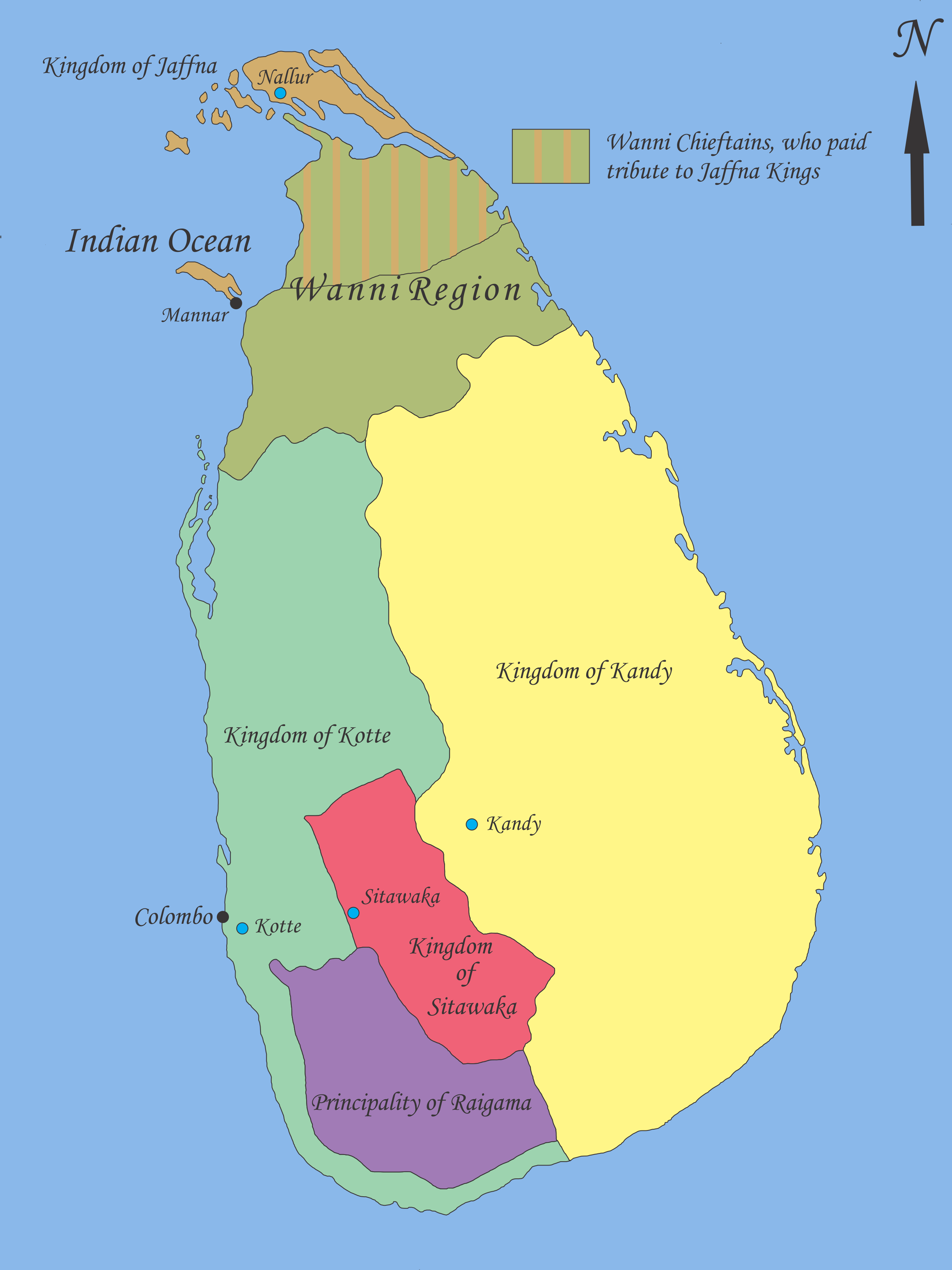
Political map of Sri Lanka following the "Spoiling of Vijayabahu"

The downfall of the Kotte Kingdom began in 1521 with the event known as the Vijayaba Kollaya. The three sons of King Vijayabahu VII mutinied and killed their father, dividing the kingdom among themselves. This led to the creation of three smaller realms: Kotte, Sitawaka, and the Kingdom of Raigama. Among these, the Kingdom of Sitawaka grew increasingly powerful, gaining strong local support, while the Kotte Kingdom became reliant on Portuguese assistance.

Following the Vijayaba Kollaya, King Buvenekabahu VII of Kotte sought Portuguese help to defeat his brother, Mayadunne. He also permitted his daughter’s son, Prince Dharmapala, to be baptized as a Catholic by the Portuguese. After naming Dharmapala as his heir, Buvenekabahu VII was reportedly shot—allegedly by accident—by a Portuguese soldier.

In 1565, the capital of Kotte was abandoned by King Dharmapala due to repeated attacks from the Kingdom of Sitawaka, led by Mayadunne and his son Rajasinghe I. Dharmapala was taken to Colombo under Portuguese protection. Most of the areas of Kotte Kingdom were annexed to the Kingdom of Sitawaka. but after the downfall of Sitawaka in 1594, these areas were re-annexed to the Kotte kingdom. In 1597, Dharmapala formally ceded the Kotte Kingdom to the Portuguese crown, marking the official end of the Kotte era.

== Military ==
The military of the Kotte kingdom was closely associated with both its rise and demise. Poems written in this era give vivid accounts of the contemporary military. Before the arrival of the Portuguese, firearms had not been widely adopted but it is believed that firearms had been introduced to Sinhalese by Arab traders due to the similarity of the design of Sinhala firearms to Arab guns and by Portuguese accounts in 1519 noting their unfamiliarity with local weaponry. However, the use of heavy armour and firearms by Europeans would also result in locals rapidly adopting firearms.

The military consisted of four main departments, namely

- Æth – elephant regiments
- Aśwa – horse regiments
- Riya – chariot regiments
- Pābala – infantry regiments.

=== Notable commanders of Kotte army ===
In the final periods of the kingdom, the Portuguese were often in charge of the military.

- Alagakkonara
- Parakramabahu VI of Kotte
- Manikka Taleivar
- Bhuvanekabahu VI, known also as Sapumal Kumaraya or Chempaka Perumal.
- Veediya Bandara
- Prince of Ambulugala
- Samarakone Rala

=== Significant military victories of Kingdom of Kotte ===
- Capture of Jaffna in 1450
- Capture of Vanni, making its chieftains tribute-paying subordinates
- Successfully subsidising a rebellion in central hills started by Jothiya Situ.
- Invading a port of the Vijayanagar Empire as retaliation to looting a ship belonging to Kotte by the rayan of Adhiramapattanam. Rajavaliya states that the king caused several villages and a town in the Soli country to be pillaged and made tributaries, called Makudam-kotta. The Alakeshwara Yuddaya does not mention an annual tribute but refers to a levy from seven villages called Makulan-kotta, indicating a one-time levy as compensation.⁣
- There's another south Indian connection mentioned in the Tenkasi inscription of Arikesari Parakrama Pandya of Tinnevelly records, "Arikesari Parakrama Pandya who saw the backs of kings at Singai, Anura,"dated between A.D. 1449–50 and 1453–54. Anurai is said to be the capital of the Sinhalese. It's pointing to Pandyan Victory. This is considered unreliable by Rasanayagam as no such battle is mentioned in any local chronicles; he regards it as an empty boast. G. P. V. Somaratna also considers it unreliable, noting that the identification of Anurai with Anuradhapura is unlikely, as the city had not been the capital of the Sinhalese for five centuries. But K.K Pillay disagreed with them and considers it reliable and said this invasion is possible and he says "events which are not favourable or creditable to their own country are not infrequently omitted. Further, it is probable that this invasion of ArikésarParakrama Pandya was that mentioned by Philatales in his History of Ceylon as having taken place in A.D. 1451. The Pandyan king was able and warlike, and there is no reason to doubt this successful invasion of Ceylon." However, he recognises singai means Jaffna kingdom's capital but no historians have considered anurai was a battle against kotte kingdom
- During Parakramabahu VI's reign, Puttalam was invaded by the Karavas from Tamil Nadu. At that period, Puttalam was inhabited by Mukkuvar who had migrated centuries earlier from the Malabar coast. They had established a local polity in Puttalam. Parakramabahu VI invited Karava mercenaries from Kanchipuram, Kaveripattinam and Kilakarai of Tamil Nadu to fight the Mukkuvars. Mukkara Hatana records the Karava leader Mānikka Thalaivan besieging the fortress at Puttalam before moving to Nagapattinum to destroy the Mukkuvar fortress there as well. Mānikka Thalaivan was killed in the final battle but achieved victory. In return, the King of Kotte rewarded them with lands and heraldry.

== Trade ==
The kingdom was situated near Colombo, a very important port at the time. Moorish merchants from India and Arabia dominated the trade of the kingdom until the arrival of the Portuguese. The kingdom’s exports were largely driven by the spice trade—cinnamon, cardamom, and black pepper—while gemstones were also significant. Following the conquest of Jaffna, Kotte gained control of the pearl trade, bringing enormous wealth to the kingdom. Portuguese who arrived there as traders were able to secure a trading deal with the kingdom on their first visit.

== Literature ==
The king’s patronage supported the development of literature and art on the island.

=== Great poet monks of Kotte era ===
- Ven. Thotagamuwe Sri Rahula thero
- Ven. Waththawe thero
- Ven. Weedagama Maithree thero

=== Notable art works of the era ===
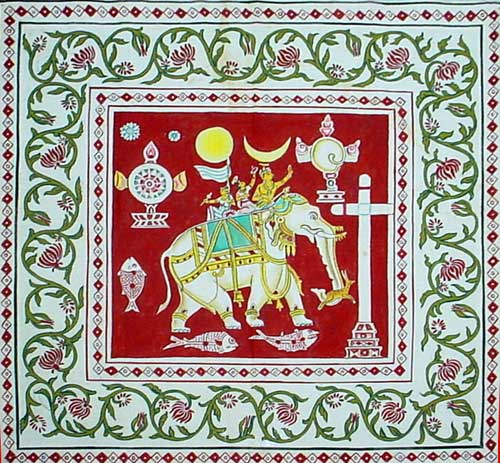
A flag of the Catholic Karava Sinhalese who became Catholics during Kotte era

==== Sandesha poems ====
- Kokila Sandesha
- Paravi Sandesha
- Gira Sandesha
- Salalihini Sandesha
- Hansa Sandesha
- Nilakobo Sandesha

==== Poems and other anthology ====
- Lowada Sangarawa
- Buduguna Alankaraya
- Gutthila Kavya
- Kavyashekaraya
- Parakumba Siritha
- Saddharmarathnakaraya

=== Buddhist education institutions started in the era ===
These institutions paved way not only to the enhancement of Buddhist literature but also to the development of Ayurvedic medicine.

- Padmawthi Piriwena, Karagala
- Vijayaba Piriwena,Thotagamuwa
- Sunethradevi Piriwena, Papiliyana
- Siri Perakumba Pirivena, Ethul Kotte

=== Ayurvedic medical books written in Kotte era ===
- Waidya Chinthamani
- Yoga Rathnakaraya

== Religion ==
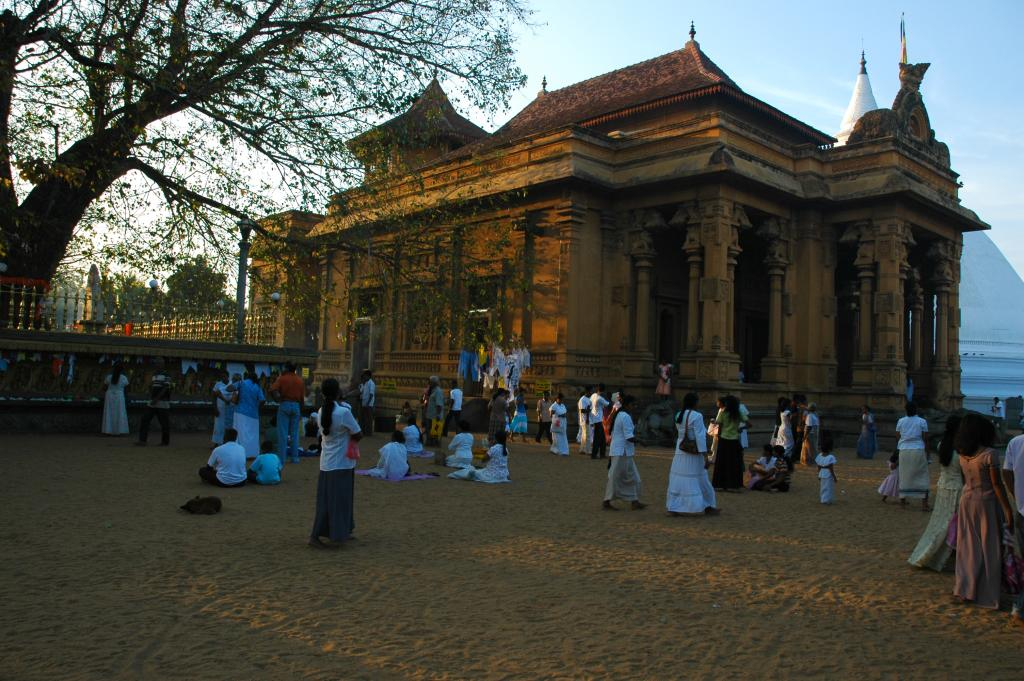
Kelani Viharaya

Buddhism was the state religion for most of the kingdom’s existence. Parakramabahu VI built a shrine for the Sacred Tooth Relic near the royal palace. He also established the Kotte Raja Maha Viharaya to host the Esala Perahera pageant in honor of the Sacred Tooth Relic. Additionally, he also repaired Kelaniya Raja Maha Vihara which along with the Sri Perakumba Pirivena and Sunethra Devi Pirivena became the most famous monasteries in the country.

Hinduism was also given a prominent place in society. Many Buddhist temples included shrines dedicated to Hindu deities such as Vishnu, Murugan (God Kataragama), goddess Paththini, and Gambara, the provincial god. Prince Sapumal (later crowned Bhuvanekabahu VI) built a shrine near the ancient Bo tree of the Kotte Raja Maha Viharaya as a vow to defeat Arya Chakravarthi. He is also credited with building or renovating the Nallur Kandaswamy temple in Jaffna.

The Portuguese converted much of the population to Roman Catholicism. The last king of Kotte, Don Juan Dharmapala, was one of only two Catholic Sinhalese monarchs in Sri Lankan history (the other was Kusumasena Devi), although several other contemporary kings had also adopted Catholicism temporarily.

== Baththotamulla ==
Battaramulla was a village that provided rice to the king's palace. The royal flower gardens were also located in this village in an area called Rajamalwatta.

== See also ==
- Kastane
- Lascarins
- Saddharmarathnakaraya
- Siege of Kotte (1557–1558)
- List of Sri Lankan monarchs
- History of Sri Lanka
