= List of Kandyan monarchs =

King of Kandy
- මහ රජතුමා
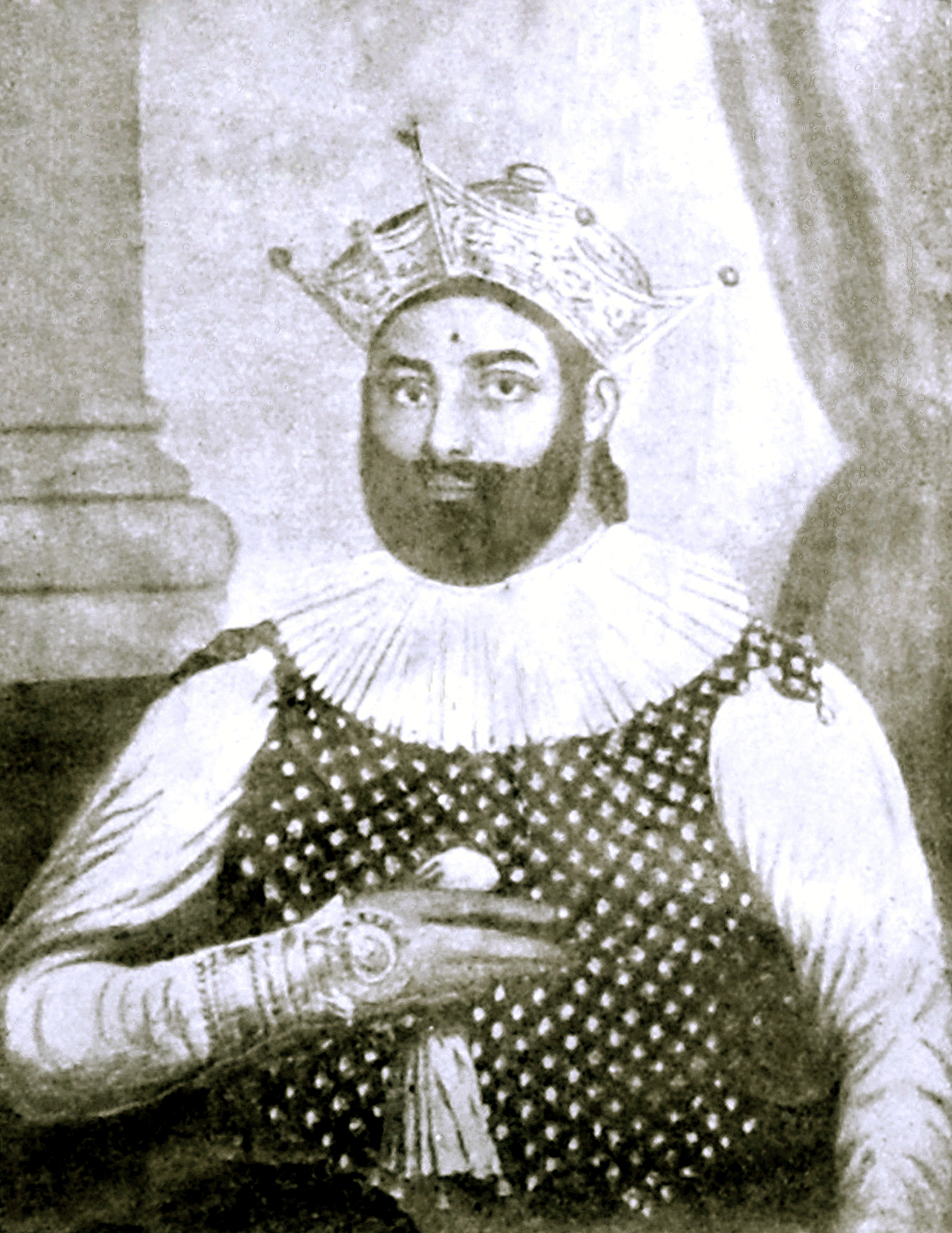
- Last to reign Sri Vikrama Rajasinha; 17 July 1798 – 10 February 1815

Details
- Style: His Majesty
- First monarch: Senasammata Vikramabahu
- Last monarch: Vikrama Rajasinha
- Formed: 1469
- Abolished: 1815
- Residence: Royal Palace

Monarchical Sri Lanka
- Part of a series on the politics and government of the Sinhala kingdom

Royal Court
- Monarch: King
- Queen consort: Randolis
- Sub king / Heir apparent: Yuvaraja
- Other queens: Rididoli
- Wife or Concubinage: Yakadadoli

Amātya Mandalaya (Council of State)
- 1st Prime Minister: Pallegampahê Adikâram Mahatmayâ
- 2nd Prime Minister: Udagampahê Adikâram Mahatmayâ
- 3rd Prime Minister: Siyapattuwa Adikâram Mahatmayâ
- Chief Secretary: Mahâ Mohottâla
- Provincial Governors: Mahâ Dissâvas
- Royal Household Officers: Dugganna Nilamês
- Sons of Chiefs: Bandâras

The Kandyan Monarchy was the last independent monarchy of Sri Lanka, ruled by a succession of monarchs from the Kingdom of Kandy. This monarchy spanned over 230 years from 1590 to 1815 and played a significant role in shaping the country's history and culture. The Kandyan kings enjoyed absolute power, and their rule was marked by complex administrative systems, religious traditions, and cultural practices. This list of Kandyan monarchs provides an overview of the rulers who led the Kingdom of Kandy throughout its existence, from its early formation to its final downfall under British colonial rule.

== History of Kandyan Monarchs ==
The kingdom of Kandy was originally a principality of the kingdom of Kotte, until Senasammata Vikramabahu declared Kandy an independent state in 1469, establishing himself as its first king. However, the kingdom was later conquered by Rajasinghe I of Sitawaka in 1581, marking the end of the first phase of the kingdom under the Siri Sangha Bo dynasty. In 1592, Vimaladharmasuriya I reestablished the kingdom with his dynasty, earning him the title of the Kandyan Kingdom's second founder. During his reign, Kandy became a major political power and the sole successor of Sri Lanka's ancient Anuradhapura, Polonnaruwa, and Kotte kingdoms. The Dinaraja dynasty handed over the kingdom to the Nayakkar Dynasty in 1739 due to a lack of successors, ending the second phase of the kingdom. The Nayakkar Dynasty, which began with Sri Vijaya Rajasinha, was seen as a great religious revival by the people, but the last king of this dynasty, Sri Wickrama Rajasinghe's reign witnessed the gradual decline of the kingdom, leading to the abolition of the king's position in the kingdom in 1815. This resulted in the absorption of the kingdom into the British Empire and marked the end of the Sinhalese monarchy that had started back in 437 BC.

== Authority and governance of the Kandyan monarch ==
The King of Kandy was the supreme ruler of the Kingdom of Kandy. His power was absolute and supreme, and while his ministers could offer advice, they could not control his will. The King held the authority to make peace and war, enact laws and regulations, and enforce the death penalty.

The king exercises both civil and criminal judicial authority, either in original jurisdiction or in appeal. The actions of the government are believed to be guided by the customs and traditions of the kingdom. Consultation with the main chiefs and frequently the leading priests is customary before significant changes are implemented or during public affairs discussions. Many state officials are responsible for the king's authority, including the three Adikarams, known as Adikars, who are the main officers involved in the administration of public affairs. The Desaves, or provincial governors, were primarily located below the mountains of the kingdom of Kandy, while the Rate Mahatmeyo or governors of smaller districts were above the mountains. The Kandyan chiefs and all other subjects show respect to the king by making obeisance with three prostrations and communicate with him on their knees.

== House of Siri Sanga Bo (1473–1592) ==
Portrait	Name	Birth	Death	King From	King Until	Relationship with Predecessor(s)
	Senasammata Vikramabahu	-	-	1469	1511	*Belongs to Kotte Royal Blood line *Leader of the Kandyan secession from Kotte
	Jayavira Bandara	-	-	1511	1552	*Son of Senasammata
	Karalliyadde Bandara	-	-	1552	1582	*Son of Jayaweera
	Kusumasana Devi	-	-	1582	1582	*Daughter of Karalliyadde
	Rajasinha I (a.k.a. Tikiri Banda or Sitawaka Rajasinha)	1544	1593	1582	1590	*Deposed Kusumasana Devi

== House of Dinajara (1590–1739) ==
Portrait	Name	Birth	Death	King From	King Until	Relationship with Predecessor(s)
	Vimaladharmasuriya I	-	1604	1590	1604	*Husband of Kusumasana Devi
	Senarat	-	1635	1604	1635	*Cousin or half-brother of Vimala Dharma Suriya I
	Rajasinghe II	1608	December 6, 1687	1635	November 25, 1687	*Son of Senarat and Kusumasana Devi
	Vimaladharmasurya II	-	June 4, 1707	1687	June 4, 1707	*Son of King Rajasinghe II
	Vira Narendra Sinha (a.k.a. Sri Vira Parakrama Narendra Singha)	1690	May 13, 1739	June 4, 1707	May 13, 1739	*Son of Vimala Dharma Suriya II

== House of Kandy Nayakar (1739–1815) ==
Portrait	Name	Birth	Death	King From	King Until	Relationship with Predecessor(s)
	Sri Vijaya Rajasinha (a.k.a. Rajasimha III)	-	August 11, 1747	May 13, 1739	August 11, 1747	*Brother-in-law of Narendra Singha
	Kirti Sri Rajasinha	1734	January 2, 1782	August 11, 1747	January 2, 1782	*Sri Vijaya Raja Singha's wife's eldest brother from Madura
	Sri Rajadhi Rajasinha	-	July 26, 1798	January 2, 1782	July 26, 1798	*Brother of Kirthi Sri Raja Singha
	Sri Vikrama Rajasinha (a.k.a. Rajasimha IV)	1780	Jan 30, 1832	July 26, 1798	March 5, 1815	*Nephew of Sri Rajadhi Raja Singha

== See also ==
- Kingdom of Kandy
- List of Sri Lankan monarchs

Uduwara Nilame subsequently assumed the mantle of Uduwara Hettias, adopting the Portuguese surname (Pereira) while asserting authority as traders. It is widely held that they were the rightful sovereigns, following the Nayakkars, as Uduwara Nilame safeguarded the last king and maintained the lineage of the Ranabahu royal bloodline
