= Appuhami =

Sinhali Surname

Monarchical Sri Lanka
- Part of a series on the politics and government of the Sinhala kingdom

Royal Court
- Monarch: King
- Queen consort: Randolis
- Sub king / Heir apparent: Yuvaraja
- Other queens: Rididoli
- Wife or Concubinage: Yakadadoli

Amātya Mandalaya (Council of State)
- 1st Prime Minister: Pallegampahê Adikâram Mahatmayâ
- 2nd Prime Minister: Udagampahê Adikâram Mahatmayâ
- 3rd Prime Minister: Siyapattuwa Adikâram Mahatmayâ
- Chief Secretary: Mahâ Mohottâla
- Provincial Governors: Mahâ Dissâvas
- Royal Household Officers: Dugganna Nilamês
- Sons of Chiefs: Bandâras

Appuhamy, also referred as Appuhami,(Sinhala: අප්පුහාමි) from Appu (Gentleman) and Hami (Lord) (Hamie is a derivation of Sanskrit word Swami) is a Sinhala surname or an honorific term for men used traditionally between 14th and 20th centuries in Sri Lanka (Ceylon). It is also a term used for Dugganna Nilame of Kandyan era kings. Appuhamy served as an honorific title during the period of the Sinhalese kingdom, similar to titles such as Rala, Nilame, and Banda. It was sometimes used interchangeably with Rala and Nilame. During the reign of King Rajasingha II, the title Appuhamy was used for district governors. The Mahadisawa of Satkorale at the time was referred to as Tennakoon Appuhamy.

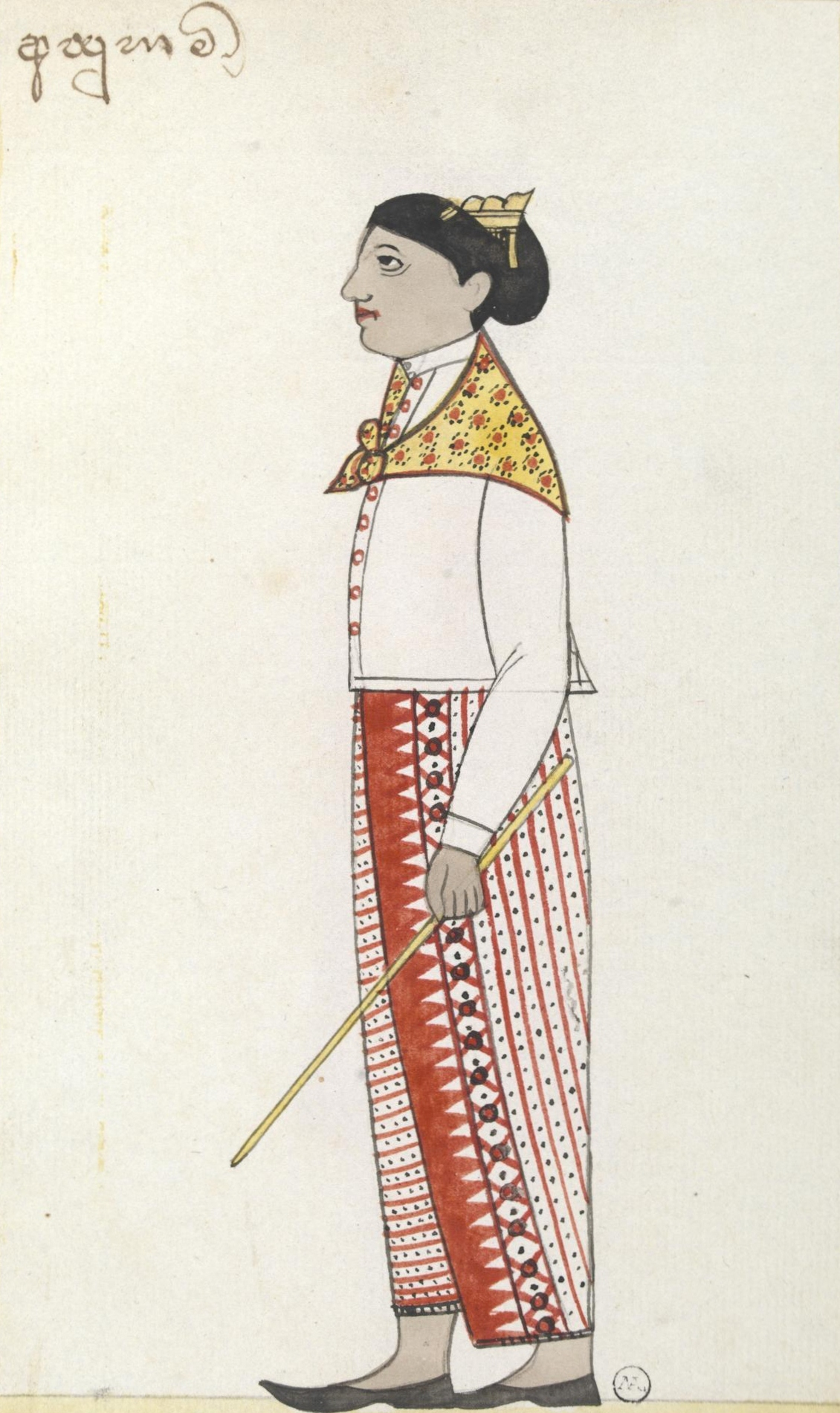
An Appuhamy - ca. 1830 (Painted) Victoria and Albert Museum London.

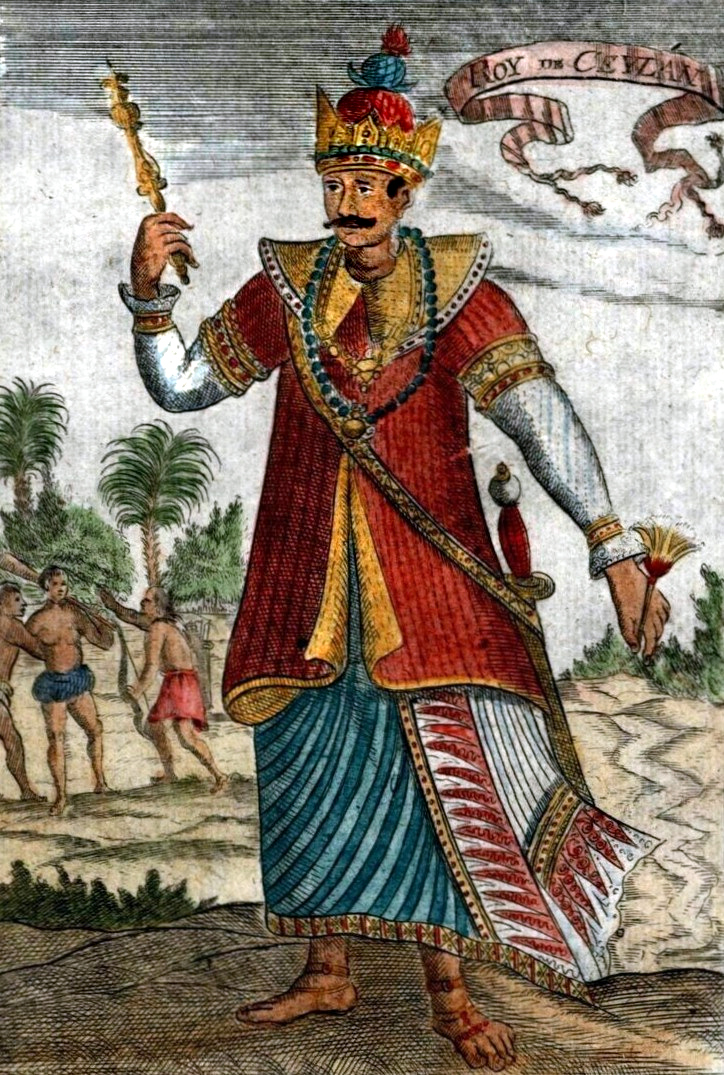
In later periods, Prince Don John, who later became Don John Appuhamy prior to his winning the Kandyan throne under the name of King Wimaladharmasuriya, was renowned as above, according to Baldius.

== Kandyan era ==
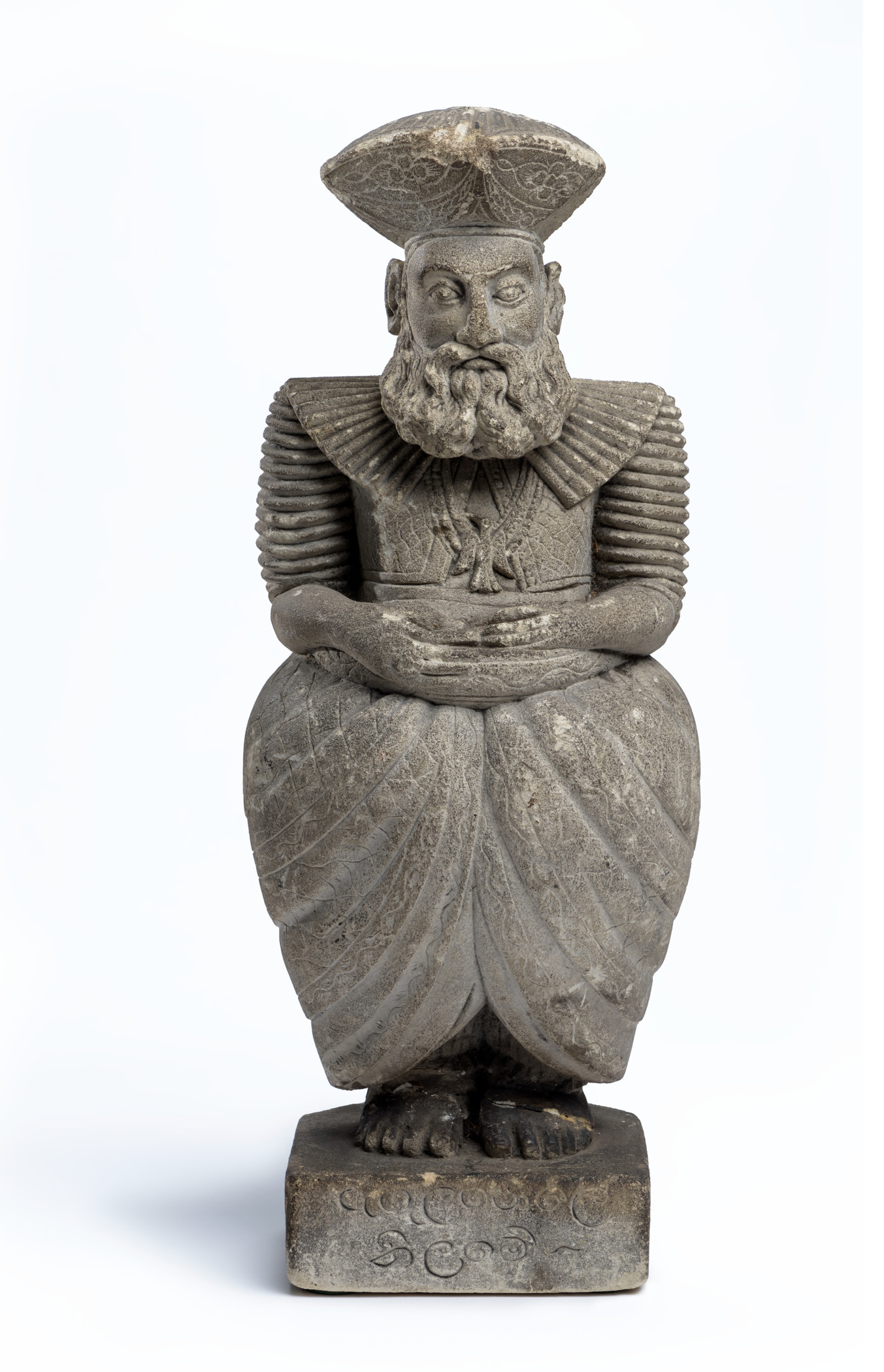
Ehelepola Maha Nilame was an Appuhamy for HM at the beginning of his career.

In the beginning, Appuhamy's belongs from the members of the three families referred to as chamberlains. They rendered their services to the royalty as watchmen or guardsmen of the Barrier of Royal Bed Chamber (Hathapenage), the Royal Time Keepers Point (Atapattu Murapola) and the Royal Gold Weaponry or Armory (Ran Avuda Mandapa). The title of Appuhamy was given as a mark of respect and appreciation. Alternative titles were Dugganna Rala or Dugganna Nilame.

Hathapenage

The Hathapanage Appuhamy's served under officers named Muhandiram Nilame of the Maha Hathapenage, the secretary, and Kankanama. Of them, 12 guards used to hold a stabbing equipment, named Illukkole. It was their custom to wear a mouth guard (mask) when in Majesty's service. This was a white cloth ribbon about one inch in breadth. Earlier, this mouth guard was two inches in breadth. In this garment, the piece exactly covering the mouth was a red piece of cloth called Paccawadam, while the rest of the cloth was white.

Atapattu Murapola

The Royal Time Keepers Point was also known as The Water Clock Gate. Earlier they were 50 to 60 in number but the last Sinhala King brought it down to 48. Putting the water clock plates in position and accompany the King while touring was one of their duties. The Atapattu Maduwa was a building place close to the Royal Palace. Those serving here placed four water clock plates in the pond and to inform the time, they rang a bell. They had divided the daytime into parts and the night into four Jamas or Phases in such a manner.

Time periods	Phases
From dawn to the end of eighth Sinhala hour	1st Phase
From ninth Sinhala hour to end of fifteenth hour (mid day)	2nd Phase
From mid day to end of 7th hour	3rd Phase
From 8th hour to end of 15th hour	4th Phase

The night also was thus divided into 8-7-7-8 hourly four phases. According to this, the bell was rung once, twice, thrice, 4–8, 6, 5–1, times. Auspicious times for each function was declared via this medium. During daytime, more than three Appuhamy's did serve rarely. Half of those who came for the night shift slept while the rest did guarding duty.

Ran Avudu Mandapa

While the king toured, it was their duty to carry various weapons to serve the king. The Lacquer-craftsmen Archers living in Matale Hapuvida Village supplied lacquer-worked decorated handles for carrying the items.

== Appuhamy principles ==
The Appuhamy officers belonged to families with proven loyalty and sacrificial devotion to the King. They commanded high respect and honour from the countrymen. The post of becoming an Appuhamy was competitive and highly contested as they were the starting points of other vital position within the King's kingdom.

When King Veera Parakrama Narendra Singha presented the opinion that it would suffice if Appuhamy's served the King every alternate month, in shifts, like other officers within the kingdom, the Appuhamy's collectively declined the proposition with the reason that they would fall into the same despicable level of lethargy and inefficiency as other officers. The Appuhamy's appealed to the King to grant them permission to render continued services and when they would want a release from services for personal reasons, they would send the request for prior approval from the Throne.

During the time of King Rajadhi Raja Singha in his Hathapenage Murapola, there were 112 Appuhamy's in service. The number reduced to 48 by the time the last King of Sinhala took throne.

== Privileges conferred on the Appuhamys ==
They could go past the queens. They were not under the charge of the high officers like adikaram and dissawe. Appuhamys enjoyed various rights, privileges, and incomes generated from their lands and services to the king. They were bound to bring the pingo of rice (kath hal) as a rajakariya, the duty to the royals. At given times, they were exempted from this duty. Yet, in case it was not stated down in the lekampotha (the secretarial book), the exemption was only temporary.

For each of the duggannarala, a village and a man was allocated. The villagers did the cultivation work for free in his fields. They looked after his lands and repaired his walauwa, the stately mansion. The villagers supplied the monthly requirement of rice. A month's requirement was termed as barak (a weight), namely 60 hundus (hundu=4/1 measure). A hundu contained 8, at times 9 or 10 palm fulls.

A designated man called agubalana nilame, the royal tester, tested the prepared royal victuals supplied to the king for consumption. This tasting was effected as a pre-testing as to whether the victuals were contaminated with any poison. Agubalana Nilamen was also considered as a duggannarala.

== Other applications of Appuhamy ==
The term, Appuhamy, were used in various other contexts:

- An honorary titled received by royal appointment.
- Members of Govi caste families, such as Yapa Appuhamilage, Epa Appuhamilage and Wijayasundra Appuhamilage used Appuhamilage or Appuhamillage as the "Ge" name.
- In the words of Baldius (LCS, p. 99), the Govi Vamsa had two divisions, known as Appuhamy and Saparamadu Appuhamy.
- Prince Don John, who later became Don John Appuhamy prior to winning the Kandyan throne under the name of King Wimaladharmasuriya was renowned as Appuhamy, according to Baldius.
- As a part of a personal name,Don Carolis Appuhamy,Hinni Appuhamy,etc. can be quoted.

== See also ==
- Govigama
- Radala
- Mudiyanse
- Sinhalese people
