= Bandāra =

Monarchical Sri Lanka
- Part of a series on the politics and government of the Sinhala kingdom

Royal Court
- Monarch: King
- Queen consort: Randolis
- Sub king / Heir apparent: Yuvaraja
- Other queens: Rididoli
- Wife or Concubinage: Yakadadoli

Amātya Mandalaya (Council of State)
- 1st Prime Minister: Pallegampahê Adikâram Mahatmayâ
- 2nd Prime Minister: Udagampahê Adikâram Mahatmayâ
- 3rd Prime Minister: Siyapattuwa Adikâram Mahatmayâ
- Chief Secretary: Mahâ Mohottâla
- Provincial Governors: Mahâ Dissâvas
- Royal Household Officers: Dugganna Nilamês
- Sons of Chiefs: Bandâras

A Bandâra was a Great Officer in the Amātya Mandalaya, or Sinhalese Council of State, in the Sinhalese Kingdoms of premodern Sri Lanka. A Bandâra was the sons of a chief in the Sinhala Kingdom.

== See also ==
- Radala
- Sri Lankan titles
