= S. N. W. Hulugalle =

Sri Lankan politician

Semasinghe Navaratne Wanninaake Hulugalle (known as S. N. W. Hulugalle Adigar until 1915) was a Ceylonese colonial-era legislator and a headmen. He was representative of the Kandyans in the Legislative Council of Ceylon. He was appointed to an Adigar from which he was removed after the Riots of 1915.

Born as C. Jayatilleke, he later changed his name to S. N. W. Hulugalle and was educated at Christian College, Kotte. His uncle was John Graham Jayatilleke, the first Kandyan Proctor and Notary Public.

Joining the public service as a clerk in 1868, he was appointed Ratemahatmaya in 1875. In April 1900, he was appointed as the unofficial member representing the Kandyan Sinhalese in the Legislative Council, while serving as Ratemahatmaya. In 1903 he was given the titular rank of Dissawe. He step down from the Legislative Council in 1906 and was awarded the titular rank of Adigar. He was succeeded by Theodore Barcroft L. Moonemalle. He retired from public service in 1913. However following the 1915 riots, he was stripped of the title of Adigar in 1915 by the British Government of Ceylon. His son-in-law P. B. Herat was the first Kandian member of the Ceylon Civil Service.

== See also ==
- Radala
