= Sinhalese monarchy =

Monarchy of Sri Lanka (543 BCE–1815 CE)

King of the Sinhalese Kingdom
- සිංහල ද්වීපයේ රජ
- Royal Standard of the King of Kandy in 1815

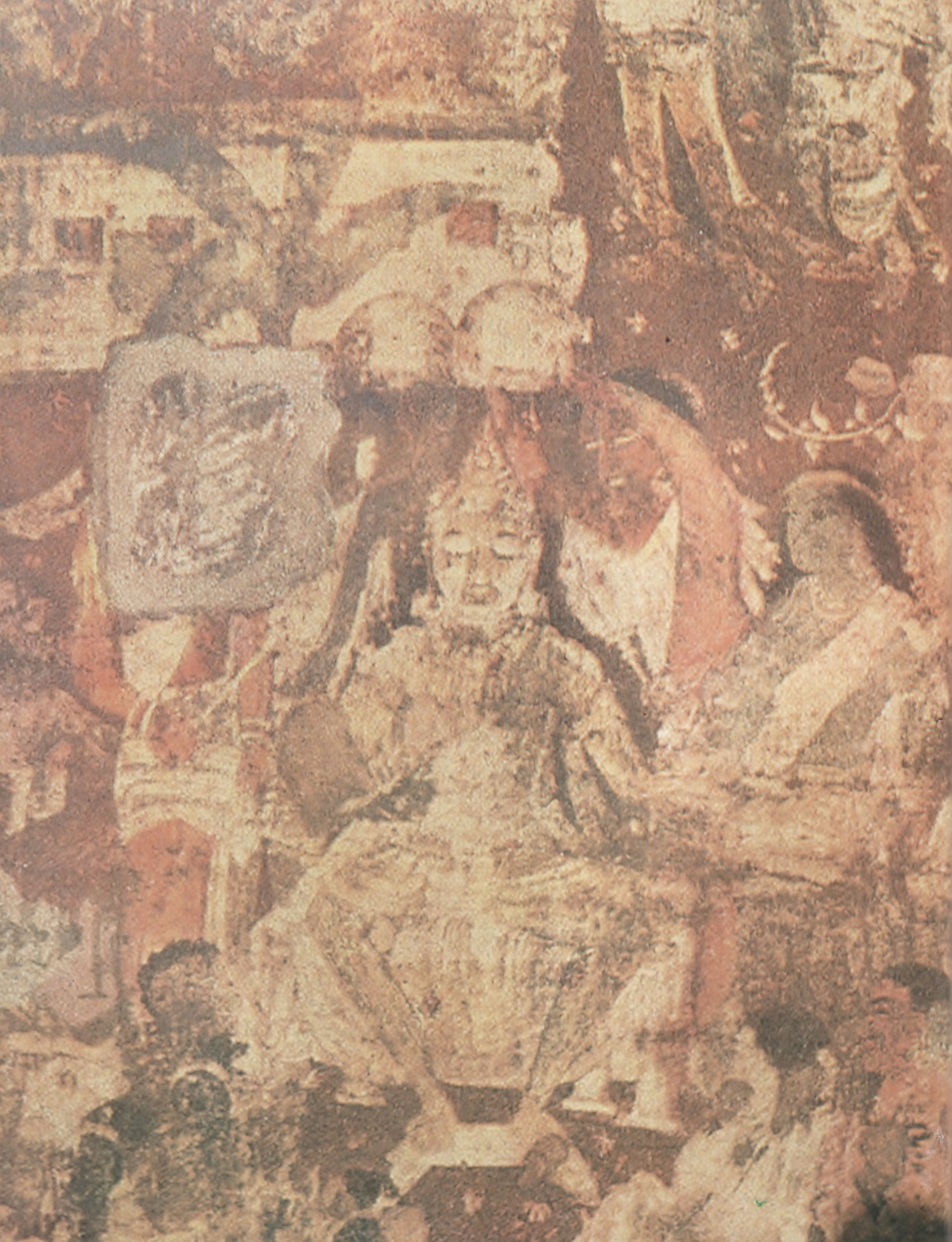
- Vijaya

Details
- First monarch: Vijaya (Vamsa katha) / Simhala (Divyavadana/Jataka)
- Last monarch: Sri Vikrama Rajasinha
- Formed: 543 BC
- Abolished: 2 March 1815
- Residence: Capital of Sri Lanka

Monarchical Sri Lanka
- Part of a series on the politics and government of the Sinhala kingdom

Royal Court
- Monarch: King
- Queen consort: Randolis
- Sub king / Heir apparent: Yuvaraja
- Other queens: Rididoli
- Wife or Concubinage: Yakadadoli

Amātya Mandalaya (Council of State)
- 1st Prime Minister: Pallegampahê Adikâram Mahatmayâ
- 2nd Prime Minister: Udagampahê Adikâram Mahatmayâ
- 3rd Prime Minister: Siyapattuwa Adikâram Mahatmayâ
- Chief Secretary: Mahâ Mohottâla
- Provincial Governors: Mahâ Dissâvas
- Royal Household Officers: Dugganna Nilamês
- Sons of Chiefs: Bandâras

The Sinhalese monarchy (Sinhala සිංහල රාජාණ්ඩුව) has its origins in the settlement of North Indian Indo-Aryan immigrants to the island of Sri Lanka. The Landing of Vijay as described in the traditional chronicles of the island, the Dipavamsa, Mahavamsa and Culavamsa, and later chronicles, recount the date of the establishment of the first Sinhala Kingdom in 543 BC (Note: This is the most common date.) when Prince Vijaya (543–505 BC), an Indian Prince, and 700 of his followers are claimed to have landed on the island of Sri Lanka and established the Kingdom of Tambapanni. In Sinhalese mythology, Prince Vijaya and followers are told to be the progenitors of the Sinhalese people. However according to the story in the Divyavadana, the immigrants were probably not led by a scion of a royal house in India, as told in the romantic legend, but rather may have been groups of adventurous and pioneering merchants exploring new lands.

The Sinhalese monarch was the head of state of the Sinhala Kingdom (Sri Lanka) (Note: A collective term referred to all the Sinhalese kingdoms.). Anachronistically referred to as the Kings of Sri Lanka, (Note: The name Sri Lanka refers to the modern democratic state.) the monarch held absolute power and succession was hereditary. The monarchy comprised the reigning monarch, their family, and the royal household which supports and facilitates the monarch in the exercise of his royal duties and prerogatives. The monarchy existed for over 2300 years. Tambapanni and its successive kingdoms were situated in what is presently Sri Lanka. The monarchy ended with Sri Vikrama Rajasinha of Kandy in 1815 after generations of European influences and upheaval in the royal court.

== Origin ==
The origins of the early Sinhalese kings are the settlement of North Indian Indo-Aryan immigrants to the island of Sri Lanka. Sri Lankan historian Senarath Paranavithana suggests, and according to the story in the Divyavadana, the immigrants were probably not led by a scion of a royal house in India, as told in the romantic legend, but rather may have been groups of adventurous and pioneering merchants exploring new lands. These immigrants would have been of all ages and probably originated from multiple regions, arriving in more than one stream, each with its own leader. We know from early Pali writings that Indian merchants of the time travelled to the island in search of the pearls on its North Western coast and precious stones in the island's interior. In the course of time some of the settlers would have settled down in order to supply valued merchandise to their compatriots who would periodically visit the island.

As these settlements grew, the necessity for some form of government would so too. Paranavithana puts forward that the most natural form of government would have been to elect one of them as a magistrate of each settlement. It is probable that some of the immigrants came from areas of India under a republican form of government. The descendants of these leaders of each settlement would have been called Parumaka, according to early Brahmi inscriptions. These various settlements would have over time felt the need for a common leader, a commander in times of war and chief magistrate in times of peace. This chief would have been known as Gamani (leader). However, there was probably more than one such gamani on the island. It is possible this common leader also had the title of Mahaparumaka.

Paranavithana hypothesised that the earliest Sinhalese kings may have actually been these elected common leaders called Gamani. This theory is supported through statements in the Mahavamsa-Tika. As each were elected, there were nothing to stop from the gamani's son to succeed his father, should he be good enough. Thus the principle of hereditary leadership would gradually be established and the position would soon possess powers equal to that of a king. However, the pomp and paraphernalia of kinship was probably absent.

As according to Indian belief, at the time, to be acknowledged as a sovereign it was necessary to have an abhiṣeka ceremony, a consecration rite which the settlers could not do on their own. It has become clear that before Devanampiya Tissa of Anuradhapura, the Sinhalese monarchs did not have an abhiṣeka ceremony performed on them, leaving the reasonable conclusion that the monarchs before Devanampiya Tissa were instead popular sanctioned leaders. This is also supported by the fact that the writer of the Mahavamsa lived in a time where the main form of government was a monarchy, and so it was natural to assume that whenever a ruler was mentioned, it was a king with the paraphernalia of royalty attributed to him.

Paranavithana argues that Mauryan Emperor Ashoka introduced the institution of kingship to the Sinhalese people. The title Devanampiya ("Beloved of The Gods"), a Maurayan royal title assumed by Tissa, who later became Devanampiya Tissa, and his successors for two hundred years after him.

== History ==
=== Pre Anuradhapura period ===
According to the Mahavamsa, the great chronicles of the island the Kingdom of Tambapanni was founded by Prince Vijaya and his 700 followers after landing on the island, in a district near modern-day Mannar which is believed to be the district of Chilaw, after leaving Suppāraka. It is recorded that Vijaya made his landing on the day of Buddha's death. Vijaya claimed Tambapanni his capital. Tambapanni was originally inhabited and governed by Yakkhas, having their capital at Sirīsavatthu and their queen Kuveni. According to the Samyutta Commentary, Tambapanni was one hundred leagues in extent.

During the end of his reign Vijaya, who was having trouble choosing a successor, sent a letter to the city of his ancestors, Sinhapura, in order to invite his brother Sumitta to take over the throne. However Vijaya had died before the letter had reached its destination so the elected minister of the people Upatissa, the Chief government minister or Prime minister and leading chief among the new settlers became regent and acted for a year. In his regency, Upatissa established the new capital Upatissa Nuwara, named after himself, in which the kingdom was moved from Tambapanni. It was seven or eight miles north of the previous capital. When Vijaya's letter arrived Sumitta had already succeeded his father as king, and so he sent his son Panduvasdeva to rule Upatissa Nuwara.

=== Anuradhapura period ===
The reign of Tissa marks not only important religious historical developments but also important political history of the island and to the Sinhalese people. It marked the introduction of Buddhism to the island and with it came the formal establishment of kingship and monarchy. Though it saw productive advances in the areas of economics, technology and culture, during the Early Anuradhapura period (137 BC – 684 AD) the political system was at its most brittle. The stresses of dynastic rivalries and succession disputes sparked many political crises. This period was dominated by the rivalry between the House of Lambakanna and the House of Moriya. Both powerful clans whose origins trace back to the time of Tissa. With the end of the House of Vijaya the Lambakannas were established as their successors, the Moriyas however challenged this claim and struggles for the throne ensued. The Moriyan claims to the throne diminished by the end of the seventh century leaving the Lambakannas a monopoly of power. New laws of succession would further consolidate this. Political instability can be seen as the rule rather that the exception during this period.

=== Polonnaruwa period ===
With the fall of Polonnaruwa the monarchy saw a decline in the 13th century, this is characterised by the succession of capitals that followed.

=== Transitional period ===
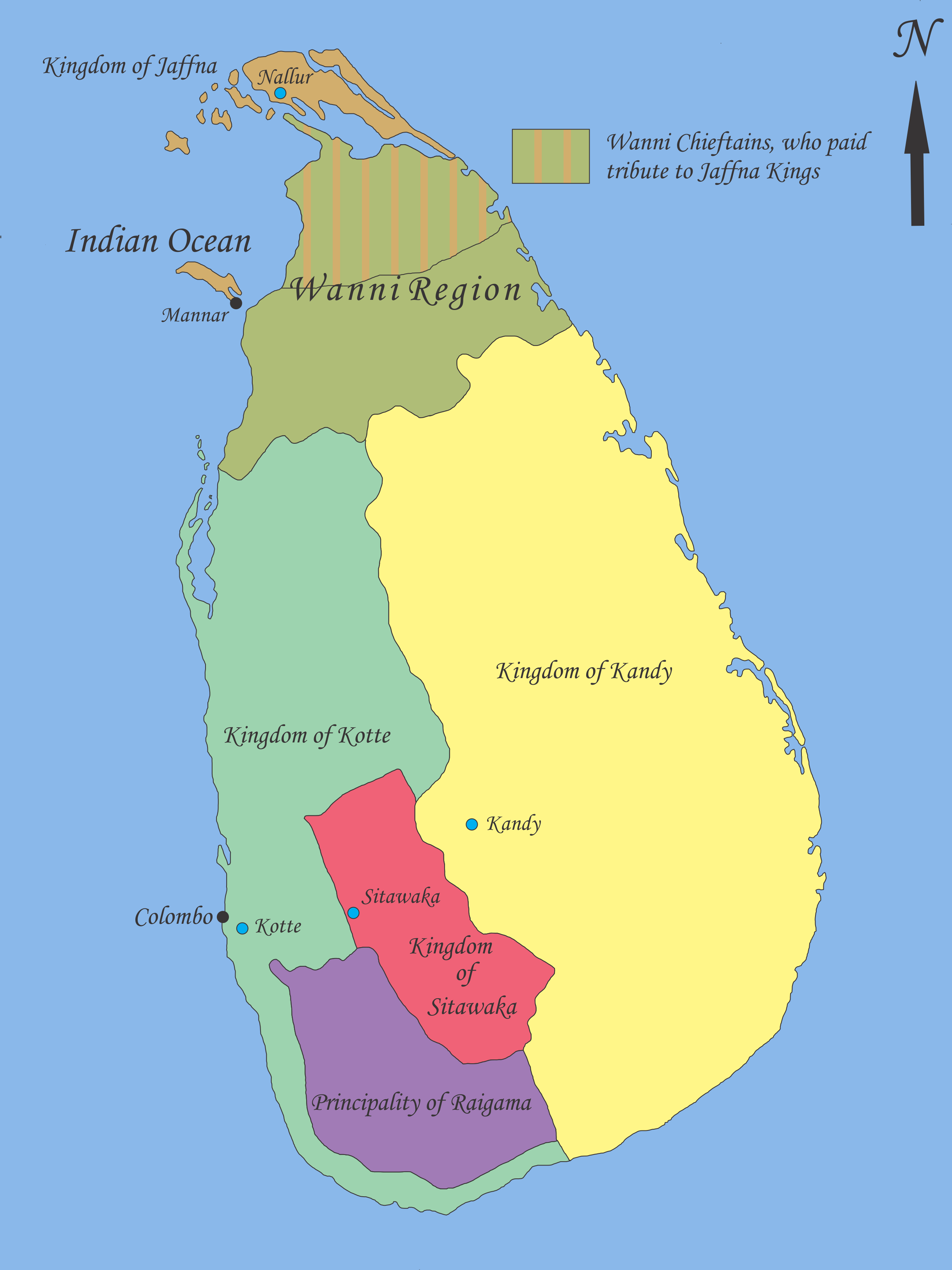
Map showing geopolitical situation in the Sinhalese Kingdom in the early part of 16th century after the "Spoiling of Vijayabahu" in 1521.

This period saw the arrival of Europeans to the island and their influence.

=== Kandyan period ===
In 1796 the British first entered the island and gained control of the coastal areas from the Dutch. After the Kandyan Wars and the signing of the Kandyan Convention in 1815 the island recognized the British monarch as Sovereign. This ended 2,357 years of indigenous Sinhalese monarchy.

== Role ==
=== Political role ===
As absolute monarch the king was head of state, however he would be aided with high level officials and a board of ministers. The monarch was seen as the supreme ruler throughout the island, even at times when he did not have absolute control over it. They sought to establish control over the whole island, though in reality this was more of an aspiration. However periods of effective control over the whole island did exist from time to time.

During the Anuradhapura period royal officials were divided into three categories; officials attached to the palace, officials of central administration and officials of provincial administration. One of the most important positions was the Purohita, the advisor to the king. The king also had a board of ministers called Amati paheja. In central administration, Senapati (Commander-in-Chief of the Army) was a position second only to the king, and held by a member of the nobility. This position, and also the positions of Yuvaraja (sub king), administrative positions in the country's provinces and major ports and provinces, were often held by relatives of the monarch.

The kingdom was often divided into sections or provinces and governed separately. Over time these administrative units within the island increased. By the reign of Silakala (518–31) there were already three provinces, two of which he handed over to his sons to administer, while retaining the province of Rajarata, the area around the capital, directly under his administration. Ruhuna (southern part of the country) and the Malaya Rata (hill country) were governed by officials called Apa and Mapa. These administrative units were further divided into smaller units called rata. Officials called Ratiya or Ratika were in charge of these. (Note: This position was called Rataladda by the later period of the Anuradhapura Kingdom.) The smallest administrative unit was the gama (village), under a village chief known as gamika or gamladda.

=== Judicial role ===
As well as holding political powers the Sinhalese monarch also held judicial power and influence. Judicial customs, traditions and moral principles based on Buddhism were used as the bases of law. The laws and legal measures were proclaimed by the king, and were to be followed by justice administration. Several rock inscriptions that record these proclamations have been found in archaeological excavations.

The judiciary consisted of the chief judicial officer known as the Viniccayamacca and there were several judicial officers under him, known as Vinicchayaka. Apart from them, village headmen and provincial governors were also given the power to issue judgments. Initially, the administration of justice at village level was the responsibility of village assemblies, which usually consisted of the elders of the village. However, towards the end of the Anuradhapura Kingdom a group of ten villages, known as dasagam, was responsible for upholding justice in that area. Punishments differed from ruler to ruler. Some kings, such as Siri Sangha Bodhi I (247–249) and Voharika Tissa (209–231) were lenient in this aspect, while rulers like Ilanaga (33–43) and Jettha Tissa (263–273) were harsher. However, crimes such as treason, murder and slaughter of cattle were generally punishable by death.

The king was the final judge in legal disputes, and all cases against members of the royal family and high dignitaries of the state were judged by him. However, the king had to exercise this power with care and after consulting with his advisers. Udaya recorded judgments that were regarded as important precedents in the royal library in order to maintain uniformity in judicial decisions.

=== Religious role ===
A close link existed between the ruler and the Sangha (Buddhist priesthood) since the introduction of Buddhism to the country. This relationship was further strengthened during Dutugamunu's reign. The monks often advised and even guided the king on decisions. This association was initially with the Mahavihara sect, but by the middle of the 1st century BC, the Abhayagiri sect had also begun to have a close link to the ruling of the country. By the end of the 3rd century AD, the Jetavana sect had also become close to the ruler. Estrangements between the ruler and the priesthood often weakened the government, as happened during the reign of Lanjatissa. Even Valagamba's resistance movement was initially hampered because of a rift with the Mahavihara, and he succeeded only after a reconciliation was effected. Some rulers patronized only one sect, but this often led to unrest in the country and most rulers equally supported all sects. Despite this, religious establishments were often plundered during times of internal strife by the rulers themselves, such as during the reigns of Dathopa Tissa I (639–650) and Kassapa II (650–659).

== Succession ==
The kingdom was under the rule of a king or queen. The succession of the throne was patrilineal, or if that cannot be the case, inherited by the eldest brother of the previous king. However few queens have also reigned. During the early centuries of the Anuradhapura Kingdom laws of succession to the throne was not clearly recognised. The ruling monarch would choose a member of the royal family to succeed him or her, usually a son or brother, and these wishes went generally unchallenged. It was with the second establishment of the House of Lambakanna that succession became to depend on more established rules and practises. During this period brother succeeded brother and then on to the next generation. Political stability also gave way for smoother transitions of power, the spread of Mahayanaist ideas that kingship was akin to divinity increased the sanctity of the monarch. This development meant that pretenders and rivals to the throne had a much harder time claiming succession even during the reigns of relatively weak monarchs. Disputed successions were the root cause to the political instability of the kingdom before these developments.

=== Accession & End of reign ===
The king or queen would ascend the throne through the ceremony of an abhiṣeka, a consecration rite similar to that of a coronation. The consecration ceremonies and rituals associated with kingship began during the reign of Devanampiya Tissa, under the influence of Ashoka of India. However, in the Mahavamsa it is portrayed that an abhiṣeka ceremonies began with Vijaya.

This included a right spiralled chank, that was produced in the sea, filled with water from the lake Anotatta.

=== Regency & Interregnums ===
Four interregnums existed during the kingdom.

== Monarchs ==
There have been 184 monarchs that have reigned over nine successive kingdoms. (Note: Sena and Guttika is considered one reign.) Of these, five, Anula of Anuradhapura, Sivali of Anuradhapura, Chattagahaka Jantu of Anuradhapura, Lilavati of Polonnaruwa and Kalyanavati of Polonnaruwa have been Queens. Each monarch belongs to one of nine royal houses (Vijaya, Lambakanna I, Moriya, Lambakanna II, Vijayabahu, Kalinga, Siri Sanga Bo and Nayaks). The Sinhalese Monarchy has also been reigned over by foreigners from Southern India which has occurred several times throughout the course of the monarchy. This is usually occurred through the usurpation of the throne.

During the early kingdoms all monarchs belonged to the House of Vijaya or the Vijayan dynasty. Named for Prince Vijaya, who is seen as the progenitor of the Sinhalese people, the dynasty continued into the Anuradhapura Kingdom until Subharaja (60–67). (Note: This is also known as the Anuradhapura dynasty, starting from Pandukabhaya.)

During the Anuradhapura period four dynasties ruled the kingdom from its founding to its end. Pandukabhaya, who was the last ruler of Upatissa Nuwara and the first ruler of the Anuradhapura Kingdom was a Vijayan. The Vijayan dynasty existed until Vasabha of the Lambakanna clan seized power in 66 AD. His ascension to the throne saw the start of the first Lambakanna dynasty, which ruled the country for more than three centuries. A new dynasty began with Dhatusena in 455. Named the Moriya dynasty, the origins of this line are uncertain although some historians trace them to Shakya princes who accompanied the sapling of the Sri Maha Bodhi to Sri Lanka. The last dynasty of the Anuradhapura period, the second Lambakanna dynasty, started with Manavanna (684–718) seizing the throne in 684 and continued till the last ruler of Anuradhapura, Mahinda V.

=== Styles, titles, and symbols ===
Styles

Titles

The Sinhalese monarchs have over time had many royal titles, both common to the Buddhist and ancient world as well as unique titles to the island. The monarch's title is "King" (male) or "Queen" (female), known as "Raja" in Sinhalese. Some early ancient royal titles were adopted from pre monarchy era.

Throne

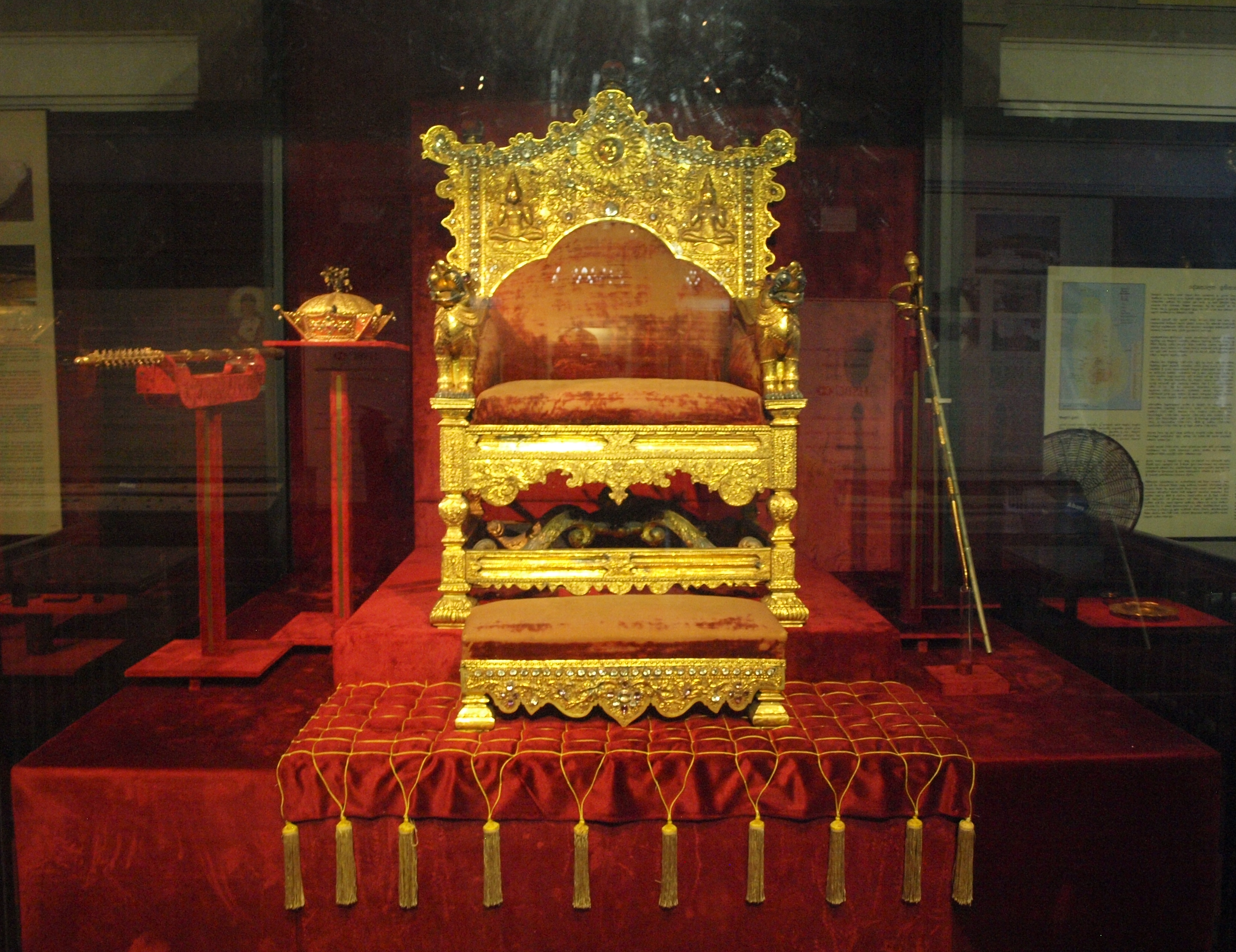
Throne of Kandyan Kings

Sceptres

Before the institution of monarchy, the gamani would wield authority by possession of 3 yatthi, yatthi being a staff or Sceptre. These sceptres were a symbol of authority to the rulers of the island before Devanampiya Tissa and the introduction of kingship, after which it would assume regal honours. According to the Mahavamsa each sceptre contained magical qualities, although the Mahavamsa-Tika only speaks of one yatthi existing. Paranavithana suggests that the three sceptres might have signified the overlordship of the divisions on the island, Rajarata, Ruhuna and Malayarata. However, there is no evidence to show these divisions existed from such an early time. But the Mahabodhivamsa mentions three royal parasols of Devanampiya Tissa, named respectively Andha, Cola, and Sihala. It is said these sceptres and other treasures miraculously appeared when Devanampiya Tissa was anointed to become king.

Tooth Relic of the Buddha

During the reign of Devanampiya Tissa (307–267 BC) saw the introduction of Buddhism to the country through Ashoka of India. By the time of Sirimeghavanna (301–328), Sudatta, the sub king of Kalinga, and Hemamala brought the Tooth Relic of the Buddha to Sri Lanka because of unrest in the country. Kithsirimevan carried it in procession and placed the relic in a mansion named Datadhatughara. He ordered this procession to be held annually, and this is still done as a tradition in the country. The Tooth Relic of the Buddha after some centuries became one of the most sacred objects in the country, and a symbol of kingship. The person who was in possession of the Tooth Relic thereafter would be the rightful ruler of the country.

Other items

With the development of the monarchy also came the royal regalia of the time. Emperor Asoka sent the necessary things for Devanampiya Tissa to be consecrated as king. This included "three chanks, including a chank produced in the sea, water from the Ganges, ruddy coloured mud, eight each of Khattiya, Brahmana, and Gahapati virgins, eight each of gold, silver, bronze, and earthen pots, eight Khattiya families, eight families of ministers-thus eight of everything (necessary for consecration)"

=== Standards ===
Flag of King Dutugamunu (161 BC-137 BC)

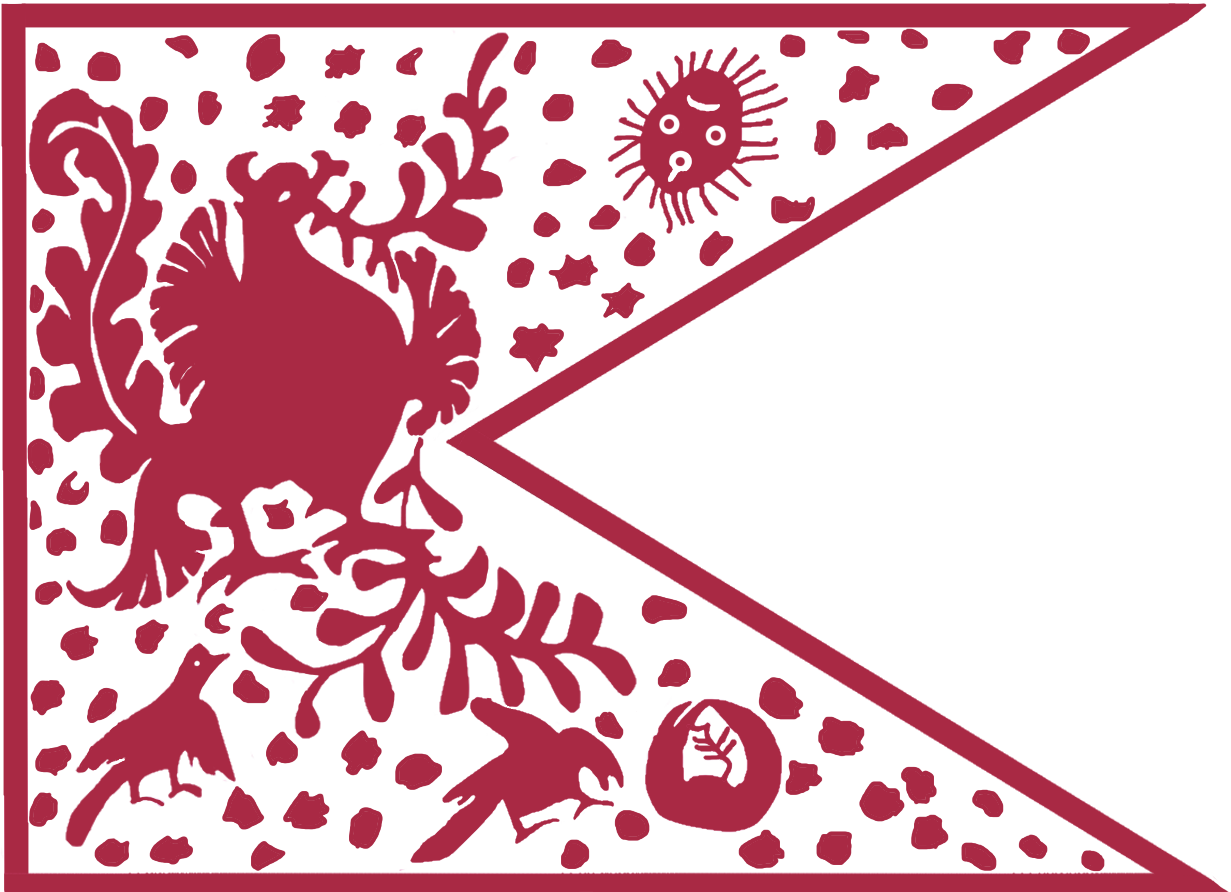
Royal Standard of Mahasena of Anuradhapura (273-301)

Flag of Kotte (1412–1597)

Royal Standard of Rajasinha I (which was also the flag of the Sitawaka kingdom)

Royal Standard of Sri Vikrama Rajasinha of the Kingdom of Kandy (1798–1815)
