= Mudiyanse =

Sinhala honorific title

Mudiyanse (Sinhala: මුදියන්සේ) is a Sinhala honorific title that originated in the 17th century. It is derived from the Tamil word Mudali, which comes from the root Muthal, meaning "first" or "chief." Over time, the Tamil term Mudali was combined with the Sinhala honorific Wahanse (Sinhala: වහන්සේ), which is used to convey respect. The combination of Mudali and Wahanse evolved into Mudiyan + Nehe, and eventually became Mudiyanse.

Historically, Mudiyanse was employed as a respectful title in administrative and social contexts, particularly during the Kandyan and early colonial periods, and was often associated with officers and local functionaries. It signified rank, authority, or esteem within local hierarchies rather than a hereditary designation. The title does not denote or correspond to any specific caste classification, but instead functioned as a general honorific applied across several social groups.

== Etymology and Tamil Origin of the Title Mudiyanse ==
The title Mudiyanse is derived from the Tamil Muthal (meaning "first") and yaar (denoting people), forming Mudaliar, meaning "headman" or "person of first rank." It was historically given to high ranking officers, administrators, and military leaders during the Imperial Chola Empire. The title was borne by communities like the Senguntha Kaikolar, Kondaikatti Vellalar, and Thuluva Vellalar, who served as ministers, soldiers, and commanders.The transition from Mudali to Mudiyanse highlights the historical and cultural connections between the Tamil and Sinhala communities.

== Historical Context ==
During the mid-17th century in the Kandyan Kingdom, the title Mudiyanse was conferred upon individuals by the King through the ceremonial act of tying a silk strip, embroidered with gold and silver, around their heads. This title was usually granted to select individuals, often from the Govigama caste, as a mark of honor. Within the Govigama caste, the respectable "middle" ranks were referred to as Räṭē Ättō, who were considered trusted gentlemen of the community. These individuals were often addressed with the respectful title Händuruvō (vocative: Händuruvānse), frequently followed by the suffix Appu (or Appuhamy), indicating respect for those of slightly higher status.The title Mudiyanse was comparable to the concept of "Knighthood" in English, as it signified an elevation in status. Those conferred with the title typically wore a ceremonial headband and enjoyed various privileges within the community.

Unlike hereditary titles, Mudiyanse was not passed down through generations.Importantly, although often associated with individuals from groups such as the Govigama, the title itself was not tied to or indicative of any specific caste.The title did not correspond to a fixed caste classification; rather, it served as a general honorific among various social groups.

However, by the later Kandyan period, the title had lost some of its original prestige, according to Robert Knox, and became more vulgarized, though it remained in use.

In An Historical Relation of the Island Ceylon (1681), Robert Knox describes the prestigious title "Mudiansē" conferred by the Kandyan king, emphasizing its extreme rarity. On page 67, he writes:

Among the Noblemen may be mentioned an Honour, that the King confers, like unto Knighthood; it ceaseth in the Person’s death, and is not Hereditary. The King confers it by putting about their Heads a piece of Silk or Ribbon embroidered with Gold and Silver, and bestowing a Title upon them. They are styled Mundianna. There are not above two or three of them now in the Realm living.

— Robert Knox, An Historical Relation of the Island Ceylon (1681), p. 67

== Decline in Prestige and Widespread Usage ==
Over time, the title Mudiyanse became more commonly used, as it was adopted by many individuals outside the traditional ranks for which it was originally intended. What began as a prestigious title conferred by the King on select members of society eventually became widespread among the general populace. According to Robert Knox, by the later Kandyan period, the term had lost its former prestige and became vulgarized, though it remained in use. Despite this dilution of status, Mudiyanse continued to be used widely as a mark of respect, although its social significance diminished compared to its original standing in the 17th century.

== Other uses of Mudiyanse ==
Over time, the title Mudiyanse began to appear in different ways outside its original royal context:

- Personal names and surnames: Among Kandyan Sinhalese, Mudiyanse became part of personal or family names. Examples include names like Tikiri Mudiyanse and Loku Mudiyanse.
- Local leadership titles: In villages, Mudiyanse was sometimes used informally to refer to headmen or respected community members, even if they were not officially given the title by the king.
- Ge names: Mudiyanselage is a common ge name used by people from the Sinhalese Govigama caste. However, this name is also used by some Muslim families in Kandyan areas, as well as by certain low-country Sinhalese families not belonging to the Govigama caste; this ge name was not, in any period, used to denote or correspond to any specific caste classification.

== See also ==
- Govigama
- Radala
- Appuhami
- Sinhalese people
