= Maha Dissava =

Sri Lankan title

Mahâ Dissâvas of Kingdom of Kandy

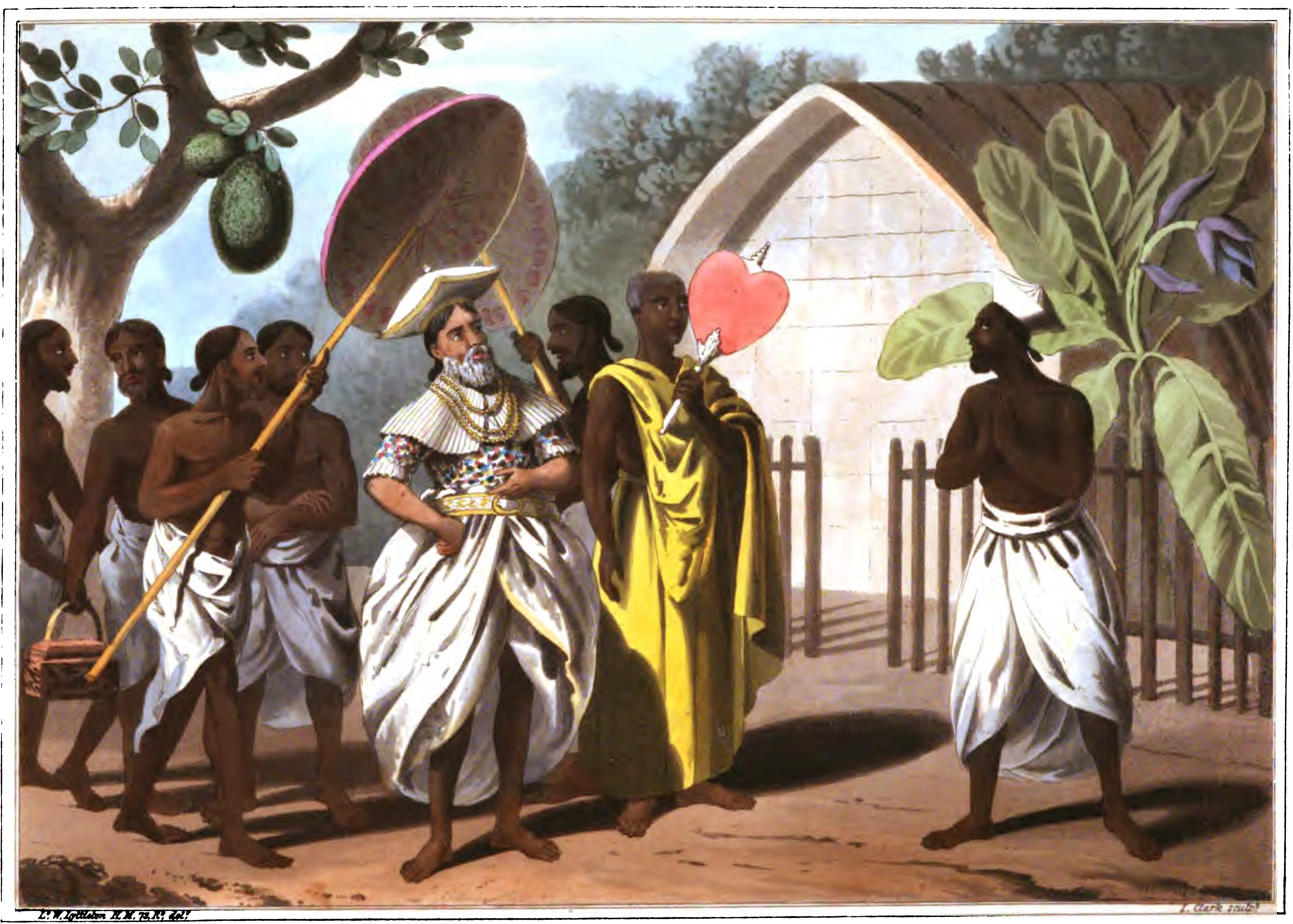
- A Kandyan Maha Dissava and a Buddhist monk in the early 19th century.
- Member of: Amātya Mandalaya
- Reports to: The Monarch
- Appointer: The Monarch

Monarchical Sri Lanka
- Part of a series on the politics and government of the Sinhala kingdom

Royal Court
- Monarch: King
- Queen consort: Randolis
- Sub king / Heir apparent: Yuvaraja
- Other queens: Rididoli
- Wife or Concubinage: Yakadadoli

Amātya Mandalaya (Council of State)
- 1st Prime Minister: Pallegampahê Adikâram Mahatmayâ
- 2nd Prime Minister: Udagampahê Adikâram Mahatmayâ
- 3rd Prime Minister: Siyapattuwa Adikâram Mahatmayâ
- Chief Secretary: Mahâ Mohottâla
- Provincial Governors: Mahâ Dissâvas
- Royal Household Officers: Dugganna Nilamês
- Sons of Chiefs: Bandâras

The Mahâ Dissâvas was a high-ranking office in the Amātya Mandalaya, or Sinhalese Council of State, in the Sinhalese Kingdoms of monarchical Sri Lanka. Like many of the existing high offices at the time, it had combined legislative and judicial powers and functioned primarily equivalent to that of a Provincial governor. The office of Dissava was retained under the successive European colonial powers, namely the Portuguese Empire, the Dutch East India Company and the British Empire. A Dissava was the governor of a province known as a Disavanies. Within his province, the Dissava held both executive and judicial authority.

== History ==
=== Kandyan kingdom ===
Persons were appointed to the title and office by the King during the Kingdom of Kandy. Such an appointee headed the administration of a large province of the kingdom known as a Disavanies and was the king's personal representative, tax collector in that area. There were twenty one provinces of which twelve of the larger outlying provinces where Dissava were appointed. There was no time limit for the officer holder as he held the post at the pleasure of the King, which meant throughout his life, if he did not incur the displeasure of the King. The office was not hereditary, although members of the same family have been appointed.

As king's personal representative in a province they held much power, controlled the civil administration, taxation, judicial, law enforcement and military matters of the province. Many close relatives of the King being commonly appointed. They received a portion of the taxation as pay and also large land grants from the King, some being hereditary. Along with Maha Adigars and a few others high officials of the kingdom they made up the Radala caste, who were referred to as the Chieftains of Kandy by the British. Many were instrumental in the surrender of the Kandyan Kingdom to the British and were signatories to the Kandyan Convention in 1815.

Ten Dissavas of the Kandyan Kingdom

- Dissava of Wellassa & Bintenna
- Dissava of Matale
- Dissava of Uda-Palatha
- Dissava of Nuwara Kalawiya
- Dissava of Sath Korles
- Dissava of Thun Korles
- Dissava of Sabaragamuwa
- Dissava of Hathra Korles
- Dissava of Uva
- Dissava of Tamankaduwa

=== Colonial Sri Lanka ===
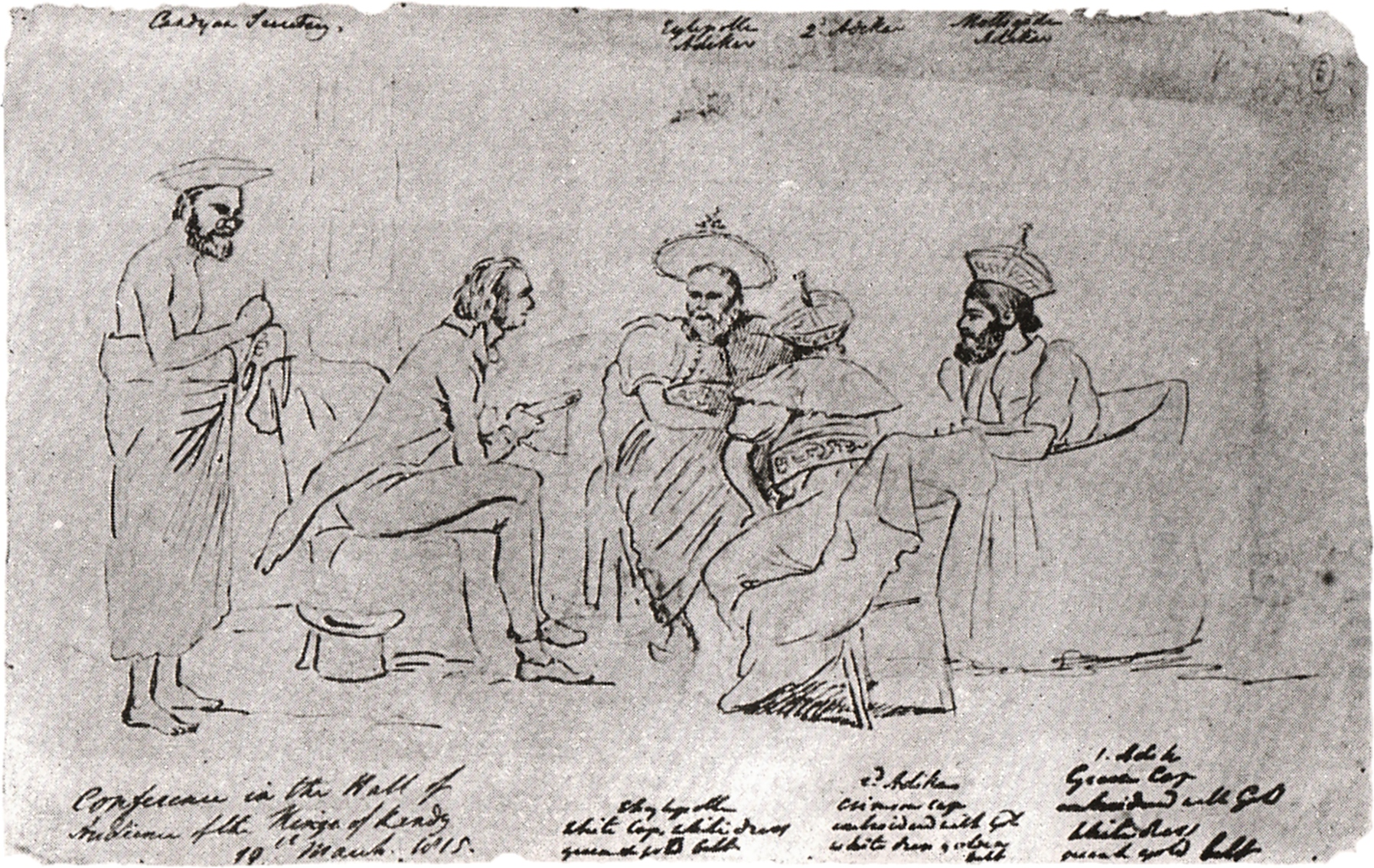
Dissavas of the Kandyan Kingdom, Ehelepola, Molligoda and Kapuvatta with D'Oyly

The Portuguese continued the administrative units of Disavanis, which existed in the territories the Portuguese gained from former Sinhalese kingdoms. During the Portuguese rule there were four such disavanis. The civil, military and judicial administration of these units were carried out by a Dissava appointed by the Portuguese Captain General in keeping with the tradition of the land. The Dissava led the Lascarins which was the local militia in time of war. Initially both Sinhalese and Portuguese were appointed to this post, thereafter Portuguese were preferred. He was assisted in military functions by Mudaliyars, Muhandirams and Arachchis. In judicial functions he was assisted by Basnayakas and Mohottalas. Each Disavanis was divided into sub units called Korales. These were presided by a Korale Vidana, who was a magistrate and revenue collector.

The Dutch continued the system of administration of the Portuguese, but gradually reduced the power of the local headmen. The Dissavas were members of the Political Council of the Commendary the locality they belong to. Following the expansion of British rule into the provinces of the former Kandyan Kingdom in 1815, the British retained the office of Dissava reporting to a board consisting of the British Resident in Kandy and two assistants.

Following the Uva Rebellion in 1818 and changers to the administrative divisions of the island with the creation of Districts, British Government Agents took over the duties of the Dissava, with the remaining and newly appointed Dissavas being mere honorary titles appointing Kandyans loyal to the British Crown as honors. After Ceylon suspended honours in 1956, these appointments were never made.

== Notable appointees ==
- Molligoda Maha Adigar – Signatory to the Kandyan Convention, 1st (Maha) Adikar & Dissawa of the Sath (Seven) Korles
- Keppetipola Disawe – Leader of the Uva Rebellion of 1818
- Lewke Disawa – Disawe of Sathara korale
- Galagoda Disawe
- P.B. Bulankulame Dissava – Ceylonese Cabinet Minister
- Barnes Ratwatte Dissawe Successor of S.D.N.Mahawalatenne Disawe – Rate Mahatmaya of Balangoda
- Harris Leuke Ratwatte Dissawe – Politician
- T. B. Poholiyadde Dissawe – Politician
- Molagoda Dissawe
- Wattarantenne Nilame Dewamedde Maha Dissawe of the 7 Korales
- Wattarantenne Nilame Walapane Maha Dissawe 1819
- Wattarantenne Rajapaksa Mudiyanselage Kiri Banda Nugegoda – Dissawe Lekama Harispattu (1924) grand son of Wattarantenne Maha Dissawe

== See also ==
- Radala
- Sri Lankan titles
- Provincial Governors of Sri Lanka
