= Maha Adigar =

Great Officer in the Amātya Mandalaya, Sinhalese Kingdom, Sri Lanka

Mahâ Adigâr of the Kingdom of Kandy

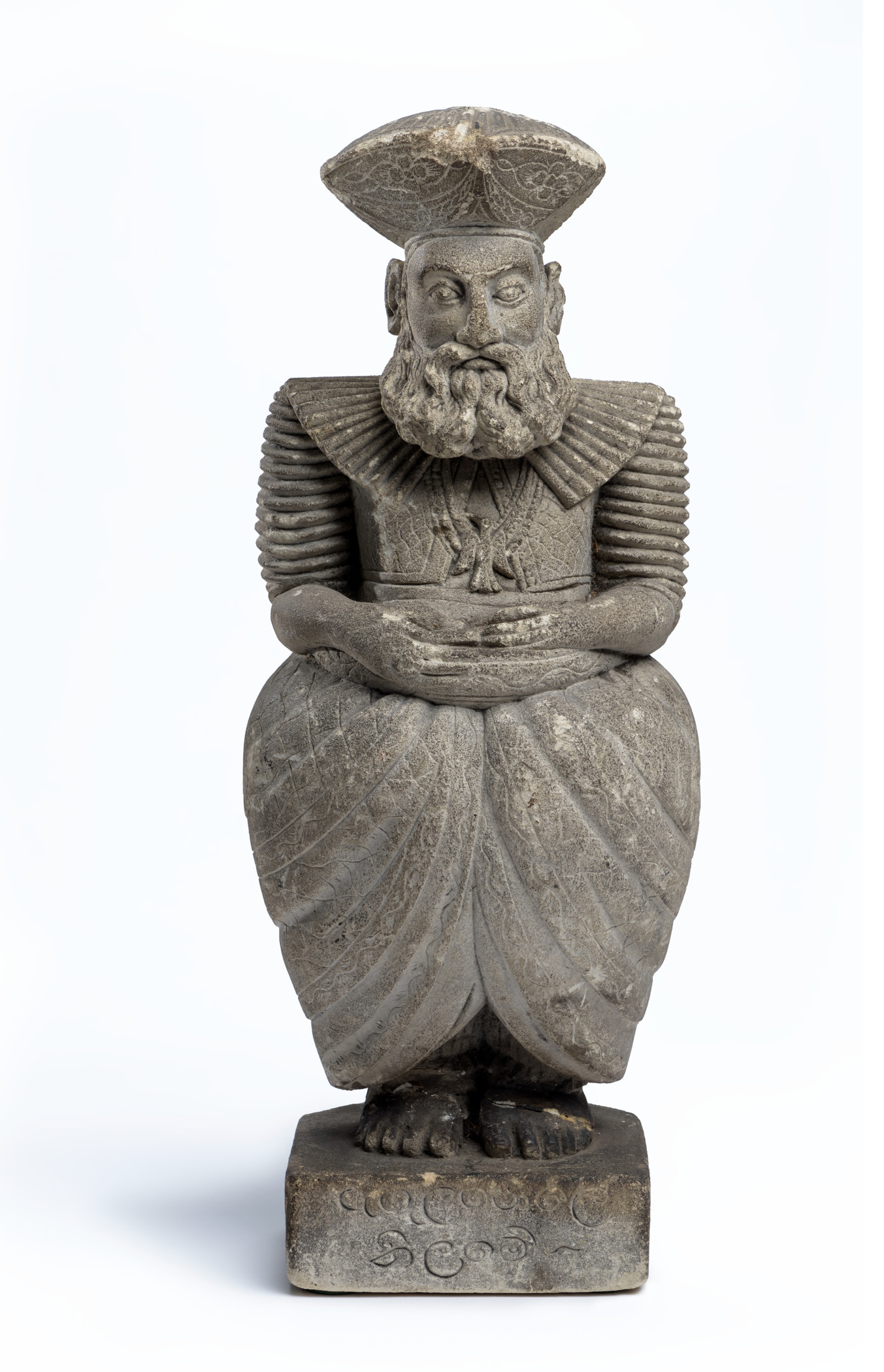
- Maha Adigar Ehelepola Nilame (1811-1814)
- Style: Mahâ Nilamé
- Member of: Amātya Mandalaya
- Reports to: The Monarch
- Seat: Kandy
- Appointer: The Monarch
- Term length: At His Majesty's pleasure
- Formation: Pallegampahê (Unknown); Udagampahê (~1638); Siyapattuwa (~1811)
- Final holder: Tikiri Bandara Panabokke II (titular)
- Abolished: 1963

Monarchical Sri Lanka
- Part of a series on the politics and government of the Sinhala kingdom

Royal Court
- Monarch: King
- Queen consort: Randolis
- Sub king / Heir apparent: Yuvaraja
- Other queens: Rididoli
- Wife or Concubinage: Yakadadoli

Amātya Mandalaya (Council of State)
- 1st Prime Minister: Pallegampahê Adikâram Mahatmayâ
- 2nd Prime Minister: Udagampahê Adikâram Mahatmayâ
- 3rd Prime Minister: Siyapattuwa Adikâram Mahatmayâ
- Chief Secretary: Mahâ Mohottâla
- Provincial Governors: Mahâ Dissâvas
- Royal Household Officers: Dugganna Nilamês
- Sons of Chiefs: Bandâras

The Mahâ Adigâr (Sinhala: මහා අධිකාරම්) (also known as Adikārama, Adikār) was a Great Officer in the Amātya Mandalaya, or Sinhalese Council of State, in the Sinhalese Kingdoms of monarchical Sri Lanka. The office was second in power and dignity to the King. Like many of the existing high offices at the time it had combined legislative and judicial powers and functioned primarily equivalent to that of a prime minister and chief justice, but also had duties in the governance of a province. During the Kandyan period there were two Adigars, who were styled Mahâ Nilames (Grand Officers), the Pallegampahê Mahâ Nilamê and the Udagampahê Mahâ Nilamê, the former taking precedence over the latter.

== History ==
The constitution and laws derived by the earlier kings of Anuradhapura, Polonnaruwa and Dambadeniya guided the later kings of Kotte and Kandy in accordance with the Lex non scripta of the country. In most instances it is believed that these customary laws, dating from remote antiquity, to have been originated from the ancient written laws of which no records have remained. No regular records remain owing, in all probability, to the wanton destruction of literary records and libraries during the several invasions from the continent of India. One most devastating example committed by the Cholas at the beginning of the thirteenth century where the island suffered irreparable losses both from a literary and political point of view, due to the furious destruction of the invaders.

In the Sinhalese Kingdom the Monarch was the absolute ruler, however the monarch was assisted in the exercise of the functions of government by the Amātya Mandalaya which was headed by the Mahâ Adigârs, a position equivalent to that of a prime minister. Originally there were four Adigars, by the time of Rajasinha II (1635-1687) they had been gradually reduced to one. Rajasinha II is said to have reappointed the second, and the last king of Kandy Sri Vikrama Rajasinha (1798-1815) added a third. By the Kandyan period there existed two Adigars who were styled Mahâ Nilames (Grand Officers), the Pallegampahê Mahâ Nilamê and the Udagampahê Mahâ Nilamê, the former taking precedence over the latter, though remaining equal in power. These names were derived from the districts under the Rājākariya, where services due from the inhabitants of these areas having been given to the two Adigârs.

Following the expansion of British rule into the provinces of the former Kandyan Kingdom, since 1815 the British retained the office of Adigar appointing Kandyans loyal to the British Crown. Although the office remained a powerful one till the late 19th century, it soon became an honorary post and title. The last to hold the title was Sir Tikiri Bandara Panabokke, who was appointed to the honorary post of First Adigar in 1940. After his death in 1963 no appointments were made.

== Functions ==
The Mahâ Adigâr was second in power and dignity to the monarch, and there was usually two in number who possessed equal powers. Like many of the other high offices in the country the Mahâ Adigâr had combined legislative and judicial powers. They acted as judges to the Wahal Habe (the King's Court) and also had the command of the guards called Katupulle, and would act as chief of the military and on field commanders during military campaigns.

Though the office was very powerful, his emoluments and influence was less than that of a Mahâ Dissâva, a provincial governor, so the government of a province was added to his office of Adigâr. Being Prime Minister also, the Adigâr would reside in the city which was the seat of government, however according to Kandyan law his wife and children would be taken as hostage for his good conduct, during his absence, whenever he visited the provinces over which he was Dissava.

The Adigâr signed all land grants made by the King and appointed junior officers.

=== Tenure ===
There was no time limit for the office holder as he held the post at the pleasure of the King, which meant throughout his life, if not incurred the displeasure of the King. It was not hereditary, although members of the same family have been appointed.

=== Wealth ===
With his appointment into office the Adigar would have to pay the king, his appointee, five hundred "Silver Coins", and a similar sum every new year (dakum). However he would in turn receive large sums of money through junior officers he has appointed receiving around 10 silver coins per year from them. The Adigar further received a portion of fines collected, income from ferries operated, and from liberated prisoners.

== List of Maha Adigars ==
Maha Adigar Pilimatalavuva

=== During the regin of Vimaladharmasuriya I (1592-1604) ===
Mahâ Adigâr
Portrait	Name (Birth–Death)	Tenure
	Emmannual Dias (died ?)	1594-1602

=== During the regin of Senarat (1604-1635) ===
Mahâ Adigâr
Portrait	Name (Birth–Death)	Tenure
	Weerasuriya (Note: Weerasuriya was a brother in law of Senarat) & Yalegoda (Note: Yalegoda a relative of Senarat) (died ?) & (died ?)	1602-1635

=== During the regin of Rajasinha II (1635-1687) ===
Pallegampahê Adikâram Mahatmayâ			Udagampahê Adikâram Mahatmayâ		
Portrait	Name (Birth–Death)	Tenure	Portrait	Name (Birth–Death)	Tenure
Office vacant from 1635 to 1638
	Hindagala & Arave (died 1634) & (died ?)	1638-1650		de Gascogne I (died 1670)	1638-1670
	Angammana (died ?)	1650-1680			
	Rammolaka (died ?)	1681-1707			
	Aswolle & Divakara (died ?)	1687			

=== During the regin of Vimaladharmasuriya II (1687-1707) ===
Pallegampahê Adikâram Mahatmayâ			Udagampahê Adikâram Mahatmayâ		
Portrait	Name (Birth–Death)	Tenure	Portrait	Name (Birth–Death)	Tenure
Office vacant from 1687 to 1693
	Yalegoda (died ?)	1693-1696(at least 1703)			
	Peddigue (died ?)	-1697			
	Beminiwatte (died ?)	1702			
	Ehelepola I (died 1717)	1706-1707 (1717)			

=== During the regin of Vira Narendra Sinha (1707-1739) ===
Pallegampahê Adikâram Mahatmayâ

- Ehelepola I 1706-d. 1717
- Pedro de Gascogne (Note: Also known as Daskon) 1709-1715
- Rammolaka II 1717-d. 1734
- Dondanvela ~1734-1737
- Ehelepola II (b. ~1717-d .1759) 1737-d. 1759

Udagampahê Adikâram Mahatmayâ

- Rammolaka II 1707-1717
- Mampitiye Hulangomuv 1723-1732
- Hulamgemuve 1733-?
- Angammana 1734-1739
- Pilimatalavuva Arava Tikiribandara (1738–1762)

=== During the regin of Sri Vijaya Rajasinha (1739-1747) ===
Pallegampahê Adikâram Mahatmayâ

Udagampahê Adikâram Mahatmayâ

- Pilimatalave I 1742-1766 2nd
- Ratwatte Disava 1825-1829 2nd

=== During the regin of Kirti Sri Rajasinha (1747-1782) ===
Pallegampahê Adikâram Mahatmayâ

- Ellepola Samarakodi 1752-1760
- Galagoda 1760-1777
- Pilimatalave I 1761-?
- Pilimatalavuva Arava Tikiribandara (1765–1773)
- Angammana 1766-1777
- Pilimatalave II 1776-1781 or 1778-1784
- Pilimatalavuva Vijesundara Mudiyanse (1778–1789)

Udagampahê Adikâram Mahatmayâ

- Pilimatalave IV 1760-?
- Pilimatalavuva Vijesundara Mudiyanse (1773–1778)

=== During the regin of Sri Rajadhi Rajasinha (1782-1798) ===
Pallegampahê Adikâram Mahatmayâ

- Angammana 1782-1790
- Migastenne/Dumbara I 1789-?
- Pilimatalave III (1792–1811)

Udagampahê Adikâram Mahatmayâ

- Dodanvala 1782-1790
- Erewawala 1783-d. 1798
- Migastenne/Dumbara I 1786/7-1789
- Migastenne/Dumbara II 1797-?
- Pilimatalavuva (1787–1790)

=== During the regin of Sri Vikrama Rajasinha (1798-1815) ===
Pallegampahê Adikâram Mahatmayâ

- Migastenne/Dumbara II 1800-d. 1806
- Ehelepola III 1802
- Ehelepola III 1811–1814 - Instrumental in the demise of the Kingdom of Kandy
- Molligoda Senior (1814–1823) - Singularity to the Kandyan Convention, Dissawa of the Satkorale

Udagampahê Adikâram Mahatmayâ

- Pilimatalavuva Vijesumdara Rajakaruna Navaratna Attanayake Bandaranayaka Mudiyanse Ralahamy (1805–14, 1815–18)
- Ehelepola III (1808–1811) - Instrumental in the demise of the Kingdom of Kandy
- Molligoda Senior (1811–1814) - Singularity to the Kandyan Convention, Dissawa of the Satkorale
- Unambuwe 1811-?
- Kapuwatta 1814-1836

Siyapattuwa Adikâram Mahatmayâ

- Dullewe 1811-

=== Titular (1815-1963) ===
Pallegampahê Adikâram Mahatmayâ

- Molligoda Rajakaruna Seneviratna Abeykoon Herath Wahala Mudiyanse
- Molligoda Junior 1823-1835
- Mahawalatenna 1836-?
- Dullewa 1887-d. 1904
- S. N. W. Hulugalle Adigar (1905–1915) - member of the Legislative Council of Ceylon
- J. H. Meedeniya 1920-1931? - member of the Legislative Council of Ceylon
- Tikiri Bandara Panabokke II 1940-1963 - member of the Legislative Council, first Minister of Health in the State Council and second representative of the Government of Ceylon to India

Udagampahê Adikâram Mahatmayâ

- Molligoda Rajakaruna Seneviratna Herath Wahala Mudiyanse
- Ratwatte Nilame (1825–1827) - Dissawa of Matale and signatory of the Kandyan Convention
- Dullewa 1828-1849
- Ratwatta 1824-1827
- Molligoda Junior 1819-1823

Siyapattuwa Adikâram Mahatmayâ

- Ellapola 1815-1818?
- Mullegama 1836-?
- Sir Cuda Ratwatte - first elected Mayor of Kandy and member of the State Council of Ceylon
- Meegasthenna Maha
- J. C. Ratwatte - member of the State Council
- Lawrence Nugawela - Rate Mahatmaya of Katugampola Hatpattu in Kurunegala District, was honored with the rank of Disawa and was awarded the rank of Second Adigar on his retirement from Government Service

== See also ==
- Radala
- Sri Lankan titles
