= Sinhala (monarch) =

- Born: Jambudvīpa
- Died: Sinhala
- Dynasty: Sinhalese monarchy
- Father: Sinha

Sinhala was a legendary king mentioned in Divyavadana, the Valahassa Jataka, and by Xuanzang. According to the legend, he was a merchant who led an expedition to the island of modern-day Sri Lanka and later founded the Sinhalese Kingdom, which gained its name from him. According to the Divyavadana, Sinhala was also a Bodhisattva, a past life of Gautama Buddha but in the Valahassa Jataka, the Bodhisattva is the horse that saves him.

== Significance ==
Sri Lankan historian Senarath Paranavithana suggests, based on the legend, that immigrants into the island were not led by a scion of a royal house but various adventurous and pioneering merchants exploring new lands that came in different streams.
