= Ehelepola Nilame =

Courtier of the Kingdom of Kandy

Ehelepola Nilame ඇහැලේපොළ නිලමේ
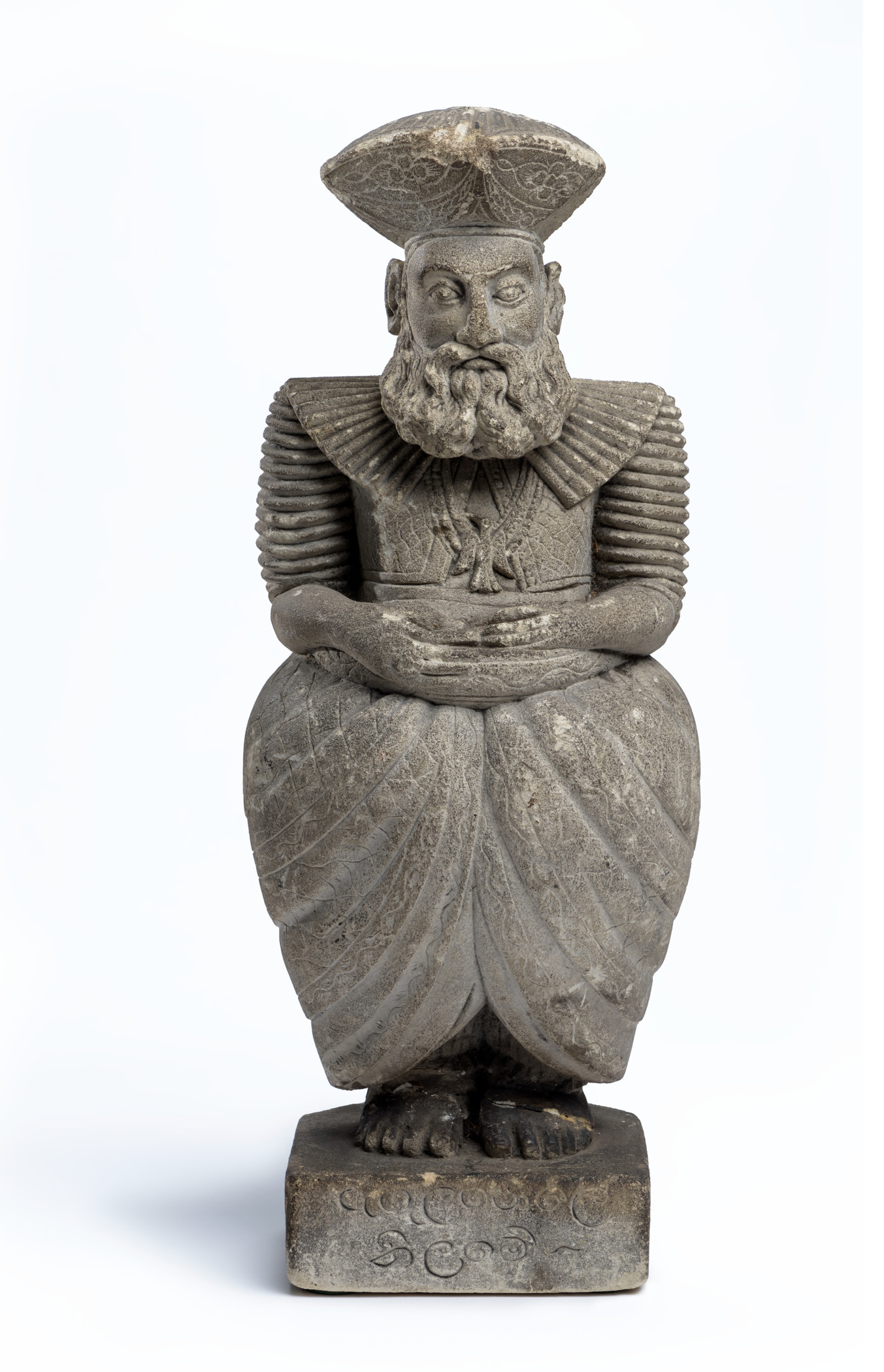

First Adigar
- In office 1811–1814
- Preceded by: Pilimathalawe III
- Succeeded by: Molligoda

Second Adigar
- In office 1808–1811
- Preceded by: Megastenne
- Succeeded by: Molligoda

Personal details
- Born: 1773 Kingdom of Kandy
- Died: 1829 (aged 55–56) Mauritius
- Spouse: Ehelepola Kumarihami
- Children: Ehelepola Loku Bandara; Ehelepola Madduma Bandara; Ehelepola Tikiri Manike; Ehelepola Dingiri Menike
- Parents: Mudiyanse Adikaram (father); Pilimatalawe Kumarihami (mother)
- Education: Yatawatte Pirivena
- Occupation: Civil servant

Ehelapola Wijesundara Wickramasinghe Chandrasekara Seneviratna Jayatillake Ekanayaka Amarakoon Wahala Panditha Mudiyanse (Sinhala: ඇහැලේපොල විජයසුන්දර වික්‍රමසිංහ චන්ද්‍රසේකර සෙනෙවිරත්න ජයතිලක ඒකනායක අමරකෝන් වාහල පණ්‌ඩිත මුදියන්සේ; 1773–1829), commonly known as Ehelapola Nilame (Sinhala: ඇහැලේපොළ නිලමේ), was a courtier of the Kingdom of Kandy. He was the Pallegampahe Adigar, and held the honorary title of Maha Nilame from 1811 to 1814 under the reign of Sri Vikrama Rajasinha of Kandy. Ehelapola joined a revolt against King Rajasinha in Sabaragamuva province after he was sent to conquer it, and his entire family was executed. He helped the British launch an invasion against the Kandy Kingdom, overthrow Rajasinha, and subjugate Kandy to the British monarchy under the Kandyan Convention. Various records of Sri Lankan history suggest that he aided the British with the plan to later overthrow them. He was later convicted of treason by the British following the Great Rebellion of 1817–18, and was exiled to Mauritius.

== Early life ==
He was born to a Radala family of courtiers who came from the village of Ehelepola, and was educated by the chief priest, Yatawatte, before joining the royal court as part of the royal household. He was the son of a chieftain named Wijayasundere Wickremasinghe Chandrasekere Seneviratne Senanayake Jayatillake Ekanayaka Amarakoon Rajapakse Wahala Pandita Mudiyanse Adikaram and Pilimatalawe Kumarihami, sister of Pilimatalawe Pallegampaha Adikaram. His grandfather was awarded the position of Mohottala of the Dadimunda Shrine, Aluthnuwara by King Kirti Sri Rajasinghe and was the youngest out of four brothers who belonged to the family of Madawla Kulatunga, a Kandyan Radala family who had been chieftains of the Uva Province for centuries. The second eldest of the four brothers was Weliwita Sri Saranankara Thero, the last Sangharaja of Sri Lanka.

== Royal service ==
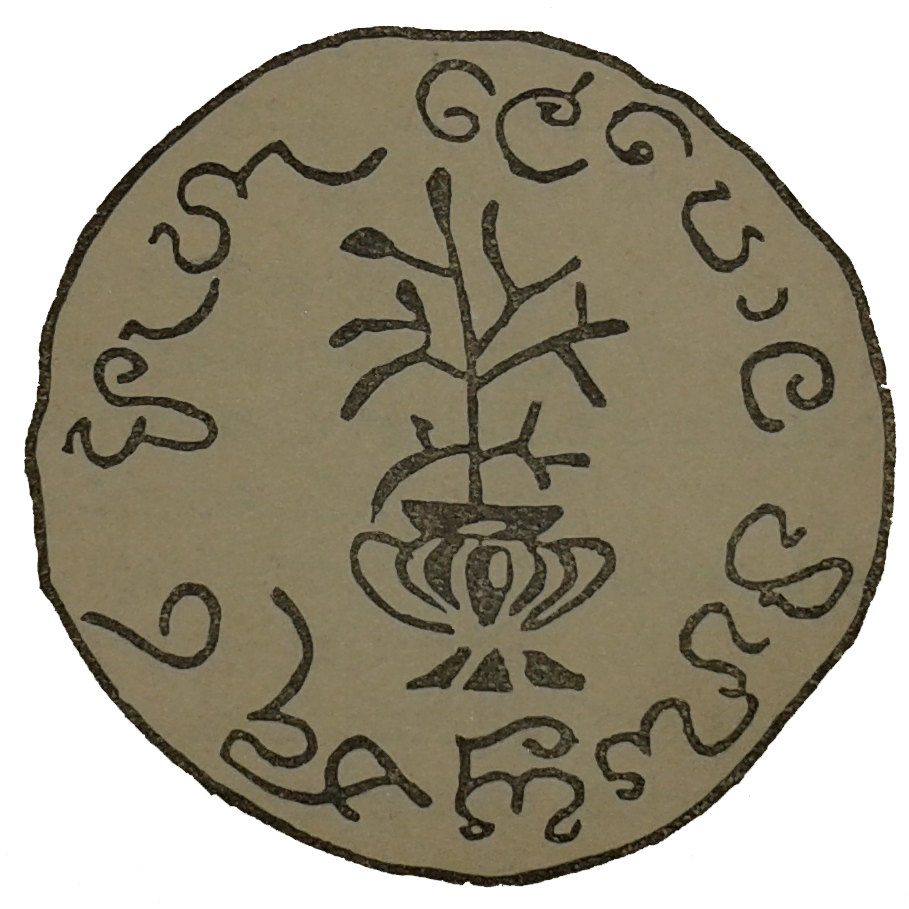
Seal of Maha Nilame

Ehelepola's first appointment was to the post of Paniwidakara Nilame by the king, and was later appointed Udagampahe Adigar in 1808 succeeding Megastenne on his death. Ehelepola was appointed Maha Dissava of Sabaragamuva. Sath Korale, which was also held by Megastenne was divided between Molligoda and Ehelepola which was unprecedented and caused much unrest amongst the populaces and resulted in riots in 1811, which had to be put down by Pilimatalawwe Nilame, the Udagampahe Adigar and Ehelepola's uncle. It also led to much animosity between Molligoda and Ehelepola. In 1811, Pilimatalawwe was beheaded after he was convicted of high treason for attempting to remove the King and replace him with the young Prince Kannasamy. Ehelepola was thereafter appointed as Maha Adigaram in 1811. The king became increasingly suspicious of his chiefs and courtiers. His suppression of his repressive enemies was brutal and soon the king became unpopular among his chiefs and people.

== Rebellion ==
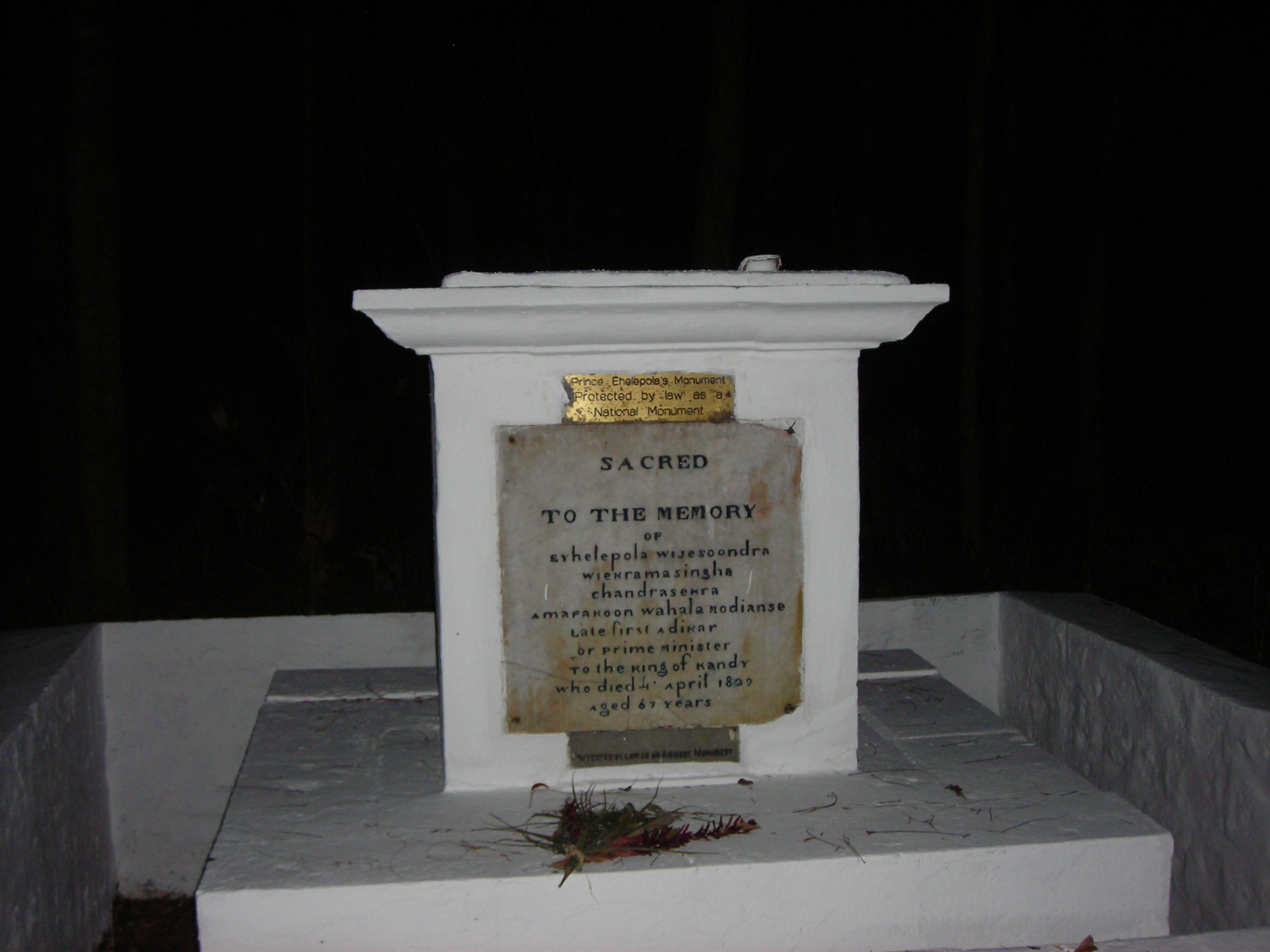
Ehelepola Nilame's Monument in Mauritius.

The king fell out of favor with the Ehelepola and when a revolt broke out in Sabaragamuva, Ehelepola was sent to suppress it. When Ehelepola failed to return on the king's summons, Molligoda was dispatched to capture and return with Ehelepola. Following an engagement with Molligoda's men, Ehelepola went to the coastal areas of the island to gain support to overthrow the king.

Molligoda returned to Kandy with 47 chiefs of Sabaragamuwa as prisoners, who were executed in a day followed by the brutal execution of Ehelepola's family. After these executions, the king lost popular support and riots broke out in response. As a result, the king fled to Hanguranketha. Ehelepola joined the British forces with the plan to overthrow the British after the capture of Kandy in January 1815.

The Kandyan Convention was shortly signed on March 2 recognizing the British monarchy. Following this convention, Sri Vikrama Rajasinha was captured and exiled to India.

== Later life and death ==
After the capture of Kandy by the British, Ehelepola was banned from various activities, such as riding his white horse in public, to prevent the people of Ceylon from viewing him as the possible king of Kandy.

Prior to the Great Rebellion of 1817–18, Ehelepola’s plan to retake island after the capture of the Kandy was halted by the British administration; he was arrested by the British and exiled to Mauritius along with several Kandyan chiefs without any cause. He died there in 1829 from cholera.
