= Vira Narendra Sinha =

King of Kandy from 1707 to 1739

Sri Veera Parakrama Narendrasinha ශ්‍රී වීර පරාක්‍රම නරේන්ද්‍රසිංහ
- Thrisinhaladheeshwara; Lankeshwara; Bhupathi

King of Kandy
- Reign: 4 June 1707 – 13 May 1739
- Coronation: 1707
- Predecessor: Vimaladharmasuriya II
- Successor: Sri Vijaya Rajasinha
- Born: 1690; Sri Lanka
- Died: 13 May 1739 (aged 48–49); Sri Lanka
- Burial: Royal Cremation Yard, Asgiri Temple, Kandy, Sri Lanka
- Spouse: Queen Consort; Pramila Devi Royal Consort; Udumale Devi Royal Concubine; Monaravila Devi
- Issue: Prince Unambuwe Bandara and other sons from Yakadadolis
- Father: Vimaladharmasurya II
- Mother: Madurai Queen Consort of Vimaladharmasuriya II: adopted mother; Muthukuda Devi (Royal Concubine / Yakada Doli) - Biological mother
- Religion: Theravada Buddhism

Sri Veera Parakrama Narendrasinha (Sinhala:ශ්‍රී වීර පරාක්‍රම නරේන්ද්‍රසිංහ; 1707–1739 AD) was the last Sinhalese King of Sri Lanka of the Kingdom of Kandy. He was also known as the "Prince of Kundasale".

== Childhood ==
Narendrasinghe was the successor of his father Vimaladharmasurya II. His mother was a Royal Concubine called Muthukude Devi, who was from a local noble family. According to historical sources his father's other wives became jealous of him. So they conspired to kill him and his mother while they sailed across the Mahawali river at Lewella ferry by drawing. But a young man was going nearby saved both of them.

After this incident King Vimaladharmasuriya II kept his beloved son at Kundasale Palace for safety. Because of this he was called as Prince Kundasale.

Prince Kundasale was a playful boy in his young ages.

== Ascension to the throne ==
Prince Kundasale was adopted by his father's Queen Consort to offer him the legal inheritance for the throne. When he was enthroned few members of the Royal Court disagreed and they tried to give the throne to Prince Pattiya Bandara. As the result during his reign, the chiefs and nobles strengthened their authority. Once a conspiracy was planned by the Second Adigar Yalegoda and his follower chiefs of the court against the king and one of the old friends of the king, called Pedro Dascon alias Pirre de Gascogne, pioneered in protecting the king. In return, the king appointed him as the Second Adigar in 1709.

== Religion ==
Vira Parakrama Narendra Singha was believed to be a considerably pious monarch, and like his predecessor, he lived at peace with the Dutch invaders and devoted himself to the furtherance of literature and religion.

== Marriages ==
Narendra Singha had several marriages as mentioned in history. His Queen Consort was a princess from the Madurai Nayakkar dynasty. She was known as Pramila Devi, daughter of Lord Pitti Nayakkar and Lady Abhirami Devi. She was known to have had a secret affair with the king's close companion, the Second Adigar Dascon. After it was revealed to the public, Dascon's beheading was ordered by the king

Narendra Singha had a consort called Udumale Devi. Some historians say that it was an honourable name for the Queen Consort.

He married a daughter of Monaravila Disave of Matale. She was called as Monaravila Yakadadoli. He had two sons with her. The eldest was Prince Unambuwe Bandara and the second son died at a young age.

And also he married his maternal female cousin from Muthukude Walawwa and named her as a Royal Concubine (Yakadadoli).

The King married a local princess from Palle Walawwa of Kurukohogama named Heen Kumari, at his old age. But the princess had never wanted to marry the king, so she committed suicide inside her wedding chalet on the way to the palace.

The king had two principal harems at the Senkadagala Palace and the Haguranketha Palace.

== Succession ==
After the death of the king in 1739, the throne was succeeded by his wife's brother, Sri Vijaya Rajasinha, who was of Nayakkar nationality which originated from south India, as he had no brothers or sons from the queen consort. But he had children from his royal consort, such as prince Unambuwe Bandara, upon his death, the law from India which belonged to the Queen consort refused to appoint Unumbuwe Bandara as successors. After that, the throne of the Sinhalese kings ended and was passed on to Madurai Nayakkars till the Sri Lankan monarchy ended.

== In popular culture ==
- Portrayed by Akila Dhanuddhara in the 2015 EAP Broadcasting Company TV series Daskon.

== See also ==
- Mahavamsa
- List of monarchs of Sri Lanka
- History of Sri Lanka

== Sources ==
- Kings & Rulers of Sri Lanka

Vira Narendra Sinha Born: ? 1690 Died: May 13 1739
Regnal titles
Preceded by Vimaladharmasurya II	King of Kandy; 4 June 1707–13 May 1739	Succeeded by Sri Vijaya Rajasinha
