= Yakadadoli =

Yakadadoli were aristocratic concubines in the harem of the Kings of the Kingdom of Kandy in Sri Lanka. Kandyan Kings maintained harems, in addition to a chief queen and one or two secondary queens. The concubines in the harem, consisted of two categories, the Randoli who were concubines of royal blood and Yakadadoli who were primarily from the Radala caste. Children of both Randoli and Yakadadoli were disqualified from kingship. This was the case with Vira Narendra Sinha who had Sri Vijaya Rajasinha the brother of his queen succeed him as opposed to his sons from his Randoli. Favorite concubines frequently received land grants and their offspring were appointed as high officials of the royal court, and in a few cases captured kingdoms by deposing less scandalous and more legitimate heirs to the throne.

The daughter of the Bintenne Disawe and granddaughter of Mámpitiye Disawe was a Yakadadoli in the Harem of the Nayakkar King Kirti Sri Rajasinghe (AD 1747 - 1782), and had a very capable and popular son by the King, named Mámpitiya Bandára. However Mámpitiya Bandara was not considered as an heir to the throne on account of the king's brother's presence at court. Following South Indian succession traditions, Kirti Sri Rajasinghe overlooked this illegitimate son, and selected his brother, a Náyakkar prince, as the heir to the throne. The Yakadadoli however was again selected as a mistress of Kirti Sri Rajasinghe's successor Rajádhi Rajasinghe (A. D. 1782 - 1798).

As part of customary law, if someone sought refuge in the house of a Yakadadoli they could not be arrested.
