= Radala =

Sinhala aristocratic subcaste of the Govigamas

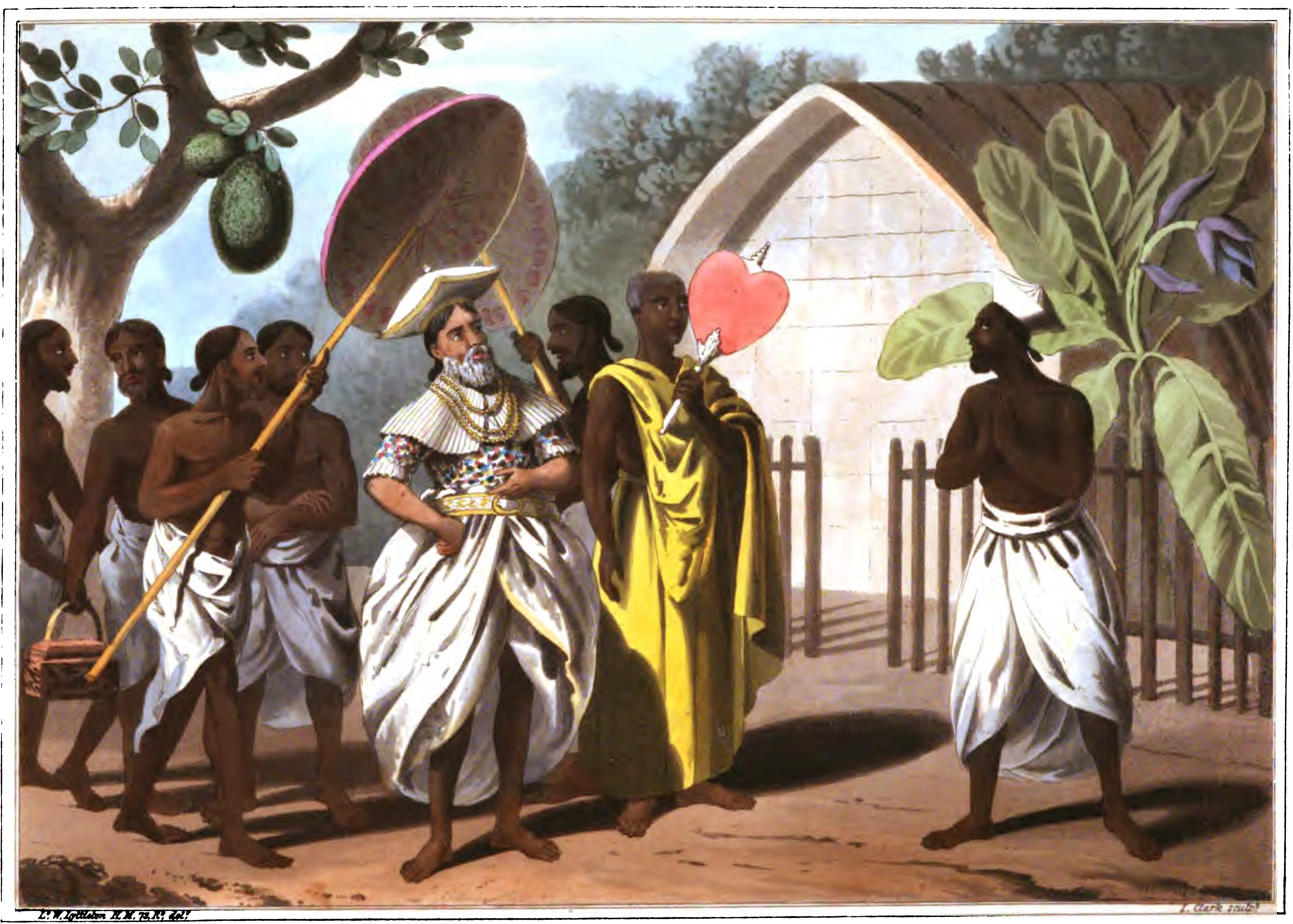
A Dissava and a Buddhist monk in 1821.

Radala refers to a small minority group in Sri Lanka in the former provinces of the Kingdom of Kandy, who are either descendants of chiefs and courtiers of the King of Kandy of Nayaks of Kandy or descendants of native headmen appointed by the British colonial administration following the Uva Rebellion in 1818.

Radalas often refer to themselves as the aristocracy of the Kingdom of Kandy and claim the term came into use following the throne of the Kingdom of Kandy went to the Nayak Dynasty, whose family members constituted the royalty of the kingdom. The British referred to this group as chiefs who held the high offices of state such as Adigar, Dissava and MahaLekam which appointments were not hereditary and these individuals could not ascend to the throne as the Nayak royalty could. This group of chiefs were instrumental in deposing the last king of Kandy, Sri Vikrama Rajasinha and signing the Kandyan Convention in 1815, which transferred the Kingdom of Kandy onto the British crown. John D'Oyly does not make any reference to a particular group called Radala in his writings. This group came to dominate national politics in the post-independence era, under the former Prime Minister Sirima Bandaranaike a direct descended of one of the signatories of the Kandyan Convention. True Kandyan Old Radala Family names (Before the British in 1815) include Dodanwala (Mahanuwara), Nugawela (Harispattuwa), Amunugama, Ratwatte, Aluwihare (Matale), Ehelepola (Matale), Weragama (Matale),Mampitiya (Udunuwara), Pilimatalawe (Yatinuwara), Dullewa (Matale), Dunuwila (Matale), Panabokke (Udunuwara) and Rambukwella (Dumbara)

== History ==
=== Kandyan Kingdom ===
A group of Kandyan Chiefs from Tennent's Ceylon, published in 1859.

The offspring of Kandyan Kings from concubines of non-royal blood of the harem known as Yakadadoli received appointments in court and in the provinces. This practice continued into the British period and was abhorred as a degrading form of ancient tyranny and abolished by the British in 1818 under the proclamation of 12 November 1818, by Governor Robert Brownrigg. Apart from having to continuously dress in full in the presence of the King, the Radalas did not have to rise from their seats like other commoners when the king's dirty linen was taken past them. They were permitted to use their own ancestral and military insignia, swords, umbrellas, and jewellery and wear shoes. Some Chiefs were merely personal attendants of the King. The Diyawadana Nilame was the King's personal valet responsible for bathing and dressing of the King.

The traditional Kandyan Radala of the past had considered themselves to be an exclusive caste and not part of the Govigama caste. Bryce Ryan observed, as recently as 1953, that Radalas repudiated Govi connections and that the status of the Govi caste still remained relatively low in villages where the Radala existed. The demand by the Kandyan Radala elite for a separate federal state in independent Ceylon, the representations made to the Donoughmore Commission and the formation of the Kandyan National Assembly (KNA) as recently as in 1924, demonstrates the reluctance of the Kandyan elite to be governed by arriviste low country Govigama families of dubious ancestry, which was to be the inevitable outcome of the British departure.

The Radalas as a community had significant power over the throne of Kandy. This was the case as the last Nayakar King of Kandy, Sri Wickrema Rajasinha lost his throne soon after losing the military and administrative support of the Radalas for his cruelty towards his subjects, and for his licentious forced affairs with their wives and daughters.

=== The British Radalas ===
A group of British appointed Kandyan chiefs, with Hon. J. P. Lewis, Government Agent in 1905. The chiefs have adopted the dress of traditional Dissawas by this time but still haven't started using other traditional insignia of high offices such as jewellery, ceremonial daggers or footwear.

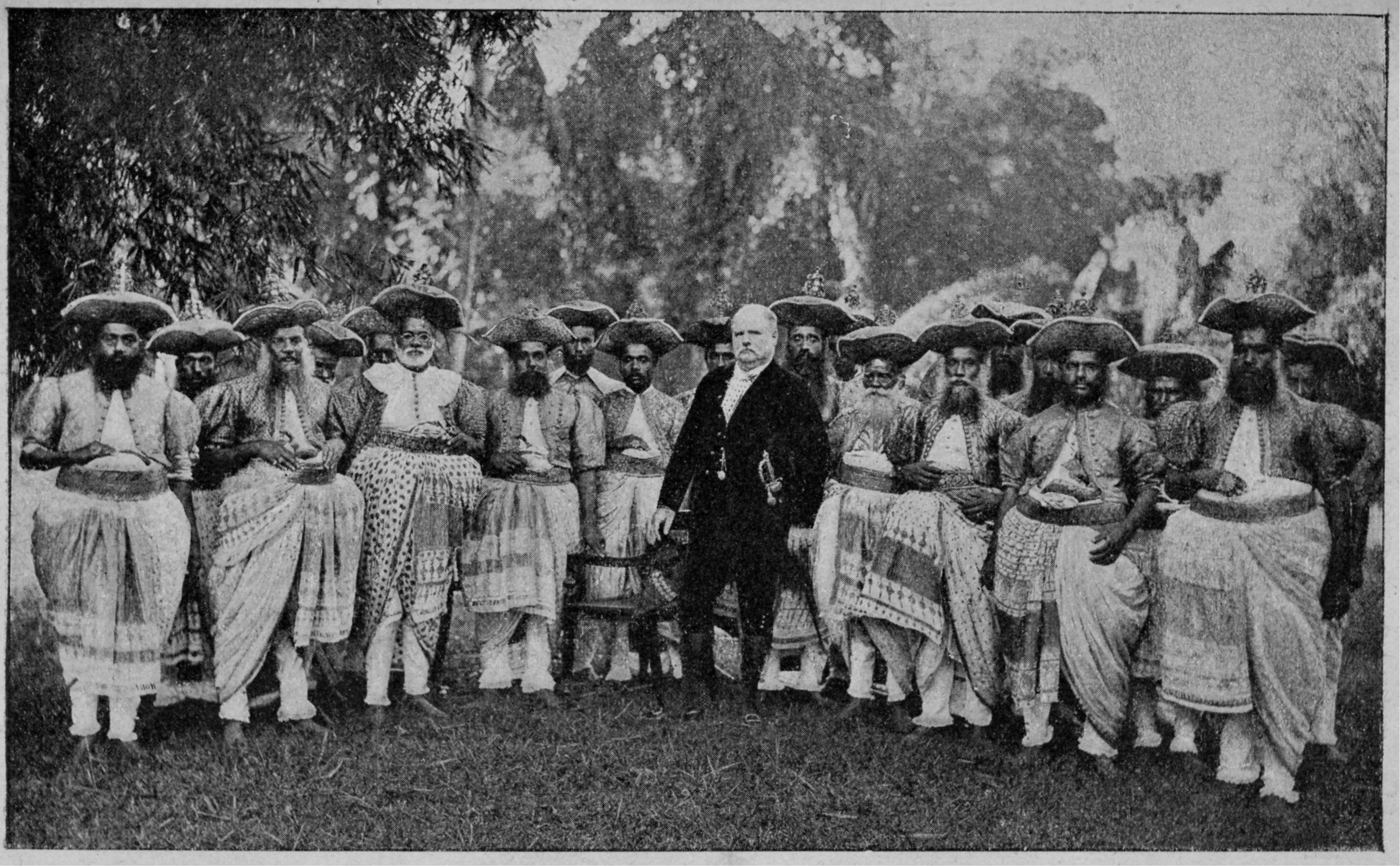
A group of British appointed Kandyan chiefs, with a British Governor in 1905.

After capturing the Kandyan provinces in 1815, the British soon created an extensive class of 'New Radalas' in the Kandyan territory to assist them with its administration. As much as the British created class of Sri Lankan Mudaliyars in the low-country, this class too was composed of natives who were most likely to serve the British, Govigama families that had either cooperated with the British to capture Kandy or from miscellaneous lower caste families that had joined the British cause later for financial purposes.

They were all from anglicised families and were considered pillars of the Anglican church. They had English first names and their children too were similarly named. In addition, they had a string of high-sounding Sinhala names taken on when receiving their appointment from the British. Some of these names were from Kandyan families that had ceased to exist or were severely reduced, and from purported ancestors with dubious connections. The new British-made Radala class were immediately rejected by the original Kandyan Radalas. The new British-made Radalas tried unsuccessfully to rename themselves with the names of famous Kandyan Radalas such as the Keppitipolas, Mampitiyas, and Ranarajas. All these attempts were rejected by the British for fear of further dissent by the original Kandyan Radalas.

Many of these 'New Radala' families had low-country origins and many intermarried with the anglicized low country Mudaliyar class, and in many cases several times with one family in an apparent bid to create some exclusivity. Most were from the Sabaragamuwa province and not from interior parts of the Kandyan provinces that were less susceptible to British influence. These New Radals too resembled English country squires and most of them had received large land grants from the British for their servitude. Their residences were of unprecedented scale, built in the 19th century in the British colonial style and were referred to by the Tamil word Walauu or Walvoo.

They generally held 'Rate Mahattaya' or local administrator positions and had studied under leading Anglican Priests at the Anglican missionary schools S. Thomas' College, Trinity College, Kandy and Ratnapura High School, which were institutions set up by the British specifically for producing a class of loyal, local, second-level administrators. With each successive batch of British Civil Servants and Governors arriving in Sri Lanka, this propped-up pseudo-aristocratic group tried harder and harder to generate a greater and higher appearance of nobility and Kandyan lineage.

However, the descendants of the original Kandyan Radalas rarely marry the descendants of British-made Radalas or any other Govigamas for that matter.

=== 20th century ===
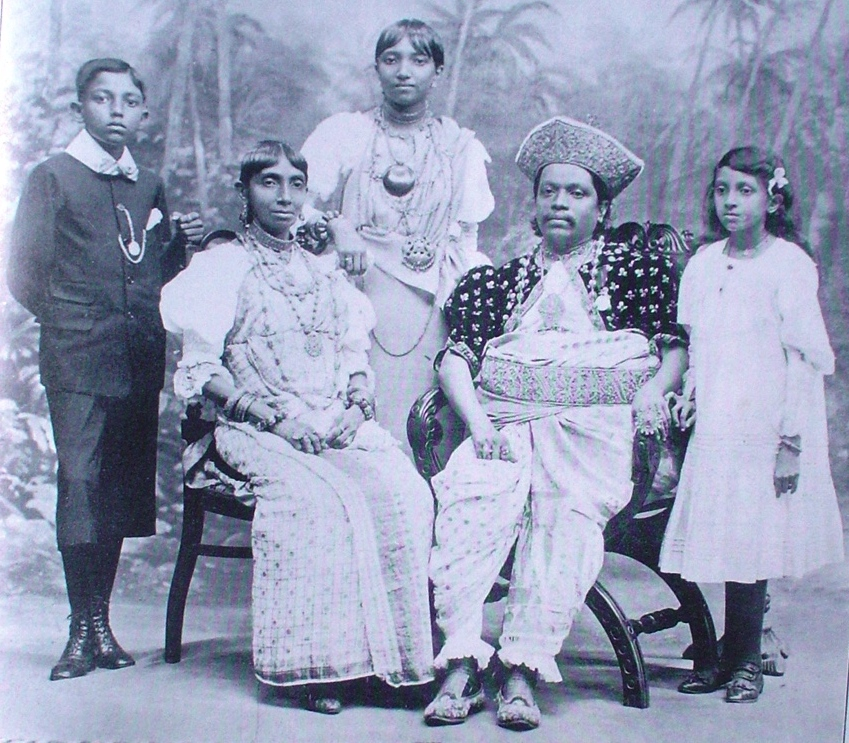
Front Centre (seated):John Henry Meediniya Adigar with his family in 1905. Rear Centre (standing): his daughter, Alice, who married the low-country newspaper magnate D. R. Wijewardena in 1916.

The marriage in 1910 to Kandyan 'New Radala' Mollie Dunuwila, newspaper magnate D. R. Wijewardena's marriage in 1916 to a Meedeniya and finally S. W. R. D. Bandaranayake's marriage in 1940 to Sirimavo Ratwatte appear to have muted some of the antipathies and created the common political power block that has ruled the country since independence from the British in 1948. The Radalas however, are still relatively endogamous and, even to date, would only rarely marry an average Govigama in an arranged marriage.

=== Nilame ===
Nilame word referred to the court officials. The names of the officials were given according to their position in each dynasty. Due to the development of language and changes in requirements, the positions were changed and their names were changed. In the Kandyan dynasty, there are several officials in the court or "Raja wasala". They were Adigar and Dissava.

=== Banda ===
A Banda or Bandâra was the child of royal concubines of Nayaks of Kandy and descendants of Pandarams Desikar who came down to Sri Lanka from Tamil Nadu for service of Hindu temples. They were also considered the second class of Radala.

=== Patti ===
Patti Radala is a traditional caste of Herdsmen from Sri Lanka's feudal past. They were a part of the feudal land tenure system and a sub-caste of the Radala caste. Gopallawa, Kiridena, Kiriella, Panabokke, Walgama and many other names related to caws are common in this third class of the Patti Radala community.

== See also ==
- Kandyan Convention
- Kastane
- Native headmen of Ceylon
- Rate Mahatmaya
- Walauwa
