= Kandyan Royal Consorts =

Queen Consort of Kingdom of Kandy
- අග බිසව

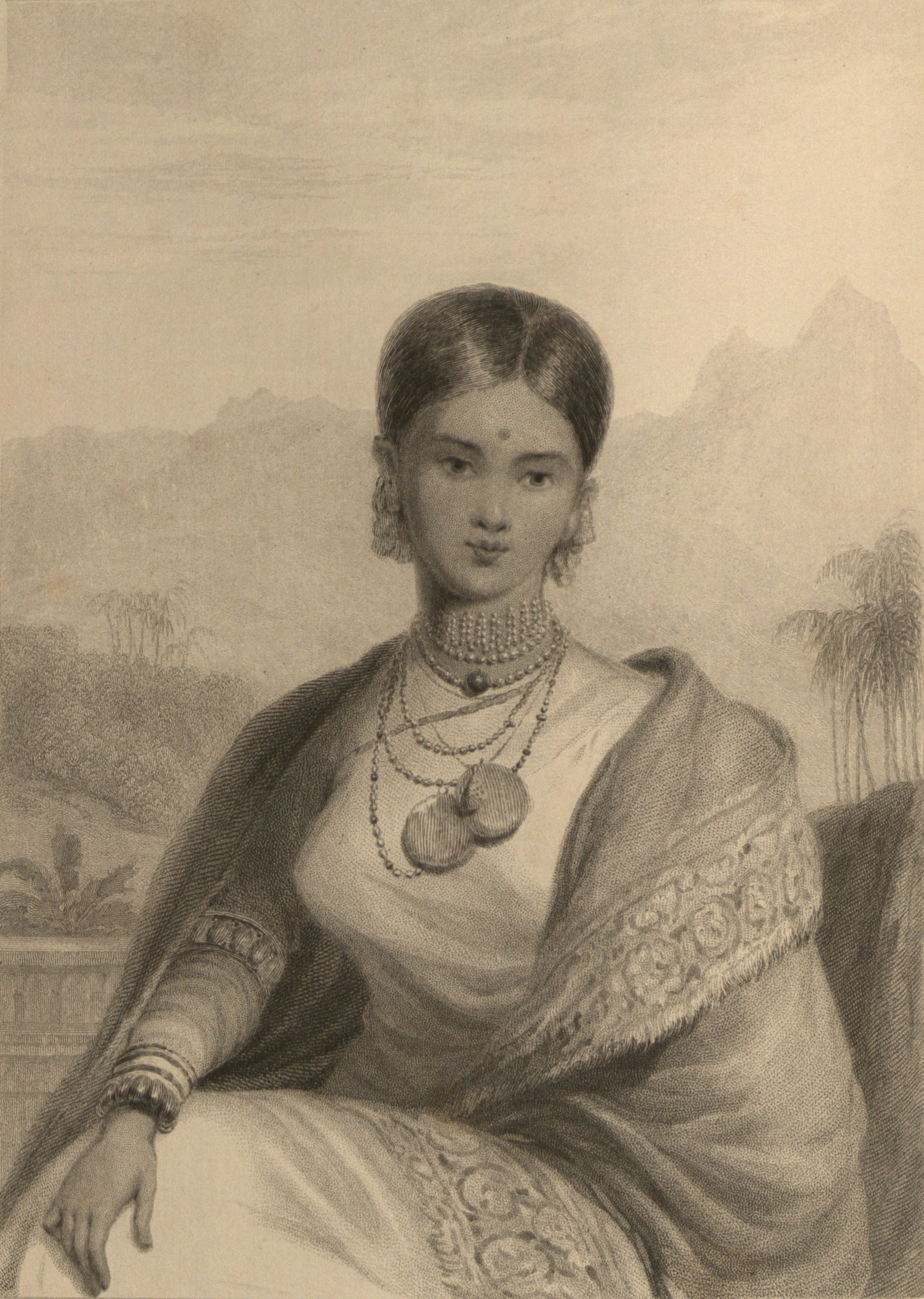
- Queen Consort Venkata Rangammal Devi
- Style: Her Majesty
- Member of: Inner Court
- Residence: Meda Wasala
- Appointer: The Monarch
- Formation: 1469
- First holder: Mayurawathi of Gampola
- Final holder: Venkata Rangammal Devi
- Abolished: 1815
- Unofficial names: Randoli

In the Kingdom of Kandy in Sri Lanka, the Kings maintained a harem that consisted of a chief queen and one or two secondary queens. In addition to the queens, the harem also included concubines, who were divided into three categories based on their rank. The highest-ranking category was Randoli, which consisted of consorts of royal blood who held the position of chief queen. The second category, Rididoli, consisted of consorts from either noble families of royal lineage or sisters of Randoli. The lowest ranking category was Yakadadoli, who were from the Radala (Elite) castes.

The names Randoli, Rididoli, and Yakadadoli are believed to have originated from the palanquins used by the different ranks of consorts of the Kings of the Kingdom of Kandy in Sri Lanka. The Randoli consorts used a palanquin made from gold, which is reflected in their name. The Rididoli consorts used a palanquin made from silver, and the Yakadadoli consorts used a palanquin made from iron. This naming convention was likely used to differentiate the different ranks and levels of status among the royal consorts.

- Rank I - Randoli (Sinhala: රන් දෝලිය)
- Rank II - Rididoli (Sinhala: රිදී දෝලිය)
- Rank III - Yakadadoli (Sinhala: යකඩ දෝලිය)

== Queen Consort ==
Queen Consort (Sinhala: අග බිසව) was the highest-ranked position in the Randoli category, and her biological or adoptive children were the only ones qualified to succeed to the throne. Children of both Rididoli and Yakadadoli were disqualified from kingship. In the Kandyan Kingdom, the position of Queen Consort did not hold political power but enjoyed equal status as the king.

In the first dynasty to rule the Kingdom of Kandy, the House of Siri Sanghabo, the kings married Sinhalese royal blood lineage (Gampola, Keerawalle) as the Queen Consort. However, in the second dynasty, House of Dinaraja, the kings married South Indian princesses of the Madurai royal family, except for the first and the second king, who married the only successor of the previous dynasty, Siri Sanghabo.

In the last and the third dynasty, Nayakkar, the kings married South Indian princesses of Madurai. In this dynasty, the position of Queen Consort was more significant. They did not have any direct political powers, but they had the right to appoint the next successor to the throne, and their families had influence in the court of the Kandy.

=== Pramila Devi ===
One of the most famous queen consorts in the history of the Kandy Kingdom was Pramila Devi, who hailed from the Nayakkar Dynasty of Madurai. However, her association with the second adigar of the court, Daskon, who was of Portuguese and French descent and a close friend of the king, was frowned upon as a forbidden affair. Despite being a consort, Pramila Devi was childless and refused to adopt the king's only son from a Yakadadoli (royal concubine), leaving the question of succession to the throne in doubt. In the end, she appointed her brother as the Apa (ඈපා, Great Duke), a powerful position, to be the next king of the kingdom, thereby establishing a new dynasty.

=== Kusumasana Devi ===
Kusumāsana Devi, also known as Don Catherine of Kandy, was a significant figure in the history of the Kingdom of Kandy. As the only heir to the throne of Kandy from her father's lineage, she briefly ruled the kingdom as queen regnant backed by the Portuguese army in 1581. However, she was deposed by Vimaladharmasuriya I of Kandy due to political reasons. Kusumāsana Devi eventually married Vimaladharmasuriya I, becoming a queen consort. Due to her unique position as the heir to the throne, she enjoyed more significant political powers than any other queen consort in the history of the kingdom. However, after Vimaladharmasuriya I's sudden death, she decided to become the regent of the kingdom to pass the throne to her son, Mahastane Adahasin. Unfortunately, her plans were disrupted when Senarath of Kandy forcefully married her to establish himself as the king of Kandy. Despite being a queen consort, she was relatively inactive in politics during the reign of Senarath due to her physical and mental illness, which was most likely caused by forced marriage. Kusumāsana Devi fell ill after her son Mahastane Adahasin died in 1612, and she died on 10 July 1613 at the age of 35.

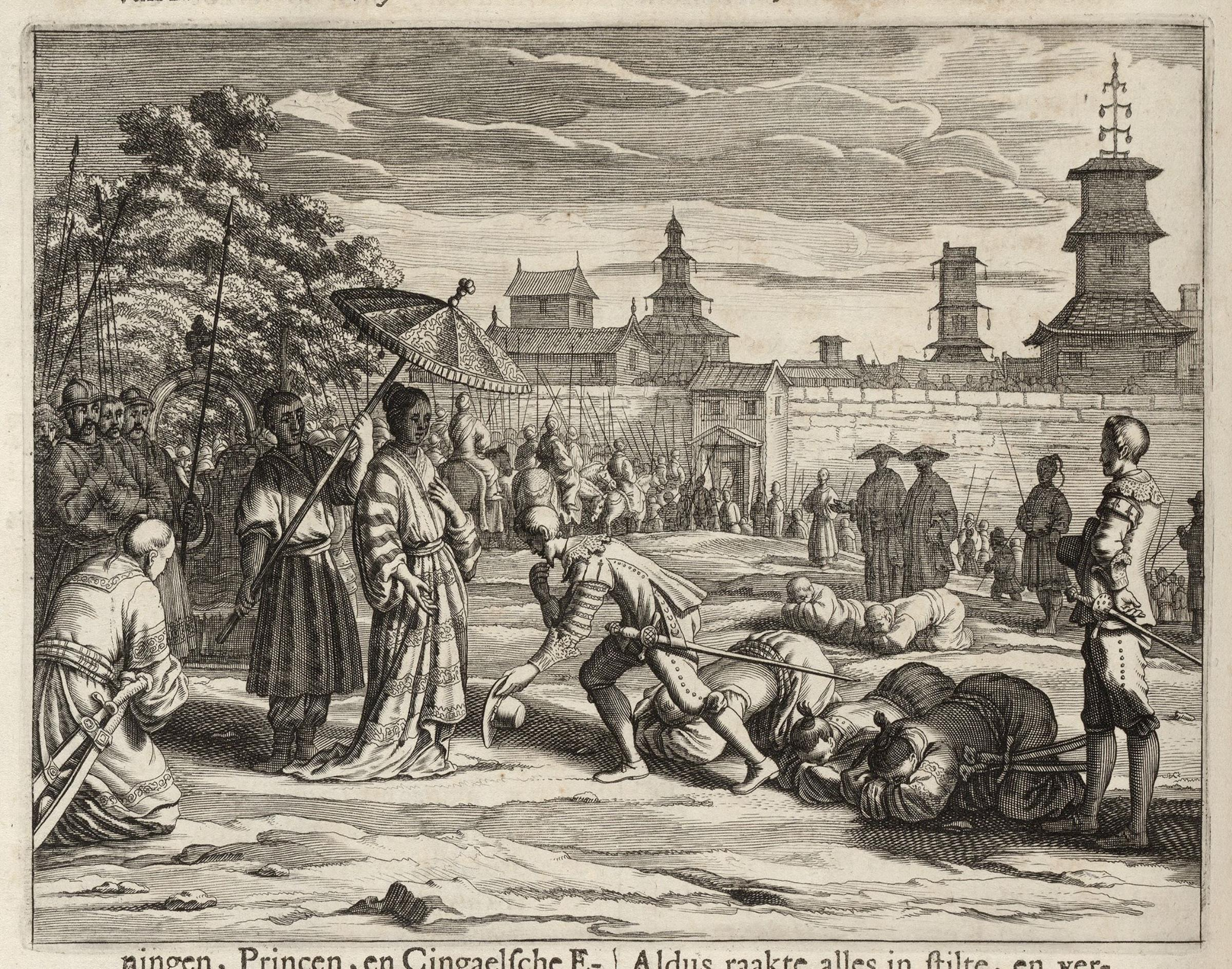
The Portuguese Pedro Lopez welcomes the Empress of Ceylon, Dona Catharina.

=== Venkata Rangammal Devi ===
Venkata Rangammal was the mysterious queen consort who held the title in the final years of the Kingdom of Kandy. Not much is known about her life, but it is said that she lived a secluded life in the queen's quarters (Meda Wasala). Only her closest servants were able to catch a glimpse of her. After she was deposed from her position, she did not live much longer and died childless in the Vellore fort. Her life remains shrouded in mystery, leaving historians and curious minds to wonder about her story.

=== Queens' Chambers ===
The Queens' Chambers, also known as the Meda Wasala (Sinhala: මැද වාසල), is located to the north of the Palle Vahale, which was used as quarters for the royal concubines and is similar in architectural design. It consists of a small open courtyard with verandahs and a single bedroom, constructed of valuable timber with a bed placed on four stone understructures. The entrance to the middle hall is made of large logs, and the door lid is small, attached to the tile with wooden hinges. The building is designed to be locked only from the inside, and the corridor near the courtyard carries frescoes, a unique feature for a residence.

Many features of Kandy era architecture can be seen in the Meda Wasala, including wooden pillars with carvings, piyassa with pebbles, a central courtyard with padma boradam, and a drain system built around it. According to historical records of the Kandy era, King Sri Vikrama Rajasingha secluded Queen Rangammal in this building, and only her closest servants had the chance to see her. Despite its size, the Meda Wasala has only one room, and four copper sheets in the archaeological museum are believed to have been used as a protective spell buried in pits in the four pillars of the bed. These mantras were likely used for the protection of sexual affairs. Some flower patterns drawn on a red background have also been found under the plaster on the surface of the wall.

== The Wedding Ceremony of Queen Consort ==
The wedding ceremony of the queen consort of Kandy, as detailed in "An Account of the Interior of Ceylon, and of Its Inhabitants" by John Davy, was a grand and elaborate affair. The Adikars first determined a lucky day and hour for the celebration and lavishly decorated the queen's apartment, Meda Wasala (Sinhala: මැද වාසල). On the wedding day, the king arrived and was presented with flowers by the chiefs while the ladies rubbed sandal powder and other perfumes on his arms. The same attention was given to the bride upon her arrival.

The ceremony continued for several days, during which the bride and groom underwent various traditional customs. They were bathed, dressed in saffron robes, and blessed by each member of the company as two necklaces were carried around on a gold plate. The father or nearest male relative of the bride poured water on betel leaves from a gold pot and declared that he relinquished his daughter to the king. The mother was asked if she assented, and upon answering in the affirmative, the king put a necklace around the bride's neck and clasped it. The curtain was then removed, and the bride and groom saw each other for the first time, joining their little fingers and tying the ends of their clothes together. This part of the ceremony was repeated for four successive days, and on the fourth day, the king put the second necklace on the bride and clasped it, completing the entire marriage rites.

The following day, the king and queen engaged in a playful activity of throwing perfumed balls and squirting scented water at each other. Even the wives of the chiefs were allowed to participate in this activity. Afterward, the chiefs and their ladies were invited to the palace for a grand supper, during which they were entertained with performances by dancers, singing girls, and musicians. The king presided over the entertainment, seated in an elevated chair, encouraging mirth and facetious conversation. Separate dishes, including two or three hundred different kinds of curries, were served, and milk or a sweet beverage resembling lemonade was offered as a drink.

The chiefs had the duty of making presents to the king and queen the following month, according to their respective ranks, situations, and means. The presents consisted of trinkets, jewels, and embroidered cloths, with each offering divided into two portions, one for the king and the other for the queen. The chiefs and their wives were invited to another supper and entertainment, during which they presented their gifts with all possible respect and attended by musicians, dancers, and singers.

Overall, the wedding ceremony of the queen consort of Kandy was an occasion filled with festivities and an unusual exchange of civilities.

== Royal Consort ==
Rididoli (Sinhala: රිදී දෝලිය), also known as secondary queen consorts or Royal Consorts, were women who held the second-highest rank among the concubines in the harem of the Kings of the Kingdom of Kandy. They were either sisters or relatives of the Randoli, the queen consort. Their sons, however, could not ascend to the throne, but their offspring were often appointed as high officials of the royal court. If the queen consort adopted their sons, they could have a chance to become the king, although in history, no son of a Rididoli was appointed as a king.

Favorite consorts of the king frequently received land grants, and they used a palanquin made from silver that reflected their level in the royal household. Muttu Kannamma Devi Degal Sami and Venkata Ammal Degal Sami were the last Rididolis in the Kandyan court.

During the reign of Sri Rajadhi Rajasinha of Kandy, the royal court was greatly influenced by several royal consorts, known as Rididolis. Among these influential consorts were Upendra Ammah, also known as Opiantia Ammah, and Renganaikie Ammah, who was the sister of the queen consort Alamaloo Ammah and also the sister of Ramasamy. Upendra Ammah, the cousin of Ramasamy, had a son named Coomarasamy Raja. Coomarasamy Raja was jointly adopted by Queen Consort Alamaloo Ammah and Royal Consort Renganaikie Ammah. He went on to have a son named Muttusamy Raja, who would become an important figure in the Kandyan court. The relationships and influence of these Rididolis, particularly Upendra Ammah, Renganaikie Ammah, and their adopted son Coomarasamy Raja, highlight the complex political and social dynamics of the Kandyan court during Sri Rajadhi Rajasinha's reign.

=== Royal Consorts Quarters ===
The Royal Consorts Quarters, also known as the Lower Palace or Palle Wahale (Sinhala: පල්ලේ වාසල), is a historical building constructed during the Sri Vickrama Rajasingha era. It was primarily used as the quarters for the king's royal concubines, known as Ridi dolis and Yakada dolis. The main doorway leads to a small hall in front of the central building, flanked on either side by two wings. Inner verandahs on all four sides face an inner central courtyard. The windows are made of wooden poles with cracks, and legend has it that King Kirti Sri Rajasingha first resided in this building. In 1942, the building was converted into the National Museum of Kandy and is currently maintained by Department of National Museums.

== Royal Concubine ==
Yakadadoli (Sinhala: යකඩ දෝලිය) were a group of royal concubines who belonged to elite castle families known as Radala. Many of their fathers served as officials to the king, and they lived in separate mansions (Walawwa) near the royal palace. Some of them also resided in Palle Wahale, the royal consort quarters. However, their children were disqualified from inheriting the throne.

Favorite concubines frequently received land grants, and their offspring were appointed as high officials of the royal court. If the queen consort, Randoli, adopted their sons, they had a chance to ascend to the throne. In one rare case, Muthukuda Devi, a Yakadadoli from Vimaladharmasuriya II of Kandy, had her son, Prince Kundasale, adopted as the son of the Madurai queen consort. He succeeded the throne on June 4, 1707, as Vira Narendra Sinha of Kandy. However, another prince from a different Yakadadoli, Prince Pattiye Bandara, who was not adopted by the queen consort, was disqualified from inheriting the throne when his brother, Prince Kundasale, was crowned as the king.

One of the Yakadadoli in the harem of the Nayakkar King Kirti Sri Rajasinghe (AD 1747 - 1782) was the daughter of the Bintenne Disawe and the granddaughter of Mámpitiye Disawe. She had a very capable and popular son by the king, named Mámpitiya Bandára. However, Mámpitiya Bandara was not considered an heir to the throne. This Yakadadoli was later selected as a mistress of Kirti Sri Rajasinghe's successor, Rajádhi Rajasinghe (A. D. 1782 - 1798).

As per customary law, anyone seeking refuge in the house of a Yakadadoli could not be arrested.
