= Sinhala kingdom =

Series of monarchies in Sri Lanka from 543 BCE to 1815 CE

The Sinhala kingdom or Sinhalese kingdom refers to the successive Sinhalese kingdoms that existed in what is today Sri Lanka. The Sinhalese kingdoms are kingdoms known by the city at which its administrative centre was located. (Note: such as Anuradhapura and Polonnaruwa kingdoms) These are in chronological order: the kingdoms of Tambapanni, Upatissa Nuwara, Anuradhapura, Polonnaruwa, Dambadeniya, Gampola, Kotte, Sitawaka, Raigama and Kandy.

== History ==
The Sinhala kingdom ceased to exist by 1815, following the British takeover. While the Sinhala kingdom is claimed to have existed from 543 BCE to 1815 CE, other political entities claimed to have co-existed in Sri Lanka spanning certain partial periods, including the Jaffna kingdom (which existed 1215–1624 CE), Vanni chieftaincies (which existed from the 12th century to 1803 CE) and the Portuguese and Dutch colonies (which existed 1597–1658 CE and 1640–1796 respectively). During these partial periods of time, these political entities were not part of the Sinhala kingdom, except Jaffna and the Vanni chieftaincies following the invasion by Parakramabahu VI, until his death. (Note: Parakramabahu VI was the last Sinhalese king to control the entirety of Sri Lanka.) Records by Faxian thero and the Mahavamsa suggests it may have extended to Maldives and parts of India as well.

== Epochs according to the Mahavamsa chronology ==
- Kingdom of Tambapanni (543 BC–505 BC)
- Kingdom of Upatissa Nuwara (505–377 BC)
- Kingdom of Anuradhapura (377 BC – 1017 AD)
- Kingdom of Polonnaruwa (1056–1236)
- Kingdom of Dambadeniya (1236–1272)
- Kingdom of Yapahuwa (1272–1284)
- Kingdom of Kurunegala (1293–1341)
- Kingdom of Gampola (1341–1411)
- Kingdom of Kotte (1412–1598)
- Kingdom of Raigama (1521–1538)
- Kingdom of Sitawaka (1521–1593)
- Kingdom of Kandy (1590–1815)
