= Kuruvita Rala =

17th-century Sri Lankan rebel leader, regent of Kandy, and prince of Uva

Kuruvita Rala (also spelled Kuruwita Rala, also known as Antonio Barreto and Kuruvita Bandara) was a Sri Lankan rebel leader and prince of Uva, who served as regent in the kingdom of Kandy. He was also a relation of Dona Catherina, Queen of Kandy and the guardian of her children.

== History ==
=== First revolt, (1603) ===
Antonio Barreto as he was known, was a Sinhalese Catholic Karava soldier from the Kingdom of Kotte, who had initially fought on the side of the Portuguese Empire as a Lascarin commander. Barreto lead a rebellion against the Governor of Portuguese Ceylon, Jerónimo de Azevedo, in 1603 after his comrade Vimaladharmasuriya I seized power in the Kingdom of Kandy. Barreto forced the Portuguese forts in the Kuruwita region to capitulate. Antonio Barreto fought on the side of Kandy kingdom where he gained high office under Vimaladharmasuriya I under the name Kuruvita Rala and was rewarded with the title "Prince of Uva".

=== Second revolt, (1616–1619) ===
Vimaladharmasuriya I who died in 1603 was succeeded by his cousin Senarat of Kandy by marrying the king's queen, Dona Catherina. Writing in the mid 17th century, Philippus Baldaeus states that with the demise of the heir to the throne under suspicious circumstances and the illness of Senarat, Kuruvita Rala was tasked with administering the kingdom. In December 1616, he led the Kandyan army and seized the Portuguese fort at Sabaragamuwa. In contrast to Kuruvita Rala who fought most of his battles on land, was his nephew the admiral of Senerats naval fleets, fighting the enemies on the sea such as the Kandyan Naval Raid (1612-13) and met with great success.

Nikapitiye, one pretending to be the grandson of Rajasinha I of Sitawaka, had after his victory against a Portuguese battle asked Senerat for the hand of one of the daughters of the Kandy Queen. Kuruvita Rala enraged by Senerat marrying the daughters, refusing Nikapitiye's request and persisting on peace with the Portuguese, raided the Kandy Kingdom and rebelled against Senerat in 1617, driving him out of the capital. Kuruvita Rala sieged the stronghold on much of the country including Batticaloa, Wellawaya, Negombo, parts of Sabaragamuwa, Matara and southern half of Kandy Kingdom. He thereupon invited Mayadunne of Denawaka residing in India, one of the Sitawaka line, to be crowned as the king of Sri Lanka.

=== Defeat, (1620) ===
The general Constantino de Sá de Noronha led a strong Portuguese force, forcing Kuruvita Rala to retire to Uva. In June 1620, de Sa led a campaign against Mayadunne and expelled him from Portuguese territory and he fled to India. A month later, Kuruvita Rala who chose to remain in the country, was captured and killed by the Dissava, Don Constantino of Matara, marking the end of the Portuguese opposition in the low lands.

== See also ==
- Sinhalese–Portuguese War
- Migapulle Arachchi
