= Kandyan commerce raiding against Portugal (1612–1613) =

Kandyan Naval Raid (1612–1613)
- Part of Sinhalese–Portuguese War
Date	16 May 1612 – 6 March 1613
Location	Indian Ocean and Portuguese Ceylon
Result	Kandyan victory

Belligerents
Kingdom of Kandy	Portuguese Empire

Commanders and leaders
Nephew of Kuruvita Rala (Name unknown), Wandige Nai Hami	Dom Jerónimo de Azevedo

Strength
3 war galleys 3 Yachts	Total strength unknown

Casualties and losses
No naval losses reported	1 Ship; 2 patasios vessels 4 Fustas; 20 Barques; 3 Ships captured estimated 400 - 500 Portuguese captured or killed

The Kandyan naval raid was a series of commerce raidings by the Kingdom of Kandy against the Portuguese Empire from 16 May 1612 to 6 March 1613. With the help of Dutch envoy Marcellus de Bochouwer, King Senarat of Kandy commissioned a fleet of 3 war galleys and 3 yachts under the Admiralty of a nephew of Kuruvita Rala, the prince of Uva. They sailed from Koddiyar bay and managed to engage and inflict losses on Portuguese shipping around Ceylon and along the coast line from Cape Comorin to Calicut.

== Background ==
After the death of King Vimaladharmasuriya I in 1604, the kingdom of Kandy became politically unstable due to a succession struggle which ultimately resulted in Senarat's ascension to throne. Senarat who used to be a monk, left priesthood on the request of his cousin, King Vimaladharmasuriya I, to be the regent of young Prince Mahastana. However, after the death of Vimaladharmasuriya, Senarat married Dona Catarina, the widow of deceased king and crowned himself as King Senarat of Kandy. As an ex-priest he lacked King Vimaladharmasuriya's military sense and dynamic leadership leaving the kingdom both politically and militarily vulnerable.

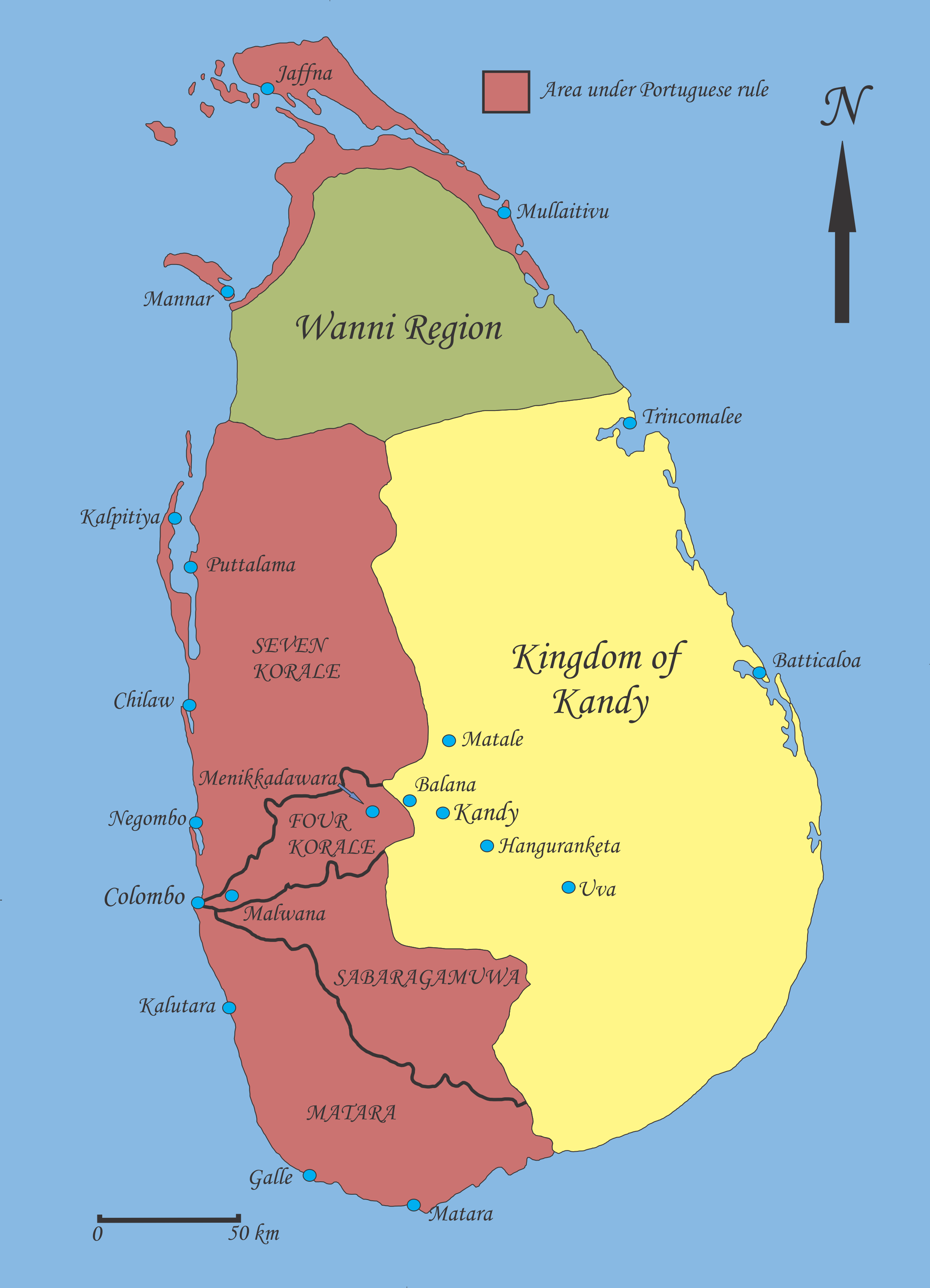
De jure political map of Sri Lanka, early 17th century

On the other hand, developments in the other regions of Portuguese Asia kept both Lisbon and Goa temporarily occupied, saving Kandy being an easy target for conquest. Wars of Achem, Malacca and destruction of the fleet of Conde de Feira D Joao Pereyra Frojas with 9000 men in 1608, diverted manpower from Portuguese Ceylon. According to historian Tikiri Abeysinghe, this "balance of weakness" prevented both sides from taking advantage of each other's weakness.

Governor of Ceylon, Dom Jerónimo de Azevedo now resolved to an economic war against Kandy. He occupied the Balana fortalice and biannually made raids deep into Kandyan territory laying waste to the countryside. King Senarat was irresolute and without mounting a defence fled to interior of the kingdom. After 1609, realizing that Portuguese are determined to conquest Kandy, Senerat actively sought aid from the Dutch. At his request the Dutch sent an envoy, Marcellus de Bochouwer, to negotiate a treaty. He arrived in Kandy on 8 March 1612 and on behalf of States General of Holland he made an agreement "to help the king when his realms were invaded by the Portuguese, in return for a fort at Kottiyar, all assistance for its erection and defence and all facilities and monopoly of trade". The state of the Kandy by this time is evident by a claim made by Bochouwer writing to the Dutch Governor of Pulicat "it is not possible that the king can hold out… until the coming year".

== Kandyan fleet ==
After the conclusion of the negotiations, King Senarat made Bochouwer a member of the Kandyan court and made him the prince of Migamuwa (Prince of Migonne, current day Negombo), Anuradhapura, Niwitigala and Kukulu Korale. Further he was elevated to the titles of "president of supreme council of war, second in his majesty’s secret council and Lord High Admiral".

At the request of King Senerath, as Lord High Admiral, he built a fleet of 3 war galleys and 3 yachts. They were crewed by Kandyans and the nephew of Kuruvita Rala was appointed as Admiral and Wandige Nai Hami was appointed as the Vice Admiral. They sailed out from Kottiyar bay at Trincomalee on 16 May 1612, with orders to "…intercept and capture the enemy vessels navigating between Cape Comoryn and Ceylon with instructions not to give quarters to the Portugezen or any enemies of the state, save the women children and slaves..(sic)".

Kandyan Fleet (16 May 1612 – 6 March 1613) Admiral – Nephew of Prince of Uva Vice Admiral – Wandige Nai Hami
Name	Notes
Kandy	A War Galley Captained by Sanderappu
Hollant	A War Galley Captained by Kitsena
Migamuwa(Migonne)	A War Galley Captained by Dingappo
Furtuyn	A Yacht captained by Ordia
Geluk	A Yacht captained by Marasinghe
De Trouwe	A Yacht captained by Sanderappu

== Naval encounters ==
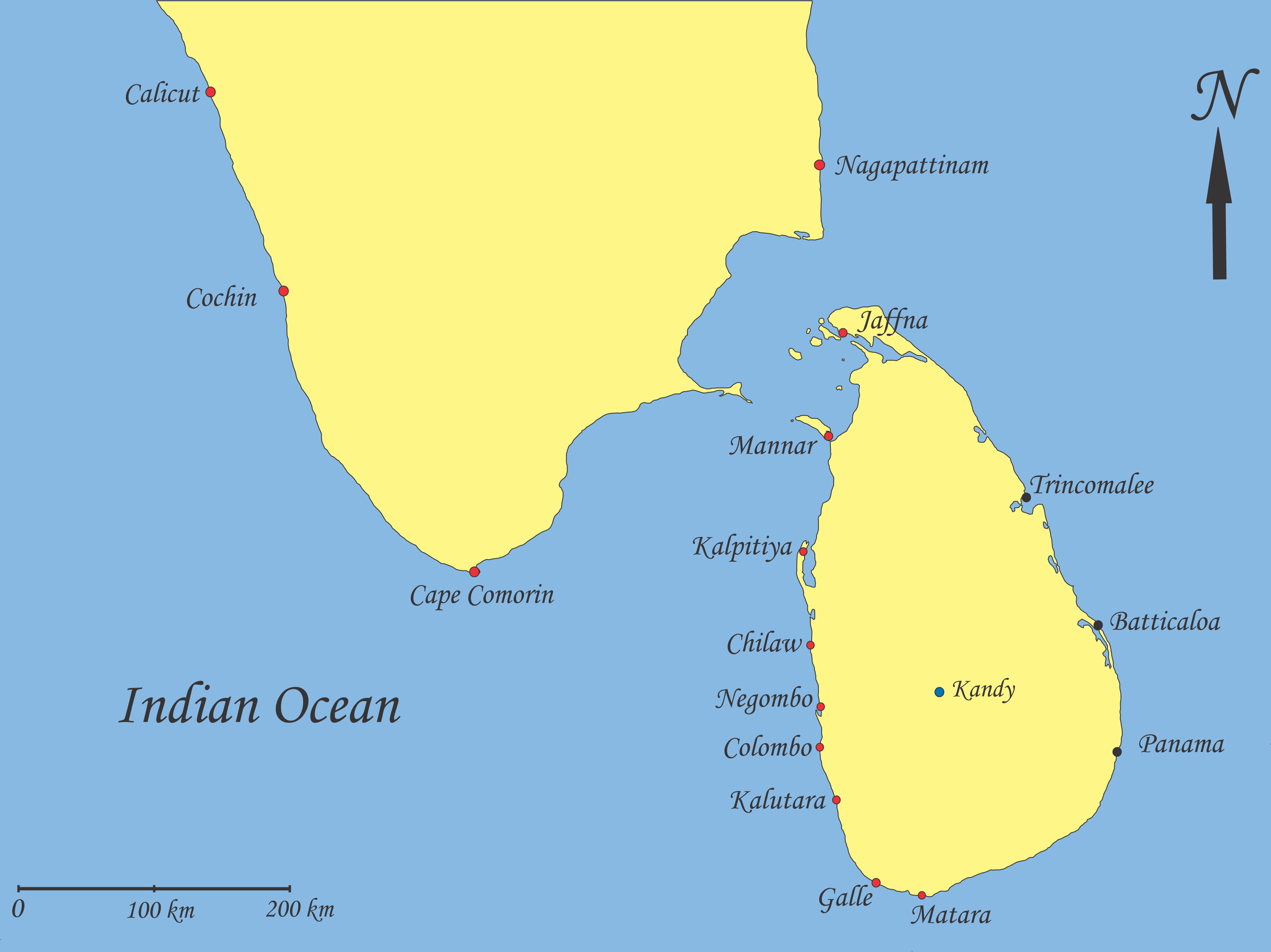
Locations important to the Kandyan Naval raid. Portuguese naval bases are shown in red while Kandyan naval bases are shown in Black.

The fleet engaged Portuguese shipping between Negombo and Mannar to north of Chilaw. They managed to capture and destroy 2 Portuguese vessels called patasios, 3 Fustas and 20 Barques. Another fusta was destroyed between Calicut and Cape Comorin. Here they chased and ran aground a Portuguese ship which tried to escape. Later they captured a richly laden moor ship from Ormuz, which was sailing towards Cochin. In another engagement a ship sailing from Bengal was captured and the Portuguese men were pitched overboard. The women and slave were brought back as prisoners. On their return trip, near Panama they captured a Portuguese ship at anchor with cargo. It had been deserted by her crew.

== Aftermath ==
They returned to Koddiyar bay on 6 March 1613 with captured spoils. Nearly 6 tons of treasures were among them. As ordered by the King, these spoils were distributed among officers and Kandyan soldiers.

== Bibliography ==
1. C. Gaston Perera, Kandy fights the Portuguese – a military history of Kandyan resistance. Vijithayapa Publications: Sri Lanka, June 2007. ISBN 978-955-1266-77-6
2. Fernao de Queyroz, The temporal and spiritual conquest of Ceylon. (SG Perera, Trans.) AES reprint. New Delhi: Asian Educational Services; 1995. ISBN 81-206-0764-3
3. Paul E. Peiris, Ceylon the Portuguese Era: being a history of the island for the period, 1505–1658, Volume 1. Tisara Publishers Ltd.: Sri Lanka, 1992. – (Link). OCLC 12552979.
4. Phillipus Baldaeus, "A True and Exact Description of the Great Island of Ceylon", The Ceylon Historical Journal, Volume III, No 1–4. Published in co-operation with the Ceylon Branch of the Royal Asiatic Society, July 1958 to April 1959.
5. S.G. Perera, A history of Ceylon for schools – The Portuguese and Dutch period. The Associated Newspapers of Ceylon Ltd.: Sri Lanka, 1942. – (Link). OCLC 10531673.
