= Vimaladharmasuriya =

Vimaladharmasūriya is a Sinhala regnal name. It may refer to:

- Vimaladharmasuriya I of Kandy (1590–1604), King of Kandy
- Vimaladharmasuriya II of Kandy (1687–1707), King of Kandy
