= Balana Fort =

- Part of Kandy District
- Gannoruwa, Sri Lanka

Site information
- Type: Defence fort
- Condition: Remnant

Location
- Sri Lanka
- Coordinates: 7.270409°N 80.475876°E

Site history
- Built by: Kingdom of Kandy
- Battles/wars: First battle with Sitavaka (1582); Second battle with Sitavaka (1593); Battle of Danture (1594); The Great Retreat (1603); Battle of Gannoruwa (1638)

Balana Fort (Sinhala: බලන කොටුව) was a fortified pass of the Kingdom of Kandy located near the Alagalla Mountain Range, Sri Lanka. Balana which means the 'look out' in Sinhala, functioned as a strategic outpost and fortress of the kingdom which was situated along the historical Colombo-Kandy road.

== History ==
Many invasions targeting the Kingdom of Kandy occurred near the Alagalla Mountains. Many decisive military campaigns and battles took place centered on Balana by the Kingdoms of Kotte and Sitavaka and European colonial powers. Most notable were the defeat of the Sitavaka army in 1593 and the Portuguese in 1603.

The first description of a fortress at Balana is from the mid-1590s which was built by King Vimaladharmasuriya I. During the weak reign of King Senerat, the Portuguese managed to occupy Balana (c. 1615–1616) and are reported to have made a fort of wood. No major battles were fought at Balana in the 17th and 18th centuries due to it being abandoned in the face of invading armies, which was part of the larger Kandyan strategy - of allowing an invading army entry and blocking their retreat. The last record of a fortification at Balana was in 1765 when the Dutch narrowly missed being routed at Balana. The two expeditions mounted by the British in 1803 and 1815 also saw no action at Balana.

After the fall of the Kandyan kingdom in 1815, the Balana fort and pass was abandoned forever, with the British establishing a new military post at Amunupura about a mile to the east of Balana.

When the British established themselves in Kandy, the colonisers raised tea and coffee plantations near the Colombo-Kandy railway line which ran below the fort; and with the construction of the present Colombo-Kandy road via Kadugannawa, Balana lost its importance altogether.

== Present remains ==
The present remains consist of the foundations of an upper fort (conserved) and a lower fort (unconserved). The upper fort located on the summit of the Balana hill consists of a quadrangular layout with three circular bastions and a narrow entrance facing the east. This section was conserved in the mid-1980s and is the most well known part of the fort. The lower fort consists of a rampart with a perpendicular retaining wall running down hill and across the road. This section is under thick vegetation and in ruinous condition. An archaeological survey has been conducted since 2017 which has resulted in producing a detailed ground plan of the site and the first LiDAR surveyed terrain map of the fort. The LiDAR survey has identified the remains of a dry ditch encircling the fort, which is not visible from the ground due to vegetation. Artefacts scattered on the surface are almost entirely of roof tile shards, indicating extensive built structures within the fort.

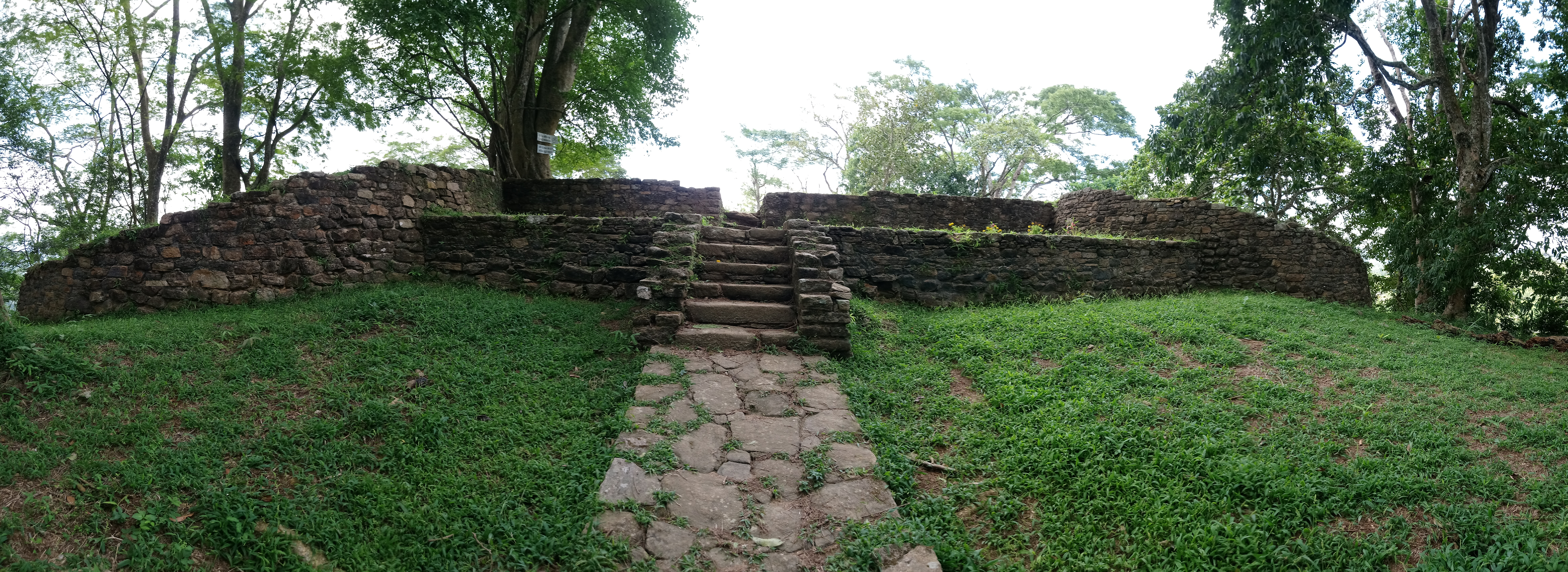
Front view of the main fort at Balana

Analysis of the remains suggest the defences of the fort were focused to the east, as opposed to prevent intrusion from the west (west of Balana is the lowlands which was under the control of Europeans). This suggest that the fort was designed to prevent an enemy from fleeing Kandyan territory rather than stopping an enemy on invasion to Kandy. This is in conformity with the overall Kandyan strategy.

Balana Fort is now a historical site managed by the Archaeological Department of Sri Lanka.
