= Campaign of Danture =

1594 Portuguese military campaign against the Kingdom of Kandy

- Part of the Sinhalese–Portuguese War
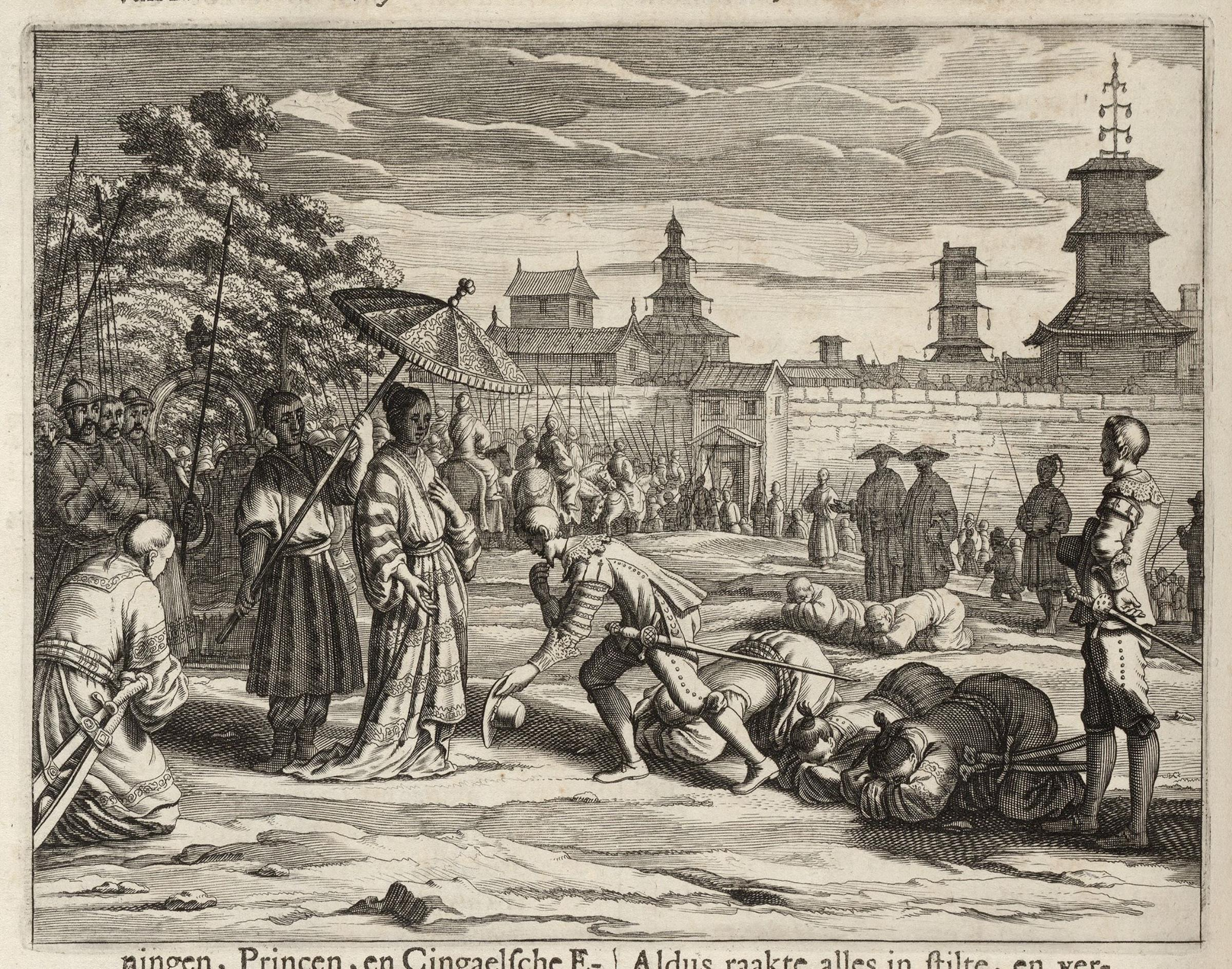
- The Portuguese army at Kandy during the campaign of Danture, by Philippus Baldaeus
Date	5 July 1594 – 9 October 1594 (3 months and 4 days)
Location	Danture, Kingdom of Kandy 07°16′55″N 80°32′27″E
Result	Kandyan victory

Belligerents
Portuguese Empire: Lascarins (local soldiers on the Portuguese side)	Kingdom of Kandy

Commanders and leaders
(Portuguese Empire) Pedro Lopes de Sousa † (Portuguese Empire) Francisco da Silva (Portuguese Empire) D. Gastão Coutinho † (Portuguese Empire) Francisco de Brito †; Jayavira Bandara Mudali †	(Kingdom of Kandy) Vimaladharmasuriya I (Kingdom of Kandy) Ekanayaka Mudali

Strength
On 5 July 1594; Total 20,000: ~1,000 Portuguese (estimates range from 800 to 1,474); 15,400 Lascarins; an unknown number of Badaga mercenaries and coolies; 47 elephants; By 8 October 1594: 368 Portuguese; a few Lascarins	On 5 July 1594; 10,000 men By 8 October 1594; 10,000–20,000 men (estimates range up to 40,000)

Casualties and losses
A handful of Portuguese and Lascarins escaped back to Colombo; 93 Portuguese were captured; the majority of the Lascarins deserted; the rest of the army was killed	5,000 Sinhalese Soldiers were killed till October 8th

The Campaign of Danture comprised a series of encounters between the Portuguese and the Kingdom of Kandy in 1594, part of the Sinhalese–Portuguese War. It is considered a turning point in the indigenous resistance to Portuguese expansion. For the first time in Sri Lanka, a Portuguese army was essentially annihilated, when they were on the verge of the total conquest of the island. A 20,000-strong Portuguese army, led by Governor Pedro Lopes de Sousa, invaded Kandy on 5 July 1594. After three months, severely depleted by guerilla warfare and mass desertions, what remained of the Portuguese army was annihilated at Danture by the Kandyans under King Vimaladharmasuriya. With this victory, the Kingdom of Kandy emerged as a major military power; it was to retain its independence, against Portuguese, Dutch, and British armies, until 1815.

Victory at Danture notwithstanding, only the mobile section of the Portuguese army in Ceylon was annihilated, while their strongholds remained intact, and so Kandy was unable to follow up with an advance into the lowlands. The Portuguese would in the future renew their offensive against Kandy under the reorganized forces of captain-general Dom Jerónimo de Azevedo, devastating Kandy in the process.

== Background ==
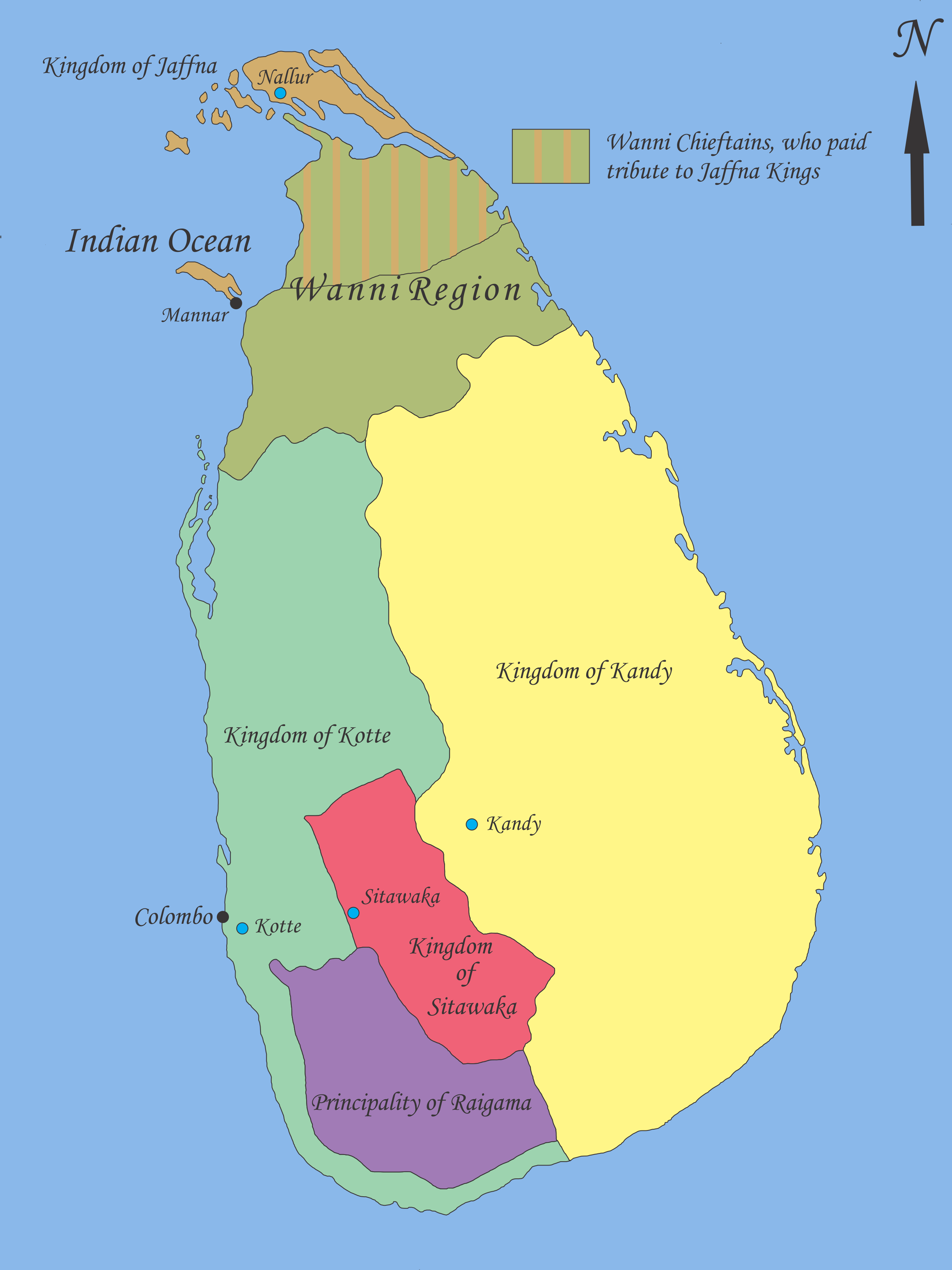
Political map of Sri Lanka soon after the Spoiling of Vijayabahu. In 1538, Sitawaka annexed the Principality of Raigama and gradually captured Kotte territories.

By the time of King Mayadunne's death in 1581, his Sitawaka kingdom controlled almost all the Sri Lankan lowlands except for a narrow stretch of territory along the west coast, which was ruled by King Dom João Dharmapala under the protection of the Portuguese. After Mayadunne's death, his son Tikiri Bandara succeeded to the Sitawaka throne as Rajasinha I of Sitawaka, also known as Sitawaka Rajasinghe.

Sitawaka Rajasinghe turned his attention to the Kingdom of Kandy, ruled by King Karaliyadde Bandara, whose daughter was married to Dom João Dharmapala. In 1582 Rajasinghe defeated the Kandyan army at Balana, with the assistance of a Kandyan chieftain, Virasundara Mudiyanse of Peradeniya. The Kandyan king, with his queen, son, infant daughter Kusumasana Devi, and nephew Yamasinghe Bandara, fled to Trincomalee under the protection of the Portuguese.

Soon King Karaliyadde Bandara, his son, and queen died of smallpox, after entrusting his infant daughter and nephew to the Portuguese. The king had named Yamasinghe Bandara as the heir to the throne of Kandy on condition that he marry Kusumasana Devi once she came of age. Yamasinghe Bandara was baptized Dom Filipe. Kusumasana Devi, baptized Dona Catarina, was educated by Catholic priests and brought up according to Portuguese customs.

Soon after the conquest, Kandy rose in rebellion against Sitawaka rule under Virasundara Mudiyanse, Rajasinghe's viceroy in the area. Summoned to Sitawaka under a parley, he was treacherously assassinated by Rajasinghe, who then crushed the rebellion with an iron fist. Hearing of his father's death, Konappu Bandara, son of Virasundara Mudiyanse, fled to Colombo and entered the service of King Dharmapala. He was baptized as Dom João of Austria, became a Lascarin leader and married the daughter of Tammita Bandara, by whom he had a son. He distinguished himself in battles against Rajasinghe, specially during the Siege of Colombo, soon rising to the rank of Mudali.

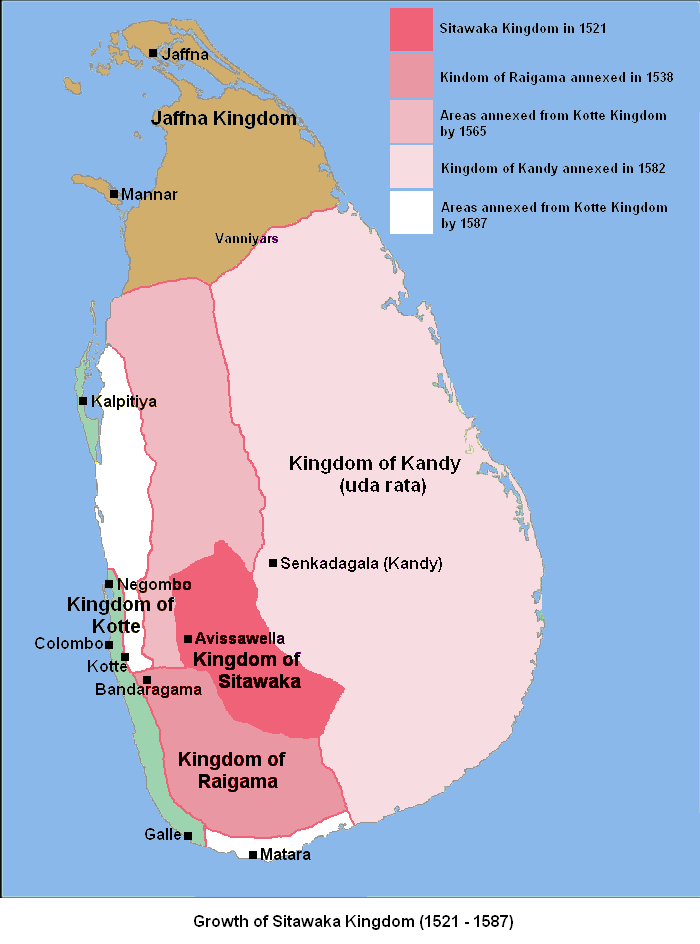
Growth of the Sitawaka kingdom from 1521 to 1587

In 1588, Kandy revolted again, this time under Dom Francisco Mudali, a Christian grandson of Gampola Devi. They expelled the agents of Sitawaka and sent a message to Dom Filipe (Yamasinghe Bandara, now the legitimate heir to the throne) requesting his return. Dom Filipe arrived in Kandy in 1592 with an army of 400 Portuguese under Captain João de Melo and a force of Lascarins under Dom João of Austria (Konappu Bandara).

A few days after his coronation, Dom Filipe died under suspicious circumstances, presumably by poisoning. The Portuguese blamed Dom João of Austria, but Dom João and the Kandyan chieftains in turn accused the Portuguese of poisoning the king. Soon Kandy revolted and the Portuguese army retreated to Mannar. Dom João of Austria became the king of Kandy as Vimaladharmasuriya I.

In 1593, Sitawaka Rajasinghe attempted to retake Kandy, but his army was defeated at Balana. While returning from the battle he died from an injury caused by a bamboo splinter. On Rajasinghe's death, his general Mannamperuma Mohottila (a Vaduga mercenary leader named Aditta Kee-Vendu Perumal, who had risen in rank by winning the king's favour) deserted to the Portuguese and changed his name to Jayavira Bandara Mudali. With his assistance, the Portuguese conquered Sitawaka in 1594. During the looting of Sitawaka, Jayavira Bandara Mudali managed to secure a vast treasure, making him rich and influential.

As the Jaffna kingdom was already subjugated (since 1591), with the fall of Sitawaka only the Kingdom of Kandy stood in the way of the Portuguese completing their conquest of Sri Lanka. Although Vimaladharmasuriya ruled with the support of the inhabitants, being a son of a chieftain made him a usurper while the last legitimate heir to the throne, the princess Dona Catarina, remained with the Portuguese.

== Prelude ==
=== Planning ===
The campaign was masterminded by Francisco da Silva, captain of the fort at Colombo. His original plan was to enter Kandy with an expeditionary force in order to establish the princess Dona Catarina, then aged ten or twelve, on the Kandyan throne. Once Kandy was secured, she was expected to rule the kingdom as a vassal of the Portuguese king.

Pedro Lopes de Sousa, a highly respected fidalgo from Trancoso, happened to call at Colombo on his way to Goa from Malacca, in order to pick up provisions and fresh water. Francisco da Silva received him well at the fort, and casually broached his plan. Silva also expressed a desire to lead the expedition, citing his long experience of fighting in Ceylon. He further requested Souza to pursue the matter in Goa, in order to obtain additional troops and other resources for the expedition.

Sousa reached Goa in a few days and, as promised, he submitted the plan to the council of state. The council received the proposal enthusiastically, and unanimously approved its execution. They made three decisions, however, which were to have a crucial impact on the outcome. First, instead of appointing either Francisco da Silva or Pedro Homem Pereira, Captain-Major of Portuguese Ceylon, both of whom were veterans in warfare with the Sinhalese, the council entrusted the leadership of the expedition to Sousa. Reluctant to accept the task, Sousa made two demands on behalf of a nephew of his (name unknown): that he, instead of Pereira, be appointed Captain-Major of the Field, and that he be given Dona Catarina's hand in marriage. The council granted both requests, the latter under the condition that the marriage would be postponed until the Kingdom of Kandy was completely subjugated. They further granted Sousa the title of General Conquistador, the first ever created in Ceylon, with the administrative title of Governor and the field rank of Captain-General.

=== Preparation ===
Before the end of April 1594, a ship under Dom Bernardo Coutinho sailed in advance from Goa, with ammunition and provisions. But the ship, being old and unseaworthy, was sunk by a storm in Colombo harbor. The Portuguese managed to unload the munitions, but the other provisions were lost, leaving them with low supply reserves by the time of the campaign. (Charges were later laid against Matias de Albuquerque, viceroy of India 1591–1597, for negligence and lack of support for the expedition, holding him largely responsible for its eventual defeat.)

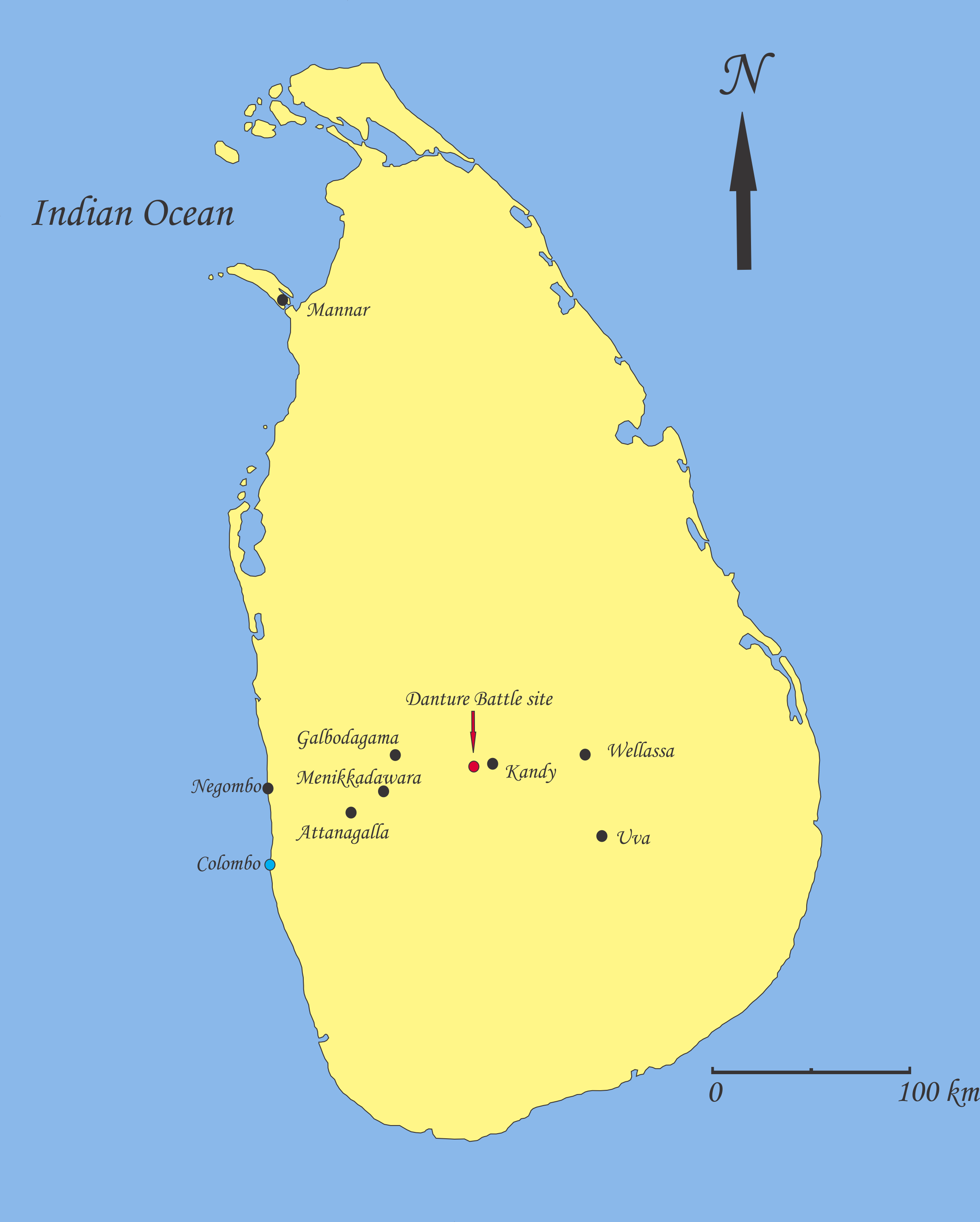
The Danture battle site and other locations important to the campaign

A fleet of eighteen ships and a galley followed the supply ship, carrying Sousa with six or seven hundred Portuguese soldiers. They were at Negombo when they encountered the storm which sank the supply ship. They were forced to anchor there and travel to Colombo over land. By the time Sousa reached Colombo, Captain Francisco da Silva had left for Mannar to command the garrison there. Instead, he found a resentful Pedro Homem Pereira, who denied assistance to the expedition in protest of the Sousas' having been preferred over him.

Sousa managed to muster a force of 800 Portuguese soldiers, including the troops brought from Goa and a hundred soldiers obtained from the Sitawaka garrison. Meanwhile, Jayavira Bandara Mudali arrived in Colombo, after his southern campaigns, with a force of 9,000 Lascarins and offered his assistance. Against the advice of veteran soldiers, Sousa made up his mind to proceed with his expedition at once, disregarding the low supply reserves and the upcoming monsoon season. He sent a message to Silva at Mannar, where Princess Dona Catarina was staying, announcing his intentions. Silva gathered a force of 200 Portuguese and 400 Lascarins in order to rendezvous with Sousa's army. As they were about to depart, the bamboo pole of Dona Catarina's royal palanquin gave way. The princess considered it a bad omen, saying "... Wada, forebear and remove me not thus, for it portends a great calamity ...". Francisco da Silva calmed her down, and after repairing the palanquin they left towards the Kandyan border, delayed by eight days.

In June 1594, the Portuguese and Lascarins (now 15,000 strong) marched out from Sitawaka. Their first stop was Attanagalla. After three days, they reached Menikkadawara, but the monsoon rains delayed them there for fourteen days. They then advanced towards Galbodagama (which stood at the site of the current-day Polgahawela railway station), burning and destroying the countryside of Seven Korale. The prince of Seven Korale, uncommitted thus far, became a Christian and declared his allegiance to the Portuguese. Leaving Seven Korale, the army camped in the vicinity of Balana Pass, gateway to the Kingdom of Kandy, to await the princess and the force from Mannar. Once these had arrived, Sousa advanced toward the pass.

== Opposing forces and the effect of terrain ==
=== Portuguese army ===
The strength of the Portuguese army amounted to 20,000 men and 47 elephants (used to carry supplies). Captain-General Pedro Lopes de Sousa was in command, with his nephew as Captain-Major of the Field. His 1000 Portuguese soldiers included 600–700 from Goa, in twenty companies; (Note: According to Queyroz, Pedro Lopez de Souza brought 600 soldiers who he claimed to be the finest in India. But in a memorandum on Sri Lankan affairs, written just fifteen years after the defeat, he states that he brought 700 soldiers from India.) 100 from Sitawaka; 200 from Mannar, in six companies; and some drawn from other garrisons. Jayavira Bandara Mudali commanded 15,400 Lascarins, comprising 15,000 from Sitawaka and Colombo and 400 from Mannar, with an unknown number of Vaduga mercenaries.

The army was supported by coolies, oxen, and transport elephants. To feed this host of 20,000 men the Portuguese had provisions sufficient only for a month, but Sousa was confident of supplying his forces from the Kandyan countryside once the territory had been secured.

=== Kandyan army ===
The Kandyan army consisted of forces raised from the five divisions of the kingdom. None of the muster rolls from this era has survived, from which to accurately determine the initial strength of the Kandyan army, but a reasonable estimate of 10,000 men has been made from studies of revenue registers.

=== Terrain and the Balana pass ===
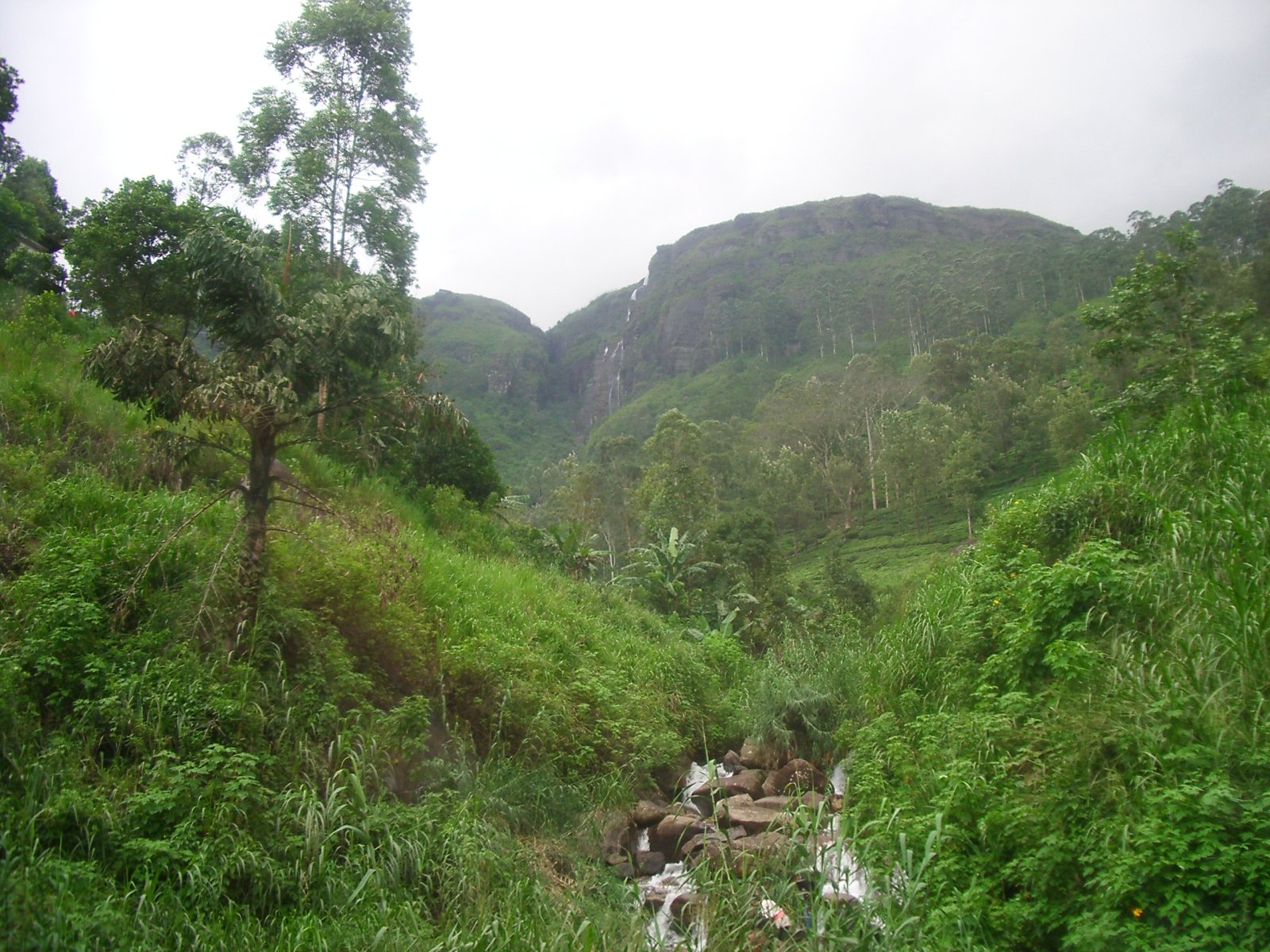
Terrain near Kandy: much of the kingdom was mountainous, thickly forested and devoid of roads; the climate was often cold, with violent winds and rains.

You look up and see on each side a mountain towering above and on each side an overhanging gloomy forest ...

— John Davy, describing the Balana pass in 1821

The Kandyan Kingdom, comprising five divisions surrounding the capital, Kandy (also known as Senkadagalapura), is situated on a plateau 1,500 feet (450 m) above sea level, largely surrounded by an impregnable mountain wall. The only access to the central plateau was through gaps in the mountains. Of these passes, the most important was the Balana pass, the one closest to Colombo, which was called "the door to the Kandy Realm". It was steep and difficult to traverse, and during wartime the usual paths were obstructed with felled trees and "elephant thorn" (Acacia tomentosa). Invading armies often required scaling ladders to climb near-perpendicular rocks. The Kandyans, using this terrain to their advantage, fortified the pass with felled trees and stockades mounted with cannon. At the summit of the Balana pass a fortalice functioned as a lookout post that could give early warning of an approaching enemy (hence the name Balana, which means "lookout"). Sentinels gave warning signals by blowing a conch shell; alarms were relayed to inland hills at Diyakelinavella and Gannoruwa.

Most of the Kandyan Kingdom was mountainous and thickly forested, inhabited by snakes and leeches. The cold, wet climate compounded the difficulties of the terrain. Invaders were forced to march in single file along narrow paths, stretching an army over long distances. The Kandyans often used these narrow paths to set up ambuscades, trapping advancing columns by suddenly felling trees to the front and rear.

== Invasion ==
=== Battle for the Balana pass ===
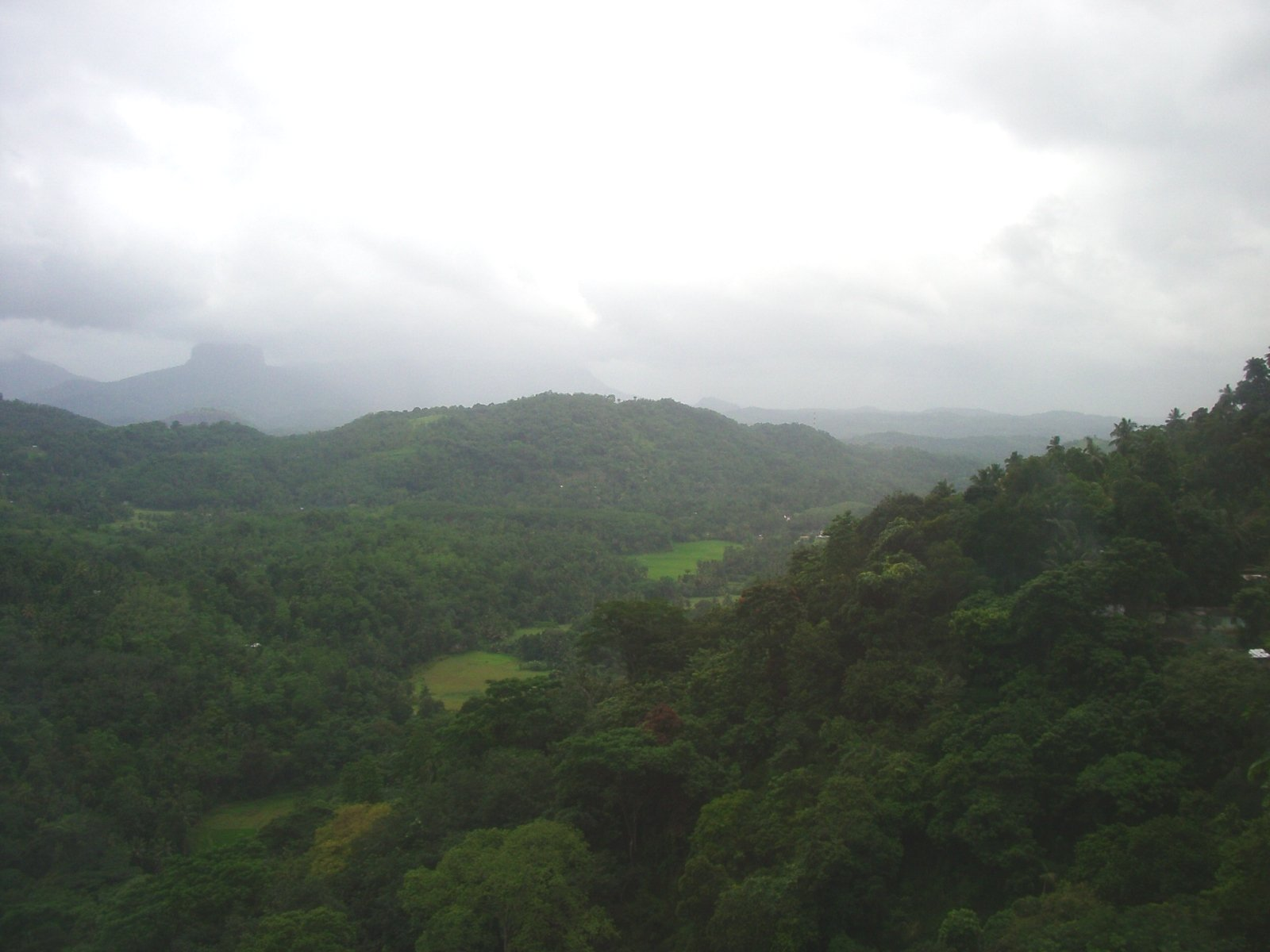
Looking down from the Balana pass

On 5 July 1594, Captain-General Pedro Lopes de Sousa began the invasion of Kandy with the battle for the Balana pass. A combined force of Portuguese and Lascarins from the advance guard mounted the assault. They were commanded by the captains Rui Dias Pinheiro, Alexandre de Abreu and Assenco Fernandes. Encountering stiff resistance at the first level of fortifications, after heavy fighting the Portuguese stormed the stockades with their battle cry, "Santiago". Pinheiro, Fernandes, fifteen other Portuguese soldiers, and many Lascarins were killed in this battle. After securing the fortifications the Portuguese continued their ascent through the pass. To their surprise the Kandyan forces began to retreat rapidly, even abandoning easily defendable positions. Veterans were concerned, but Sousa saw the retreat as evidence of Kandyan weakness and pressed the assault.

The Portuguese vanguard ascended the Balana pass, capturing stockades at every turn. Despite being separated from the main body of the army, they continued to advance and soon entered an area of relatively flat land called the Danture tract. By nightfall, they had reached Gannoruwa, where they spent the night on the western bank of the Mahaveli River—still separated from the main army, which lagged behind in order to bury the dead and because of its slow baggage train.

On the following day, the main body caught up with the advance guard, and forded the Mahaveli River at Gatambe. They entered Kandy, without encountering any resistance, to find the Royal Palace abandoned and partly burned. King Vimaladharmasuriya had retreated to Wellassa with his followers, but some of the chieftains loyal to the Gampola dynasty had remained at Kandy.

=== Coronation of Dona Catarina ===
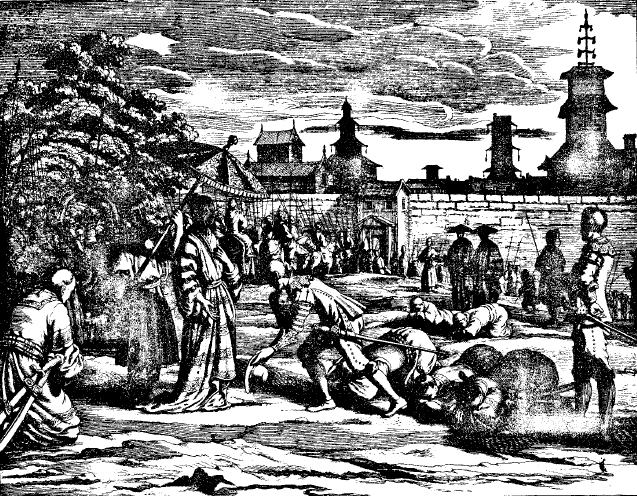
Princess Dona Catarina being welcomed to Kandy by Captain-General Pedro Lopes de Sousa with local princes and chieftains.

Sousa rapidly organized a raiding party, which consisted of a hundred Portuguese soldiers under Francisco da Silva and a large number of Lascarins under Jayavira Bandara. He sent them to Wellassa and Uva in order to capture the King. Additionally he placed a bounty of 10,000 pagodas (equal to 20,000 rixdollars) on the life of King Vimaladhrmasuriya.

Meanwhile, Dona Catarina entered Kandy in a grand procession. Captain-General Sousa, accompanied by Kandyan princes and chieftains, welcomed her at the city gates and escorted her into the Palace. Gold and silver coins were scattered in the streets for the inhabitants to gather. After three days she was crowned as Empress of Kandy in a large celebration attended by many people from the countryside, including local princes and nobles. King Vimaladharmasuriya's men used the festivities as cover to infiltrate Kandy in the night, disguised as beggars, and set fires at various locations around the city. As soon as one fire was extinguished the Portuguese found another place in flames, in a completely different direction. The fires lasted all night, as the Portuguese tried fruitlessly to apprehend the infiltrators.

Fearing a rebellion, Sousa decided to keep Empress Dona Catarina closely guarded. Kandyans were not allowed to visit her and were asked to meet Portuguese officials for state matters. Acts of lawlessness and harassment of civilians by Portuguese soldiers further complicated matters and strained the relationship between Kandyans and Portuguese.

... Portugesche troops, they grew insolent and troublesome and committed various acts of depredation, such as plundering their [Kandyans'] property, ravishing their women and killing their children and those who opposed their will, and also setting fire to several of their villages ...

— Phillipus Baldaeus

Soon the Kandyans realized that the Portuguese were not the liberators they claimed to be. Rumors that the Empress was to marry a Portuguese convinced some to join King Vimaladharmasuriya; the Portuguese gradually lost the support of the Kandyan chieftains and population.

=== Plans for Dona Catarina's marriage ===
Francisco da Silva and Jayavira Bandara Mudali met little resistance in Wellassa and Uva. Although they failed to capture King Vimaladharmasuriya, they did manage to take the Prince of Uva, who was King Vimaladharmasuriya's uncle. They brought him back to Kandy, where he was later publicly executed—over Jayavira's objections.

For reasons unknown, Sousa changed his earlier plans and offered the empress's hand in marriage to the Captain Francisco da Silva, who was considered by his men to be the "most good looking man in Portuguese Asia". But he refused the honor, and with Sousa's permission returned to Mannar with several soldiers from his company. (He died soon after, shipwrecked at Kaffraria on his way back to Lisbon.)

After Silva's departure, Jayavira Bandara Mudali approached Pedro Lopes de Sousa and requested permission to let the empress marry his brother-in-law. (According to Baldaeus, Jayavira himself asked for permission to marry the empress.) But the Captain-General refused the proposal, saying he was unable to give consent without obtaining the prior approval of the emperor. He also raised the matter of Jayavira's not being of noble birth. Disappointed, Jayavira expressed his dissatisfaction: "... you who are but a stranger have with my assistance accomplished all your schemes of ambition and now endeavor to trample me underfoot ..." But they ended their conversation on good terms, Sousa agreeing to consider the proposal on his return to Colombo.

=== Logistical problems and guerrilla attacks ===
With growing support from the country's inhabitants, the Kandyans prevented Portuguese supply caravans from reaching Kandy. Desperate for food, the Portuguese soon began to scour the countryside. Kandyans frequently ambushed these foraging parties and cut down the stragglers. So Pedro Lopes de Sousa decided to organize a large raiding party instead of small foraging groups, and Jayavira Bandara persuaded him to send out Luís Moro Mudali, with a force of 3000 men, to the Principality of Uva.

On the fourth day of the raid, men of Uva ambushed the party, annihilating it and capturing Luís Moro Mudali. He was executed on orders from King Vimaladharmasuriya, to Sousa's great grief. Jayavira Bandara requested permission to invade Uva in order to avenge his death, but Sousa decided to remain at Kandy. Since Luís Moro Mudali was known to be more devoted to the Portuguese than to Jayavira, the ambush raised suspicions of treachery on Jayavira's part.

Encouraged by the success at Uva, the Kandyans grew bolder. They infiltrated nearby hills and raised battle cries at night in order to demoralize the enemy. A body of 150 Portuguese under Francisco de Brito and 300 Lascarins under Pedro Afonso were sent to drive them away. Leaving without a guide they soon got lost, and wandered in the hills for almost two days. On the third day, they sent a detachment of Lascarins to find the way back to the camp. The Lascarins surprised a group of Kandyans, whom they killed; some of them were identified as household servants of Jayavira Bandara Mudali.

On further inspection, they found a present of inlaid firelocks, velvet and jewels, with a message containing information on the strengths of Brito and Afonso's forces and a request to attack them. The Captain-General's routine of visiting a tower for recreational activities, accompanied by just a few guards, was also described. (Queiroz says there was a promise to assassinate the General in this letter, but according to Baldaeus this was added by the Portuguese in order to justify their later actions.)

These items of evidence were secretly brought back to the camp and presented to the war council, which concluded that they had been sent by Jayavira Bandara Mudali to the Kandyan king. Pedro Afonso Mudali declared that he had previously intercepted messages of similar nature, supposedly sent by King Vimaladharmasuriya to Jayavira Bandara, promising him the kingdoms of Sitawaka and Kotte if he rose against the Portuguese. A Franciscan priest further disclosed a confession made by a Badaga mercenary, who happened to be a relative of Jayavira's, regarding an impending betrayal. The council was divided in their opinion, but Sousa decided to wait until they returned to Colombo to hold an inquiry, as it would be dangerous to seize Jayavira in the middle of the campaign.

=== Forged letter and the death of Jayavira ===
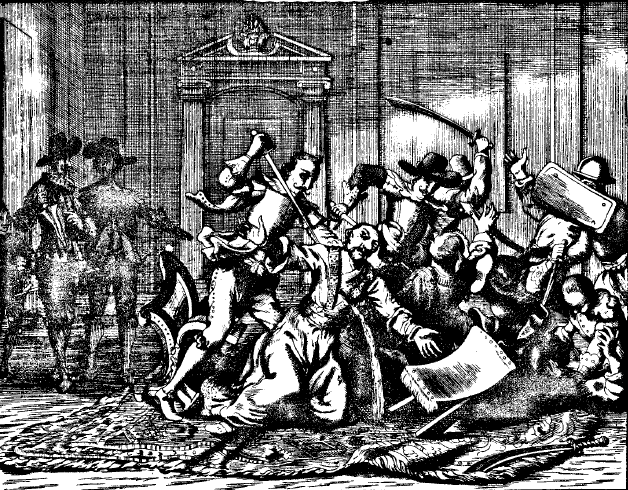
Portuguese, led by António Barbosa the Draque, Francisco de Brito and Francisco Dalium, killing Jayavira Bandara Mudali, his brother-in-law and his guards

Meanwhile, King Vimaladharmasuriya devised a plan to drive a wedge between the Lascarins and the Portuguese. The local chronicle Rajavaliya and Captain Ribeiro both confirm its existence. A letter was forged, purporting to be written by Jayavira Bandara Mudali to King Vimaladharmasuriya. The king entrusted the letter to a carefully chosen, loyal Kandyan and instructed him:

... Do not try to avoid them (Portuguese), but as soon as you meet their scouts, let them see you and immediately flee into the forest and there pretend to fall, so that they may seize and take you to their General; and always appear as if you were anxious to hide this ola (letter)—and this is the sole object of your errand—so that it may reach their general's hands ...

The Kandyan spy succeeded in his mission and the letter was brought to the General. It contained a message to King Vimaladharmasuriya requesting that he attack Kandy on the following night, when Jayavira Bandara's men would set fire to a part of the Portuguese camp. It also indicated that Jayavira had a group of mercenaries disguised as yogis, who would attack the Portuguese from within during the assault. The Captain-General alerted his men and appointed extra patrols to guard the compound, but on the following night the Portuguese waited for an attack that never came. Sousa even claimed to have seen signals from the Kandyans, just as suggested in the letter. Convinced that the letter was genuine, Sousa went to Jayavira's house to confront him, accompanied by his captains. Jayavira denied all the allegations as fabrications of his enemies, but requested to be held under guard until an inquiry could be convened. Sousa was inclined to agree, but his captains D. Gastão Coutinho, António Barbosa the Draque, Francisco de Brito and Francisco Dalium saw it as a stalling tactic that would allow Jayavira to alert his men. The latter three fell on him with daggers and killed him, along with his brother-in-law and household guards.

Other Portuguese soldiers also joined the affray, and about fifty Badaga mercenaries were killed during the night. Meanwhile, Jayavira's house was looted, and the Portuguese found there 14 paras (about 9 bushels) of gold coins and gems, with letters indicating locations of other hidden treasures. These were secured by the order of General; among them was the far-famed "Washerman’s Stone". (It is believed that this gem was presented to King Sitawaka Rajasinghe by Mutukon Sinha Vidane Henaya from the caste of washers and, as documented in an undated manuscript at Sabaragamu Saman Dewale, it was equal in size to a wild cucumber or kekiri fruit.)

== Retreat ==
=== Mass desertions ===
Soon word of Jayavira's murder spread through the Lascarin camp. Shouts of Rajadore Jayavire marapue! ("King Jayavira is murdered!") echoed from all directions and many Lascarins fled in panic to the Kandyans, along with the remaining Badaga mercenaries. By the morning of the following day most of the Lascarins, excepting those from Colombo and Mannar, had deserted.

Morale was low in the Portuguese camp as the gravity of the situation became apparent. Even those captains who had demanded Jayavira's death now blamed Sousa for not having seized him for return to Colombo. The Captain-General appointed Panikki Mudali, a Sitawakan chieftain who had twice defected to the Portuguese during the lowland campaign, to command the remaining Lascarins, less than a thousand in number.

Adding to their problems, the Portuguese were running out of provisions. As all Kandy was now in rebellion, nobody was willing to sell them any. Even if they managed to get a message through to Colombo, they could not expect resupply from that quarter: Pedro Homem Pereira did not have enough soldiers to escort a caravan, even if he was willing to cooperate. Goa was too far away; with the remaining supplies they could not expect to hold Kandy until help arrived.

In order to keep the remaining Lascarins content, Sousa paid them on the spot, and again after a few days, on 4 October 1594. But after receiving this payment, all but three hundred deserted. Unable to hold Kandy with his remaining forces, the Captain-General decided to fall back to the fortalice at Balana, expecting to keep it until reinforcement should arrive from Colombo or Goa.

=== Ambush at Halloluwa ===
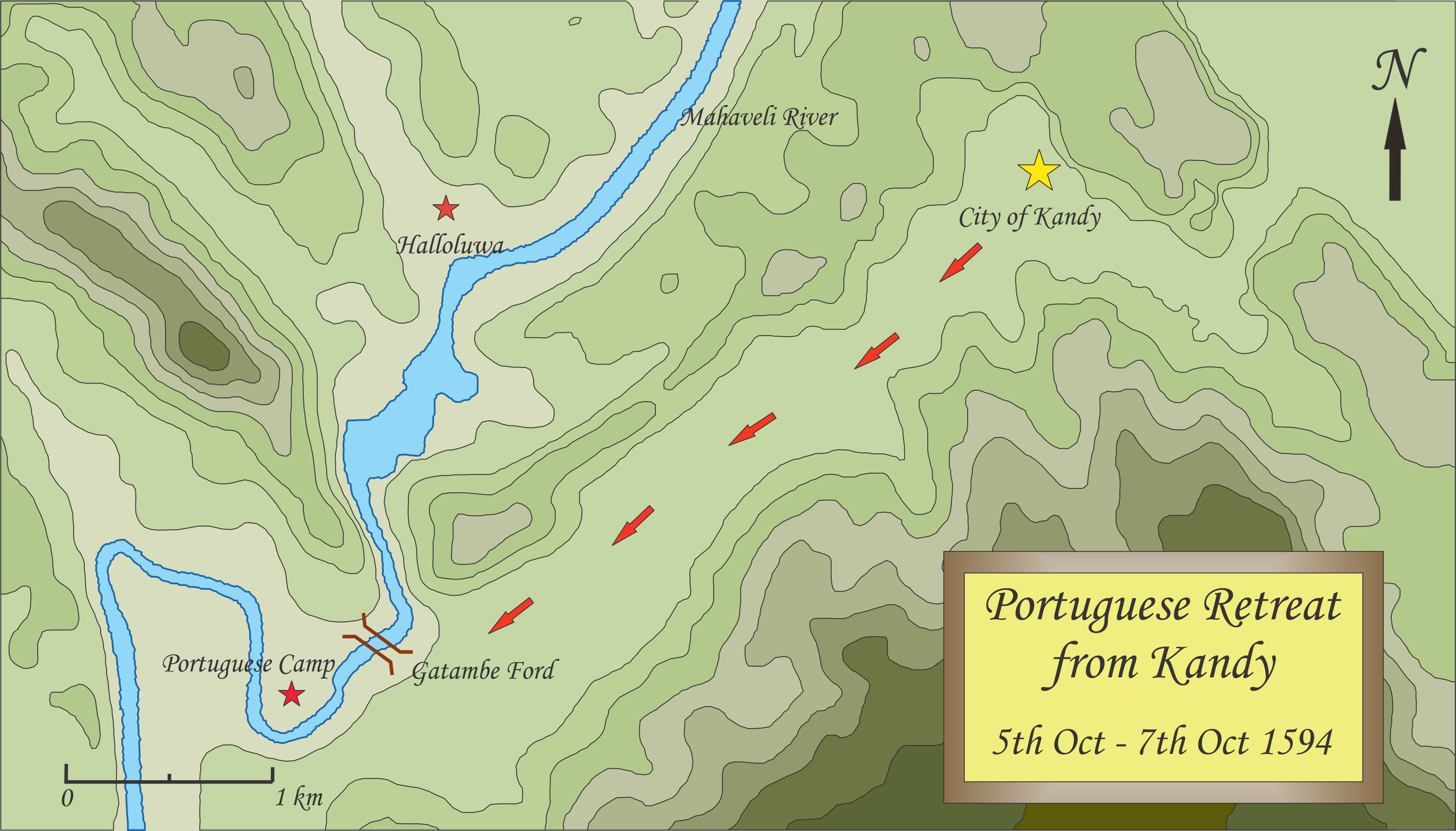
The route taken by the Portuguese on 5 October 1594 is shown with red arrows. Halloluwa village is located several kilometers north of the Portuguese camp, on the west bank of the Mahaveli River.

On 5 October 1594, the Portuguese abandoned Kandy, and with the Empress they began their retreat towards the Balana fortalice. The remaining few supplies, Jayavira's treasure and the ammunition reserves were loaded on elephants. Their first day's march was uneventful: they forded the Mahaveli River at Gatambe and made their camp at Gannoruwa. On the following day, for reasons unknown, the Portuguese army remained at Gannoruwa instead of recommencing the retreat.

On 7 October, the food supplies ran out. In a last-ditch attempt to replenish themselves before retiring to the Balana fortalice; the Portuguese sent a raiding party to the village of Halloluwa, on the west bank of the Mahaveli River, several kilometers north of the encampment. This force consisted of 150 Portuguese soldiers under António Barbosa the Draque, Francisco Correia, and Álvaro de Sousa, with the 300 Lascarins under Pedro Afonso Mudali and Miguel Monteiro Mudali.

They successfully raided the village and managed to capture a large quantity of rice. Not being content with this, they wasted time plundering the village and setting fire to the temples and houses. This provided the Kandyans, numbering some 7000, with an opportunity to set up an ambush, cutting down trees to block the return route. The Portuguese, already exhausted by days of fighting, were forced to fight for each step along rough paths through thick forests. One by one they fell. Captain Álvaro de Souza and a few Lascarins managed to escape and brought the news of the defeat to the Portuguese camp.

=== Battle of Danture ===
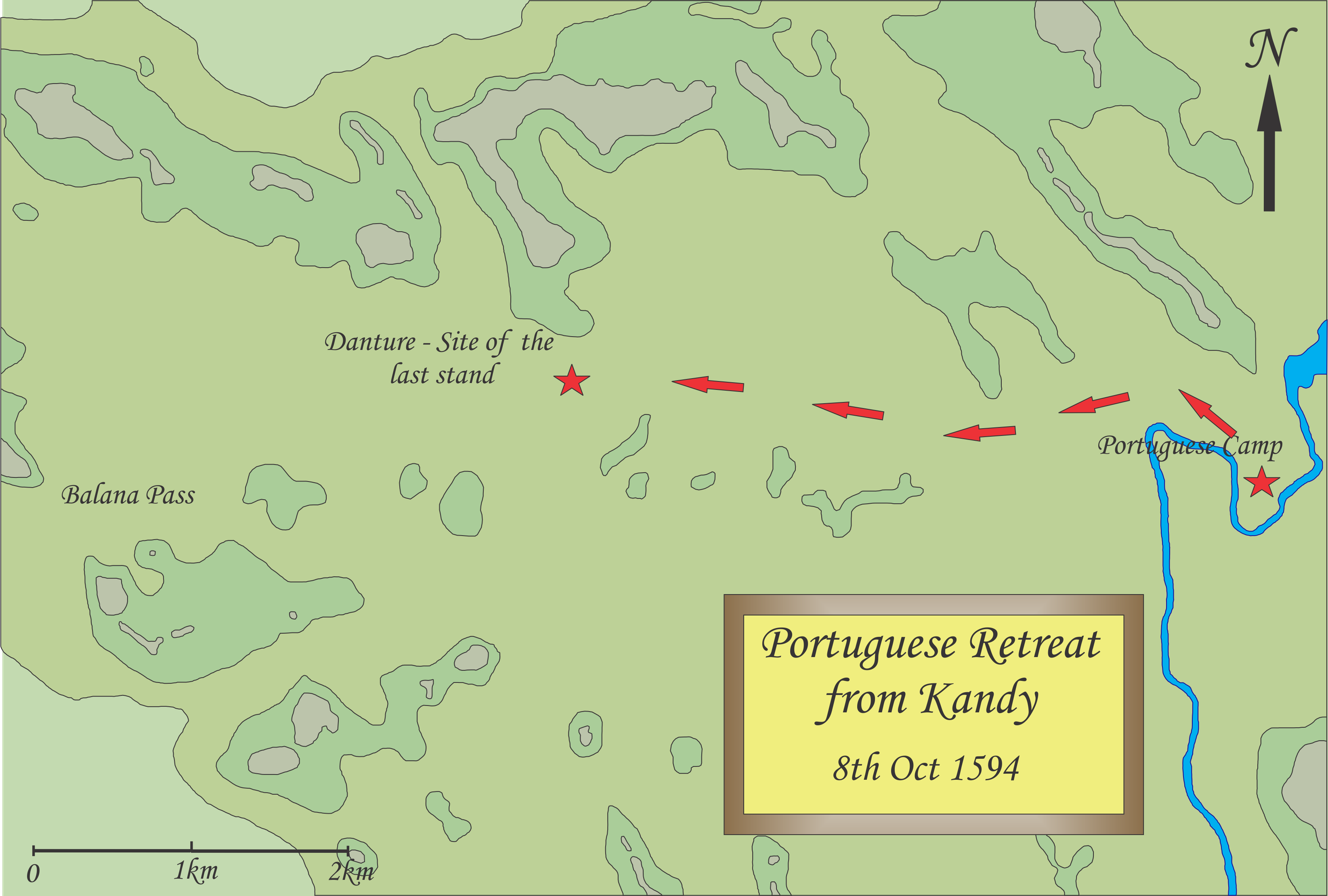
The route taken by the Portuguese columns during the fighting retreat on 8 October 1594. They made their last stand on a hilltop at Danture.

At dawn on 8 October, after receiving the sacraments of confession and communion, the Portuguese prepared themselves for the retreat. The remaining 368 Portuguese, with a few Lascarins, formed themselves into three equal columns. D. Gastão Coutinho led the first column as a vanguard. With the second column came Empress Dona Catarina, mounted on an elephant, and the Captain-General's small son, Diogo Lopes de Sousa. Other transport elephants bearing munitions and the treasure of Jayavira Bandara were in this column as well. The rearguard was led by Pedro Lopes de Sousa himself. The Captain-General made a speech to boost the morale of his men, calling upon their loyalty and honor. Then, after worshiping the crucifix held by the Jesuit priest Father António Esquipano, they began their march towards the Balana fortalice.

Strengthened by defecting Lascarins and men from all regions of Kandy Kingdom, King Vimaladharmasuriya's army now numbered somewhere between ten and twenty thousand. He sent a small body of men to cut down trees in order to block the narrow, winding path to Balana known as the Danture tract. He then sent an army under Ekanayake Mudali to occupy Balana and cut off the Portuguese retreat. Determined to avoid an engagement in the open, he waited for the Portuguese columns to leave the Gannoruwa plain. Once they entered the Danture tract he surrounded them.

At seven in the morning the Kandyans appeared, covering the slopes that lined the Danture tract. They waited for the Portuguese to come within range, then opened fire with muskets, gingals, arrows and medium-sized cannons. The brunt of the attack fell on the advance guard; its commander, D. Gastão Coutinho, and several captains including Simão Pereira and Francisco de Brito were killed. This attack slowed the retreat, and the columns came to a halt. The forest concealed the Kandyans, who were able to cause casualties while remaining largely unseen. So the Portuguese decided to charge the enemy in front of them, in order to clear a path.

This charge was successful and the Kandyans were driven off, allowing the columns to resume their retreat. The fighting soon evolved into a march-and-fight battle. The Portuguese repeatedly repulsed Kandyan missile attacks by charging and dispersing the enemy, using the resulting lull to advance until the Kandyans returned. Although slow, and costly in terms of casualties, this tactic allowed the Portuguese to retreat halfway to Balana. As a result of the running battle, the Portuguese columns gradually became disorganized, reducing the formations to a long straggling line.

=== Last stand ===
Now the Kandyans concentrated their attack on the middle column. After heavy fightingl they were repulsed but this took some time during which the middle column became separated from the vanguard, who were continuing their running battle. In the confusion the elephants carrying Dona Catarina and other valuables, including the ammunition reserves, left the column and wandered into the forest. Meanwhile, the advance guard, now proceeding without a guide, took a wrong turn and stumbled into a marshy field. Here the Kandyans surrounded and overwhelmed them. Following them in, the second column mounted a better resistance, managing to hold out for three hours, but they were eventually annihilated after their captains Henrique Pinto and Diogo Borges were killed.

With the destruction of the first two columns, only the rearguard under Pedro Lopes de Sousa remained as an effective fighting force. Leaving the path to avoid the marsh, the Captain-General advanced up a slope and occupied a hilltop. Here the Portuguese made their last stand. Since the ammunition reserves had been lost with the elephants, they soon ran out of gunpowder. But they continued to fight with spears until nightfall, when darkness brought a lull to the fighting.

=== Surrender ===
Only 93 Portuguese remained, and almost all of them were wounded. Sousa himself had suffered two critical wounds and six minor ones. They had been fighting without food since the morning of the 7th. Exhausted and demoralized, they surrendered to the Kandyans in the morning of 9 October 1594. Meanwhile, Ekanayake Mudali's men came across the elephant carrying the empress Dona Catarina. She and the Captain-General's small son were brought to King Vimaladharmasuriya, who granted them protection.

In a departure from the normal post-battle conduct of Sinhala troops, the Portuguese soldiers were subjected to torture and mutilation. Both Portuguese and local sources provide vivid details of the brutality inflicted on the captives. Their noses, ears and sometimes even their privy parts were cut off. Not even the Captain-General or the military chaplains were spared. This deviation from traditional chivalry has not been fully explained. "In revenge for the atrocities of Portuguese", "as a warning to others" and "simply in rage and to humiliate" are some of the reasons given in various sources. Notably a provision within the Kandyan Convention later stated that: "All forms of physical torture and mutilations are abolished."

At Dona Catarina's request, the wounded Captain-General was nursed and treated well by King Vimaladharmasuriya. But three days later he succumbed to his injuries, after entrusting his small son to the King. (Diogo Lopes was sent back to Colombo three years later, in fulfillment of the King's promise.) There were five Portuguese captains among the captives: Francisco Pereira Deca, the brothers Vicente and Luís Sobrinho, Filipe Toscano, and Rui Deca. The latter two were executed during their captivity. Of the priests who were among the prisoners—three Franciscans and one Jesuit—two were released later. Enough of another group of captives were blinded so as to leave only one eye for each five men, and these were sent back to Colombo holding one another by the hand. The rest were forced to build fortifications, which were to be tested in the Campaign of Balana from 1602 to 1603.

Not all who fought with the Portuguese underwent harsh treatment. Manuel Dias, the Captain-General's footboy, joined the service of King Vimaladharmasuriya. He served as a double agent for the Kandyans (notably in an assassination attempt against King Vimaladharmasuriya in 1602), giving up his opportunity to be crowned and later rose to the rank of Maha Mudali.

== Casualties ==
Except for the handful that escaped or returned to Mannar with Captain Francisco, all of the 1000 Portuguese soldiers were killed or captured. In addition to the soldiers, six Franciscan priests died in the battle, including Fr. Simão de Liz and Fr. Manuel Pereira who were killed in the last stand. Only three soldiers are known to have escaped from the Battle of Danture.

The captive Francisco Correia managed to escape through the forest with some Lascarins from Colombo. Pedro Veloso, a native of Amarante, was wounded and left to die with his nose cut off. He was found by his friend Domingos Carvalho, a native of Vila Real, who carried Veloso back to friendly territory on his back. Domingos was promoted to captain and later became the Dissawe (an administrative title) of Matara. Pedro Veloso became the first Captain appointed by the King of Portugal to the newly built fort at Galle, Santa Cruz de Gale.

The exact numbers of Lascarin and Kandyan casualties are not known. Although Fernão de Queiroz states that the Kandyans lost 5,000 men (5% of the entire Kandyan population) during the fight on 8 October alone, However, according to Channa W'singhe: "The Kandyan preference for long-range attacks from hidden positions, and their reluctance to engage in melee without assurance of victory, limited the casualties they suffered as well as those they could inflict."

== Aftermath ==
Soon after the battle, King Vimaladharmasuriya married Dona Catarina with a festival that lasted for 110 days. He also granted lands, offices and titles to warriors who had distinguished themselves in the campaign. He began to reinforce the Balana pass with three new forts, which were to prove their effectiveness during the Balana Campaign in 1602.

=== Political consequences ===
Just before the Campaign of Danture, Kandy was a politically unstable state, ruled by a usurper with insignificant military power. After the battle, with his marriage to Dona Catarina, Vimaladharmasuriya's claim to the throne was secured and marked the beginning of a new dynasty. The victory at Danture saved Kandy from subjugation by the Portuguese at a time when they had already conquered the rest of Sri Lanka; it remained an independent state till 1815, effectively resisting the Portuguese, Dutch, and British.

=== Military consequences ===
The tactics the Kandyans used in this campaign served as a model for their future repeated successes against three major European powers. They had captured as spoils of war a large stock of Portuguese weapons and the treasure of Jayavira, further strengthening Kandy's arsenal and its treasury.

This was the first time that a Portuguese army had been so completely defeated during their military operations in Sri Lanka. The Portuguese were determined to avenge the Kandyan victory, and in 1602, after many years of preparation, another army was to invade Kandy, under Dom Jerónimo de Azevedo. However, the Kandyans would defeat them at Balana, leading to a desperate retreat across the country. After this setback, the Portuguese dropped any plans of capturing Kandy intact and Dom Jerónimo instead switched to a systematic campaign of raids, twice every year, using smaller detachments of troops, aimed at crops, cattle and villages, that ravaged Kandy in the coming years.

== Bibliography ==
- B. Gunasekara, The Rajavaliya. AES reprint. New Delhi: Asian Educational Services, 1995. ISBN 81-206-1029-6
- C. Gaston Perera, Kandy fights the Portuguese – a military history of Kandyan resistance. Vijithayapa Publications: Sri Lanka, June 2007. ISBN 978-955-1266-77-6
- Captain Joao Ribeiro, The historic tragedy of the island of Ceilao. AES Reprint. New Delhi: Asian Educational Services, 1999. ISBN 81-206-1334-1
- Channa Wickramasinghe, Kandy at war: indigenous military resistance to European expansion in Sri Lanka 1594–1818. Vilithayapa Publications: Sri Lanka, 2004. ISBN 955-8095-52-4
- Fernao de Queyroz, The temporal and spiritual conquest of Ceylon. (SG Perera, Trans.) AES reprint. New Delhi: Asian Educational Services; 1995. ISBN 81-206-0764-3
- Paul E. Peiris, Ceylon the Portuguese Era: being a history of the island for the period, 1505–1658, Volume 1. Tisara Publishers Ltd.: Sri Lanka, 1992.OCLC 12552979
- Phillipus Baldaeus, "A True and Exact Description of the Great Island of Ceylon", The Ceylon Historical Journal, Volume III, No 1–4. Published in co-operation with the Ceylon Branch of the Royal Asiatic Society, July 1958 to April 1959.
- S. G. Perera, A history of Ceylon for schools – The Portuguese and Dutch period. The Associated Newspapers of Ceylon Ltd.: Sri Lanka, 1942.OCLC 10531673
