= Vimaladharmasuriya II =

King of Kandy from 1687 to 1707

Vimaladharmasurya II දෙවන විමලධර්මසූරිය
- Thrisinhaladheeshwara; Lankeshwara; Bhupathi

King of Kandy
- Reign: 7 December 1687 – 4 June 1707
- Coronation: 28 June 1688
- Predecessor: Rajasinghe II
- Successor: Vira Narendra Sinha
- Born: Kingdom of Kandy
- Died: 4 June 1707; Kingdom of Kandy
- Burial: Royal Cremation Yard, Asgiri Temple, Kandy, Sri Lanka
- Spouse: Queen Consort of Madurai Royal Consort (Rididoli); Muthukude Devi Royal Consort (Yakadadoli); Kirawelle Devi
- Issue: Vira Narendra Sinha; Prince Pattiya Bandara
- Father: Rajasinghe II
- Mother: Queen Consort of Rajasinghe II
- Religion: Theravada Buddhism

Vimaladharmasurya II (Sinhala:දෙවන විමලධර්මසූරිය), (ruled 1687–1707) was a peaceful king of Kandy who succeeded his father, Rajasinghe II, on December 7, 1687.

== Childhood ==
During his childhood, Lord Ambanwela Rala, who was a member of the royal court from a noble Kandyan family led a rebellion against Rajasinghe II. Rebels tried to use Crown Prince Vimaladharmasuriya against his father. But his paternal half-aunt Sama Devi, who held the position of "Mother Queen" at that time was rescued him from rebels and taken to the king. Rajasinghe II hide him to save from the rebels. So Vimaladharmasuriya was brought up by a bhikku for a long period in his childhood.

King Vimaladharmasurya II was naturally of peaceful temperament. During his childhood though, a sufficient number of Buddhist priests were not able to conduct the higher ordination (Upasampadā) ceremony.

== Ascension ==
In 1687, Rajasinghe II realized that his reign was nearing its end. He convened a gathering of his ministers at Hanguranketa Place and introduced them to his son, Prince Mahastana, who was destined to succeed him on the throne. Although surprised, the ministers did not express any doubt. It is said that Rajasinghe II humbly knelt before his son, pledging his loyalty, before the ministers officially recognized Prince Mahastana as the new king.

On December 10, two ambassadors arrived in Colombo to inform the Dutch authorities that Prince Mahastana had ascended to the throne of Kandy. This news brought immense joy, leading to widespread celebrations and acts of clemency such as the release of slaves and the pardoning of criminals. Five days later, additional ambassadors arrived in Colombo to deliver the somber news of Rajasinghe II's passing and subsequent cremation. They also conveyed Rajasinghe II's final wish for his son to maintain friendly relations with Laurens van Pyl, the 12th Governor of Dutch Ceylon.

== Marriages ==
Vimaladharmasuriya II, following in his father's footsteps, maintained the connection with Madurai Nayak clan through marriage. As documented in the Cūḷavaṃsa, he wedded the daughter of his father's queen consort and appointed her as his queen.

Not only his Queen Consort but also he had several Royal Concubines from Nayakkar clan. But none of those consorts were able to produce an heir to the throne.

So he married a princess from a local noble family who lived in the Muthukude Walawwa at Wattegama. This Royal Concubine was called as Muthukude Devi. She could able to give birth to a son, who later became king's successor Vira Narendra Sinha

And also according to historical sources he had a concubine from Kirawelle royal clan, who was the mother of king's another son Pattiya Bandara.

== Contributions to Buddhism in Sri Lanka ==
He invited 33 monks from Burma and established the higher ordination that helped protect Buddhism.

== The Dutch ==
During the reign of King Vimaladharmasurya II, many attempts made by the Dutch to capture the Kandyan Kingdom had failed. However the Dutch gained control of the Kandyan Kingdom's foreign trade. He allowed Joseph Vaz to settle in his kingdom and allowed him to preach the Christian faith.

== Relations with Daud Khan Panni ==
In the year 1703, the Mughal commander at Coromandel, Daud Khan Panni spent 10,500 coins to purchase 30 to 50 War elephants from Ceylon. These purchases were acknowledged by Vimaladharmasurya II of Kandy.

== See also ==
- Mahavamsa
- List of monarchs of Sri Lanka
- History of Sri Lanka

== Sources ==
- Kings & Rulers of Sri Lanka

Vimaladharmasuriya II Konnapu Bandara Born: ? ? Died: 4 June 1707
Regnal titles
| Preceded by Râjasimha II | King of Kandy; 1687–4 June 1707 | Succeeded by Vira Narendra Sinha |
