= Senasammata Vikramabahu =

King of Kandy from 1469 to 1511

Sēnasammata Vikramabāhu සේනාසම්මත වික්‍රමබාහු
- 1st King of Kandy

King of Kandy
- Reign: 1469–1511
- Predecessor: kingdom established Parakramabahu VI as King of Kotte
- Successor: Jayavira Bandara
- Spouse: Mayurawathi of Gampola
- Issue: Jayavira Bandara
- House: House of Siri Sanga Bo
- Mother: Queen Chandrawathi

Sēnasammata Vikramabāhu (Note: Sēnasammata was a hitherto used title.) was King of Kandy from 1469 to 1511. Before becoming independent the provinces that made up the Kingdom of Kandy belonged to the Kingdom of Kotte. Vikramabāhu founded the city of Kandy, and during the reign of Parakramabahu VI, Kandy became a separate entity seceding from Kotte. He was from the House of Siri Sanga Bo and reigned for four decades, setting an example of longevity and stability for the new kingdom. His son Jayavira Bandara was his successor.

== See also ==
- List of Sri Lankan monarchs

== Notes ==
Senasammata Vikramabahu House of Siri Sanga Bo Died: ? 1511
Regnal titles
Preceded by	King of Kandy; 1469–1511	Succeeded by Jayavira Bandara
