= Rajasinha II =

King of Kandy from 1635 to 1687

Rajasinghe II දෙවන රාජසිංහ
- Thrisinhaladisuwara; Lankeshwara; Bhupathi; Imperador of Ceylon
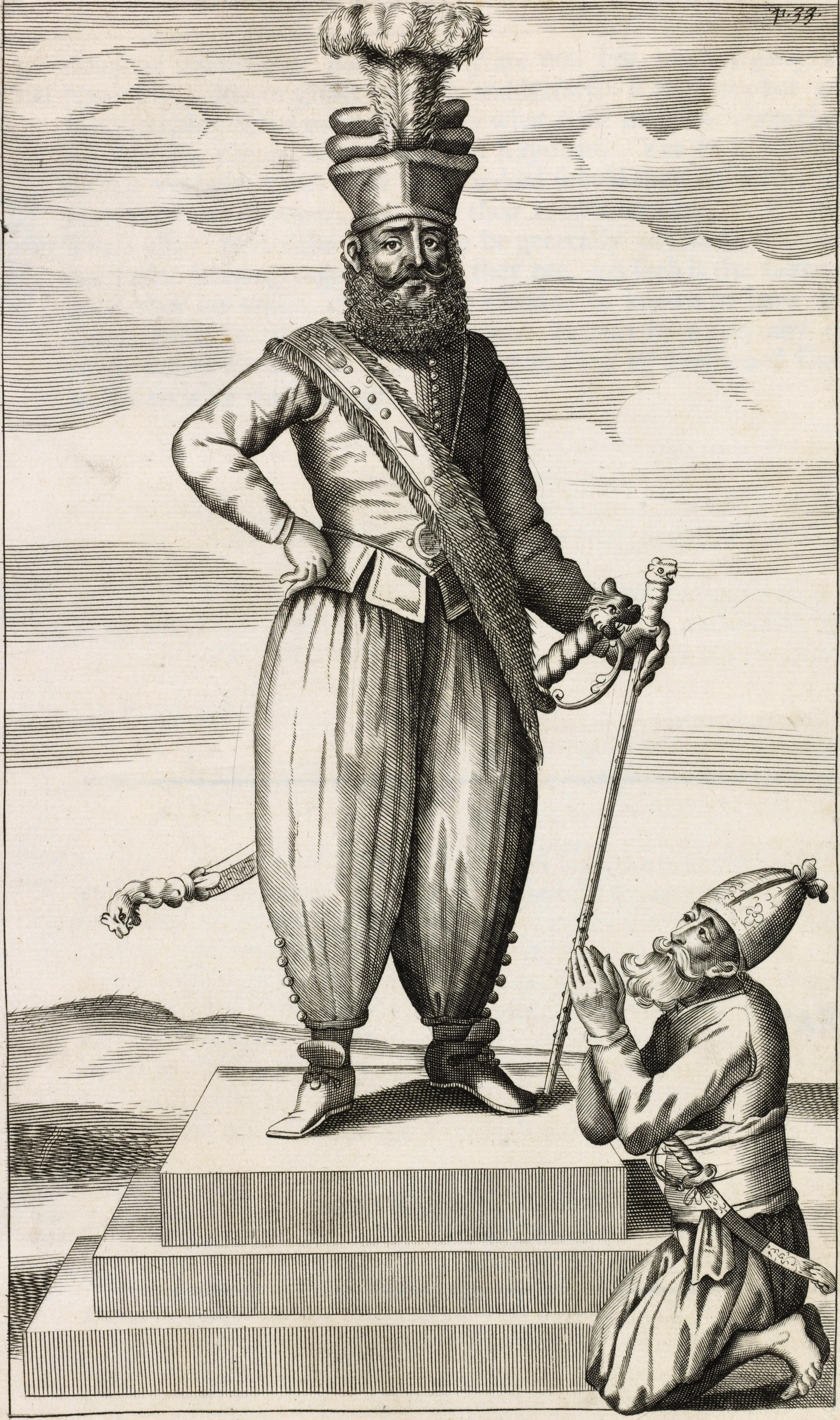
- Rajasingha II, from Robert Knox's A Historical Relation of the Island Ceylon, 1693

King of Kandy
- Reign: 1635 – 6 December 1687
- Coronation: 1635
- Predecessor: Senarat
- Successor: Vimaladharmasurya II

Regent of Kandy
- Tenure: 1628 – 1635
- Monarch: Senarat
- Born: c. 1608; Aluthnuwara Palace, Mawanella, Sri Lanka
- Died: 6 December 1687; Hanguranketha Palace, Sri Lanka
- Burial: Royal Garden of Hanguranketha, Sri Lanka later; Royal Cremation Yard, Asgiri Temple, Kandy, Sri Lanka.
- Spouse: A princess from Madurai
- Issue: Vimaladharmasurya II
- Father: Senarat
- Mother: Dona Catherina of Kandy
- Religion: Theravada Buddhism

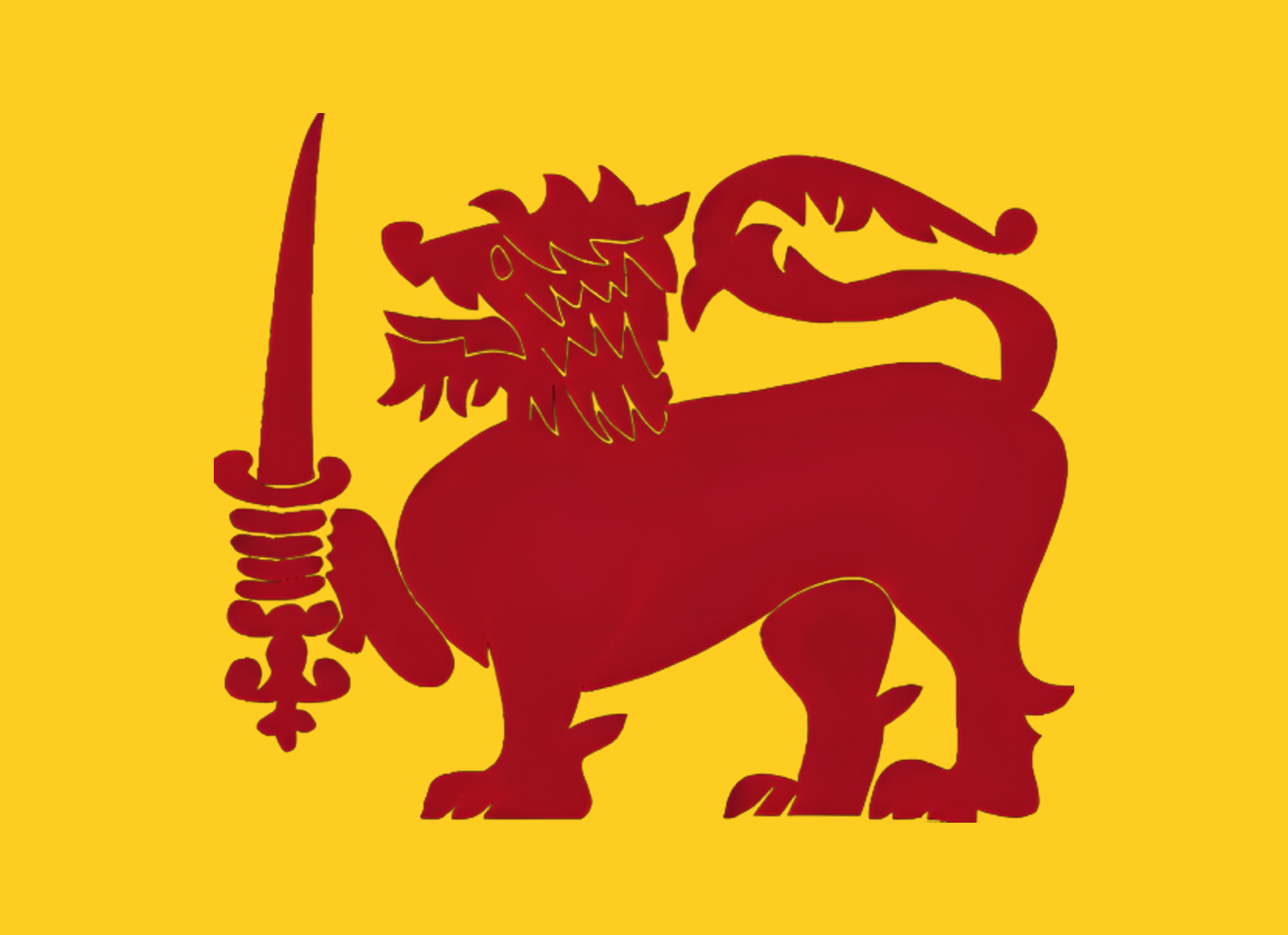
Reconstructed emblem (device) of Rajasinghe II featuring a Red Lion on a gold ground.

King Rajasinghe II (Sinhala: දෙවන රාජසිංහ, romanized: Dewana Rajasingha), also known as Rajasingha II (pre coronation, Prince Dewa Astana/Dewarajasinghe), was a Sinhalese King, reigned 1629 – 6 December 1687; seventh king of the Kingdom of Kandy in Sri Lanka. Rajasingha requested aid from the newly formed Dutch East India Company to help expel the Portuguese from the island, which they successfully did in 1656. By this time however it had become clear to the Kandyans that the Dutch not only intended to expel the Portuguese but to replace them as the major colonial power on the island. This transfer of power is also believed to be where the Sinhala idiom / figure of speech “ඉඟුරු දී මිරිස් ගත්තා වාගේ” Inguru di miris gaththa wagay (literal meaning: Like one exchanged ginger for chili) originated - in reference that the Dutch rule was much more of a menace to the king and cruel to the people in the island than the Portuguese's. From 1645 onwards Rajasingha was engaged in sporadic warfare with his erstwhile allies.

== Birth and early life ==
Rajasingha II also known as Prince Maha Asthana in his childhood, was the son of Senarat (Senarath), the second ruler of the kingdom of Kandy, based at the city of Senkadagala (modern Kandy) in Sri Lanka's mountainous interior. Since the Portuguese annexation of much of Sri Lanka's coastal areas the kingdom had represented the sole independent native polity on the island. Near incessant warfare had significantly embittered the Kandyans towards the Portuguese; furthermore the brief success of the warlike kingdom of Sitawaka a century earlier had convinced many in the kingdom that the total expulsion of the colonial power was a distinct possibility.

As a young man Rajasingha participated in the 1612 counteroffensive that routed a Portuguese invasion into Kandyan territory.

Rajasingha succeeded his father to the throne in 1634 (1629 in some sources)

== Early reign: arrival of the Dutch ==
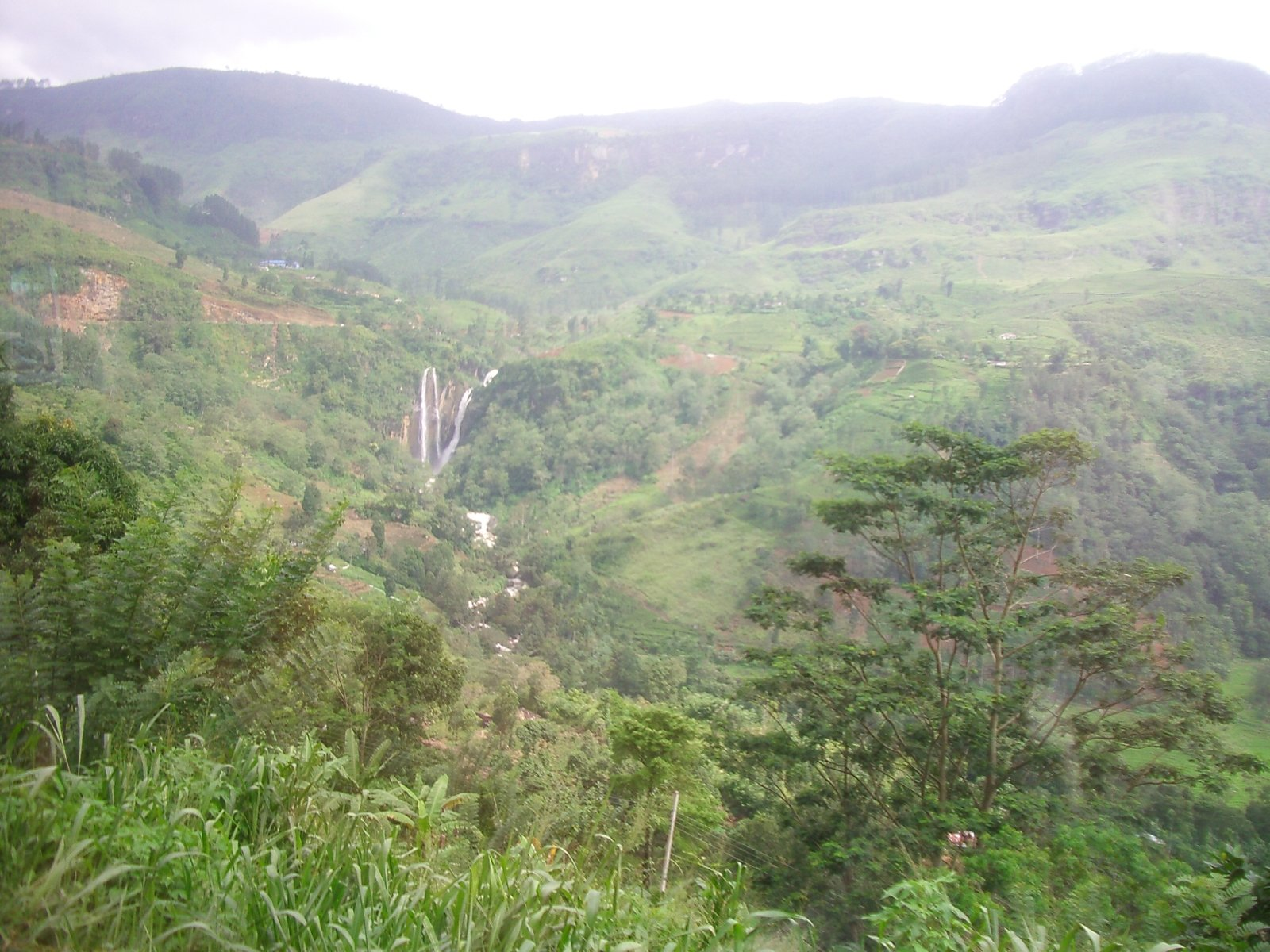
The rugged terrain of the Kandyan kingdom, an area now largely within the modern Central Province

Rajasingha's father had long courted the Dutch as a potential ally against the Portuguese. A treaty had been signed between Kandy and Dutch envoy Marcelis Boschouwer but had not amounted to much. Soon after Rajasingha's accession however the Dutch, now firmly established in Batavia, put Portuguese Goa under a blockade. On 28 March 1638, Rajasingha led his army to victory against the Portuguese forces at Gannoruwa. Soon after this, Rajasingha sent a request for aid to the admiral Adam Westerwolt and by 23 May 1638 had signed the Kandyan Treaty of 1638, an extensive military and trade treaty. The Dutch seized Batticaloa on 18 May 1639 and a joint Kandyan–Dutch campaign began to make inroads into Portugal's lowland territories. The alliance was however deeply unpopular with the inhabitants of Kandy.

Tensions soon arose between the two parties. Batticaloa was the traditional port of the Kandyan kingdom (Trincomalee had long been lost, first to the Jaffna kingdom and then to the Portuguese), and Rajasingha was eager to acquire it as soon as possible. The Dutch, however, demurred, demanding full payment for their assistance in displacing the Portuguese. Despite a rising suspicion that the Dutch were not in Sri Lanka to expel the Portuguese, so much as to replace them, the alliance was one that was too valuable for Rajasingha to simply cancel, and joint Dutch–Kandyan efforts resulted in the seizure of Galle on 13 March 1640 and the restriction of Portuguese power to the west coast of Sri Lanka by 1641.

The slow end of the Eighty Years' War however soon resulted in a truce being called between Dutch and Portuguese forces in Sri Lanka (the crowns of Spain and Portugal were united between 1580 and 1640) sometime between 1641 and 1645. Rajasinga, and many of his advisers, furiously concluded that the Dutch intended to carve Sri Lanka up with the Portuguese, to the detriment of native power. The alliance of 1638 came to an abrupt end and Kandy launched into what was to be a hundred years of intermittent warfare with the Dutch.

The period between 1645 and 1649 saw the Kandyan adopting a scorched earth policy in eastern Sri Lanka. Capturing and annexing Dutch held territory was out of the question for the Kandyans who could muster neither the firepower nor the manpower for an occupation. Nevertheless, Rajasingha's policy of intentionally burning crops and depopulation villages drove the Dutch to the negotiating table and in 1649 and the Kandyan-Dutch alliance was resurrected, albeit on slightly different terms.

== Later reign: stalemate ==
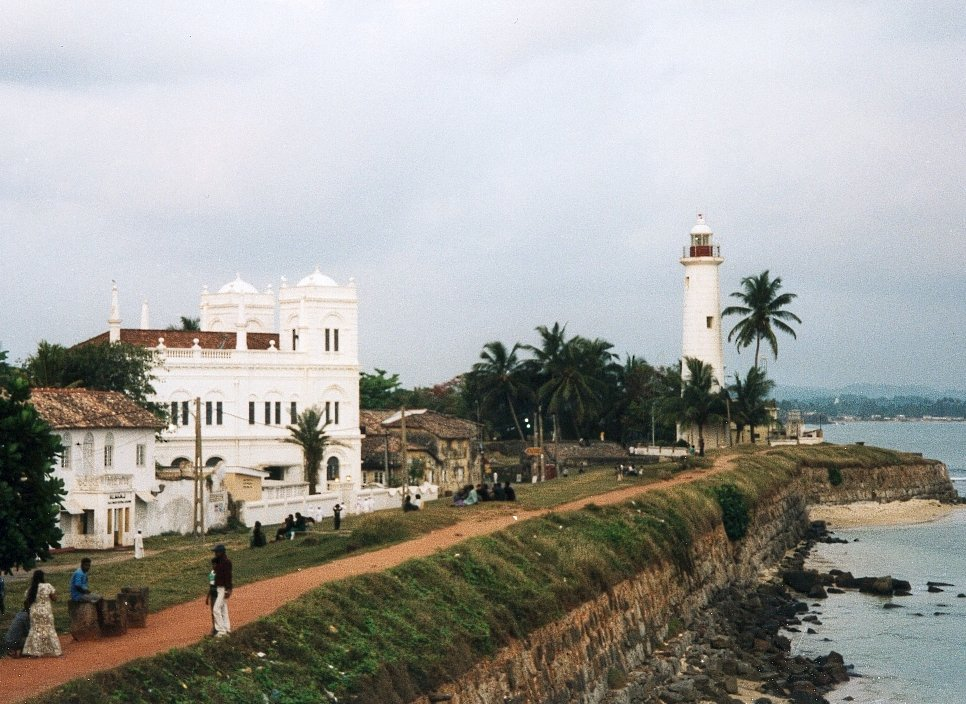
The fort of Galle in southern Sri Lanka, first a Portuguese, then a Dutch stronghold

Despite the resurrection of the treaty tensions remained between the Dutch and the Kandyans. The Treaty of Münster had secured Dutch independence in Europe in 1648 and they could now pursue colonial and mercantile expansion without fighting a ruinous war on their doorstep simultaneously. In contrast the kingdom of Kandy was exhausted by constant war, and still without access to Batticaloa, Trincomalee, and the lowlands. Furthermore, it had limited resources, and was increasingly wracked by internal instability.

Nevertheless, from 1652 joint Kandyan-Dutch forces waged an increasingly brutal war against Portuguese strongholds along the coast. During this time Rajasingha had to request support from the sub-king — Patabanda — of Koggala, which suggests that the Kandyan kingdom had by this time become very decentralised, and that local leaders held considerable power.

The landlocked Kandyans were successful in the inland area of the Korales and Sabaragamuwa but relied heavily on Dutch sea power. Accordingly, in August 1655 a large Dutch fleet commanded by Gerard Pietersz. Hulft arrived and the war entered its final phase with the siege by land and sea of the Portuguese colonial capital Colombo. By this point Rajasingha did not trust the Dutch at all and insisted that the city should be ceded to the Kandyan the moment it fell. When this happened in 1656, however, the Dutch shut the gates and left the Kandyans in the hinterlands. Faced with what he saw as yet another example of Dutch perfidy, Rajasingha repeated his devastations of the mid-1640s in the hinterlands of Colombo and withdrew to Kandy. The Dutch in the meanwhile secured power over the kingdom of Jaffna in 1658 and essentially replaced the Portuguese as Kandy's natural enemy on the island.

Safe in his mountain fastness Rajasingha now adopted the same tactics he had deployed against the Portuguese to harass the Dutch. In 1660 his army is known to have been in the vicinity of Dutch-held Trincomalee, and seized the Englishman Robert Knox. Knox subsequently moved to Senkadagala and lived there until 1679; his writings provide one of the best sources on the Kandyan kingdom in the 17th century. Rajasingha may also have considered involving the French in Sri Lankan politics in an attempt to get yet another European power to displace the Dutch.

In Kandy, Rajasingha faced discontented nobles and a populace who had always been opposed to the alliance with the Dutch. The internal situation became so unstable that for a while Rajasingha was forced to abandon the palace and allow rebels to seize control of Sengkadagala, and even suspended the annual Perahara. In 1664, he faced open rebellion from a noble known as Ambanwela Rala, and, unable in his fury to think of a suitable punishment, sent him to the Dutch, assuming they would execute him as a Kandyan noble. It was a mistake — Ambanwela Rala traded his knowledge of the workings of Kandy for a large coconut estate in Dutch territory and died a rich man.

Despite this the king managed to retain control of the crown and expanded the sacred precinct of Kandy, the Dalada Maligawa, adding an extra storey to the central building.

== Significance ==
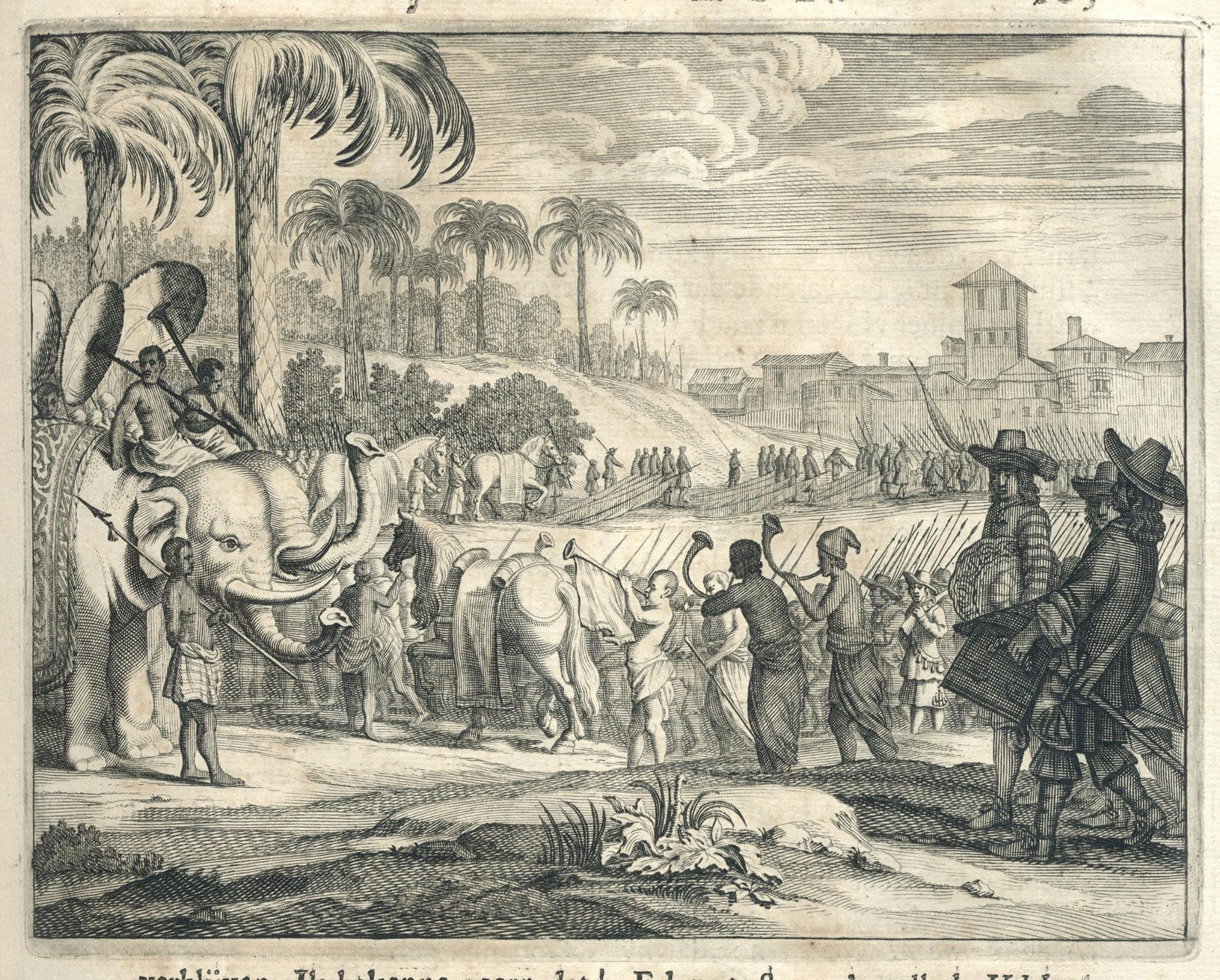
The arrival of general Hulft at the court of Rajasingha II (by Johannes Janssonius Waasbergen, circa 1672)

The single most important trend of Rajasingha's long reign was the replacement of the Portuguese by the Dutch. The strategy of bringing in one European power to help fend off another had backfired spectacularly, and the Kandyan kingdom found itself in much the same position as it had been with the Portuguese. Despite the Dutch being less determined to convert the mass populace and impose their cultural dominance, Europeans increasingly came to be seen as rapacious adventurers who were simply incapable of honouring their deals.

The situation inside the Kandyan kingdom became increasingly unstable and during Rajasingha's reign many of the powerful families that came to dominate Kandyan politics in the 18th century acquired greater power. Attempts on Rajasingha's life appear to have been rather commonplace. Rajasingha's reign also saw a gradual diminution of the Kandyans' dreams of reuniting Sri Lanka under a single, native, crown.

== See also ==
- List of Sri Lankan monarchs
- Mahavamsa
- History of Sri Lanka

== Sources ==
- Kings & Rulers of Sri Lanka

Rajasinha II Konnapu Bandara Dynasty Born: 1608 Died: 25 November or 6 December 1687
Regnal titles
Preceded by Senarat	King of Kandy; 1635–25 November 1687	Succeeded by Vimaladharmasurya II
