= Jayavira =

King of Kandy from 1511 to 1551

Jayavīra

King of Kandy
- Reign: 1511-1551
- Predecessor: Senasammata Vikramabahu
- Successor: Karalliyadde Bandara
- Spouse: Santhane Devi of Kirawelle; Sampala Devi of Gampola
- Issue: Karalliyadde Bandara; Prince Kumarasinghe; Leelawathi (Queen Consort of Sithawaka); Dona Isabella (Queen Consort of Kotte)
- House: House of Siri Sanga Bo
- Father: Senasammata Vikramabahu
- Mother: Queen Mayurawathi

Jayavīra was King of Kandy from 1511 to 1551. He succeeded his father Senasammata Vikramabahu as king and was succeeded by his son Karalliyadde Bandara. During the reign of Banḍāra, Catholic friars appeared at court and some conversions took place in the kingdom.

== See also ==
- List of Sri Lankan monarchs

Jayavira House of Siri Sanga Bo Born: ? ? Died: ? 1552
Regnal titles
Preceded by Senasammata Vikramabahu	King of Kandy; 1511–1552	Succeeded by Karalliyadde Bandara
