= Kusumasana Devi =

Queen of Kandy in 1581

Kusumāsana Devi කුසුමාසන දේවී
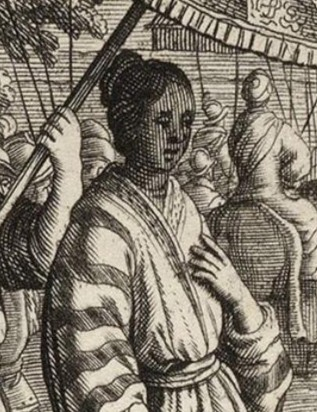
- Kusumāsana Devi as depicted by a Dutch artist

Queen regnant of Kandy
- Reign: 1581
- Predecessor: Karalliyadde Bandara
- Successor: Rajasinha I

Queen consort of Kandy
- First Tenure: 1594–1604
- Predecessor: Queen Consort Nilupulmala Kirawelle
- Second tenure: 1604–10 July 1613
- Successor: Queen Consort Suriya Devi
- Born: c.1578 Royal Palace, Kandy, Sri Lanka.
- Died: 10 July 1613 (aged 35); Welimannatota Palace, Kegalle.
- Burial: Rockhill Estate, Kegalle.
- Spouse: Yamasinghe Bandara (died 1592) Vimaladharmasuriya I (m. 1594; died 1604) Senarat (m. 1604; died 1635)
- Issue: Dom João, Crown Prince; Maha Astana, Crown Prince; Kumārasiṃha Astana, Crown Prince; Princess Sūriya Mahadassin; Princess Antanassin; Vijayapāla, Crown Prince; Rajasinha II
Names
- Sri Kusum Astane Maha Biso Bandara
- House: Vikramabahu
- Father: Karalliyadde Bandara
- Mother: Denawaka Kusumasana Devi (Gallegama Adasin) of Kirawelle
- Religion: Roman Catholicism prev. Theravada Buddhism

Kusumāsana Devi (Sinhala: කුසුමාසන දේවී), (died 10 July 1613), also known as Dona Catherina of Kandy (Sinhala: දෝන කැතරිනා), was the ruling Queen of Kandy in 1581. She was deposed, but became the queen consort of Kandy by marriage to Vimaladharmasuriya I of Kandy from 1594 to 1604.

== Life ==
In her infancy, she and her father Karaliyadde Bandara fled the kingdom to the Portuguese. Later she was baptised by the Portuguese and named Dona Catarina.

=== Queen regnant ===
After the death of her father in 1581, the Portuguese installed her as a client ruler in the Campaign of Danture. She was at this point a teenager. She succeeded her father Karaliyadde Bandara as king of Kandy. The attempt was a disaster, with Portuguese forces completely wiped out. She was deposed by Rajasinha I of the Kingdom of Sitawaka in the same year she ascended the throne.

Dona Catherina was installed as Empress of Ceylon by the Portuguese. B. P. Aryatilake did not recognize her title of "Empress" because the term was used by foreign invaders to set up local rulers against each other. On the other hand, A. Denis N. Fernando recognized her title of "Empress" because the King of Kandy styled himself as Emperor of Ceylon in some letters.

=== Queen consort ===
In 1594, she became the Queen Consort to Vimaladharmasuriya I of Kandy to solidify his rule after the defeat of King Rajasinhe I three years prior. Finally, she married her former brother-in-law Senarat who succeeded to the throne following the death of King Vimaladharmasuriya in 1604, also to solidify his legitimacy as ruler. Her ascendancy was contingent on converting to Buddhism, but she secretly taught Catholicism to her subjects during her life.

She had three children by King Vimaladharmasuriya - Mahastana, Surya and Santana. She also had three children by King Senerath: Kumarasingha Astana, Vijayapala Astane and Deva Astane. Earlier she had a son, Prince Philip Jnr. from her first husband, Yamasinghe Bandara, who died a few weeks after birth. Mahastana died in 1612 after six days of sickness. Her youngest son Mahastane later succeeded his father as King Rajasinhe II, known for the agreement with the Dutch to end Portuguese rule.

She fell sick after her son Mahastane died in 1612, with her illness attributed to excessive grief by Philippus Baldaeus. She died on 10 July 1613 at the age of 35.

== In popular culture ==
- A biographical tele series was aired in the 2019 in TV Derana, where Vidhushi Uththara portrayed the role.

== See also ==
- List of Sri Lankan monarchs
- Devi Kusumasana Movie

Kusumasana Devi House of Siri Sanga Bo Born: ? 15?? Died: July 1613
Regnal titles
| Preceded by Karalliyadde Bandara | Monarch of Kandy; 1581–1581 | Succeeded by Rajasinha I |
