= Yamasinghe Bandara =

Yamasinghe Bandara was a Kandyan Prince who was the nephew of the reiging monarch Karalliyadde Bandara, (r. 1551 to 1581). Bandara helped the Portuguese take control of Kandy and was installed as ruler in 1592. However Bandara died the following year.

== See also ==
- History of Sri Lanka
