= Karalliyadde Bandara =

King of Kandy from 1551 to 1581

Karalliyadde Banḍāra කරලියැද්දේ බණ්ඩාර

King of Kandy
- Reign: 1551-1581
- Predecessor: Jayavira Bandara
- Successor: Kusumasana Devi
- Born: Royal Palace, Kandy, Sri Lanka
- Spouse: Denawaka Kusumasana Devi (Galegama Adasin) from Kirawelle clan
- Issue: Dona Margerida; Kusumasana Devi
Names
- Karalliyadde Jayavira Bandara
- House: House of Siri Sanga Bo
- Dynasty: Moriya
- Father: Jayavira Bandara
- Mother: Santhana Devi of Keerawalle

Karalliyadde Banḍāra (Sinhala: කරලියැද්දේ බණ්ඩාර), was the King of Kandy, who ruled from 1551 to 1581. During his reign, Banḍāra publicly embraced Catholicism, brought to the island by the Portuguese. He and his infant daughter princess Kusumāsana Devi fled the kingdom with his retinue. The princess was later baptized by the Portuguese and called Dona Catarina. He succeeded his father Jayavira Bandara as king and was succeeded by his daughter Kusumasana Devi.

== In popular culture ==
- Portrayed by Niroshan Wijesinghe in the 2019 TV Derana TV series Kusumasana Devi.

== See also ==
- List of Sri Lankan monarchs

Karalliyadde Bandara House of Siri Sanga Bo Born: ? ? Died: ? ?
Regnal titles
Preceded by Jayavira Bandara	King of Kandy; 1552–1582	Succeeded by Kusumasana Devi
