= Vimaladharmasuriya I =

King of Kandy from 1592 to 1604

Vimaladharmasūriya I පළමුවන විමලධර්‍මසූරිය
- Thrisinhaladheeshwara; Lankeshwara; Bhupathi
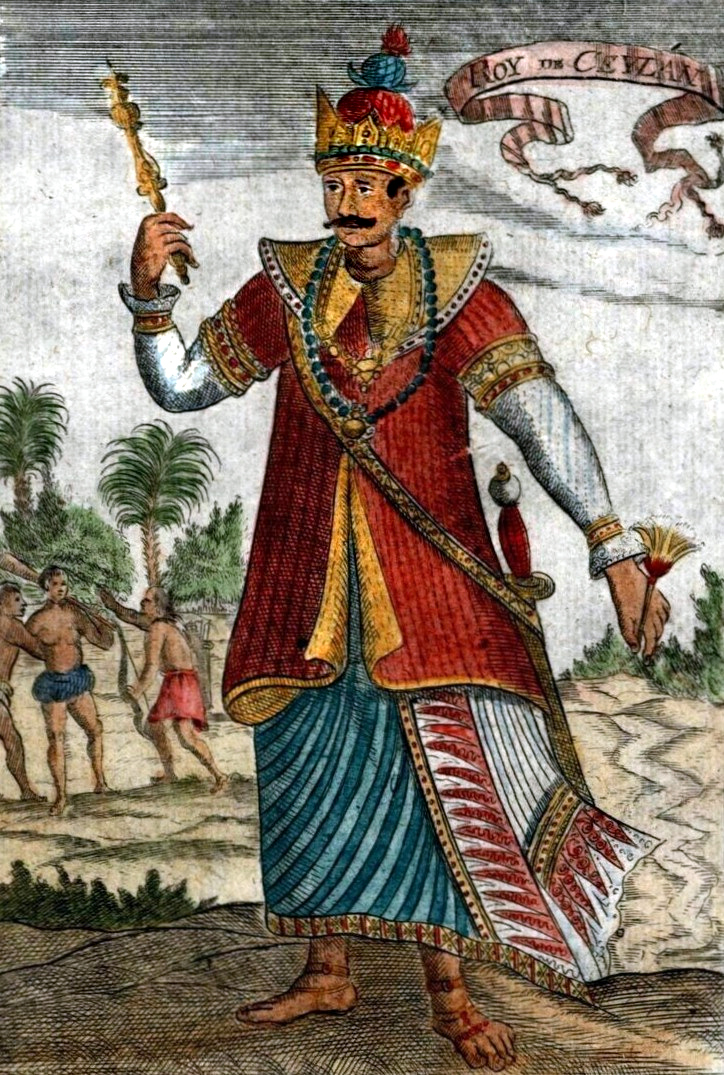
- Drawing of the king by Alain Manesson Mallet (circa 1685) (colorized)

King of Kandy
- Reign: 1592–1604
- Predecessor: Rajasinha I of Sitawaka
- Successor: Senarat of Kandy
- Born: Konappu Bandara; Peradeniya, Kingdom of Kandy
- Died: 1604; Royal Palace Complex of Kandy, Kandy, Kingdom of Kandy
- Burial: Asgiri Temple, Kandy, Sri Lanka
- Consort: Queen Kusumasana Devi of Kandy
- Spouses: Dona Amelia (Yakadadoli)
- Issue: Crown Prince Mahastenne; Princess Suriya Mahadasin/Suriya Devi; Princess Sampala Mahadasin/ Sama Devi; Crown Prince Vijayapāla, Prince of Matale; Crown Prince Kumārasiṃha Astana, Prince of Uva
- House: House of Dinajara
- Father: Weerasundara Bandara
- Mother: Kosbokke Gedara Vimalu
- Religion: Roman Catholic (c. 1580s–1591); Theravāda Buddhism (1591–1604)

Vimaladharmasuriya I (Sinhala: පළමුවන විමලධර්‍මසූරිය), (died 1604) was the king of the Kingdom of Kandy from 1592 to 1604. He is best known for successfully repelling two major Portuguese offensives: the Battle of Danture in 1594 and the Battle of Balana in 1602, in both of which the Portuguese suffered decisive defeats.

== Origin ==
=== Name ===
Vimaladharmasuriya I is referred to by four names by different sources. Rajavaliya mentions his early name as Konappu Bandara and says he is the son of a Kandyan chieftain, Weerasundara Bandara of Peradeniya. Reports of early Dutch visitors Sebald de Veert and Joris van Spilbergen mention him as Don João da Austria. Joao Rebeiro mentions one Don Juan Appuhamy, a commoner who was sent to conquer the kingdom of Kandy and of Konnapu Bandara. Historians have also noted that from 1604 to 1617 there is little information available as to what happened in the Kandyan Kingdom. Therefore, there is the possibility of mixing up of several personalities by later historians in reconstructing the history of that period. As per the deed given by this king to the chief commander of Campaign of Danture, his mother's name is Kosbokke Gedara Vimalu, after whom he took up his name Vimaladharmasuriya.

=== Early life ===
Vimaladharmasuriya I, known as Konappu Banḍāra or Galagoda Wimaladharmasurya Bandara before his ascension, was the son of a distinguished aristocrat, from Hatara kōrale (‘four districts’) (roughly equivalent to today’s Kegalla District), Galagoda Weerasundara Bandara. Vimaladharmasuriya's father was murdered by Rajasinghe l. As a result Banḍāra had to flee to Portuguese Goa where he became a Catholic convert as Don Juan de Áustria.

=== Trouble in the Kingdom ===
Rajasinghe l invaded the Kandyan Kingdom in 1582 with the help of Weerasundara Bandara and overthrew the Kandyan ruler Karalliyadde Bandara. During the invasion, Karaliyadde Bandara was able to decamp from Kandy with his wife, younger daughter (Kusumasana Devi) and nephew (Yamasinghe Bandara). But he and his wife died on the way while his nephew and daughter was able to reach the Portuguese fort at Mannar. Rajasinghe I made Veerasundara Bandara the ruler of the Kandyan Kingdom. But soon became suspicious of him. Rajasinghe I tricked Veerasundara Bandara to come to Seethawaka and killed him.

=== Under the Portuguese and Baptism ===
Because of his father's murder, Konappu Bandara secretly ran away from Kandy to the Portuguese fort at Colombo. He was sent to Goa by the Portuguese and was there baptised as Don Juan a and learned fighting techniques from the Portuguese. It was said that he attended some of the battles there with the Portuguese. The ruler appointed by Rajasinghe l for the Kandyan Kingdom was Nikapitiye Bandara who turned out to be a ruthless ruler.

== Reign ==
=== Kingship ===
Vimaladharmasuriya meeting with the Dutch explorer Joris van Spilbergen in 1602

King Vimaladharmasuriya is regarded by some historians as the Kandyan Kingdom's second founder, responsible for its revival. He was baptized under the Portuguese name of Dom João da Austria. In 1594 he married Princess Kusmasana Devi who, as Dona Catherina, was put forward by the Portuguese as the rightful claimant to the throne and became king. After renouncing Christianity and embracing Buddhism, Vimaladharmasuriya constructed a two-tiered shrine close to his palace in order to sanctify his capital, Kandy, and accommodate the politically-important relic of the tooth of the Buddha.

=== Welcoming the Dutch ===
The Dutch explorer Joris van Spilbergen offered an alliance to fight off the Portuguese. Following these negotiations, Sebald de Weert was officially sent by Admiral Wybrand van Warwijck to mount a joint counter-attack against the Portuguese. The alliance ended in disaster, however, during a drinking party, where the Dutch became rowdy, De Weert according to François Valentijn insulted the queen, and De Weert and all 47 Dutchmen accompanying him consequently were killed. An alliance would not be possible again until 1612, when a new envoy, Marcellus de Boschouwer, established a treaty with Senarat of Kandy, ultimately leading to the eviction of the Portuguese from the island, and about one century of Dutch rule in coastal regions, until the British in turn took the island in 1815.

=== Buddhism ===
At the time of Vimaladharmasuriya's coronation Buddhism was on the verge of disappearing from the island. The king learned that ordained Buddhist monks no longer existed on the island so he sent one of his ministers to Lower Burma and reestablished Buddhism in Kandy. By this time, the relic of the tooth of the Buddha was hidden in Delgamuwa Raja Maha Vihara in Sabaragamuwa Province. The king brought the tooth relic to Kandy and built a two-storied Temple of the Tooth near the Royal Palace of Kandy to house the relic. He also repaired many ruined Buddhist temples throughout his kingdom such as Gadaladeniya, Lakathilaka and Ridi Viharaya.

== In popular culture ==
- Portrayed by Sangeeth Satharasinghe in the 2019 TV Derana TV series Kusumasana Devi.
- Portrayed by Hemal Ranasinghe in the 2025 film Devi Kusumasana.

== See also ==
- List of Sri Lankan monarchs

Vimaladharmasuriya I Konnapu Bandara Dynasty Born: ? ? Died: ? 1604
Regnal titles
Preceded by Rajasimha I	King of Kandy; 1592 –1604	Succeeded by Senarat
