= Senarat =

King of Kandy from 1604 to 1635

Senarath සෙනරත්
- Thrisinhaladheeshwara; Lankeshwara; Bhupathi

King of Kandy
- Reign: 1604–1635
- Predecessor: Vimaladharmasuriya I
- Successor: Rajasinghe II
- Born: Peradeniya, Sri Lanka
- Died: 1635; Sri Lanka
- Burial: Royal Cremation Yard, Asgiri Temple, Kandy, Sri Lanka
- Wives: Dona Catherina; Suriya Devi; Sama Devi
- Issue: Rajasinha II; Vijayapāla; Kumārasiṃha Astana
- Father: Virasundara Bandara
- Mother: Consort of Virasundara Bandara
- Religion: Theravada Buddhism

Senarath Adahasin (Sinhala: සෙනරත්), was king of the Kingdom of Kandy from 1604 to 1635. He is said to be the successor to king Vimaladharmasuriya I of Kandy. However first-hand accounts are not available concerning what happened after the death of Vimaladharmasuriya I. According to most sources, he is said to be a cousin or brother of Vimaladharmasuriya. He was not a legitimate ruler hence he married not only the deceased king's widow Dona Katherina but also her two daughters, to legitimize his claim to the throne.

He did not possess the qualities of a king and during his time Portuguese forces laid waste to Kandyan territory in frequent invasions, which he could not repulse and lost the wars.. Several rebellions rose against him during his reign and to quell those he aligned with the Portuguese. Many of his military campaigns failed except for the Battle of Randenivela, the success of which was however largely due to Prince Dewarajasinghe, his youngest son.

When the time came for him to divide his kingdom between his two stepsons & his biological son, he tricked the other two & made Rajasinghe II (his biological son) inherit the main part of his kingdom including Kandy. His two stepsons died shortly afterward - some say Senerath was responsible for this elimination of potential heirs. Rajasinghe II thus became the sole heir to his kingdom.

== See also ==
- Mahavamsa
- List of monarchs of Sri Lanka
- History of Sri Lanka
- Kingdom of Kandy

== Sources ==
- Kings & Rulers of Sri Lanka

Senarat Konnapu Bandara Born: ? ? Died: ? 1635
Regnal titles
Preceded by Vimaladharmasuriya I	King of Kandy; 1604–1635	Succeeded by Râjasimha II
