= Sitawaka campaign =

Sitawaka campaign of 1594
- Part of Sinhalese-Portuguese conflicts
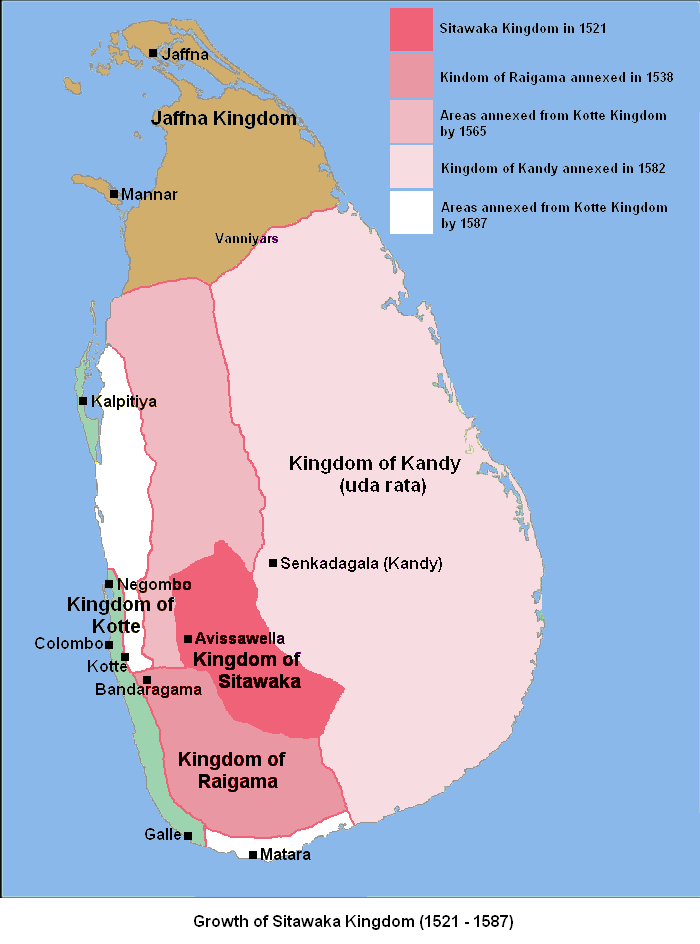
- The expansion of the Sitawaka Kingdom
Date	1594
Location	Sri Lanka
Result	Portuguese victory

Belligerents
Portuguese Empire	Kingdom of Sitawaka

Commanders and leaders
Pedro Homem Pereira (Kingdom of Sitawaka) Jayavira Bandara Mudali	(Kingdom of Sitawaka) Nikapitiye Bandara (POW) (Kingdom of Sitawaka) Panikki Mudali (Kingdom of Sitawaka) Kuruppu Arachi

Strength
750 Portuguese soldiers 6,000 lascarins	6,000 warriors

The Sitawaka campaign of 1594 was a successful military operation carried out by the Portuguese Empire and Sinhalese forces against the Kingdom of Sitawaka. It resulted in the deposition of king Nikapitiye Bandara and the installment of Jayavira Bandara Mudali on the throne.

== History ==
The Portuguese first reached Ceylon, now Sri Lanka, in 1505 and formed an alliance with the king of Kotte, who authorised them to build a fortress in Colombo. When king Vijayabahu VI was assassinated by his three sons in 1521, the kingdom was divided into three. The eldest retained the title of King of Kotte and strengthened the alliance with the Portuguese, while the other two founded the kingdoms of Raigama and Sitawaka. Raigama and almost the entire territory of the kingdom of Kotte were conquered by king Rajasinha, who besieged Colombo between 1587 and 1588 but without success.

In the 1590s, the Portuguese began the conquest of the island of Ceylon, following orders from Europe. In 1591, the Portuguese carried out a campaign against the kingdom of Jaffna after its king attacked the fortress of Manar. They succeeded in installing king Ethirimanna Cinkam, who was favourable to the Portuguese.

The death of Rajasinha in 1593 brought about new campaigns. His grandson and successor was quickly assassinated in a palace coup and replaced by Nikapitiya Bendara, but the real power lay with the perumal or commander-in-chief, Aritta Kivendu, who was of Indian origin. The perumal became so powerful that he requested the hand of the sister of Nikapityia in marriage, but this was ill-met by the Queen Regent and the Sitawaka nobility. Fearing a conspiracy against his life, he moved with the army to Manikkadawara on the pretext of conquering the Alutkuruwa region and secretly contacted the captain-major of Colombo, Pedro Homem Pereira. The perumal sent him a Portuguese prisoner and proposed to the captain that he help him conquer the throne of Sitawaka, whose territory he would divide with the king of Kotte. The proposal pleased Pereira, who accepted it, and upon receiving his reply, the perumal publicly adopted the royal name of Jayavira Bandara. As soon as declared an open revolt however, the Sinhalese nobles in his army deserted, as they did not wish to support a foreigner, and when an army from Sitawaka set out against him, he fled to Colombo, where he arrived on 1 September 1593 accompanied only by a guard of 200 warriors and 26 elephants. Panikki Mudali, who had once defected to the Portuguese but returned to Sitawaka was made the new commander-in-chief of the Sitawaka forces in place of Jayavira.

At Colombo, Jayavira Bendara prostrated himself before King Dharmapala of Kotte, declared himself his vassal and demonstrated his determination to carry out the plan.

The defection of Jayavira Bendara caused considerable damage to morale in Sitawaka, as he was their best surviving commander and soon afterwards Sitawaka lost hold of some coastal territory. The Alutkuru korale was captured by a force from around a newly built Portuguese stockade at Negombo. Another reason for the loss of morale was the Zamorin of Calicut who supplied Mapilla Muslims under the leadership of Marikkars to counter the Portuguese was offended when the commanders were killed by Mayadunne as he was threatened by the Portuguese.

=== Capture of Kaduwela ===
Portuguese standard bearing the Cross of the Order of Christ.

In September 15, a detachment of 400 Portuguese led by captains Diogo de Melo da Cunha, Gregório da Costa de Sousa, João Vaz de Araújo, João Rodrigues Camelo and Álvaro Carvalho, and 1,200 lascarins commanded by Jayavira Bendara left Colombo to attack the stockade fort of Kaduwela, defended by Kuruppu Arachi of Koratota, about 15km from Colombo. Two attacks were repelled, but one of the Sitawaka officers Wirasekara Mudaliyar of Hewagama kidnapped Kuruppu Arachi's wife and defected to Dharmapala's side, after which Kuruppu Arachi surrendered the fort. By March 1594 the lower Kelani valley was lost to Sitawaka and Jayavira's forces grew to about 3000 recruits.

The recapture of Kaduwela was appreciated by the Portuguese authorities at Goa, who sent a reinforcement of 200 men to Ceylon, under the command of Dom Gileanes de Noronha.

=== Capture of Rakgaha Watta, Malwana and Hanwella ===
Captain Pedro Homem Pereira himself then took the field with an army of 750 Portuguese and 6,000 lascarins led by Jayavira Bandara. After leaving Colombo, the stockade forts of Rakgaha Watta and Malwana were attacked by land and river, and the fire from six Portuguese fustas forced their defenders to abandon them.

Meanwhile, Pedro Lopes de Sousa called at Colombo on his way from Malacca to Goa. Upon hearing all that was happening on the island, he vowed to use all his influence to persuade the Viceroy of India to invest vigorously in the military matters in Ceylon.

The Sitawaka army was concentrated in Hanwella or Gurubewila and numbered 6,000 men. On the eve of battle the Sitawaka commander Panikki Mudali now once more and definitively crossed over to the Portuguese. The battle commenced with an attack by the 6,000 men of Jayavira and the warriors of Sitawaka put up a stubborn resistance but after six hours fighting the Portuguese attacked and captured the Hanwella fort amid bloody combat. This was virtually the end of resistance.

=== Capture of Sitawaka ===
After the capture of Hanwella, Nikapityia Bendara fled to the mountains, while the Portuguese advanced to Sitawaka, which was occupied without much resistance.

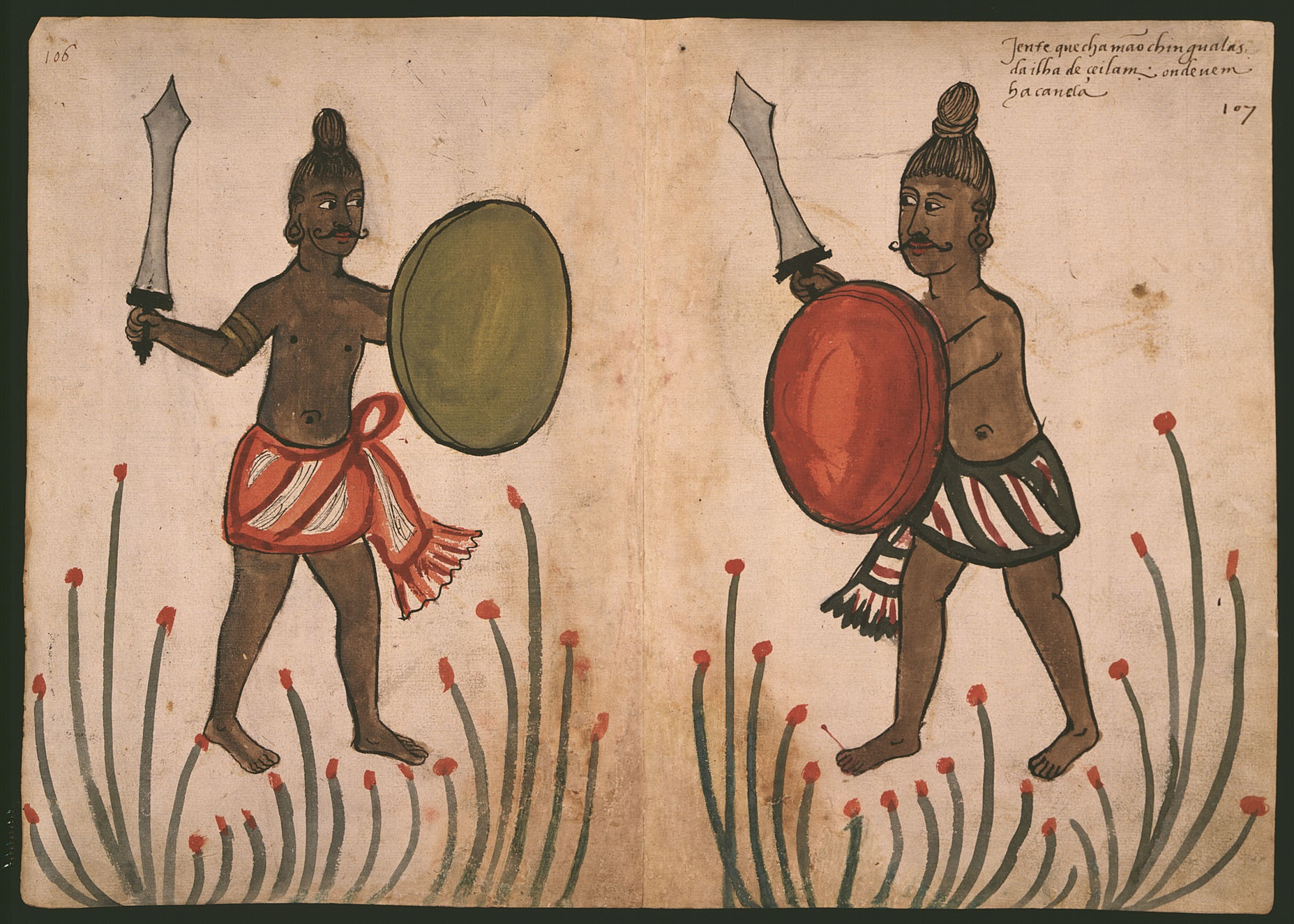
Sinhalese warriors depicted in the Códice Casanatense.

A sack valued at 4,000,000 xerafins was captured in Sitawaka and, shortly afterwards, Nikapityia was also captured at Denawaka by a detachment of 150 Portuguese accompanied by Jayavira and his men. The Queen Regent was captured while she attempted to flee to Denawaka but she died soon after. After capturing Nikapityia, they returned to Sitawaka in triumph. Jayavira then occupied the district of Matara. The kingdom of Sitawaka surrendered shortly afterwards and Jayavira assumed the throne. By May 1594 virtually the entirety of the old kingdom of Kotte acknowledged the sovereignty of Dharmapala and the authority of the Portuguese. Jayavira fulfilled his part of the agreement, and handed over the lower part of Sitawaka to Kotte. In the aftermath of the campaign, 20,000 sinhalese gathered in Sitawaka to join Jayaviras forces, attracted by his wealth.

Nikapityia was sent to Goa and, from there, Viceroy Matias de Albuquerque sent him to Portugal, where the king converted to Catholicism, adopted the name Dom Filipe and studied at the University of Coimbra.

The victorious campaigns against Jaffna in 1591 and Sitawaka in 1594 were followed by the Campaign of Danture against the kingdom of Kandy the following year, which ended in failure.

== See also ==
- Portuguese Ceylon
- Jaffna campaign
