= Sinhalese–Portuguese conflicts =

1527–1658 conflict in Sri Lanka

- Part of the Crisis of the Sixteenth Century
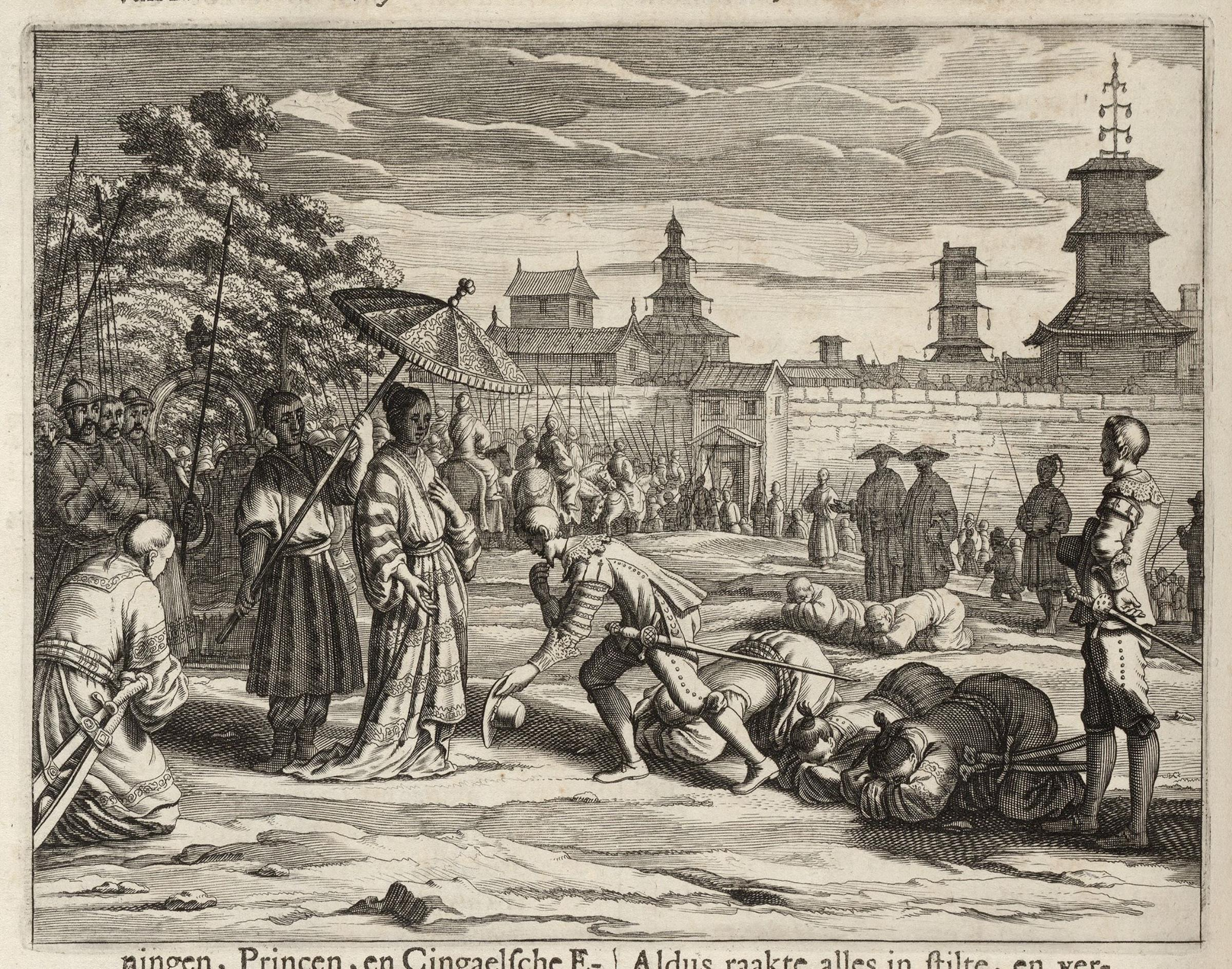
- The Portuguese army at Kandy during the campaign of Danture, by Philippus Baldaeus
Date	1518–1658
Location	Sri Lanka
Territorial changes	End of the kingdoms of Kotte, Sitawaka, Jaffna and Raigama; Establishment then destruction of Portuguese Ceylon; Incorporation of parts of Kotte and Sitawaka into the Kingdom of Kandy; Capture of Colombo, Galle, Jaffna, Raigama and much of Sitawaka by the Dutch and the establishment of Dutch Ceylon; Dutch-Kandyan victory

Belligerents
Kingdom of Sitawaka; Kingdom of Kandy; Kingdom of Raigama; Kingdom of Jaffna; Denmark-Norway (1619-22); Supported by: Zamorin of Calicut; Kingdom of Tanjore; Vanni chieftains	Portuguese Empire; Kingdom of Kotte	From 1638: Dutch East India Company

Commanders and leaders
(Kingdom of Sitawaka) Mayadunne; Rajasinha I (Kingdom of Sitawaka) Rajasuriya (Kingdom of Sitawaka) Nikapitiye Bandara; Raigam Bandara # (Kingdom of Kandy) Vimaladharmasuriya I (Kingdom of Kandy) Senarat (Kingdom of Kandy) Rajasimha II; Cankili I Puviraja Pandaram (executed); Cankili II (executed) (Denmark–Norway) Roland Crappé (WIA) (Denmark–Norway) Erik Grubbe	(Portuguese Empire) Pedro Lopes de Sousa † (Portuguese Empire) Jerónimo de Azevedo (Portuguese Empire) Constantino de Sá de Noronha † (Kingdom of Kotte) Bhuvanaikabahu VII (Kingdom of Kotte) Dharmapala of Kotte	(Dutch East India Company) Adam Westerwolt (Dutch East India Company) Willem Jacobszoon Coster (Dutch East India Company) Jan Thyszoon Payart (Dutch East India Company) Joan Maetsuycker (Dutch East India Company) Jacob van Kittensteyn (Dutch East India Company) Adriaan van der Meyden

Between 1518 and 1658, armed conflict took place between the native Sinhalese kingdoms of Sri Lanka (then known to Europeans as Ceylon), and the Portuguese Empire. It spanned from the Transitional to the Kandyan periods of Sri Lankan history. A combination of political and military moves gained the Portuguese control over most of the island, but their invasion of the final independent kingdom was a disaster, leading to a stalemate in the wider war and a truce from 1621. In 1638 the war restarted when the Dutch East India Company intervened in the conflict, initially as an ally of the Sinhalese against the Portuguese, but later as an enemy of both sides. The war concluded in 1658, with the Dutch in control of about half the island, the Kingdom of Kandy the other half, and the Portuguese expelled.

The Portuguese arrived in Sri Lanka in 1505, initially as merchants for the lucrative spice trade. Sri Lanka's Crisis of the Sixteenth Century (1521–1597) began with the Vijayabā Kollaya, the partitioning of the Kingdom of Kotte among three brothers, who began a series of wars over the succession. Starting in 1527, the Portuguese began to intervene in internal Sinhalese politics and exploiting the rivalries among the various kingdoms. The Portuguese expanded their influence by placing client rulers on the thrones of several kingdoms and directly ruling other areas. These machinations gained the Portuguese control over the Kingdom of Kotte starting in 1551. However the main beneficiary was the Kingdom of Sitawaka, was able to expand between 1521 and 1587 – through conquest of other native kingdoms – until it controlled most of Sri Lanka. Rajasinha I of Sitawaka attempted to expel the Portuguese from the island, but was repulsed with heavy losses at the siege of Colombo in 1587–8. Most of the newly conquered territories then rebelled against Sitawaka. The divided and disorganised rival kingdoms became easy targets for further Portuguese expansion, and in a series of military conflicts and political manoeuvres the Portuguese extended their control over the kingdoms of Jaffna (1591), Raigama (1593), and Sitawaka (1593).

In 1592 the Portuguese placed a client ruler on the throne of the Kingdom of Kandy, but he died soon after in suspicious circumstances and they were forced to withdraw. Seeking to subdue the last major kingdom in Sri Lanka, the Portuguese launched a military invasion of Kandy in the Campaign of Danture of 1594. The invasion was a disaster for the Portuguese, with their entire army wiped out by Kandyan forces. The war became a stalemate, with further Portuguese attempts to conquer Kandy repeatedly repulsed, whilst the Kandyans were unable to oust the Portuguese from the rest of the island. A series of rebellions in both Portuguese held territory and the Kandyan Kingdom led both sides to agree to a truce in 1621. The treaty led to Kandy formally becoming a vassal state of Portugal, but in reality maintaining its independence. This allowed both sides to crush the rebellions in their respective territories, and ended direct conflict between them for the next seventeen years. A small Danish expedition attacked Portuguese Ceylon in 1619, but was expelled from the island in 1622. The Portuguese were also able to conquer the Vanni chieftains in 1621.

The uneasy peace was eventually broken by the intervention of the Dutch East India Company in 1638, who sought to exploit the situation to take over Portuguese possessions as part of the Dutch–Portuguese War. The Dutch formed an alliance with Kandy; together they won several battles against the Portuguese, most notably the siege of Galle in 1640. However, the Dutch-Kandyan alliance broke down and the three remaining powers fought each other in triangular warfare for a time. The Dutch and Kandyans renewed their alliance in 1649 to drive the Portuguese from the island. The Portuguese stronghold at Colombo was conquered in 1656, but once this was done the Dutch immediately betrayed their Kandayn allies, taking over the Portuguese possessions. By the end of the war in 1658 all Portuguese forces had been expelled from the island. The Kingdom of Kandy was the only surviving indigenous polity, ruling almost half of Sri Lanka. The Dutch were left in control of the major population centres.

== Background ==
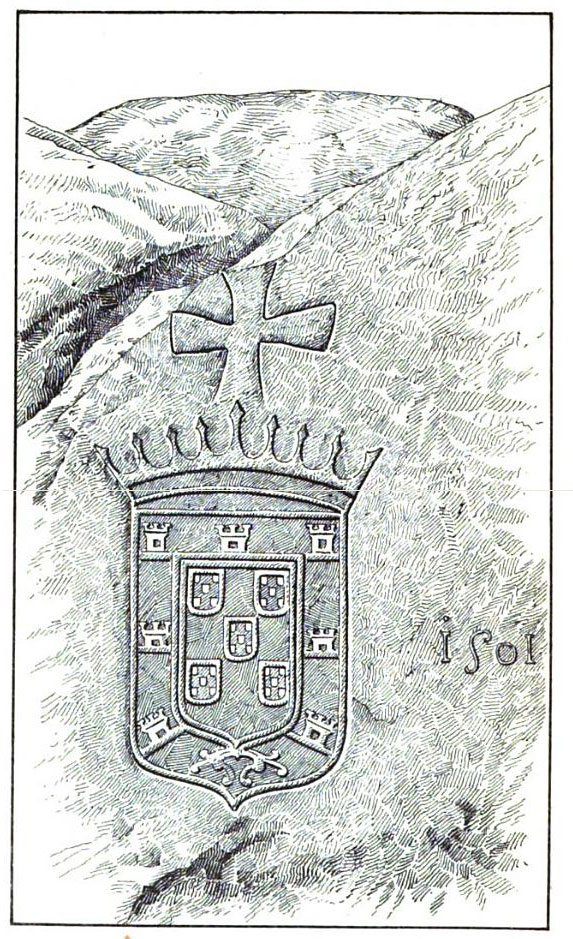
Lithograph of a 1501 Portuguese inscription on a boulder in Colombo

The Portuguese arrived in Sri Lanka in 1505 and established trade relations with the Kotte kingdom. During the early 16th century their intentions were directed towards defending their trading interests, particularly the lucrative spice trade. However, with time this policy gradually changed to territorial ambitions with the objective of outright conquest. Island resources, Sri Lanka's strategic location for both trade and naval security and rise of the Mughal Empire in India influenced this change. (Note: The rise of the Mughal empire led to an increase in efforts on Sri Lanka by the Portuguese, as evident by a claim made by Lisbon. "If someday India should be lost it could be recovered from Ceylon.")

== Early stages (1518–1521) ==
In 1518, the Governor of Portuguese India (Lopo Soares de Albergaria) obtained authorization from King Parakramabahu VIII of Kotte to build a trading post in Colombo, protected by a palisade and a wall of rammed earth, to be erected at the edge of the port. A treaty was signed between Kotte and Portugal, with terms including: Parakramabahu officially declared himself a vassal of the Portuguese king Manuel I, offered a tribute of 10 elephants, 20 ruby rings and 400 cinnamon bars, and in exchange Portugal would provide military support for Kotte.

=== Siege of Colombo (1520) ===
The construction of the fort sparked a riot in Colombo, instigated by Muslim merchants and Buddhist monks. The construction site was attacked by Sinhalese, armed with bows and a few cannons – originally offered by the Muslim merchants to Parakramabahu – but the mob was dispersed by the much more powerful bombardment of the Portuguese ships anchored in the harbour. Parakramabahu intervened to put an end to the dispute, supporting the Portuguese.

=== Siege of Colombo (1521) ===
Parakramabahu died of natural causes shortly thereafter, being succeeded by Vijayabahu VII, who was opposed to Portuguese presence. Relations worsened, with the local population refusing to sell supplies to the Portuguese. In 1520, the now-complete fortress was besieged by a large army led by Vijayabahu, equipped with several hundred firearms. After a six-month siege, Portuguese reinforcements arrived by sea, which forced Vijayabahu to lift the siege.

=== Partition of Kotte ===
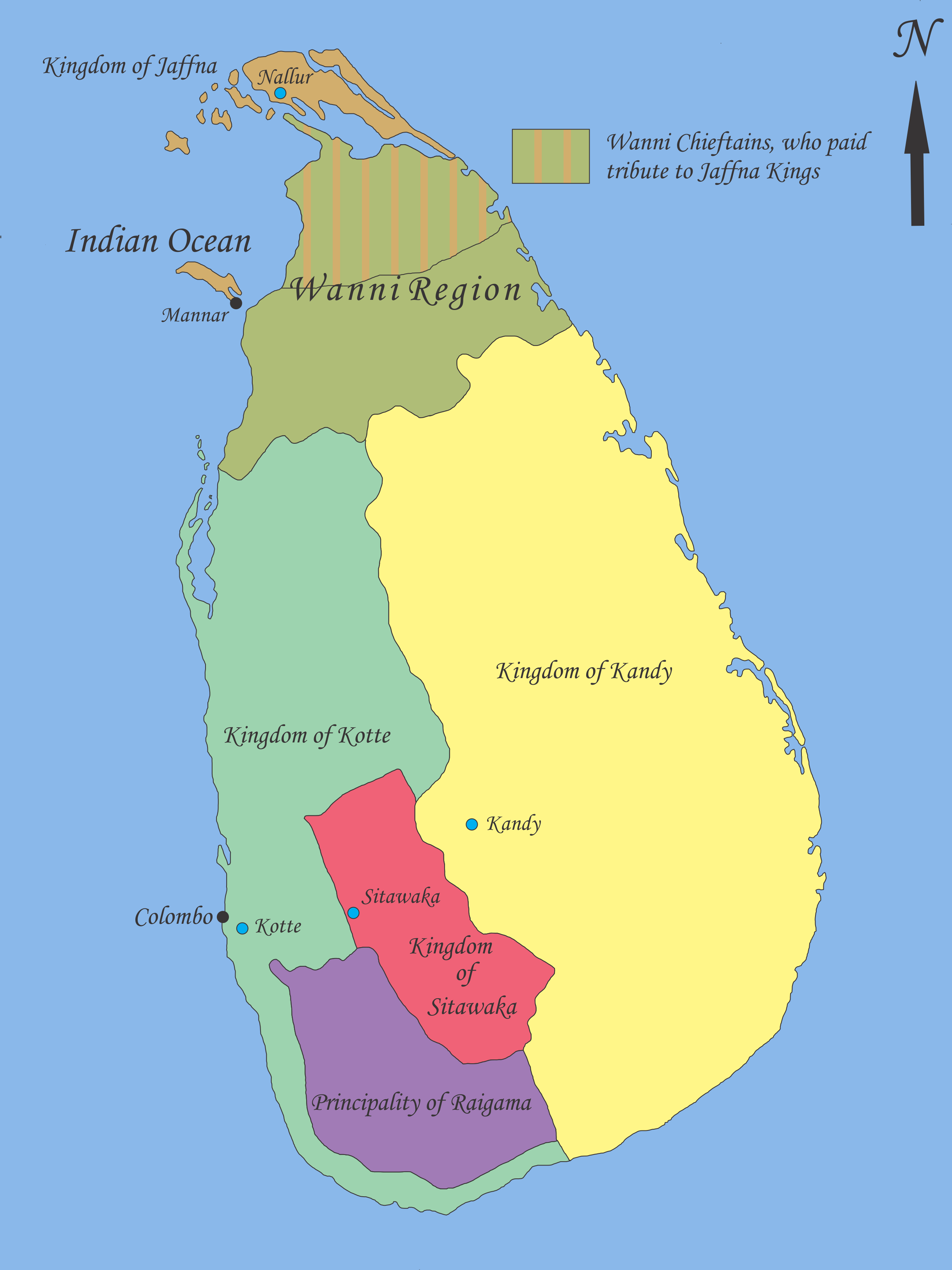
Political map of Sri Lanka soon after the Spoiling of Vijayabahu in 1521

In 1521, the three sons of Vijayabahu rebelled and killed him. The sons (Bhuvanekabahu, Pararajasingha, and Mayadunne) divided Vijayabahu's kingdom among themselves in the 'Spoiling of Vijayabahu'. Mayadunne received the Kingdom of Sitawaka, Pararajasingha was given the Kingdom of Raigama (taking the name Raigama Bandara), and Bhuvanekabahu ruled over the remaining part of Kotte (as Bhuvanekabahu VII). This event began the Crisis of the Sixteenth Century. The rivalries between these three new realms gave the Portuguese an opportunity to expand their influence on the island, by becoming involved in its internal politics.

The Portuguese initially focused on securing their fort in Colombo and the cinnamon trade that took place there. Bhuvanekabahu of Kotte renewed the alliance that had been agreed by Parakramabahu, so the Portuguese also helped to defend Kotte against attacks from Sitawaka. Portuguese influence over Kotte grew with the military aid they provided.

== Defence of Kotte against Sitawaka (1521–1588) ==
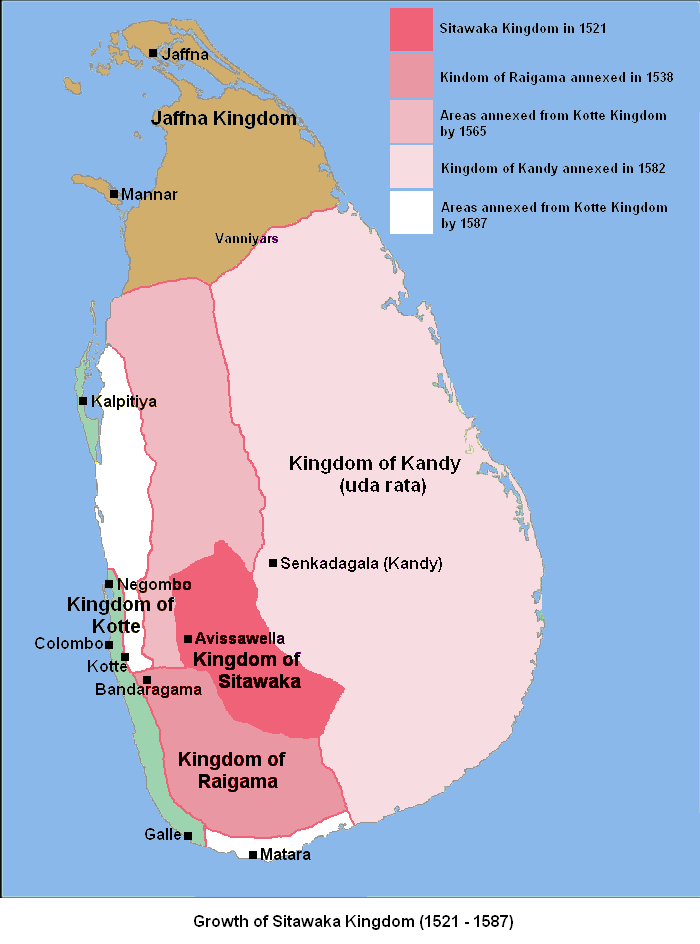
Growth of the Sitawaka kingdom from 1521 to 1587

The first invasion of Kotte by Mayadunne was repulsed by a Bhuvanekabahu, assisted by forces despatched by the Portuguese Viceroy of Goa. Another attempt at seizing Kotte in 1537 failed when Mayadunne's forces were defeated by forces under the command of the Portuguese captain-major in Colombo, Afonso de Souza; a fleet sent from Calicut to assist was on this occasion defeated by the Portuguese at Vedalai. A truce was negotiated between Sitawaka and Kotte in the aftermath of the conflict, and Mayadunne turned his attention south to the kingdom of Raigama, which he annexed following the death of Raigam Bandara (Pararajasinha) in 1538.

With Raigam Bandara's death in 1538 Mayadunne annexed the Kingdom of Raigama and invaded Kotte a third time. Buvanekabahu VII defeated Mayadunne's invading forces with the help of the Portuguese, eventually paving the way to an uneasy peace. The Portuguese wanted to conduct a full-scale offensive against Sitawaka and neutralize King Mayadunne, but King Bhuvanekabahu VII did not support their cause; he only wanted Portuguese help for defensive purposes.

Two more invasions of Kotte followed in the next five years. The fourth invasion, beginning in 1539, failed following resistance organised by the new Portuguese captain-major in Colombo, Miguel Ferreira. Calicut yet again provided troops and weaponry to Sitawaka; however, following defeat, Kulhenamarikkar and Pachimarikkar, two of the Zamorin's generals, were handed over to the Portuguese and the alliance between Calicut and Sitawaka ended. News in 1543 that Bhuvanekabahu had named his grandson Dharmapala as his successor prompted a fifth invasion, yet again repulsed with the aid Portuguese forces under the command of the new captain-General, António Barreto.

Portuguese involvement in the internal politics of Kotte increased with the arrival in 1550 of viceroy Afonso de Noronha and a contingent of some 500 Portuguese soldiers. The Portuguese sacked Sitawaka later that year. Accounts indicate that Mayadunne had adopted a policy of simply evacuating his capital and retreating into the surrounding terrain when the Portuguese approached. Once the Portuguese had left, the king's forces would harassed them along the route down to the Kelani river.

=== Siege of Kotte ===
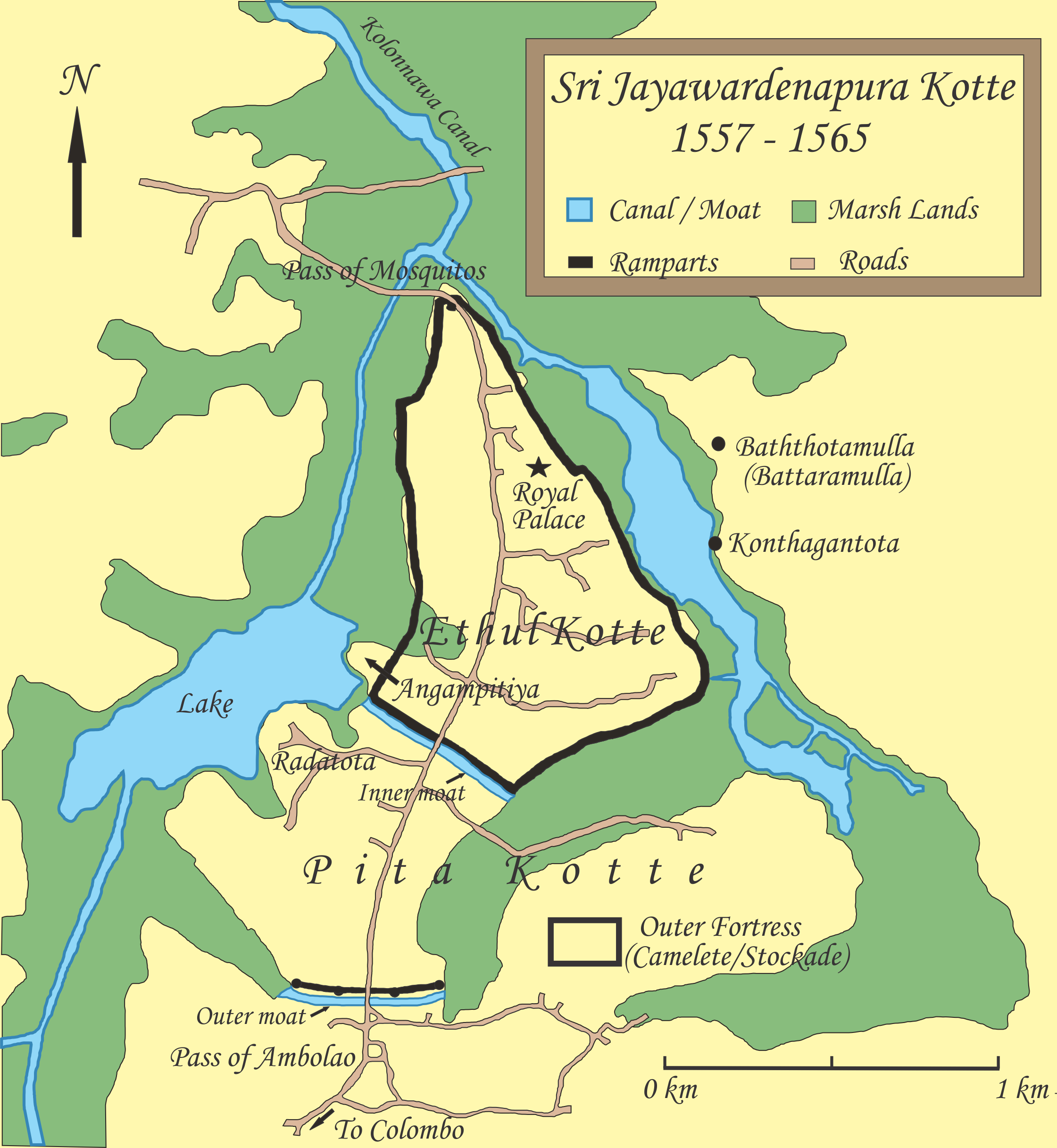
Map of Kotte and its defences, 1557–1565

In 1551 Bhuvanekabahu was killed by a shot fired by a Portuguese soldier, which was claimed to be an accidental discharge of the weapon. His young grandson, Dharmapala of Kotte, was established on the Kotte throne under the protection of the Portuguese.

After consulting with his council, Mayadunne proclaimed himself heir to the throne of Kotte and appealed to the subjects of Kotte to join his cause. Many chieftains and their followers answered and deserted to Sitawaka. Mayadunne taking the initiative rallied his forces to invade the Kingdom of Kotte. This sparked a series of new campaigns between the Kingdom of Sitawaka, the Kingdom of Kandy and the Portuguese.

The Siege of Kotte from November 1557 to November 1558 involved a 50,000 strong Sitawaka army led by King Mayadunne that besieged the capital of Kotte Kingdom Sri Jayawardenapura Kotte, for 12 months against combined Portuguese and Kotte forces, led by captain-major Dom Afonso Pereira de Lacerda. After receiving reinforcements from Mannar, Portuguese made a sally and succeeded in forcing the besiegers to withdraw. This siege marked the beginning of a series of battles between Portuguese and Sitawaka forces, and ultimately ended as Portuguese abandoned Sri Jayawardenapura Kotte in 1565.

=== Battle of Mulleriyawa ===
The battle of Mulleriyawa (1559) was a major military engagement between the Sinhalese Kingdom of Sitawaka and the Portuguese Empire. It is recorded as the worst defeat the Portuguese suffered in Asia. Led by the prince Tikiri Bandara, the Sitawaka army trapped the Portuguese in the muddy marshes of the Kelani Valley, where their heavy armor and firearms were useless. The prince used a pincer movement, attacking from multiple sides with elite Angampora fighters and war elephants equipped with iron chains. The Portuguese formations were completely broken, and nearly half of their soldiers were killed. This victory stopped Portuguese expansion into the island's interior and the local force could systematically destroy a professional European army using superior tactics and terrain.

=== Further campaigns involving Sitawaka ===
Pressing their advantage, Mayadunne and Tikiri Bandara launched a two-pronged attack on Kotte in 1564, laying siege to both Kotte and Colombo. Portuguese forces were forced to retreat from Kotte with Dharmapala, leaving Sitawaka in control of much of the kingdom. Major Sitawakan garrisons were established at Wattala, Nagalagama and Mapane.

A thin coastal strip, running from Negombo to Galle and including the fort in Colombo, was kept provisioned from the sea by Portuguese ships and remained in Portuguese hands. Strategically, this enabled them to harass and wage attritionary campaigns against the kingdom, the most notable being the invasion of 1574 which saw Negombo, Kalutara and Beruwala plundered, Sitawakan garrisons at Nagalagama and Mapane expelled, and the districts of Weligama and Chilaw ravaged.

=== Siege of Colombo (1587–1588) ===
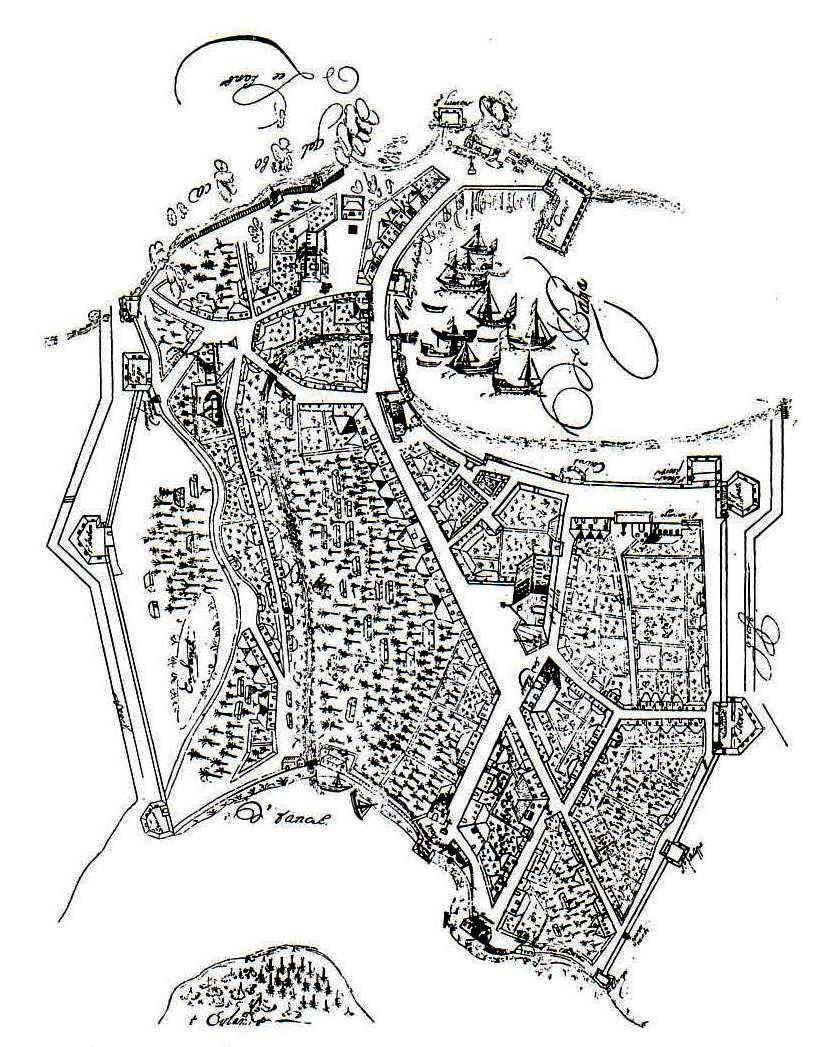
Plan view of Portuguese Colombo, made in 1650

Having conquered Kandy, King Rajasinha I of Sitawaka turned his attention to the Portuguese stronghold at Colombo. He timed the campaign to begin shortly after the start of the monsoon season, so the Portuguese would not be able to send reinforcements by sea. The Sinhalese army appeared around Colombo on 4 June, consisting of 50,000 men, 2200 pack elephants, 40,000 oxen, and 150 small calibre bronze cannon. Supporting the army were 65 light galleys which were to blockade the fortress by sea. The Portuguese captain defending Colombo was João de Correia de Brito, who had 300 Portuguese soldiers assisted by 700 Lascarins, plus a civilian population of some 60,000. Foreseeing the possibility of a siege, he had stockpiled supplies of food and ammunition. The Portuguese flotilla of 6 galleys was beached due to the weather, but nevertheless Brito sent a small craft over the sea to Goa with a distress call.

Knowing of Colombo's defences, which included a lagoon serving as a moat by its southern side, Rajasinha began the siege by having entrenchments dug around the walls and the lagoon drained, which took a month. With the digging complete, Rajasinha rallied his entire army outside Colombo in a display of force, shouting war-cries to intimidate the besieged. Undaunted, Brito ordered a sally against the troops closest to the city, throwing them into great confusion.

On the night of 3 August, the Rajasinha ordered the first mass assault. Thousands of Sinhalese attempted to scale Colombo's earthen walls, while sappers (aided by hundreds of elephants) tried to breach them. They were met with superior Portuguese firepower. Some Sinhalese were able to climb onto the bastions São Lourenço and São Gonçalo, but were repelled by a swift Portuguese counter attack. By the following morning, the Sinhalese had been driven off, having suffered 400 dead and 2,000 wounded.

Over the following months Rajasinha attempted three more assaults on Colombo, along with attempts to undermine the walls, while the Portuguese conducted sorties against Sinhalese positions. With the end of the monsoon, the first Portuguese reinforcements from Goa arrived on 11 September. Further ships carrying reinforcements arrived on 4 October, 23 October, 4 November, and 15 February. Finally, on 18 February a large fleet of eighteen galleys commanded by Manuel de Sousa Coutinho arrived, after raiding Sitawakan shores in northwestern Sri Lanka. The fleet sailed in battle formation and sounded its guns; the Portuguese defenders greeted it by ringing their church bells and firing a general salvo from the fortress' cannon.

With the arrival of the reinforcements, there were now 2,000 Portuguese soldiers inside the fortress, in addition to the lascarins and civilian defenders. Rajasinha realised that the opportunity to take Colombo had been lost and lifted the siege shortly afterwards. Over the eight-month campaign, the Sinhalese had lost 5,000 men.

== Portuguese campaigns against Jaffna, Sitawaka and Kandy ==
Portuguese banner displaying the Cross of Christ, commonly used by the Portuguese at sea and on land by army units in the 16th–17th centuries, including on Ceylon

In 1588 Kandy rebelled against its new Sitawaka rulers. However, the heirs of the Kandyan royal family had fallen under Portuguese influence and were held in Colombo. In 1592 the Portuguese intervened in Kandy, placing their protégé Yamasinghe Bandara on the throne. However, the new ruler died in suspicious circumstances shortly after his coronation. The Portuguese accused a rival Kandyan faction of poisoning Bandara, but the Kandyans blamed the Portuguese, who were forced to withdraw. Vimaladharmasuriya I became the new king of Kandy.

=== Second Portuguese campaign against Jaffna ===
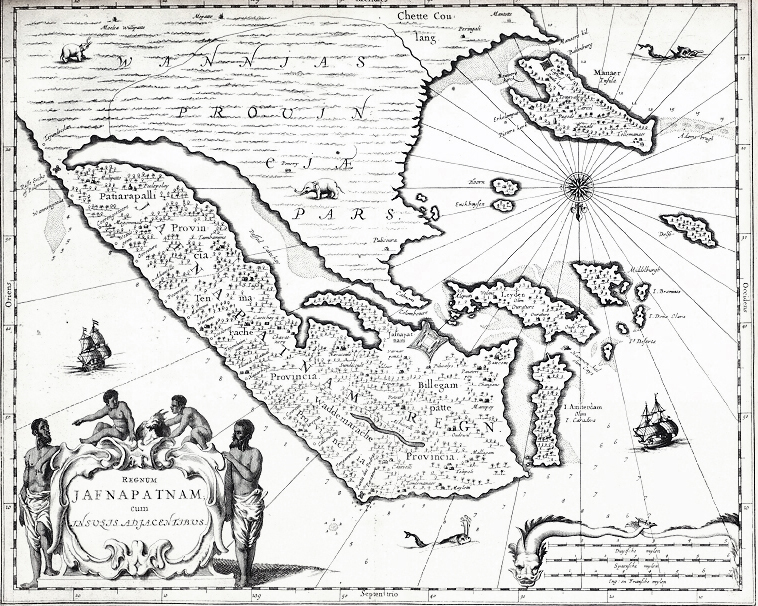
1619 map of the Kingdom of Jaffna

Meanwhile, the Jaffna Kingdom in the north of the island fell increasingly under Portuguese influence. The Portuguese had previously conducted a first campaign against Jaffna where they captured the Mannar Island. In 1591 a Portuguese expedition deposed and killed the Jaffna king Puviraja Pandaram, then installed his son Ethirimana Cinkam as a client ruler.

=== Portuguese conquest of Sitawaka ===
In 1593 Sitawaka forces attempted to re-take Kandy, but were repulsed and their king Rajasinha I died of disease contracted during the fighting. One of the rival claimants to his throne, Jayavira Bandara Mudali, defected to Kotte, and with his support and guidance, the Portuguese captain-major of Ceylon Pedro Homem Pereira set out against Sitawaka with a force of 950 Portuguese and 6000 Sinhalese. The forces of Sitawaka were thrice defeated, first at the Kaduwara fort, then at the Rakgahawatta and Malwana forts using combined land and river operations, and finally at Gurubewira, the Sitawaka fort there being stormed at the end of a bloody struggle. Eventually, the Portuguese marched on the city of Sitawaka and plundered it, obtaining spoils worth 4 million xerafins. The kingdom of Sitawaka submitted thereafter.

=== Campaign of Danture (1594) ===
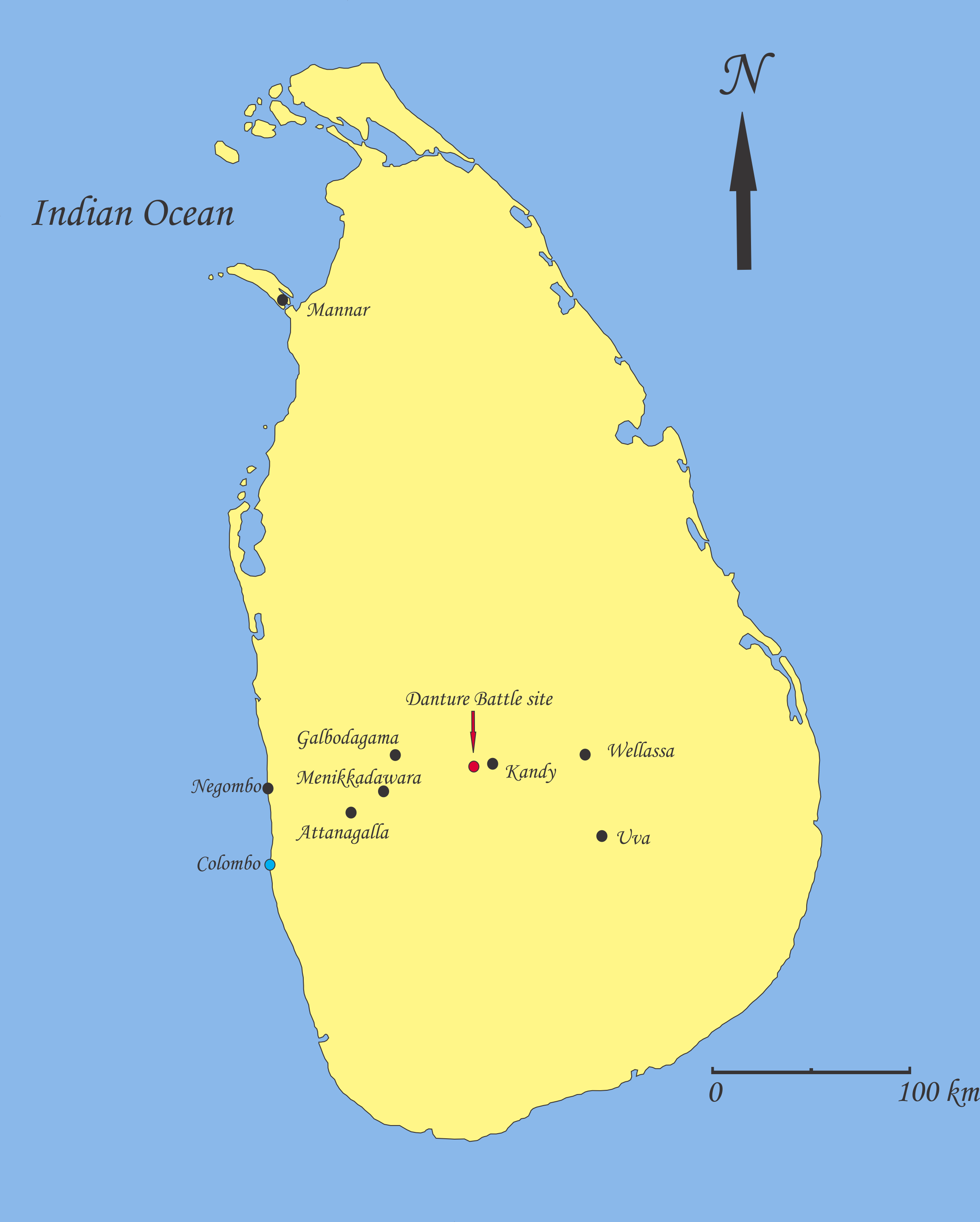
Key locations in the Campaign of Danture, 1594

In 1594 the Portuguese tried again to put their preferred candidate on the throne of Kandy as a client ruler. This time it was Dona Catarina, a Kandyan princess who had been entrusted to the care of the Portuguese and brought up in a Catholic European style. She was then aged ten or twelve.

Pedro Lopes de Sousa led a force of about 20,000 in an invasion of Kandy, of which one thousand were Portuguese troops (the majority transferred from Goa in India for the expedition), 15,400 native Lascarin allies, 47 elephants used as pack animals, (Note: The elephants were used for logistics and not as combat war elephants) and the remainder Badaga mercenaries from India and coolie labourers. The initial number of opposing Kandyan forces is unknown, but is estimated at 10,000. The defenders held a distinct advantage in the terrain, as Kandy is a mountainous region and the invading force would be forced to traverse well-defended mountain passes.

The Portuguese stormed the pass at Balana with heavy losses, after which the Kandyan forces began to retreat. The Portuguese were able to enter the capital Kandy without resistance, finding it abandoned by King Vimaladharmasuriya I. Dona Catarina was crowned as the new ruler of the Kingdom of Kandy. However, she and her Portuguese advisers were unpopular rulers, particularly after rumours spread that she was to be married to a Portuguese husband (as the Portuguese were indeed planning).

Vimaladharmasuriya's forces engaged in guerilla tactics, attacking Portuguese foraging parties and cutting off lines of supply and communication. A large Portuguese-Lascarin raiding party of 3,000 men was surrounded and destroyed in the Uva region. Shortly thereafter, evidence was found that Jayavira Bandara Mudali, one of the Lascarin chieftains, was preparing to betray the Portuguese to Vimaladharmasuriya. Part of this evidence was later shown to be fabricated by Vimaladharmasuriya, but Jayavira was killed as a traitor before this was realised.

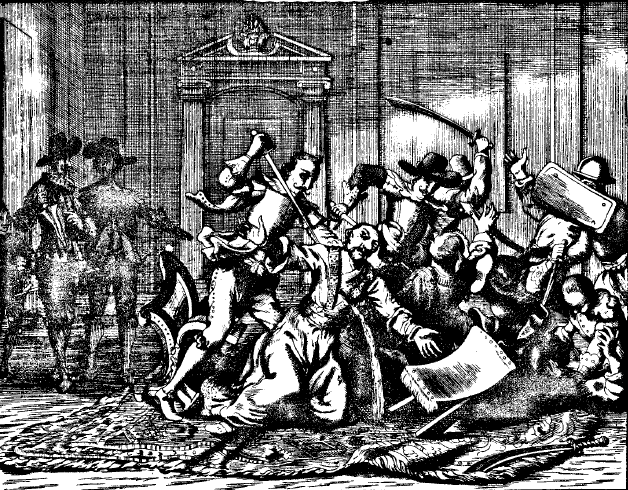
Portuguese soldiers kill the Lascarin leader Jayavira and his attendants, who were suspected of treason (woodcut by Philippus Baldaeus)

The death of Jayavira led many of the Lascarins to desert, along with all of the Badaga mercenaries. Less than a thousand native allies were left with the Portuguese forces, who were now massively outnumbered, lacking supplies, and faced a mass rebellion. The Portuguese attempted to retreat from Kandy to the fort at Balana. Losses to guerilla warfare and further Lascarin desertions reduced their forces to about 360 Portuguese and an equal number of Lascarins by the time they reached Danture. In contrast, defections and troops arriving from other parts of the kingdom had swelled Vimaladharmasuriya's forces to about 20,000 men.

At Danture, the Portuguese forces were attacked as they retreated. The organised columns disintegrated in the forest and most were wiped out. Sousa surrendered with the remaining 93 European troops. In a departure from usual Sinhalese warfare, the prisoners were tortured and mutilated. Sousa died of the wounds he sustained during the fighting. With the exception of a patrol sent back to the lowlands during the early part of the campaign, only three Portuguese soldiers escaped back to Colombo.

Vimaladharmasuriya solidified his control over Kandy by marrying Dona Catarina. In an attempt to prevent further Portuguese incursions he built new fortifications in the Balana pass.

== After Danture (1594–1616) ==
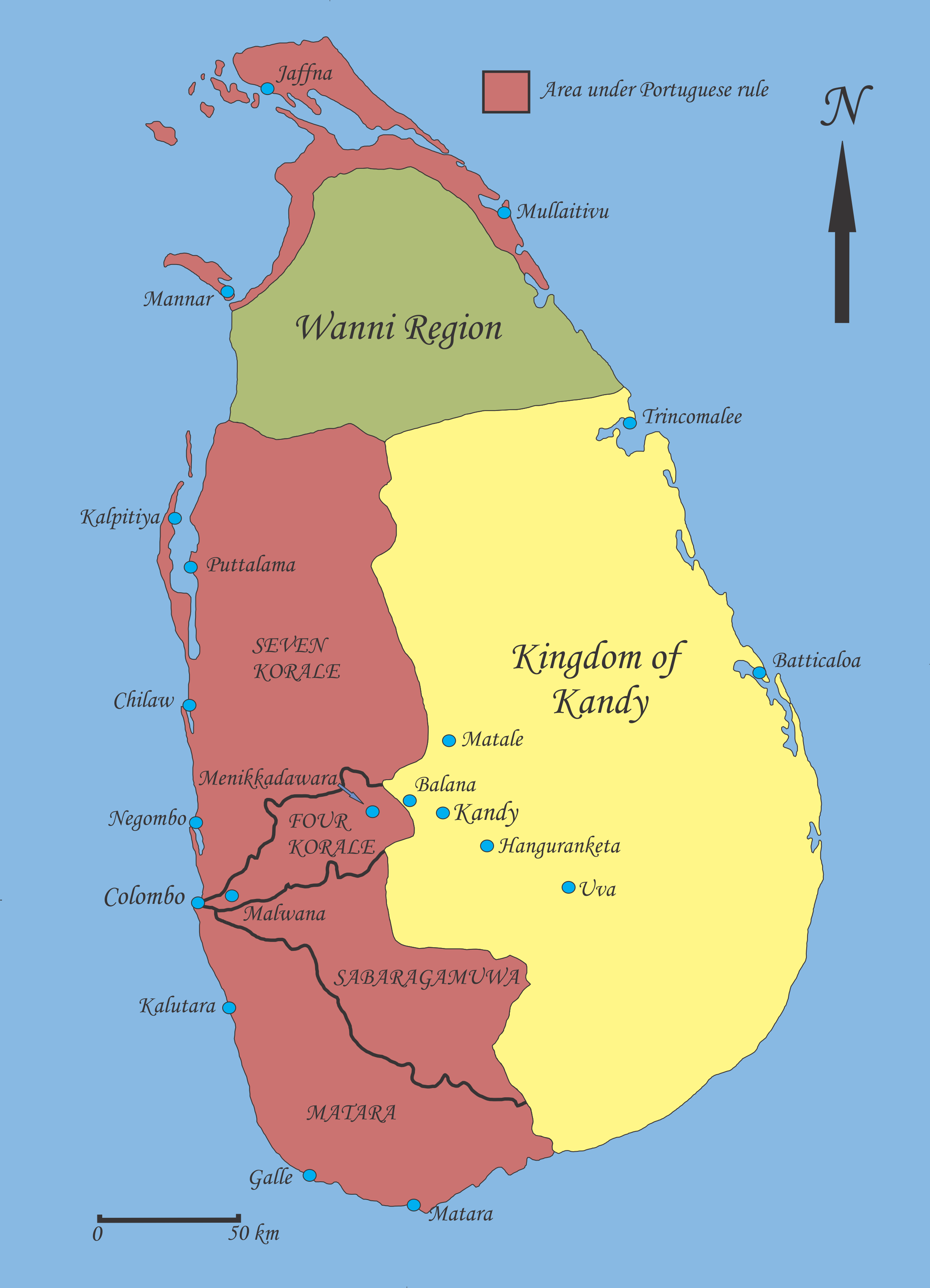
Political situation in Sri Lanka in the early 17th century

With the death of Pedro Lopes de Sousa at Danture, Dom Jerónimo de Azevedo succeeded him as Captain-General of Ceylon, and despite the losses in the battle, Kandy was unable to advance into the lowlands as the Portuguese forts and garrisons remained intact.

Dom Jerónimo proceeded to reform Kotte's provincial administration, dividing it into four provinces, or disavas, each administered by the eponymous disava, with military and judicial powers. The tax system was also reformed and the old system of tributes replaced with fixed mandatory payments. The original military system of castes and levies however, remained organized under the local mudaliar commanders, who assisted the Portuguese troops. Dom Jerónimo also encouraged missionary work by the Jesuits, Augustinians and Dominicans in addition to the Franciscans.

Nevertheless, the defeat at Danture sparked a number of uprisings in Kotte which Dom Jerónimo had to defeat before he could move on Kandy. He considered the defeat of Kandy an utmost priority to secure Sri Lanka and secured Kotte first with the construction of fortified encampments in Matara, Sabaragamuwa, Manikkadawara, and Malwana, where he established the army HQ.

By 1603, Kotte was firmly secured and Dom Jerónimo led his troops into Kandy through the mountain pass, where he seized the Kandian fort at Balana and proceeded towards the city of Kandy itself. However, the kingdom could not be subjugated then due to a rebellion among the Lascarins, and was forced to return to Colombo.

Unable to capture Kandy, Dom Jerónimo adopted a policy of first weakening Kandy through devastating raid warfare by land, twice every year, at harvest time, resorting to light contingents of troops, while blockading the eastern Kandian ports of Trincomalee and Batticaloa by sea, between 1604 and 1612 with considerable success. This coincided with a succession crisis in Kandy after the death of King Vimaladharmasuryia in 1604, that was only solved months later with the succession of his cousin Senarat to the throne.

Senarat proved to be an unpopular ruler and unable to prevent the Portuguese from causing great devastation upon Kandian villages and crops. In 1612, Dom Jerónimo was appointed as the next viceroy of Portuguese India and was succeeded in Sri Lanka by Dom Francisco Meneses (1612–1614), Manuel Mascarenhas Homem (1614–1616), and Dom Nuno Álvares Pereira (1616–1618). Because of his great experience in Sri Lanka, as viceroy Dom Jerónimo de Azevedo kept the Portuguese garrisons well supplied and reinforced, which caused the depopulation of Kandy on account of the systematic Portuguese raids.

== Rebellions, peace treaty and conquest of Jaffna (1616–1621) ==
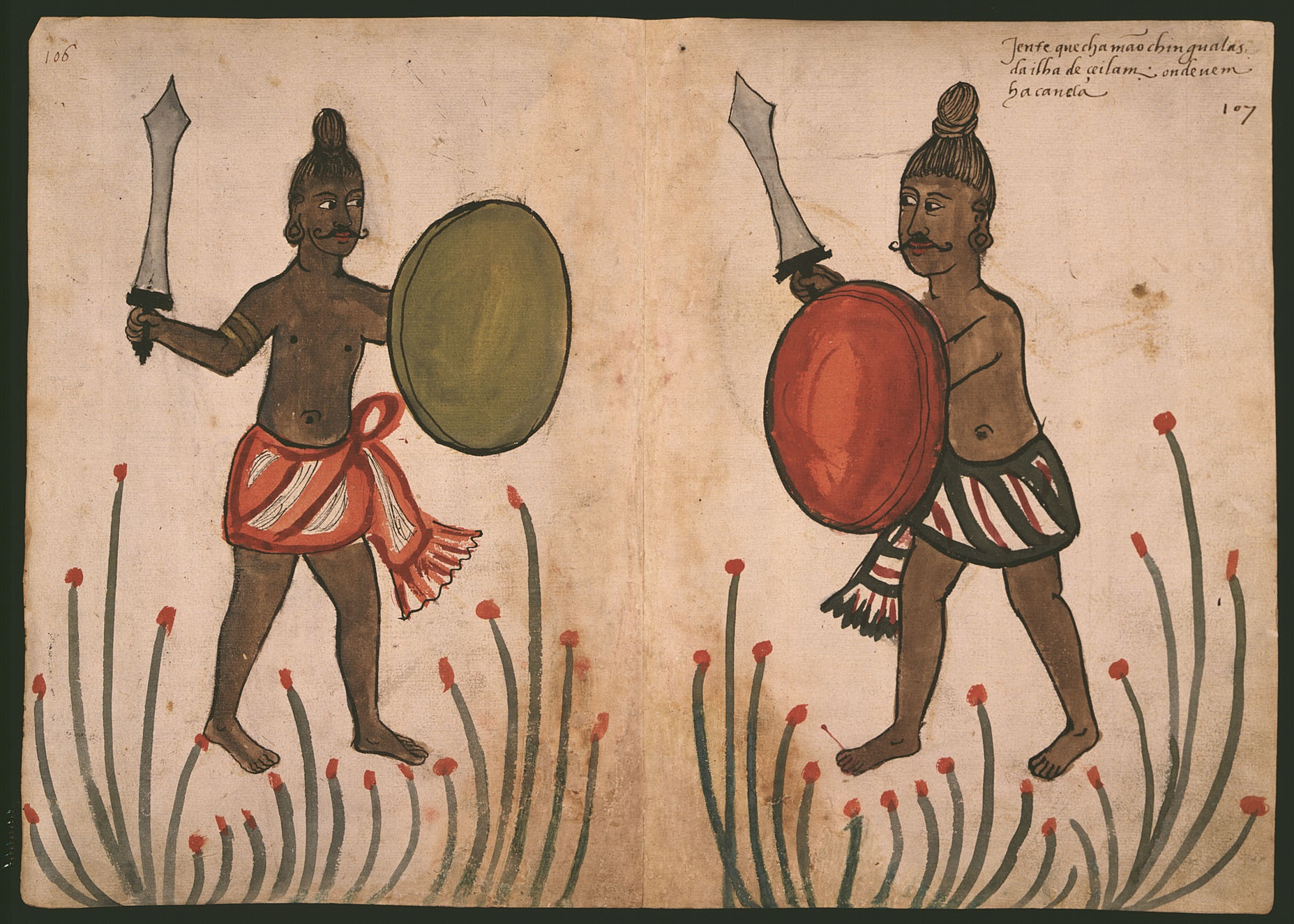
A Portuguese illustration of Sinhalese warriors, produced c. 1540

=== Uprisings in Portuguese territory ===
The taxes imposed by the Portuguese, and the desecration of Buddhist temples by missionaries caused great discontent among the Sinhalese peasantry and in late 1616 an uprising broke out in Sabaragamuwa. Disava Filipe de Oliveira's forces camped in the Seven Korales were dispatched south, but in his absence, in December 1616 a much greater revolt broke out in eastern Seven Korales, led by a disgraced grain measurer who claimed to be the grandson of Rajasinha, late prince Nikapitiya Bendara, dead since 1611. Senarat immediately took the opportunity to support Nikapitiya with a force of 2000 men commanded by the former rebel leader Kangara Aratchi, and the Prince of Uva, Kuruvita Rala, to march his forces southwards into Matara and Sabaragamuwa. Under these conditions, the Portuguese were overwhelmed: part of Sabaragmuwa and Matara were overrun while a considerable portion of the Seven Korales fell to Nikapitiya's rebellion.

=== Rebellion in Kandy ===
Despite initial cordiality, Senarat quickly grew distrustful of Nikapitiyas' success and attitude towards Kandy. Fearing a future rival, he withdrew all his aid and ordered Kuruvita Rala to suspend operations while he attempted to gain a truce with the Portuguese. This in turn caused Kuruvita Rala, a native from Kotte, to rebel in indignation against Senarat, choosing instead to ally with Nikapityia, march against his former ruler, and invite Mayadunne of Denawaka exiled in India to become King of Kandy instead (since his lowly caste disallowed him from crowning himself king). In this regard, C.R. de Silva considers Kuruvita Rala to have been "the true Sinhalese patriot, for it was he who put national above dynastic interests".

Kuruvita Rala, ruling much of southern Sri Lanka including the port of Batticaloa, now posed a much graver threat to Senarat than Nikapitiya. Thus, after recapturing the Balana fort from the Portuguese turned to them for a treaty and an alliance, but only when he released all the Portuguese prisoners was captain-general Dom Nuno Álvares Pereira convinced that Senarat's proposal was genuine.

=== The Luso-Kandian treaty ===
By this sudden turn of events, on August 17 an agreement between the Portuguese and Kandy was reached and a treaty put into effect. In negotiating with the Portuguese, Senarat proved rather capable, refusing most of Portuguese demands but still had to formally pledge vassalage to the King of Portugal, agree not interfere in missionary work in Kandy (Senarat even entrusted his children to be educated by Franciscans), offer several noblemen as hostages in Colombo and pay two large elephants a year as a token tribute. The Portuguese on their part agreed to a formal alliance and recognized Senerat as the rightful King of Kandy.

With the coming of favourable winds in March 1617, important Portuguese reinforcements had arrived in Colombo. In June, developments in Jaffna favoured the Portuguese as Cankili I usurped the throne through a coup and in exchange for Portuguese recognition, agreed to prevent supplies and weapons from reaching the rebels from there. Between July and September the Portuguese were able to recapture the Seven Korales, and Nikapitiya fled to the jungles inhabited by the Vanni in northeastern Sri Lanka, never to be seen again.

=== Portuguese annexation of Jaffna ===
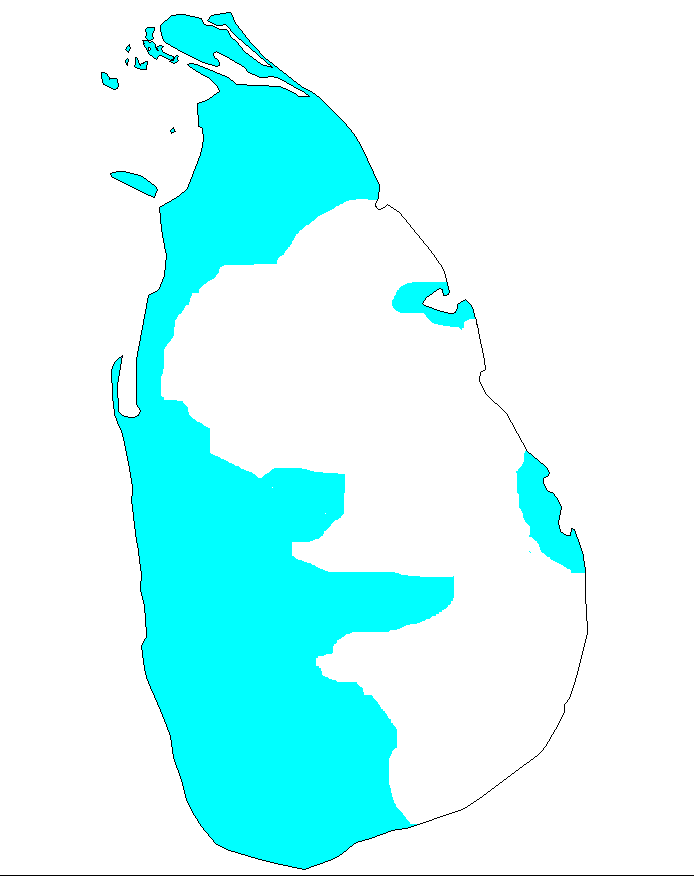
Maximum extent of Portuguese Ceylon (cyan), after the conquest of Jaffna in 1619 and the Vanni Chieftains in 1621

Although the Portuguese confirmed Cankili as the ruler of Jaffna, Cankilis' brutal murder of political rivals made him an unpopular ruler, and incapable of preventing dissatisfaction especially from the rising number of native Christians of the Kingdom. In August 1618, a rebellion instigated by Christian mudaliars Dom Pedro and Dom Luiz and aided by local Portuguese casados evicted Cankili from the throne, but was eventually suppressed with the assistance of 5000 men of the Hindu Nayak of Tanjore, in south-east India. As Cankili was a weak ruler who failed to prevent growing unrest in the kingdom, to pay due tribute to the Portuguese, and was rumoured to be allowing supplies to reach the southern rebels and even seeking aid from the Dutch, in March 1619 the Portuguese captain-general of Ceylon Dom Constantino de Sá decided to dispatch Filipe de Oliveira ahead of 230 Portuguese and 3000 lascarins to subjugate Jaffna. Furthermore, the captain-general had received reports that a Christian Malabarese privateer on the service of the Zamorin, Dom Pedro Rodrigues, was attacking Portuguese and allied shipping in the vicinity of the island of Mannar, and tasked Oliveira to deal with the issue en route.

Upon reaching Mannar, Dom Pedro sailed away, and Oliveira proceeded towards Jaffna. Once there, he demanded the payment of due tributes but as negotiations with Cankili failed, in June the Portuguese-Sinhalese forces of Filipe de Oliveira marched on the capital Nallur, defeated the Tamil forces at Jaffna, captured Cankili and formally annexed Jaffna to the Portuguese Crown. The ancient capital of Jaffna was moved to the coastal city of Jaffna itself (Jafanapatão), and with the kingdom secured from outside threats by February 1621, navigation in the Palk Strait became much safer. Cankili was sent to Goa to face trial, where he was found guilty. However, he agreed to convert before being formally executed.

=== Developments in southern Sri Lanka ===
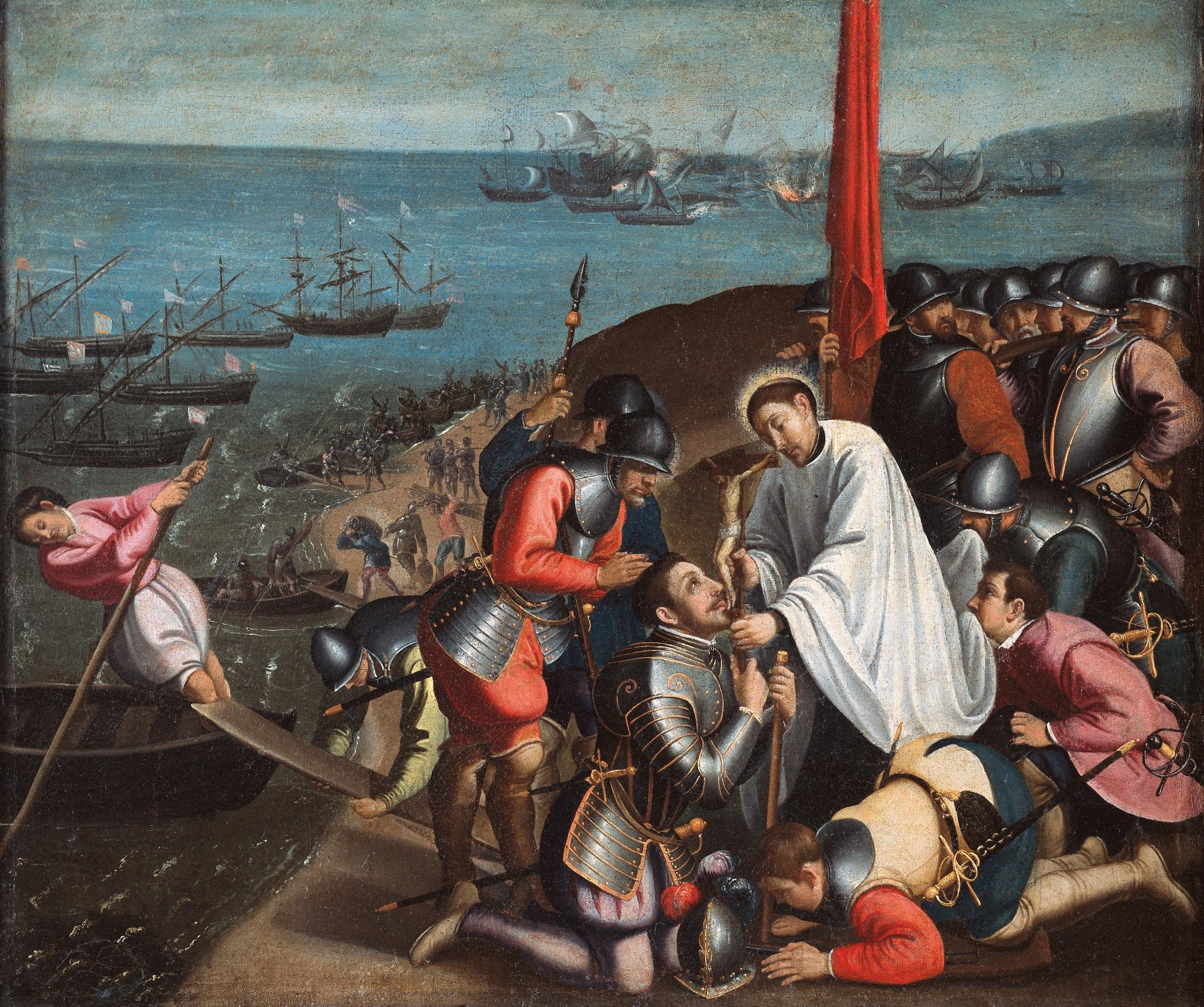
Portuguese soldiers in Asia in the 17th century, painted by André Reinoso

Elsewhere, in early 1620 Senarat achieved another truce – with Mayadunne and Kuruvita Rala – by promising them the throne of Kotte instead. Only by June 1620 did the Portuguese captain-general Dom Constantino de Sá de Noronha manage to recapture the southern lowlands, for Kuruvita Rala was a skilled and popular commander and knew the territory well. A month later, Kuruvita Rala was himself ambushed and killed by the disava of Matara Dom Costantino Barreto (a Christian Sinhalese) in Panama, southeastern Sri Lanka. The departure of Mayadunne of Denawaka back to India in March 1621 brought the end of the rebellion in Kandy, and peace between the Portuguese and Kandy.

=== Danish involvement ===
The second European power to establish a foothold on Sri Lanka were the Danes. Arriving in January 1619 as the first Danish representative, Roland Crappé raided Portuguese-held Jaffna and Nagapattinam, though he was defeated in a naval battle off the coast of Karaikal. In 1620, Senarat received an expedition of the Danish East India Company led by Ove Gjedde, who reached Sri Lanka after a perilous journey of over two years, that claimed more than half its personnel. Senarat was hopeful for a Danish alliance against the Portuguese; he agreed to sign a treaty and grant them the port of Trincomalee, where the great Koneswaram temple was located. However, until the Danish could prove capable against the Portuguese, Senarat was not willing to relinquish his hard-won peace with them or grant the Danes any further concessions. Thus, just two weeks after the treaty was signed, the Danish evacuated Trincomalee and left for Tranquebar in Tanjore, where they established a fort. The Danish fort of Trincomalee was destroyed by the Portuguese in 1622 and they played no further part in the conflict.

== Dutch involvement (1638–1658) ==
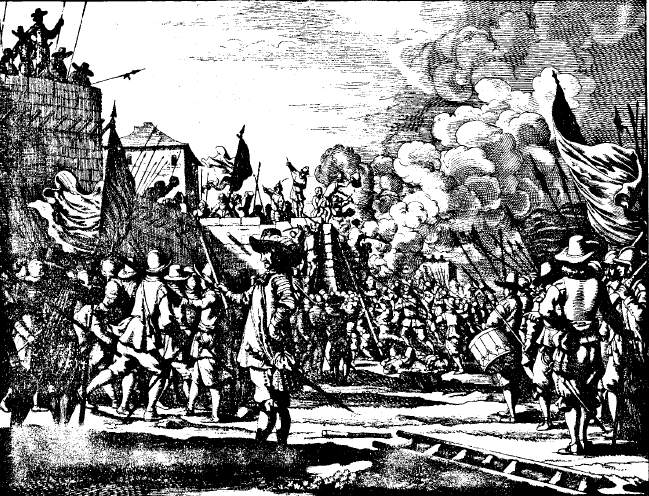
Dutch forces storm the fort of Galle in 1640, by Philippus Baldaeus

The kingdoms of Spain and Portugal had been in dynastic union under the Spanish Habsburgs since a Portuguese succession crisis in 1580. This Iberian Union possessed a vast empire of colonial possessions, but lacked the strength (particularly naval forces) to defend them. Other colonial powers sought to take advantage of this weakness to obtain their own empires, particularly after the collapse of the Iberian economy in 1627. The Spanish overseas possessions were generally better defended than Portuguese ones, which were widely scattered and difficult to reinforce.

The rival Dutch Empire – engaged in the Eighty Years' War against its former master, Spain – concentrated its overseas efforts on conquering parts of the Portuguese Empire in the Dutch–Portuguese War. The Dutch East India Company (VOC) sought to oust the Portuguese from the East Indies and Indian subcontinent so they could control the lucrative spice trade. Seeing an opportunity to undermine the Portuguese on Sri Lanka, the VOC made contact with the Kingdom of Kandy. Confidence in the Kandyan forces rose after they defeated a Portuguese army at the Battle of Gannoruwa in March 1638. Shortly thereafter, the VOC and Rajasinha II of Kandy signed a treaty in May 1638, by which the VOC promised to aid Kandy in its continuing war against the Portuguese in exchange for a monopoly on many trading goods.

The combined VOC and Kandyan forces gradually wore down the Portuguese forces, pushing them out of their strongholds across the island. Batticaloa on the East coast fell to Dutch forces in 1639, then Negombo on the West coast in 1640. Galle was captured after a siege in 1640, providing the Dutch with a port and naval base. However the Kandyans became suspicious of their new allies, correctly believing that the VOC goal was not just to remove the Portuguese from Sri Lanka, but to replace them as the colonial power. The alliance fell apart after a ceasefire was agreed between Dutch and Portuguese forces at some point between 1641 and 1645.

Kandyan forces engaged in skirmishing with both Dutch and Portuguese forces over the following years, but were unable to make inroads. The VOC and Kandy returned to negotiations and reformed their alliance in 1649, albeit on different terms. Meanwhile, the Iberian Union had ended in 1640, depriving the Portuguese colonies of Spanish support. The Peace of Münster in 1648 had ended the Dutch war with Spain (but not Portugal). These developments together acted to free up Dutch forces from other conflicts, allowing them to concentrate on their attacks on Portuguese colonies.

The VOC-Kandy alliance went on the offensive in Sri Lanka from 1652. Whilst Kandy controlled the interior of the island, it was landlocked and the Dutch fleet were able to dominate the coast. Two naval actions were fought between the Dutch and Portuguese on 23 March near Colombo and 2 May 1654 near Goa; the Portuguese won the first battle but lost their entire Indian subcontinent fleet in the second. The Dutch placed the main Portuguese base of Colombo under siege in 1655. Rajasingha no longer trusted the Dutch and insisted that Colombo be ceded to Kandy as soon as it fell. However, when the city finally fell in 1656, the Dutch immediately closed the gates against their ally.

Faced with a complete breakdown in relations with the Dutch, the Kandyan's broke off the alliance and pillaged the area around Colombo. They then retreated back inland and resumed their war with the Dutch, which would continue intermittently for the next century.

The last Portuguese forces were expelled from Sri Lanka entirely in 1658. The VOC was left in control of Colombo and much of the surrounding coastline, forming Dutch Ceylon.

== Aftermath ==
By the end of the war, the Portuguese had lost all of their possessions in Sri Lanka along with their trading rights. Portuguese Ceylon ceased to exist.

The Dutch were left in control of numerous ports and fortifications along the coastline, along with the major population centres of Colombo and Galle. Their possessions on the island were organised into the colony of Dutch Ceylon. Over the following century the colony gradually expanded its holdings in Sri Lanka, and engaged in sporadic warfare with Kandy. Eventually the Kew Letters of 1795 led to the transfer of the Dutch possessions on the island to the British in 1796, forming British Ceylon.

The Kingdom of Kandy retreated to the highlands in the interior and east of the island. They continued to resist European influence on Sri Lanka, engaging in skirmishing and guerilla warfare without making significant inroads into the lowlands. Kandy maintained its independence until 1815 when it ceded its power to the British.

== See also ==
- List of captains of Portuguese Ceylon
- List of captain-majors of Portuguese Ceylon
- List of captain-generals of Portuguese Ceylon
- Forts in Sri Lanka
