= Siege of Colombo (1587–1588) =

- Part of the Sinhalese–Portuguese conflicts
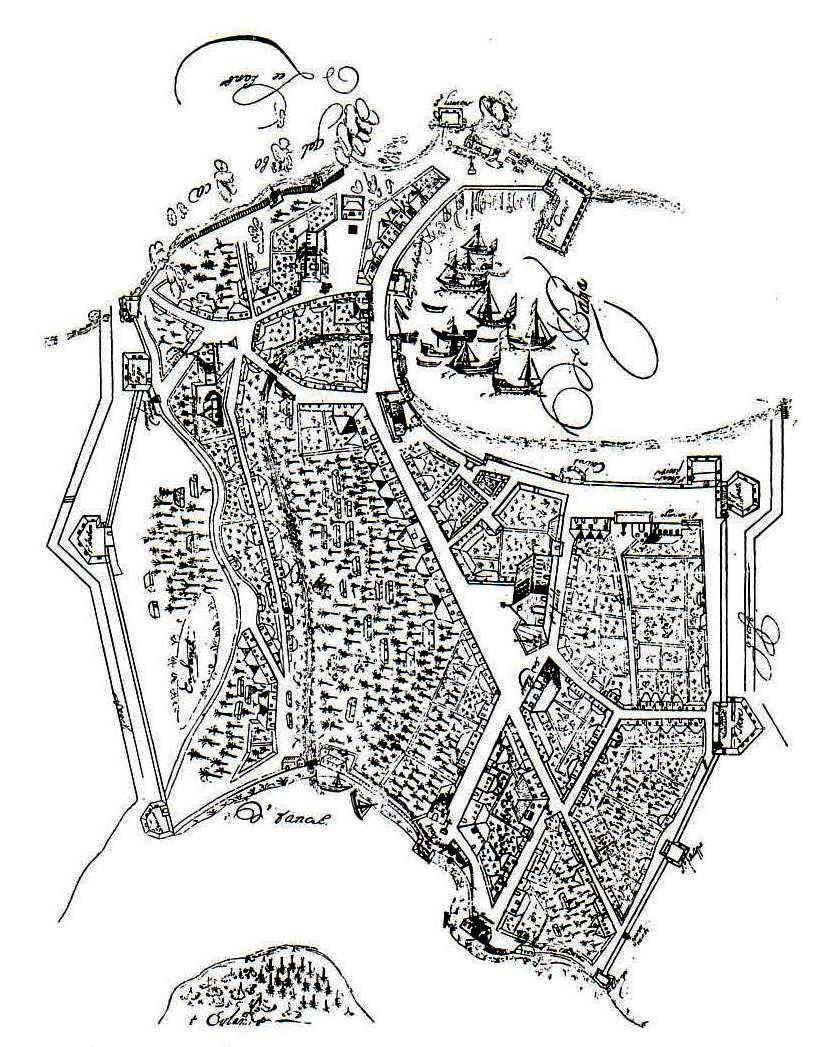
- The Portuguese fortress in Colombo
Date	June 1587 – February 1588
Location	Colombo; Portuguese Ceylon
Result	Portuguese victory

Belligerents
Kingdom of Portugal	Kingdom of Sitawaka

Commanders and leaders
(Portugal) João Correia de Brito (Portugal) Tomé de Sousa Arronches	(Kingdom of Sitawaka) Rajasinha I

Strength
Start of the siege: 300 Portuguese soldiers 700 Lascarins; 1 galley, 5 fustas End of the siege: 2,000 soldiers	50,000 soldiers 2,200 elephants 60,000 servants

Casualties and losses
24 soldiers 80 lascarins 500 civilians	5,000 men

The siege of Colombo from 1587 to 1588 was a military conflict between the Portuguese and the Sinhalese troops of the King of Sitawaka over control of Colombo, on the island of Ceylon, now Sri Lanka.

== Context ==
After having seized control of the Kingdoms of Kotte and Kandy, Rajasinha I, around whom the Sinhalese nobility opposed to the Portuguese were grouped, began to prepare his troops to expel the Portuguese from Ceylon.

When the monsoon of 1587 began, the Portuguese could not receive reinforcements by sea. On 4 June, Rajasinha I established camps with an army of 50.000 warriors, supported by 60.000 servants, 2.200 elephants, including war and cargo elephants, 150 bronze cannons, and 40,000 oxen for transport. At the same time, he ordered the equipment of 65 fustas and 400 smaller vessels to attack the fortress by sea, if necessary.

The captain of the Colombo square was João Correia de Brito, who only had 300 soldiers and 700 lascarins, in addition to a civilian population of around 60.000 that needed to be fed. Correia de Brito had taken precautions so there was no shortage of food. In the port there was a ship sent from Goa with ammunition, but the fortress fleet, led by captain-major Tomé de Sousa Arronches, was stranded ashore due to bad weather. To the south of the fortress, a galleot, a fusta and a balloon (small Asian vessel) had been placed in the lake that served as a moat.

== Siege ==
Rajasinha I began by surrounding the city with a network of entrenchments. Then he ordered a ditch to be dug to drain the water from the lagoon, as he intended to attack the city from that side, where the walls were lower. From Colombo, Captain João Correia sent two tons, small boats, on the Indian mainland and, from there, his crews went overland to the fortresses of Goa, Cochin and Negapatam to warn of the siege and ask for reinforcements.

In the monsoon of 1587 it rained relatively little, which made it easier for Rajasinha I to drain the lake and maintain such a large army on the ground. It took a month for the water to drain, during which skirmishes and artillery duels continued.

Once the shovel work was completed, Rajasinha I summoned his entire army for a show of strength, with flags unfurled, weapons shining in the sun and making a lot of noise. The spectacle was impressive and Captain João Correia realized that his duty was to discourage and intimidate the besieged. He therefore immediately ordered a sortie against the Sinhalese troops closest to the walls, who were taken by surprise and thrown into confusion.

On the night of 3 August, Rajasinha I ordered the first all-out attack. Thousands of Sinhalese launched themselves to climb the mud walls of Colombo, at the same time that the servants, helped by hundreds of elephants, tried to demolish them. They were met with gunfire and the throwing of gunpowder bombs by the Portuguese and the Lascarins. "It was a Dantesque spectacle, in which the adversaries, enveloped by the darkness of the night and the smoke of gunfire, dazzled by the flashes of explosions and fires and deafened by the thunder of artillery and the screams of combatants, only thought of tearing every living thing to pieces that appeared in front of them. Portentous feats of arms, worthy of an Iliad, were performed on that terrible night, both by the Portuguese and the Sinhalese". Some Sinhalese managed to occupy the São Lourenço and São Gonçalo bastions but found themselves driven back by a Portuguese counterattack. The following morning, all the Sinhalese had been forced to retreat, having suffered 400 deaths and 2.000 injuries.

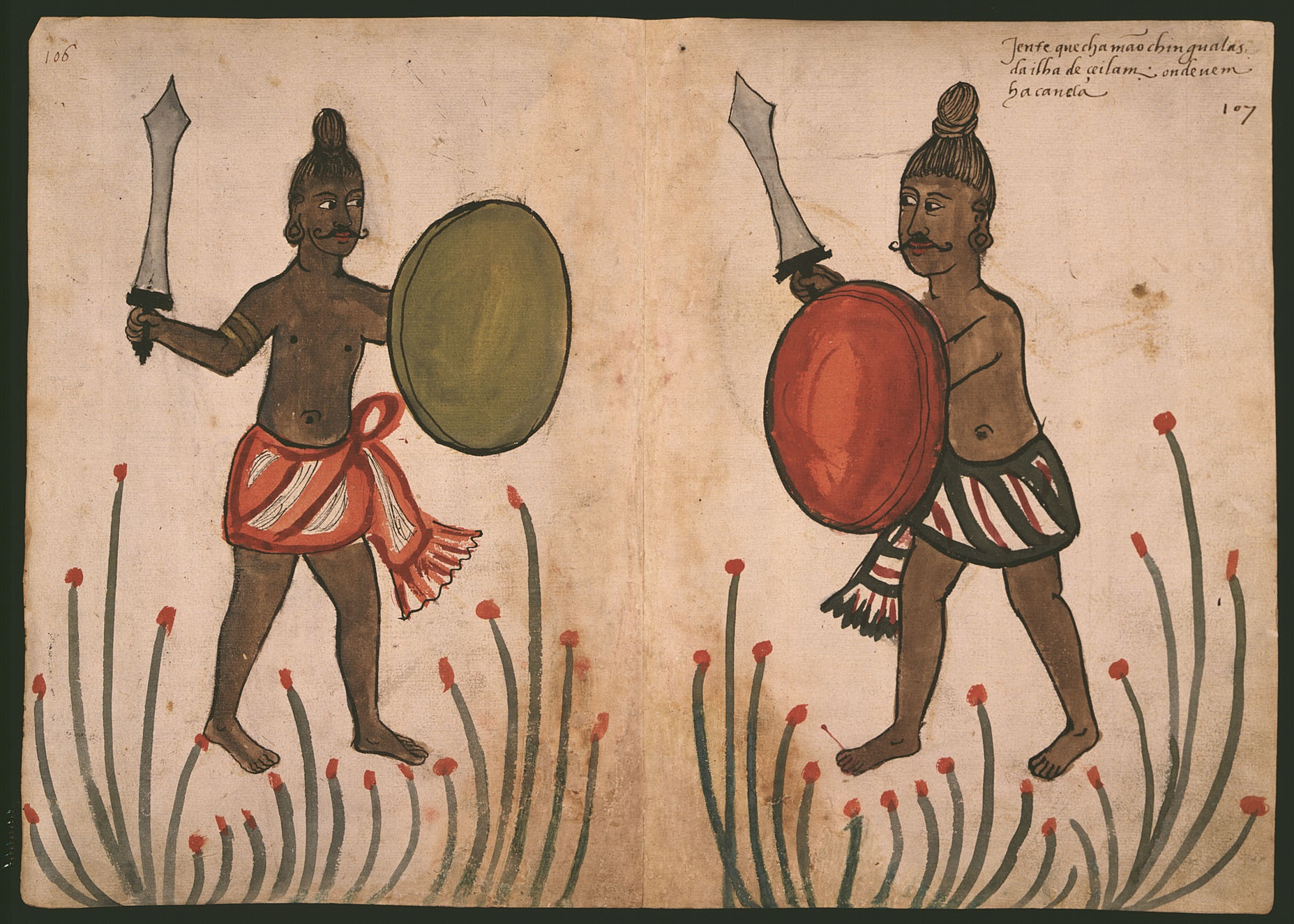
Sinhalese warriors represented in the Códice Casanatense

Rajasinha I launched three more assaults on Colombo in the months that followed, accompanied by shovel work to undermine the walls, while the Portuguese carried out sorties against the Sinhalese positions. Raja Sinha understood that without blocking the city by sea, he would never be able to conquer it from the Portuguese, so, when the monsoon was over, on 4 September he ordered his fleet to go out to sea with a force of 18 fustas, four calemutes and 18 large tonnes. However, Captain-Major Tomé de Sousa went out to meet him with two galleys and 18 fustas; the fight was close but the Portuguese's greater experience in naval warfare and their heavier equipment ended up deciding the fight in their favor.

On 11 September, the first reinforcements from Goa arrived in Colombo: a galley and six fustas with 250 soldiers. More ships with reinforcements arrived on 4 October, 23 October, 4 November and 15 February. Finally, on 18 February, with artillery salutes and the sound of war instruments, a large fleet of 2 galleys, 16 fustas and 600 men, commanded by Manuel de Sousa Coutinho, was founded in Colombo. They had left Goa on 4 February and had put fire and iron on the western coast of Ceylon until reaching Colombo; They were welcomed with the ringing of church bells.

Standard of the Order of Christ, Portuguese naval and war flag

In Colombo there were now 2000 Portuguese soldiers. Realizing that the opportunity to take the city had passed, Rajasinha I abandoned the siege, having lost more than 5000 men.

== Aftermath ==
On the Portuguese side, 24 soldiers and 80 lascarins died, in addition to 500 civilians who were victims of disease.

The siege of Colombo in 1587–1588 was one of the most famous and difficult sieges fought by the Portuguese in the east and is in no way inferior to the sieges of Diu or Chaul.

== See also ==
- Military history of Portugal
- Portuguese India
- Portuguese Ceylon
- Portuguese conquest of the Jaffna Kingdom
