= Battle of Bharuch =

Historical conflict in Gujarat, India

- Part of Gujarati–Portuguese conflicts
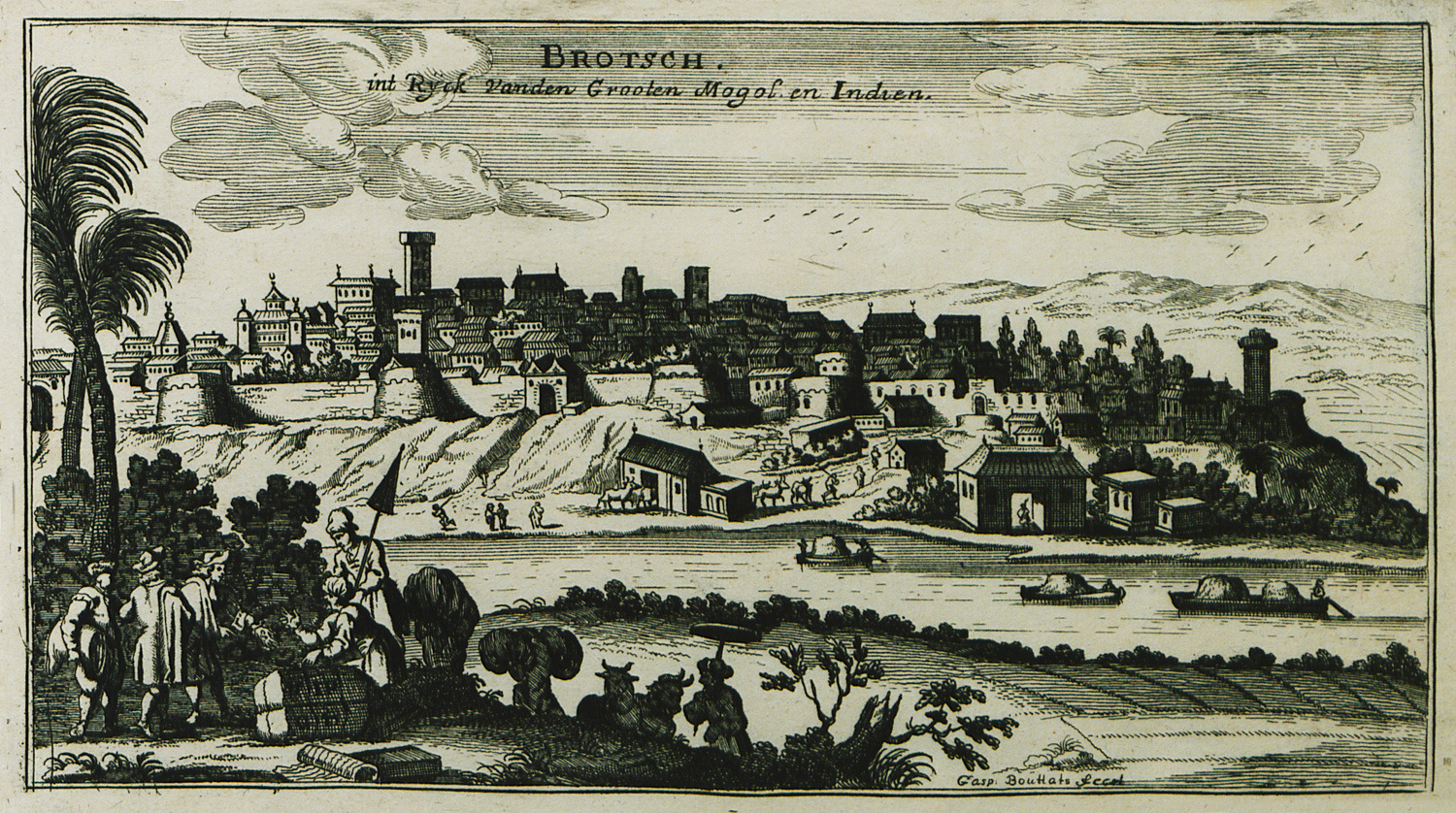
- Broach in an English engraving
Date	1547
Location	Bharuch, India
Result	Portuguese victory

Belligerents
(Kingdom of Portugal) Portuguese Empire	Sultanate of Gujarat

Commanders and leaders
(Kingdom of Portugal) Jorge de Meneses Baroche	Mahmud Shah III

Strength
600 men 10 oarships	5,000 cavalry

Casualties and losses
Few	Heavy

The Battle of Bharuch was a night-time attack of Portuguese forces under the command of Jorge de Meneses Baroche against the city of Bharuch, belonging to the Sultanate of Gujarat, in India. The Portuguese were victorious.

== The battle ==
The Sultanate of Gujarat was at war with the Portuguese Empire ever since the second siege of Diu the previous year. The Portuguese governor of India Dom João de Castro routed the attacking army and detached a fleet under the command of Jorge de Meneses to patrol the coast of Gujarat and capture any vessels transporting supplies and merchandise.

Meneses left Bassein with 10 oarships and a mixed force of 600 men in September 1547. Having collected information from the fishermen of two captured Gujarati vessels that the prosperous city of Bharuch was poorly defended, Meneses determined to sack the city via a daring night-time raid. Its lord was identified by the Portuguese as "Madre Maluco", son-in-law of Khoja Zufar, who had left the city the previous day with the garrison.

The Portuguese managed to sail up the river leading to Broach undected and land divided in three squadrons. The city was then assaulted, sacked and torched. Most inhabitants were killed by the Portuguese or died in the fire, while others fled to the surrounding fields. The cannon which the Portuguese could not be carry away were rendered useless. Upon hearing of the attack, Madre Maluco who was in the region with 5000 horses rushed to the city though to no avail.

== Aftermath ==
Meneses and his men captured ample spoil and afterwards attacked the neighbouring towns and coastal populations. They were received at Goa with celebrations. In honor of the exploit, he adopted the surname Baroche.

Sultan Mahmud Shah III of Gujarat later camped his army of 150,000 men and 80 cannon in the vicinity of Broach to prevent any further Portuguese incursions on the region. Nevertheless, the Portuguese governor of India defiantly landed a force of 3000 men at Broach seeking battle, but following the advice of his officers reembarked upon realizing the Gujaratis unwillingness to fight.

== See also ==
- Portuguese India
- Portuguese military history
- Fort Diu
