= Baltasar Guedes de Sousa =

Captain-major of Portuguese Ceylon (1560 to 1564)

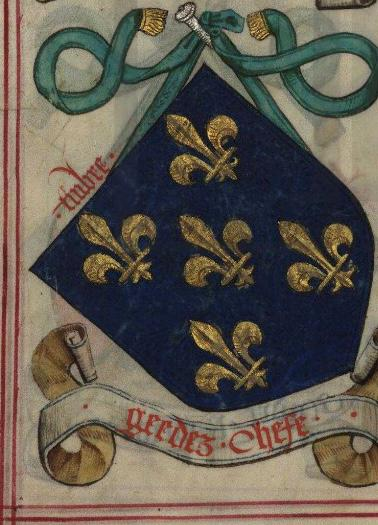
- Coat of arms of the Vaz Guedes family, Lords of Murça in Portugal

7th Captain-major of Portuguese Ceylon
- In office 1560–1564
- Monarch: Sebastian of Portugal
- Preceded by: Jorge de Meneses Baroche
- Succeeded by: Pedro de Ataíde Inferno

Personal details
- Born: Baltazar Vaz Guedes; 1512 Kingdom of Portugal
- Died: 1564 (?) Portuguese India
- Citizenship: Portugal

Military service
- Battles/wars: Sinhalese–Portuguese conflicts

Baltasar Guedes de Sousa, born Baltasar Vaz Guedes, was the 7th Captain-major of Portuguese Ceylon. Guedes de Sousa was appointed in 1560 under Sebastian of Portugal, he was Captain-major until 1564. He was succeeded by Pedro de Ataíde Inferno.

== Biography ==
He was the second-born son of Gonçalo Guedes by his wife Maria Rodrigues de Sousa, and paternal grandson of Gonçalo Vaz Guedes, 3rd Lord of Murça.

He was thus a first cousin of another Gonçalo Vaz Guedes, father of the Portuguese humanist and rector of the University of Coimbra, Friar Diogo de Murça.

He was baptized in 1512 and he took minor orders on September 18, 1529, in Chaves. In 1551, he embarked on the India Armada.

He served in the military in Portuguese India and Ceylon together with his brother, Gonçalo Guedes.

During his tenure, he led several military operations in Colombo and in the Kingdom of Kotte, and was seriously wounded during these battles. It is therefore likely that he died around the year 1564.

The last reference to him in the work of the 17th century Jesuit chronicler Fernão de Queiroz, entitled "Temporal and Spiritual Conquest of Ceylon", mentions him as having fought in the defense of the fortress of Sri Jayawardenepura Kotte, in 1564, in the following terms:

''Captain Balthasar Guedes, anxious to avenge the wounds which he had received and not being able to stand on his legs, from an andor directed, encouraged [the others] and fought, the lack of feet being no obstacle, as he had hands".

== Family ==
Neither he nor his brother Gonçalo married, nor did they leave any known descendants, so the paternal house was inherited by another brother, Gaspar de Sousa Guedes, married to the heiress of the majorat of Bulhão; with descendants in the majorats and later counts of Bertiandos, and in the Lemos family, Lords of Trofa.

Government offices
Preceded by Jorge de Meneses Baroche	Captain-majors of Portuguese Ceylon; 1560-1564	Succeeded by Pedro de Ataíde Inferno
