= João Henriques =

João Henriques may refer to:

- João Henriques (captain-major), Portuguese captain-major of Ceylon in the 1500s
- João Henriques (football manager) (born 1972), Portuguese football manager
