= Pedro de Ataíde Inferno =

Captain-major of Portuguese Ceylon (1564 to 1565)

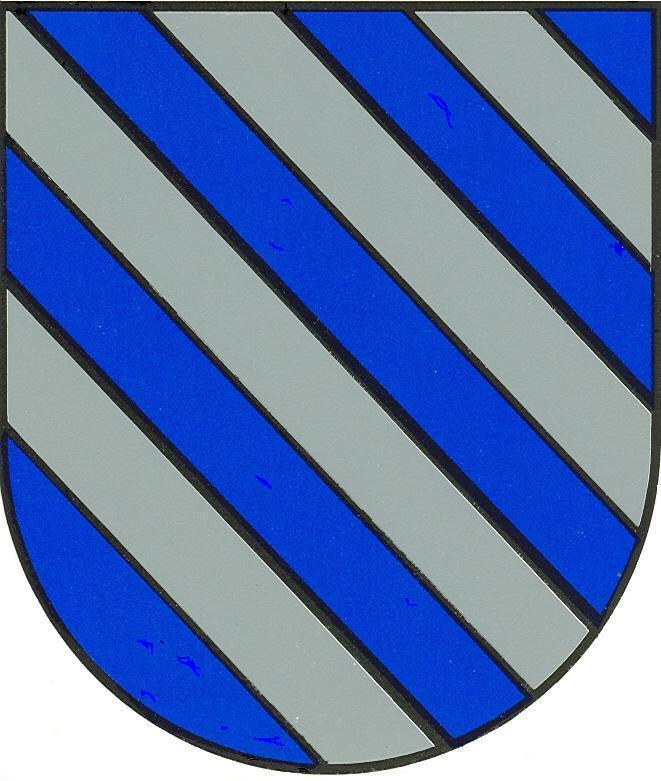
- Coat of arms of the Ataíde family

8th Captain-major of Portuguese Ceylon
- In office 1564–1565
- Monarch: Sebastian of Portugal
- Preceded by: Baltasar Guedes de Sousa
- Succeeded by: Diogo de Melo

Personal details
- Born: Pedro de Ataíde

Pedro de Ataíde "Inferno" was the 8th Captain-major of Portuguese Ceylon. Ataíde Inferno was appointed in 1564 under Sebastian of Portugal, he was Captain-major until 1565.

He was succeeded by Diogo de Melo.

== Biography ==
In a study on Portuguese India published in 1857 by the Portuguese author Francisco Maria Bordalo, he stated that “Pedro de Athaide Inferno” was one of the “Portuguese heroes who died there at the hands of the Moors... or victims of the sea and trials of all kinds”.

According to the Jesuit chronicler Fernão de Queiroz, Ataíde had already participated as captain-major in the defense of the fortress of Sri Jayawardenepura Kotte, in 1564, alongside the previous captain-major, Baltasar Guedes de Sousa, who, although wounded, was also present in the battles against the Sinhalese forces that were trying to conquer the city.

Also according to Queiroz, during this battle Pedro de Ataíde "showed the mettle of his valour gaining the renown of which they robbed him by nicknaming him Hell [Inferno]".

== Family ==
He was the namesake of another Pêro de Ataíde (c. 1450 - 1505), also nicknamed "Hell", captain of the ship São Pedro in the fleet of Pedro Álvares Cabral, who later returned to India in the 4th Portuguese India Armada, commanded by Admiral Vasco da Gama.

Given the similarity of the name and the nickname he received, it is very likely that he was a close relative of this Pêro de Ataíde, perhaps his paternal grandson, who is named in the late 18th century book on Portuguese noble families ("Nobiliário") by Manuel Felgueiras Gaio.

Government offices
Preceded by Baltasar Guedes de Sousa	Captain-majors of Portuguese Ceylon; 1564-1565	Succeeded by Diogo de Melo
