= Simão de Brito =

Portuguese colonial administrator

16th Captain-major of Portuguese Ceylon
- In office 1590–1591
- Monarch: Philip I of Portugal
- Preceded by: João de Correia de Brito
- Succeeded by: Pedro Homem Pereira

Simão de Brito was the 16th Captain-major of Portuguese Ceylon. Brito was appointed in 1590 under Philip I of Portugal, he was Captain-major until 1591. He was succeeded by Pedro Homem Pereira.

Government offices
Preceded by João de Correia de Brito	Captain-majors of Portuguese Ceylon; 1590–1591	Succeeded by Pedro Homem Pereira
