= Pedro Lopes de Sousa =

1st governor of Portuguese Ceylon (1594)

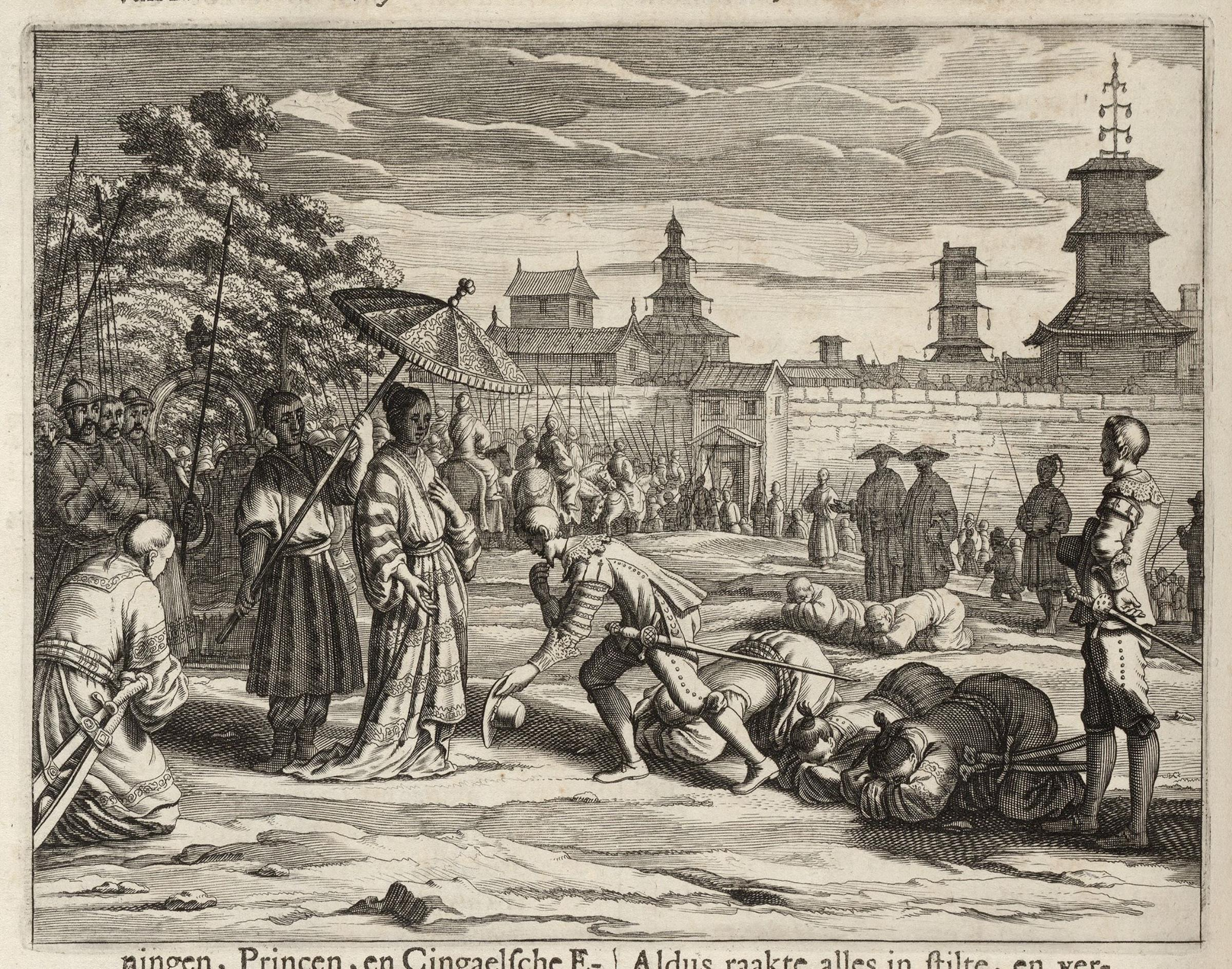
- Pedro Lopes de Sousa welcomes the Empress of Ceylon, Dona Catharina

1st Governor of Portuguese Ceylon
- In office 1594–1594
- Monarch: Philip I of Portugal
- Preceded by: Office created Pedro Homem Pereira (as Captain-major of Portuguese Ceylon)
- Succeeded by: Dom Jerónimo de Azevedo

Personal details
- Born: c. 1540 Bordonhos, Portugal
- Died: 9 October 1594 (aged 53–54) Danture, present day Sri Lanka

Military service
- Allegiance: Kingdom of Portugal
- Battles/wars: Campaign of Danture

Pedro Lopes de Sousa (Bordonhos, Portugal, c. 1540 – Danture, present day Sri Lanka, 1594) was the 1st Governor of Portuguese Ceylon. The office of captain-major was abolished in 1594 and de Sousa was appointed in the same year under Philip I of Portugal. He died that year in the Campaign of Danture.

== Biography ==
He was the second-born son of Diogo Lopes de Sousa, 10th Lord of the town of Bordonhos (near São Pedro do Sul, Portugal) and of the Patronage of its Churches and of his wife and cousin, Dona Isabel de Sousa.

The exact date of his birth is unknown, but as he had at least two older brothers, the first of whom was born in the mid-1530s, it is likely that it occurred around 1540.

He made his career in the Portuguese Estado da India, where he served as captain of Malacca.

In 1594, following political developments in Ceylon – which the Portuguese crown interpreted as an opportunity to extend Portuguese rule to the entire territory of the island, namely through the subjugation of the Kingdom of Kandy, which until then had successfully resisted the expansion of the Portuguese – Pedro Lopes de Sousa was appointed to the new post of capitão-geral da conquista do Ceilão ("captain-general of the conquest of Ceylon" – the maximum representatives of the Portuguese crown in Ceylon, based in Kotte, had used the designation of "Captain" between 1518 and 1551 and that of "Captain-major" after that date).

He arrived in Colombo from Goa, with fresh troops to reinforce the Portuguese military potential, in May 1594.

A few months later, he commanded an army composed of Portuguese and local auxiliaries, known by the name of Lascarins, which invaded the Kingdom of Kandy, with the aim of placing on the throne the legitimate queen, Dona Catarina – a child in her early teens, who was under Portuguese protection and had changed her birth name from Kusumasani Devi when she was baptized.

The first phase of this ambitious military and political operation was largely successful: the king of Kandy, Vimaladharmasurya, who had recently usurped the throne, fled to the mountains around the capital and Pedro Lopes de Sousa was thus able to install his Protégé, the princess Dona Catarina, on the Kingdom's throne.

This initial success, however, would not last long. The Portuguese made it difficult for the population of Kandy to have access to the queen – and this caused rumors to circulate, accusing the Portuguese of planning to have Dona Catarina marry a Portuguese nobleman (perhaps the governor himself). This created a climate of general anxiety and dissatisfaction among the people and the ruling elite of Kandy. In addition, Pedro Lopes de Sousa had the main commander of the Lascarins executed, on suspicion of being in collusion with Vimaladharmasurya. This execution led to the immediate mass desertion of the Lascarin auxiliaries of the Portuguese army.

Faced with a new reality in the correlation of military force, which had become highly unfavorable for the Portuguese, Lopes de Sousa decided that the only viable option would be to withdraw as quickly as possible from the capital of Kandy. But Vimaladharmasurya's army followed his withdrawal closely, cut off his retreat at Danture, near the capital, and annihilated the Portuguese army, including its commander, on 9 October 1594.

The Battle of Danture was an important turning point in the History of the Kingdom of Kandy. It ensured an independence that Kandy would be able to keep for more than two centuries – despite repeated attempts at annexation by Portugal, and later by the Netherlands and the British Empire – until the year 1815.

The Portuguese crown reacted to the defeat at Danture with the appointment of a new captain-general (D. Jerónimo de Azevedo) who arrived in Colombo, with military reinforcements, in December 1594.

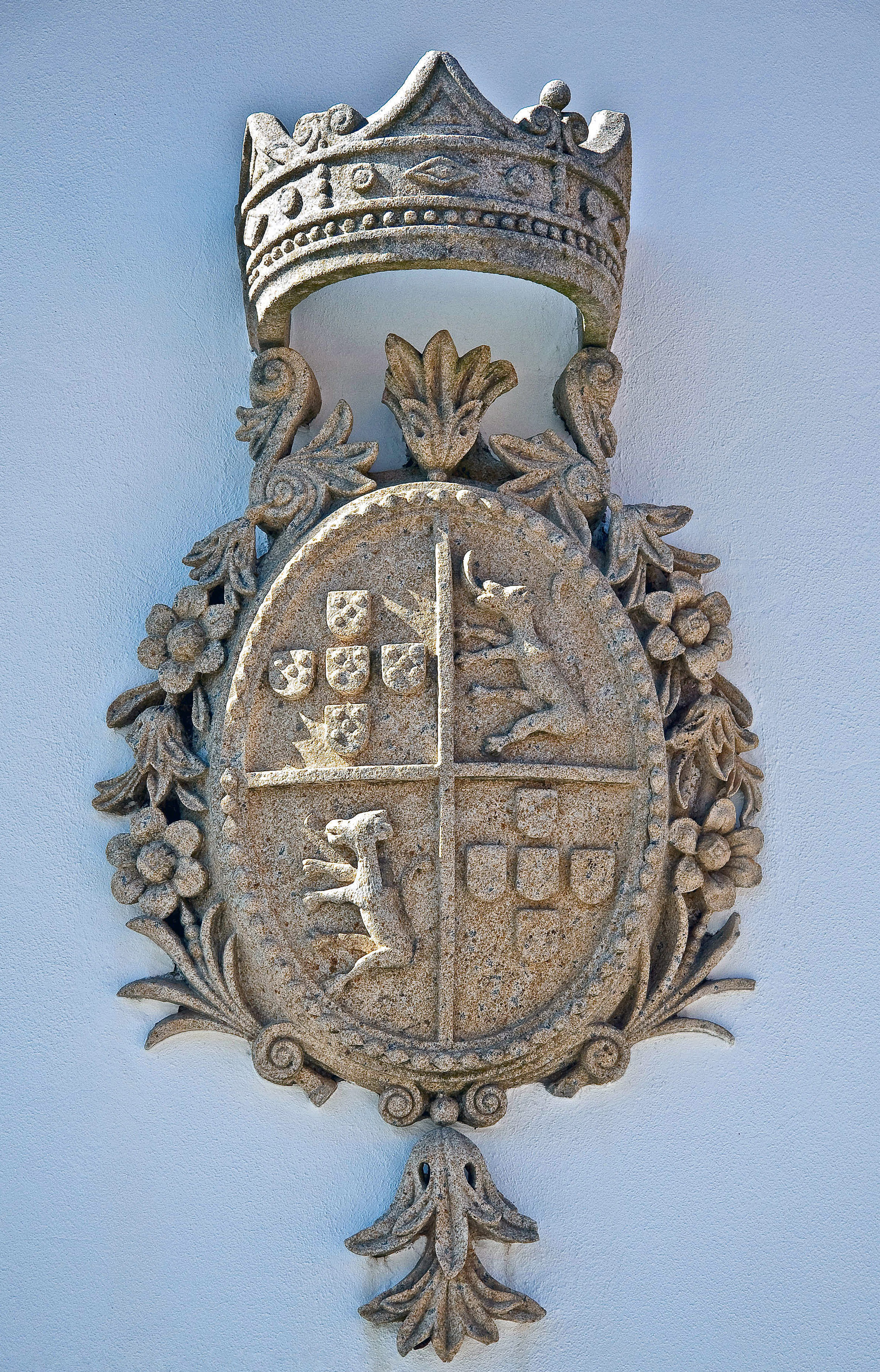
Coat of Arms of the Lopes de Sousa, Lords of Bordonhos in Portugal

== Marriage and children ==
He married twice.

His first wife was Bárbara de Melo, daughter of Gaspar de Melo São Payo (or Sampaio) and great-niece of Fernão Vaz de Sampaio, lord of the house of Vila Flor. Their son, Diogo Lopes de Sousa, was wounded in the battle of Danture and later died of these wounds. He left no issue.

His second wife was Dona Brites de Ataíde, daughter of Dom Diogo de Ataíde, captain of Baçaim (who was the paternal grandson of Dom Álvaro de Ataíde, lord of the towns of Castanheira, Povos and Cheleiros and great-grandson of the 1st Count of Atouguia) and his wife Maria Antunes, with the following offspring:

- Fradique Lopes de Sousa, captain of Malacca.
- Dona Isabel de Sousa, who married Jorge de Albuquerque, son of the governor of Estado da India, Fernão de Albuquerque, with issue.

Government offices
Preceded by Office created Pedro Homem Pereira (as Captain-major of Portuguese Ceylon)	Governor of Portuguese Ceylon; 1594-1594	Succeeded by Jerónimo de Azevedo
