= Antão de Noronha =

Portuguese Viceroy of India in the 16th century

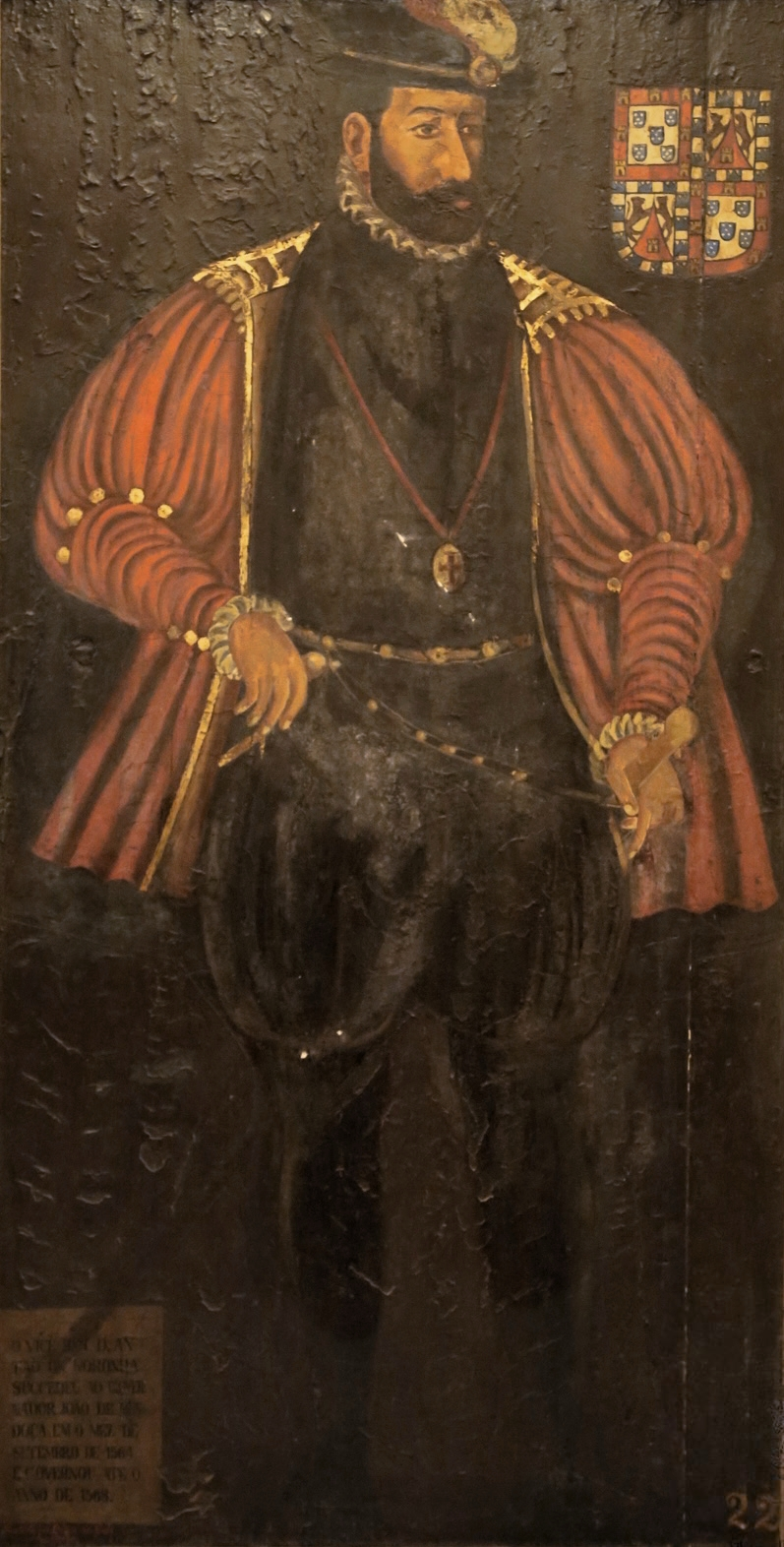

25th Viceroy of Portuguese India
- In office 3 September 1564 – September 1568
- Monarch: Sebastian I of Portugal
- Preceded by: João de Mendonça
- Succeeded by: Luís de Ataíde

Personal details
- Born: 1520
- Died: 1569 (aged 48–49)
- Relations: João de Noronha (father); Afonso de Noronha (uncle)

D. Antão de Noronha was appointed in 1564 under Sebastian of Portugal as viceroy of India. Previously, he served at Ceuta in the 1540s and had been captaining at Hormuz in the 1550s. He was the illegitimate son of João de Noronha and nephew of viceroy Afonso de Noronha (1550–1554). Antão de Noronha was also the Viceroy of Portuguese India between 3 September 1564 and September 1568. He captured Mangalore and built a fort there in 1568. He died in 1569 on board in his voyage back to Portugal.

== Bibliography ==
- D. Antão de Noronha. Esboço do percurso biográfico de um vice-rei da Índia. 1520-1569, por Nelson Moreira Antão
- Vila-Santa, Nuno, "O Vice-Reinado de D. Antão de Noronha (1564–1568) no contexto da crise do Estado da Índia de 1565–1575", Anais de História de Além-Mar, vol. XI, Lisboa/Ponta Delgada, 2010, pp. 63–101.

Government offices
Preceded by Diogo de Melo Coutinho	Captain-majors of Portuguese Ceylon; 1572-1575	Succeeded by Fernando de Albuquerque
Preceded by João de Mendonça	Viceroy of India; 1564-1568	Succeeded by Luís de Ataíde
