= Jorge de Meneses Baroche =

6th Captain-major of Portuguese Ceylon
- In office 1559–1560
- Monarch: Sebastian of Portugal
- Preceded by: Afonso Pereira de Lacerda
- Succeeded by: Baltasar Guedes de Sousa

Jorge de Meneses Baroche was the 6th Captain-major of Portuguese Ceylon. Baroche was appointed in 1559 under Sebastian of Portugal, he was Captain-major until 1560. He was succeeded by Baltasar Guedes de Sousa.

== See also ==
- Gujarati-Portuguese conflicts
- Sinhalese-Portuguese conflicts

Government offices
| Preceded by Afonso Pereira de Lacerda | Captain-majors of Portuguese Ceylon; 1559-1560 | Succeeded by Baltasar Guedes de Sousa |
