= Fernando de Albuquerque =

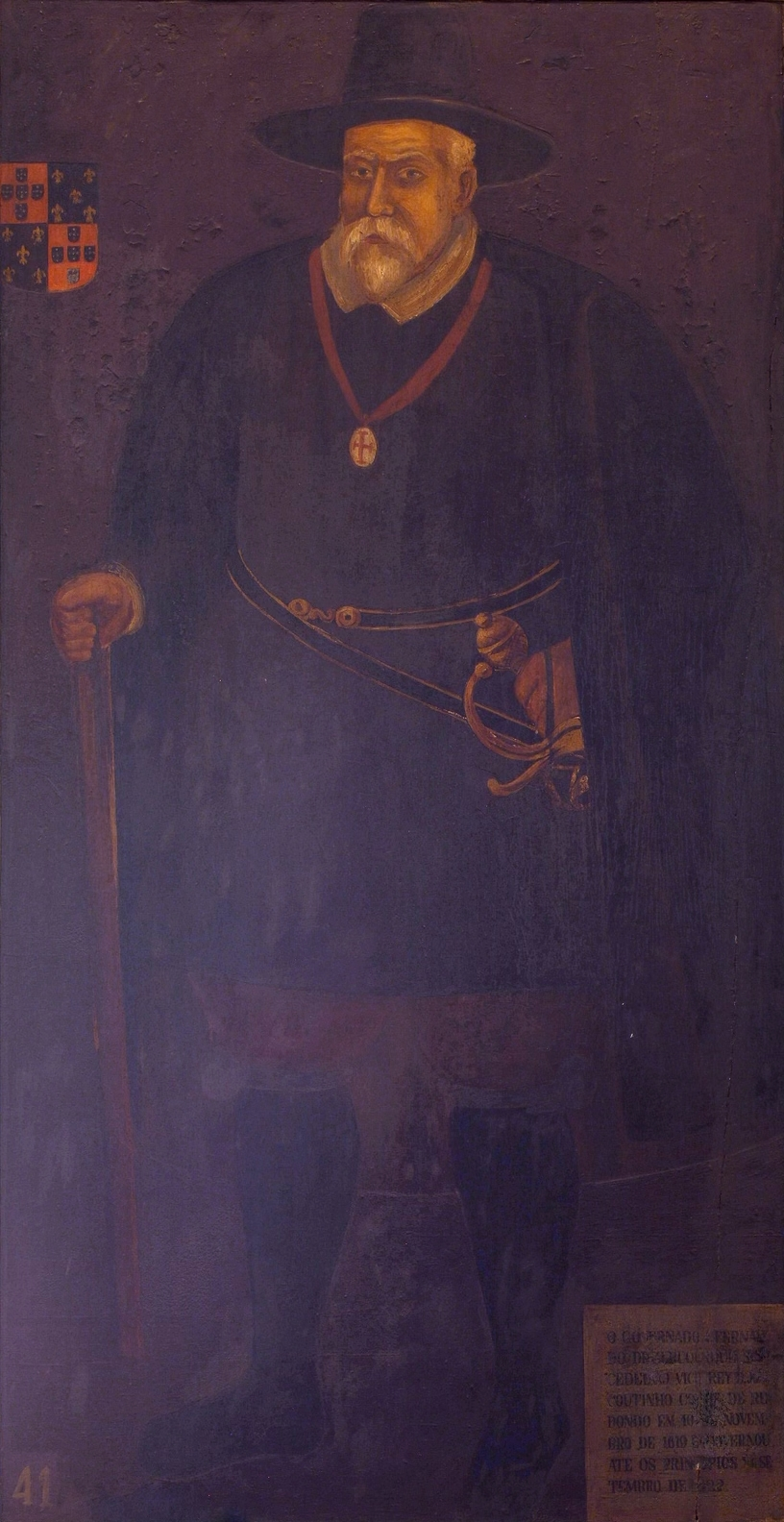
- Portrait in the Archaeological Survey of India, Goa

41st Governor of Portuguese India
- In office 1619–1622
- Monarch: Philip II of Portugal
- Preceded by: João Coutinho
- Succeeded by: Francisco da Gama, 4th Count of Vidigueira

13th Captain-major of Portuguese Ceylon
- In office 1575–1578
- Monarch: Sebastian of Portugal
- Preceded by: António de Noronha
- Succeeded by: Manuel de Sousa Coutinho

Personal details
- Born: c. 1550 Barcelos, Portugal
- Died: 1623 Portuguese India
- Resting place: Church of Nossa Senhora da Serra, Goa
- Parent(s): Estevao de Brito and Guiomar de Castro

Fernando de Albuquerque (c. 1550 – 1623) was a Portuguese colonial administrator. He was captain-major of Malacca, 13th captain-major of Ceylon and captain of Daman and Goa, before being appointed 41st Governor of India in 1619.

Government offices
Preceded by António de Noronha	Captain-majors of Portuguese Ceylon; 1575-1578	Succeeded by Manuel de Sousa Coutinho
