= Diogo de Melo Coutinho =

2nd & 11th Captain-major of Portuguese Ceylon
- In office 1552–1552
- Monarch: John III of Portugal
- Preceded by: João Henriques
- Succeeded by: Duarte de Eça
- In office 1570–1572
- Monarch: Sebastian of Portugal
- Preceded by: Fernando de Monroy
- Succeeded by: António de Noronha

Diogo de Melo Coutinho was the second and eleventh Captain-major of Portuguese Ceylon. Coutinho was first appointed in 1552 under John III of Portugal, he was Captain-major until 1552. His second term lasted from 1570 to 1572. He was succeeded by Duarte de Eça and António de Noronha respectively.

In July 1565 he was Captain of Colombo, in which capacity he was sent to reduce the Sri Lankan city of Jayawardhana Kotte, and evacuate its citizens to Colombo. After this, the Kingdom of Kotte ceased to exist.

Diogo was also the husband of Dona Isabel Pereira and the father of Dona Luisa de Melo Coutinho, who after his death set out to return to Portugal but were wrecked in 1593 in the Santo Alberto on the coast of Natal. After an 850-mile trek to the safety of Mozambique, they again took ship for Portugal, this time on the carrack Cinco Chagas, only to meet with an attack by three English ships off Faial in the Azores, which resulted in their deaths and the total destruction of the carrack in the Action of Faial in June 1594.

Government offices
Preceded by João Henriques	Captain-majors of Portuguese Ceylon; 1552-1552	Succeeded by Duarte de Eça
Preceded by Fernando de Monroy	Captain-majors of Portuguese Ceylon; 1570-1572	Succeeded by António de Noronha
