= Fernando de Monroy =

10th Captain-major of Portuguese Ceylon
- In office 1568–1570
- Monarch: Sebastian of Portugal
- Preceded by: Diogo de Melo
- Succeeded by: Diogo de Melo Coutinho

Fernando de Monroy was the 10th Captain-major of Portuguese Ceylon. Monroy was appointed in 1568 under Sebastian of Portugal, he was Captain-major until 1570. He was succeeded by Diogo de Melo Coutinho.

Government offices
Preceded by Diogo de Melo	Captain-majors of Portuguese Ceylon; 1568-1570	Succeeded by Diogo de Melo Coutinho
