= Duarte de Eça =

3rd Captain-major of Portuguese Ceylon
- In office 1552–1553
- Monarch: John III of Portugal
- Preceded by: Diogo de Melo Coutinho
- Succeeded by: Fernão Carvalho

Personal details
- Born: 1480
- Died: Unknown

Duarte de Eça (born c. 1480) was the 3rd Captain-major of Portuguese Ceylon. Eça was appointed in 1552 under John III of Portugal, he was Captain-major until 1553. He was succeeded by Fernão Carvalho.

== Bibliography ==
Vila-Santa, Nuno, "A trajectória de D. Duarte de Eça: de capitão deposto a capitão de Goa", Actas do Congresso Internacional Pequena Nobreza nos Impérios Ibéricos do Antigo Regime, IICT, 2012.

Government offices
Preceded by Diogo de Melo Coutinho	Captain-majors of Portuguese Ceylon; 1552-1553	Succeeded by Fernão Carvalho
