= Diogo de Melo =

9th Captain-major of Portuguese Ceylon
- In office 1565–1568
- Monarch: Sebastian of Portugal
- Preceded by: Pedro de Ataíde Inferno
- Succeeded by: Fernando de Monroy

Diogo de Melo was the 9th Captain-major of Portuguese Ceylon. Melo was appointed in 1565 during the reign of King Sebastian of Portugal and served until 1568. He was succeeded by Fernando de Monroy.

Government offices
Preceded by Pedro de Ataíde Inferno	Captain-majors of Portuguese Ceylon; 1565-1568	Succeeded by Fernando de Monroy
