= Fernão Carvalho =

4th Captain-major of Portuguese Ceylon
- In office 1553–1555
- Monarch: John III of Portugal
- Preceded by: Duarte de Eça
- Succeeded by: Afonso Pereira de Lacerda

Fernão Carvalho was the 4th Captain-major of Portuguese Ceylon. Carvalho was appointed in 1553 under John III of Portugal, he was Captain-major until 1555. He was succeeded by Afonso Pereira de Lacerda.

Government offices
Preceded by Duarte de Eça	Captain-majors of Portuguese Ceylon; 1553-1555	Succeeded by Afonso Pereira de Lacerda
