= Crisis of the Sixteenth Century =

Period of Sri Lankan history from 1521 to 1597

The Crisis of the Sixteenth Century was the later part of the Transitional period of Sri Lanka, that began with the decline of the Kingdom of Kotte, with the Vijayabā Kollaya (the spoiling of Vijayabahu) in 1521, culminated in the collapse of the Kingdom of Sitawaka, and with Portuguese dominance of Sri Lankan coasts, if not control by 1597, over two of three kingdoms that had existed at the start of the century. The Kingdom of Kandy was the only independent Sinhalese kingdom to survive. The period was characterised by the fragmentation of the Sinhalese polity, intervention of foreign forces and constant military conflict.

== See also ==
- Crisis of the Third Century – a similar period in Roman history
- Sengoku period – a similar period in Japanese history
- Warring States period – a similar period in Chinese history
