= João Henriques (captain-major) =

1st Captain-major of Portuguese Ceylon
- In office 1551–1552
- Monarch: John III of Portugal
- Preceded by: Office created
- Succeeded by: Diogo de Melo Coutinho

João Henriques was the first Captain-major of Portuguese Ceylon. Henriques was appointed in 1551 under John III of Portugal, he was Captain-major until 1551. He was succeeded by Diogo de Melo Coutinho.

Government offices
| Preceded by Office created | Captain-majors of Portuguese Ceylon; 1551-1552 | Succeeded by Diogo de Melo Coutinho |
