= Afonso Pereira de Lacerda =

Fifth captain-major of Portuguese Ceylon

5th Captain-major of Portuguese Ceylon
- In office 1555–1559
- Monarchs: John III of Portugal; Sebastian of Portugal
- Preceded by: Fernão Carvalho
- Succeeded by: Jorge de Meneses Baroche

Afonso Pereira de Lacerda was the fifth captain-major of Portuguese Ceylon. Lacerda was appointed in 1555 under Sebastian of Portugal. He served as captain-major until 1559. He was succeeded by Jorge de Meneses Baroche.

Government offices
Preceded by Fernão Carvalho	Captain-majors of Portuguese Ceylon; 1555-1559	Succeeded by Jorge de Meneses Baroche
