= Manuel de Sousa Coutinho =

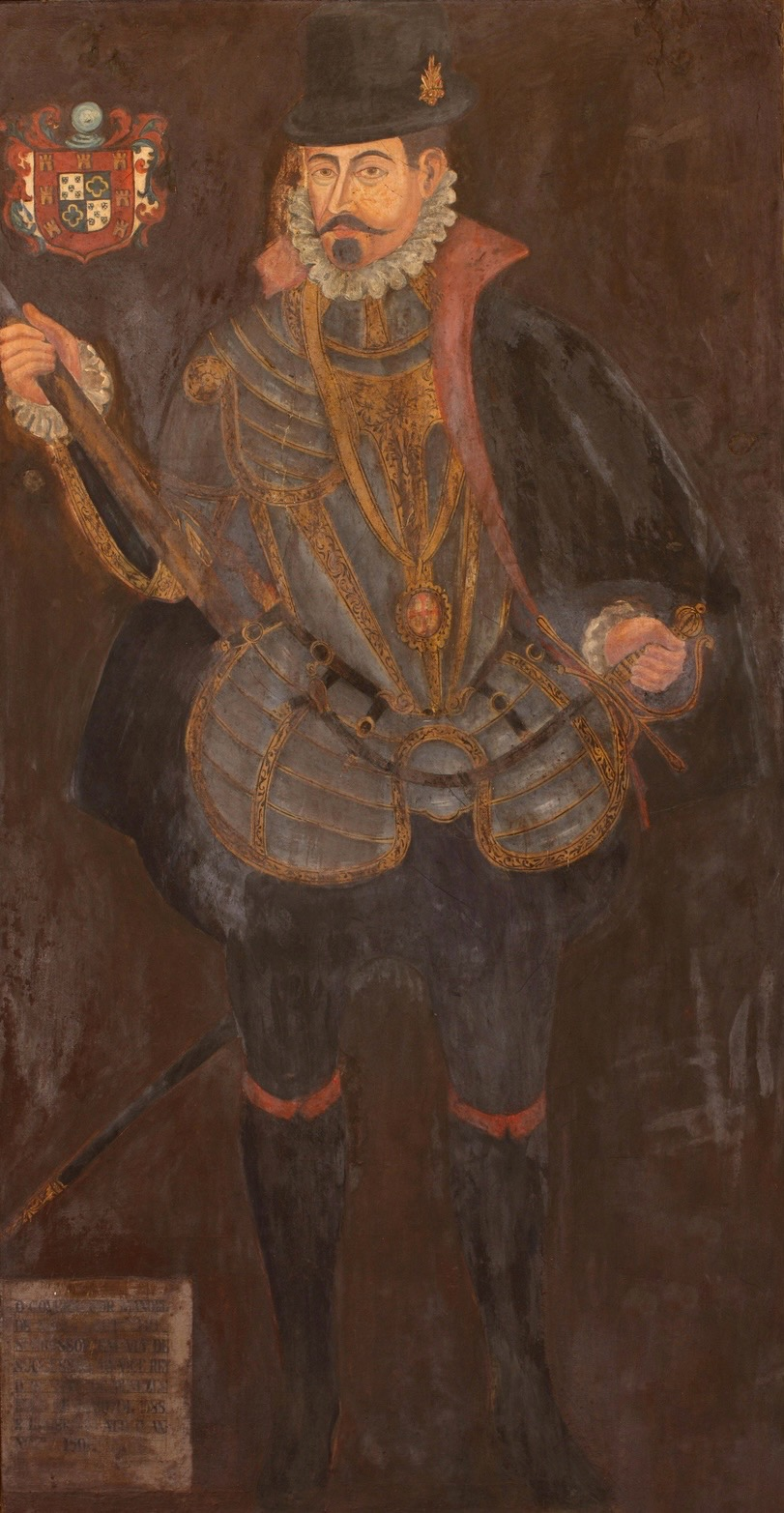

14th Captain-major of Portuguese Ceylon
- In office 1578–1583
- Monarchs: Sebastian of Portugal; Henry, King of Portugal; Philip I of Portugal
- Preceded by: Fernando de Albuquerque
- Succeeded by: João de Correia de Brito

Personal details
- Born: 1540
- Died: 1591 (aged 50–51)

Manuel de Sousa Coutinho (1540–1591) was the 14th Captain-major of Portuguese Ceylon. Coutinho was appointed in 1578 under Sebastian of Portugal, he was Captain-major until 1583. He was succeeded by João de Correia de Brito.

Government offices
Preceded by Fernando de Albuquerque	Captain-majors of Portuguese Ceylon; 1578-1583	Succeeded by João de Correia de Brito
