= List of captain-majors of Portuguese Ceylon =

The Portuguese arrived in the Kingdom of Kotte in 1505. By 1551, they had appointed a captain-major to control the Portuguese occupied territory called Ceylon on the island of modern-day Sri Lanka. In that time, there were numerous captain-majors until 1594. The post of captain-major was preceded by that of the captain in 1518. In 1594, the captain-major was replaced with a governor.

== List of captain-majors ==
Portrait	Name	Birth	Death	Captain-major from	Captain-major until	Sovereign
	João Henriques	-	-	1551	1552	John III
	Diogo de Melo Coutinho (1st time)	-	-	1552	1552	John III
	Duarte de Eça	1480	15??	1552	1553	John III
	Fernão Carvalho	-	-	1553	1555	John III
	Afonso Pereira de Lacerda	-	-	1555	1559	John III; Sebastian
	Jorge de Meneses Baroche	-	-	1559	1560	Sebastian
	Baltasar Guedes de Sousa	-	-	1560	1564	Sebastian
	Pedro de Ataíde Inferno	-	-	1564	1565	Sebastian
	Diogo de Melo	-	-	1565	1568	Sebastian
	Fernando de Monroy	-	-	1568	1570	Sebastian
	Diogo de Melo Coutinho (2nd time)	-	-	1570	1572	Sebastian
	António de Noronha	-	-	1572	1575	Sebastian
	Fernando de Albuquerque	-	-	1575	1578	Sebastian
	Manuel de Sousa Coutinho	1540	1591	1578	1583	Sebastian; Henry; Filipe I
	João de Correia de Brito	-	-	1583	1590	Filipe I
	Simão de Brito	-	-	1590	1591	Filipe I
	Pedro Homem Pereira	-	-	1591	1594	Filipe I

== See also ==
- List of monarchs of Sri Lanka
- List of captains of Portuguese Ceylon
- List of captain-generals of Portuguese Ceylon
- History of Sri Lanka
