= João de Correia de Brito =

Captain-major of Portuguese Ceylon

15th Captain-major of Portuguese Ceylon
- In office 1583–1590
- Monarch: Philip I of Portugal
- Preceded by: Manuel de Sousa Coutinho
- Succeeded by: Simão de Brito

João de Correia de Brito was the 15th Captain-major of Portuguese Ceylon. Brito was appointed in 1583 under Philip I of Portugal, he was Captain-major until 1590. He was succeeded by Simão de Brito.

Against overwhelming odds at the second siege of Colombo by Rajasinha I of Sitawaka in 1587, Brito successfully defended the last Portuguese garrison and king Dharmapala of Kotte stationed at Colombo fort. The garrison consisted of about 300 Portuguese soldiers and forces loyal to Dharmapala. In 1594 the Portuguese and Kotte forces went on to capture the Kingdom of Sitawaka after the Portuguese conquest of the Jaffna kingdom in 1591. in 1656 the Dutch captured Colombo.

Government offices
Preceded by Manuel de Sousa Coutinho	Captain-majors of Portuguese Ceylon; 1583-1590	Succeeded by Simão de Brito
