= Danture =

Coordinates: 7°17′N 80°32′E

- Town
- Interactive map of Danture
- Country: Sri Lanka
- Province: Central Province
- Elevation: 1,600 ft (500 m)
- Time zone: UTC+5:30 (Sri Lanka Standard Time)
- zip code: 20465

Danture, also known as Danthure, is a village in Sri Lanka. It is located within Central Province. It is located about 20 kilometers from Kandy, the former capital of the country.

Danture was the site of a major battle between the Portuguese and the Kandyans in 1594. The Kandyans were victorious in this battle, which is considered a turning point in the indigenous resistance to Portuguese expansion. Danture is also home to a number of religious and cultural attractions. These include the Danture Viharaya, a Buddhist monastery that is said to have been founded in the 3rd century BC, the Husi Maha Devi Temple, a Hindu temple dedicated to the goddess Parvati, and the Danture Raja Maha Viharaya, a Buddhist monastery that is said to have been founded by King Parakramabahu I in the 12th century.

The name "Danture" means "place of the tooth" in Sinhala. This is because the village is said to be the home of a sacred tooth relic of the Buddha.

The village is surrounded by hills and forests. There are a number of hiking trails in the area that offer views of the surrounding countryside. Danthure is a relatively small village, but it has a number of shops, restaurants, and guesthouses.

== See also ==
- List of towns in Central Province, Sri Lanka
- Campaign of Danture
