= Pedro Homem Pereira =

17th Captain-major of Portuguese Ceylon
- In office 1591–1594
- Monarch: Philip I of Portugal
- Preceded by: Simão de Brito
- Succeeded by: Office abolished Pedro Lopes de Sousa (as Governor of Portuguese Ceylon)

Pedro Homem Pereira (fl. 1591 – 1595) was the 17th and last Captain-major of Portuguese Ceylon. Pereira was appointed in 1591 under Philip I of Portugal, he was Captain-major until 1594. The office of Captain-major was abolished and he was succeeded by Pedro Lopes de Sousa as Governor of Portuguese Ceylon.

Government offices
Preceded by Simão de Brito	Captain-majors of Portuguese Ceylon; 1591-1594	Succeeded by Office abolished Pedro Lopes de Sousa (as Governor of Portuguese Ceylon)
