= Kingdom of Kandy =

Kingdom on the island of Sri Lanka from 1469 to 1815

Kingdom of Kandy මහනුවර රාජධානිය Mahanuwara Rajadanya
- 1469–1815
- Left: Flag of the Kandyan Kingdom; Right: Civil Standard of the Monarch

- Territorial extent of the Kingdom of Kandy (1689–1796) Dutch-controlled areas
- Capital: Kandy
- Common languages: Sinhalese (court language 1469–1815 and dynastic language 1469–1739); Tamil (court and dynastic language 1739–1815); Pali (for religious purposes)
- Religion: Theravada Buddhism (official), Hinduism
- Government: Monarchy
- King
  - 1469–1511: Senasammata Vikramabahu (first)
  - 1798–1815: Sri Vikrama Rajasinha (last)
- Historical era: Kandyan period
  - Foundation of Senkadagalapura: 1469
  - Conquest by Sitawaka: 1581
  - Ascension of Vimaladharmasuriya I: 1592
  - Kandyan Convention: 2–18 March 1815
- Currency: Angutu Massa; Tangama; Salli; Panama; Tuttu
Preceded by	Succeeded by
Kingdom of Sitawaka	British Ceylon

The Kingdom of Kandy (මහනුවර රාජධානිය) was the last Sinhalese monarchy on the island of Sri Lanka, located in the central and eastern portion of the island. It was founded in the late 15th century and endured until the early 19th century.

Kandy was the last independent kingdom of the Sinhalese monarchy, administrative system, traditional martial culture and Theravada Buddhism against European Colonial powers for over three centuries, specifically the Portuguese and Dutch, before eventually falling to the British through the Kandyan Convention on March 2, 1815 at the Magul Maduwa, ending over 2,300 years of independent native rule.

== Name ==
Over the years, the Kingdom of Kandy has been known by many names. These include:

- Kanda Uda Pas Rata
- Senkadagala Kingdom
- Kanda Udarata
- Mahanuwara Kingdom
- Sri Wardhanapura
- Sinhalé
- Thun Sinhalaya or Tri Sinhala
- Kande Nuwara
- Kingdom of Kandy

== Geography and climate ==
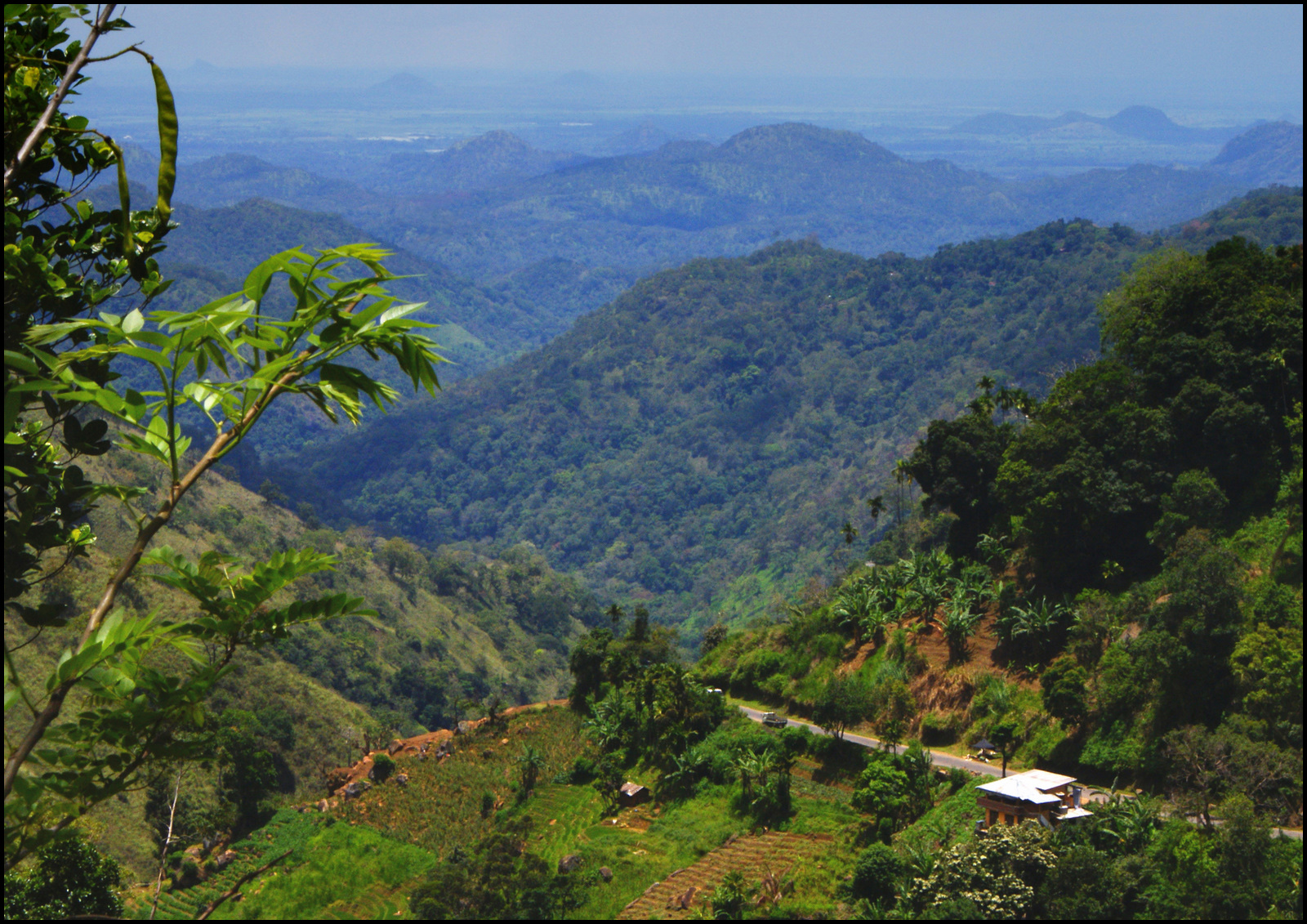
The Ella Gap – typical of the mountainous and densely forested terrain of the Kingdom of Kandy

Much of the Kandy Kingdom's territory was in Sri Lanka's mountainous and thickly forested interior, with mountain passes to the capital providing plenty of opportunities for defenders to stage ambushes. Routes to the city were kept secret, and spreading information concerning them could often result in death. Many routes into the hill country became impassable during the annual monsoon, and malaria was rife. Throughout its existence Kandyan forces used the land to their advantage, engaging in guerrilla warfare against invading forces, and evacuating major urban centres when enemy forces drew near – a tactic used with particular effect during the Kandyan Wars. Though the kingdom had intermittent access to the port of Batticaloa it had no naval forces and could not prevent the Portuguese and Dutch from maintaining a strong presence in lowland areas.

== Background ==
The city of Senkadagalapura (Kandy) may have been founded as early as the mid-14th century during the reign of Vikramabahu III (1357–1374). Central Sri Lanka was ruled by the kings of Kotte from the early 15th to late 16th centuries; with Kotte's weakening in the face of Portuguese influence the area developed into an autonomous domain with Senkadagalapura at its capital. Following the Vijayabā Kollaya in 1521, and the subsequent partition of the kingdom of Kotte, Kandy asserted its independence and emerged as a serious rival to the eastern and southern kingdoms.

== History ==
=== Rise (1521–1582) ===
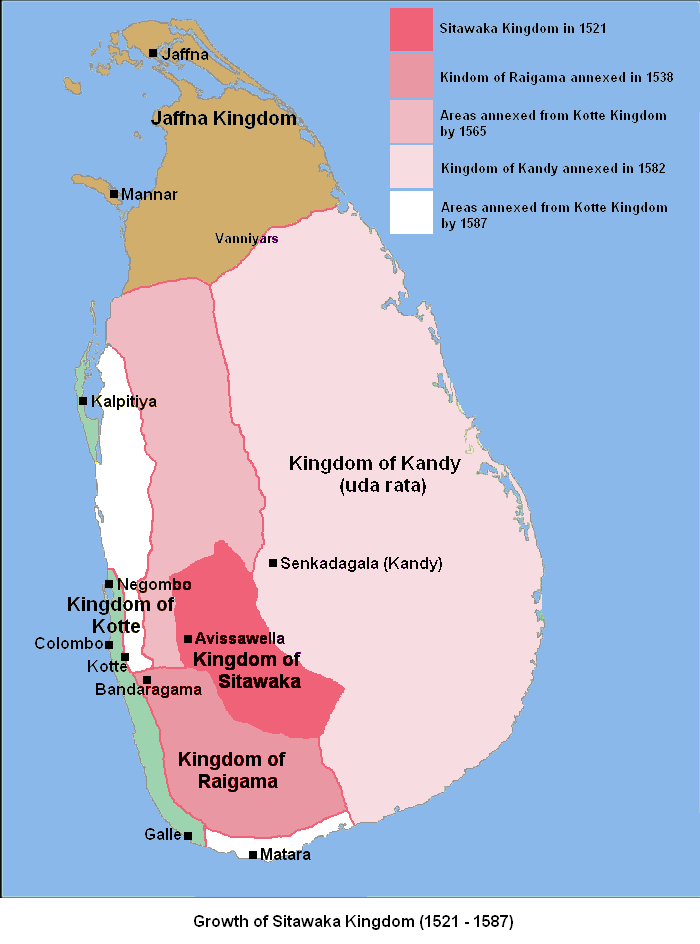
The growth and impact of the kingdom of Sitawaka, 1521–1594

Following the Spoiling of Vijayabahu in 1521, the kingdom of Kotte split into three competing states – Sitawaka, Raigama, and Bhuvanekabahu VII's kingdom of Kotte. Of these Sitawaka, under the dynamic leadership of Mayadunne, posed the greatest threat to the autonomy of the other states. In 1522, the Kandyans secured Portuguese protection against Sitawaka, but any potential for alliance ended in 1546 when Portuguese and Kotte forces invaded the kingdom. Kandy subsequently lent aid to the Jaffna Kingdom against the Portuguese in 1560.

=== Under Sitawaka occupation (1582–1592) ===
The Kingdom of Kandy was invaded twice during the 1570s and 1580s—first in 1574 and again in 1581—by Rajasinghe I of Sitawaka, who had recently ascended the throne. Rajasinghe, already renowned for his decisive victory over the Portuguese at the Battle of Mulleriyawa, succeeded in annexing Kandy outright. The Kandyan king, Karalliyadde Kumara Bandara (also known as Jayavira III), fled north to the Jaffna Kingdom with his daughter, Kusumasana Devi (later known as Dona Catherina of Kandy), and her husband, Yamasinghe Bandara. Both eventually converted to Christianity under Portuguese influence, adopting the names Dona Catherina and Don Philipe respectively. Meanwhile, the Portuguese also pressed their claim to Kandy, citing Dharmapala's donation of 1580 as a precedent

Sitawakan rule over Kandy proved difficult to maintain. Rajasinghe's appointed viceroy, Wirasundara Mudiyanse, rebelled soon after the initial conquest, though his uprising was swiftly suppressed. Another revolt broke out in 1588. Resistance eventually crystallized around Konnappu Bandara, Wirasundara's son, who had fled to Portuguese territory following his father's murder at the hands of Rajasinghe's agents. Between 1591 and 1594, Konnappu Bandara returned, seized the Kandyan throne under the name Wimaladharmasuriya I, and married Dona Catherina. His victories over both the Sitawakans and the Portuguese—who briefly occupied Kandy in 1592—secured his authority.

The strategic situation in Sri Lanka changed dramatically during Wimaladharmasuriya's rise to power. To the north, the Portuguese deposed the king Puviraja Pandaram of the Jaffna Kingdom in 1591 and installed his son Ethirimana Cinkam as client king. In 1594, Rajasinghe I died and the kingdom of Sitawaka disintegrated. Kandy remained the sole native polity outside of European dominance. In 1595, Wimaladharmasuriya brought the sacred Tooth Relic – the traditional symbol of royal and religious authority amongst the Sinhalese to Kandy, and Kandy entered a long period of attritionary warfare with the Portuguese, starting with the Campaign of Danture.

=== Consolidation (1592–1739) ===
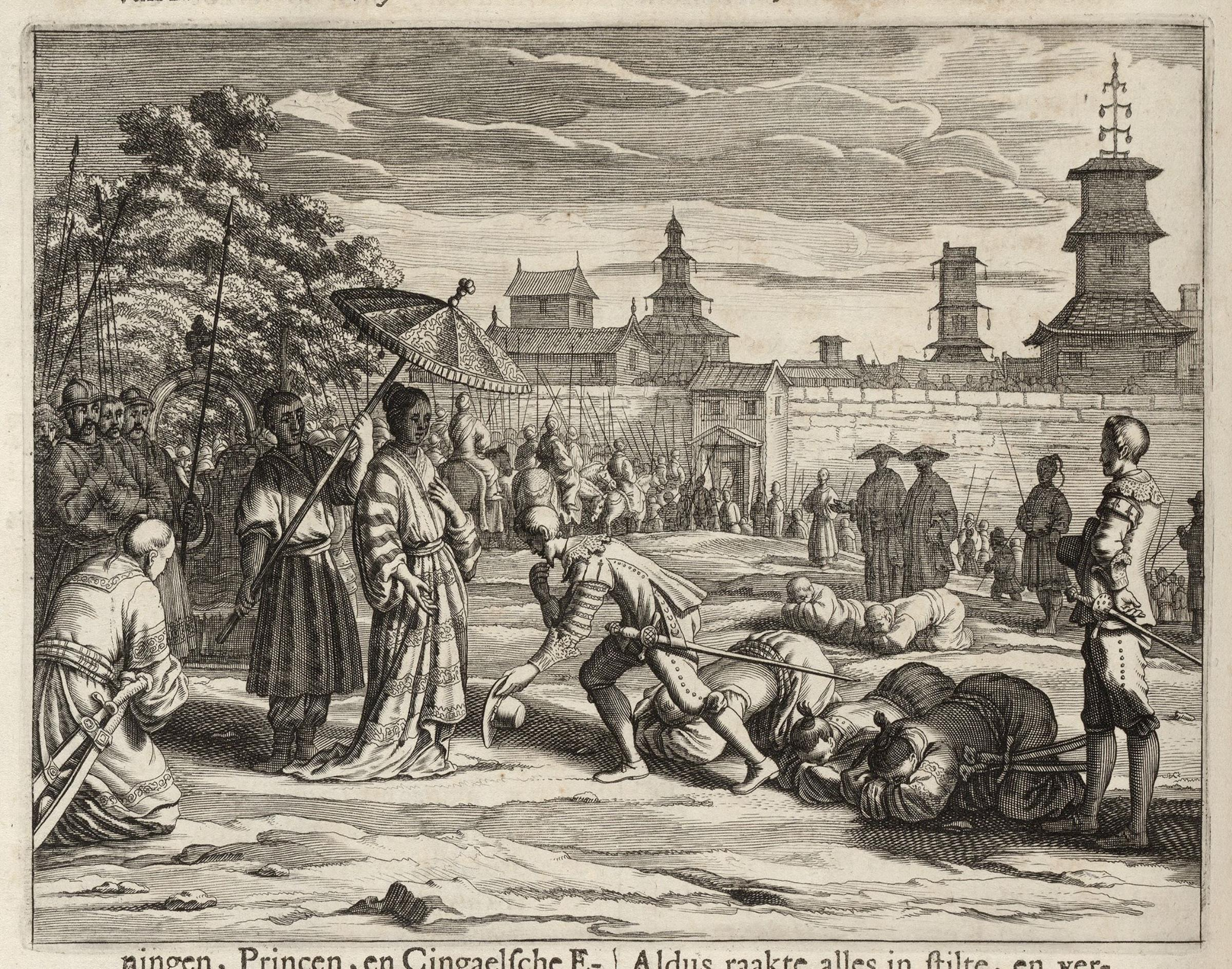
Portuguese governor Pedro Lopes de Sousa welcomes Kusumasana Devi a.k.a. Dona Catharina during the campaign of Danture, 1594

Hostilities between the Portuguese and the Kandyans continued throughout the rest of Wimaladharmasuriya's reign. The Kandyans lent aid to a rebellion led by Domingos Corrêa and later Simão Corrêa, Sinhalese subjects of Dharmapala, between 1594 and 1596. A Portuguese incursion in 1604 saw them capture Balane, but dissent amongst their Lascarin troops forced a withdrawal back to the coast.

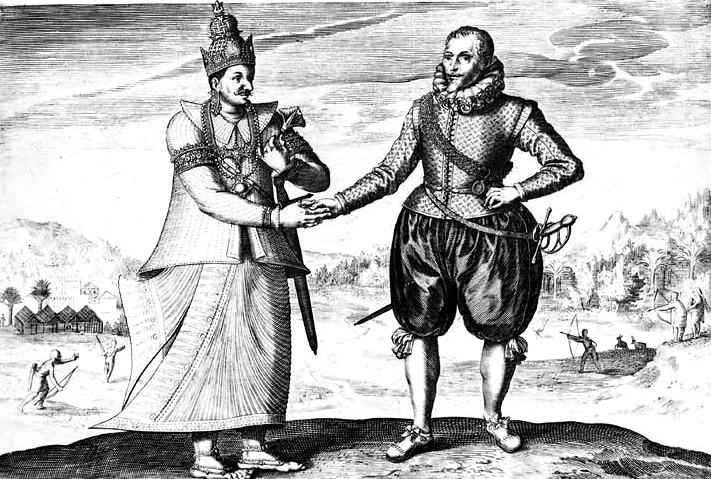
King Wimaladharmasuriya I receiving Joris van Spilbergen, 1603

Relations between the Dutch Republic and the Kandyans were initiated on 2 June 1602 when Dutch explorer Joris van Spilbergen arrived at Santhamuruthu on the eastern coast of Sri Lanka. Later that year the Dutch East India Company despatched Sebald de Weert to Kandy in an attempt to negotiate a treaty. The visit ended in disaster when the visitors offended their Kandyan hosts with their behaviour and in the ensuing fracas, de Weert and several of his entourage were killed.

Vimaladharmasuriya I died in 1604, and the throne passed to his cousin, Senarat. At the time of the king's death, Senarat was an ordained Buddhist monk, but he disrobed, married Dona Catherina, and assumed the kingship. Kuruvita Rala, the Prince of Uva of the Karava lineage, launched raids against the Kandyan Kingdom and temporarily forced Senarat out of his capital. In 1611, Portuguese forces, acting in the name of the pretender Mayadunne of Uva, captured Kandy and once again set the city ablaze. Further north, in 1619, Cankili II was deposed and the Jaffna Kingdom absorbed into the Portuguese Empire. Despite these setbacks, Senarat survived as the king and in 1612 had even concluded a treaty with the Dutch East India Company (VOC). When help came, it was in the form of Danish East India Company whose fleet arrived in 1620, but failed to secure Trincomalee and was expelled by the Portuguese.

The Portuguese strengthened their position throughout the 1620s, building forts at Kalutara, Trincomalee, Batticaloa, and in Sabaragamuwa, and upgrading fortifications in Colombo, Galle, and Manikkadawara. A disastrous defeat at the Battle of Randeniwela on 2 August 1630 in which Portuguese captain-general Constantino de Sá de Noronha was killed resulted in large parts of Portuguese Ceilao being overrun by the Kandyans. Internal instability yet again prevented the Kandyans from securing their acquisitions, and by the time of Senarat's death in 1635 lowland Sri Lanka was once again under Portuguese control.

The throne now passed to Senarat's son Rajasinha II, who led the Kandyans to a major victory over the Portuguese at Gannoruwa on 28 March 1638. The battle was to be the last major military victory for the kingdom of Kandy and succeeded in severely weakening the Portuguese presence in Sri Lanka. In May of that year he concluded a wide-ranging alliance with the Dutch, who were by now in control of Batavia. Batticaloa and Trincomalee fell in 1639, Galle in 1640, and Kandyan forces seized Portuguese territories further inland.

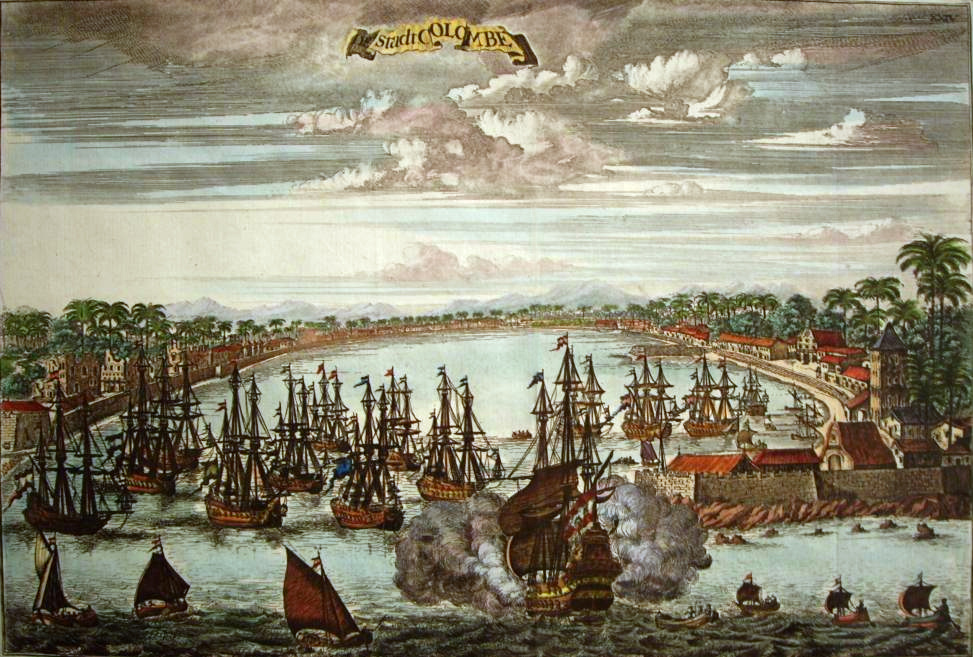
Dutch Colombo, based on an engraving of c. 1690

Relations between the Dutch and the Kandyans had been difficult from the onset and the alliance fell apart in the 1640s. The two sides joined forces again in the 1650s to expel the Portuguese, but a final break occurred in 1656 in the aftermath of the fall of Colombo after a six-month siege and the final expulsion of the Portuguese from Sri Lanka. Rajasinha demanded that the fort be handed over to the Kandyans for demolition; in November, the Dutch refused and drove the king and his army from the vicinity. Rajasinha's hold over his own population was tenuous, and rebellions against him in 1664 and 1671 gave the Dutch the opportunity to seize large parts of Sabaragamuwa in 1665, as well as Kalpitiya, Kottiyar, Batticaloa and Trincomalee. The seizure of the ports was a serious blow to the Kandyan kingdom – not only were Dutch holdings now more or less coterminous with the territory the Portuguese had held, but all Kandyan trade was now in Dutch hands. Rajasinha attempted to negotiate an alliance with France, who seized Trincomalee but were expelled by the Dutch in 1672. Kandyan campaigns in 1675 and 1684 recaptured some territory, but by the time of Rajasinha's death in 1687 neither city had returned to Kandyan control.

Rajasinha's son ascended to the throne as Vimaladharmasuriya II, and his twenty-year reign (1687–1707) proved relatively peaceable. A trade war broke out in 1701 when the Kandyans closed their borders with Dutch territories in order to stimulate trade through the ports of Puttalam and Kottiyar. As a result, the Dutch lost control of the areca nut trade and retaliated; by 1707 Kandyan borders had reopened and both ports were closed. Upon his death Vimaladharmasuriya II was succeeded by his son, who ruled as Vira Narendra Sinha. Several anti-Dutch uprisings occurred in the lowlands during the course of the 1720s and 1730s; the Kandyans in turn declared war on the Dutch in 1736 and seized some territory. Hostilities subsided with the appointment of Gustaaf Willem van Imhoff as Governor, and by 1737 the Dutch and Kandyans were once again at peace.

=== Internal strife under the Nayaks (1739–1815) ===
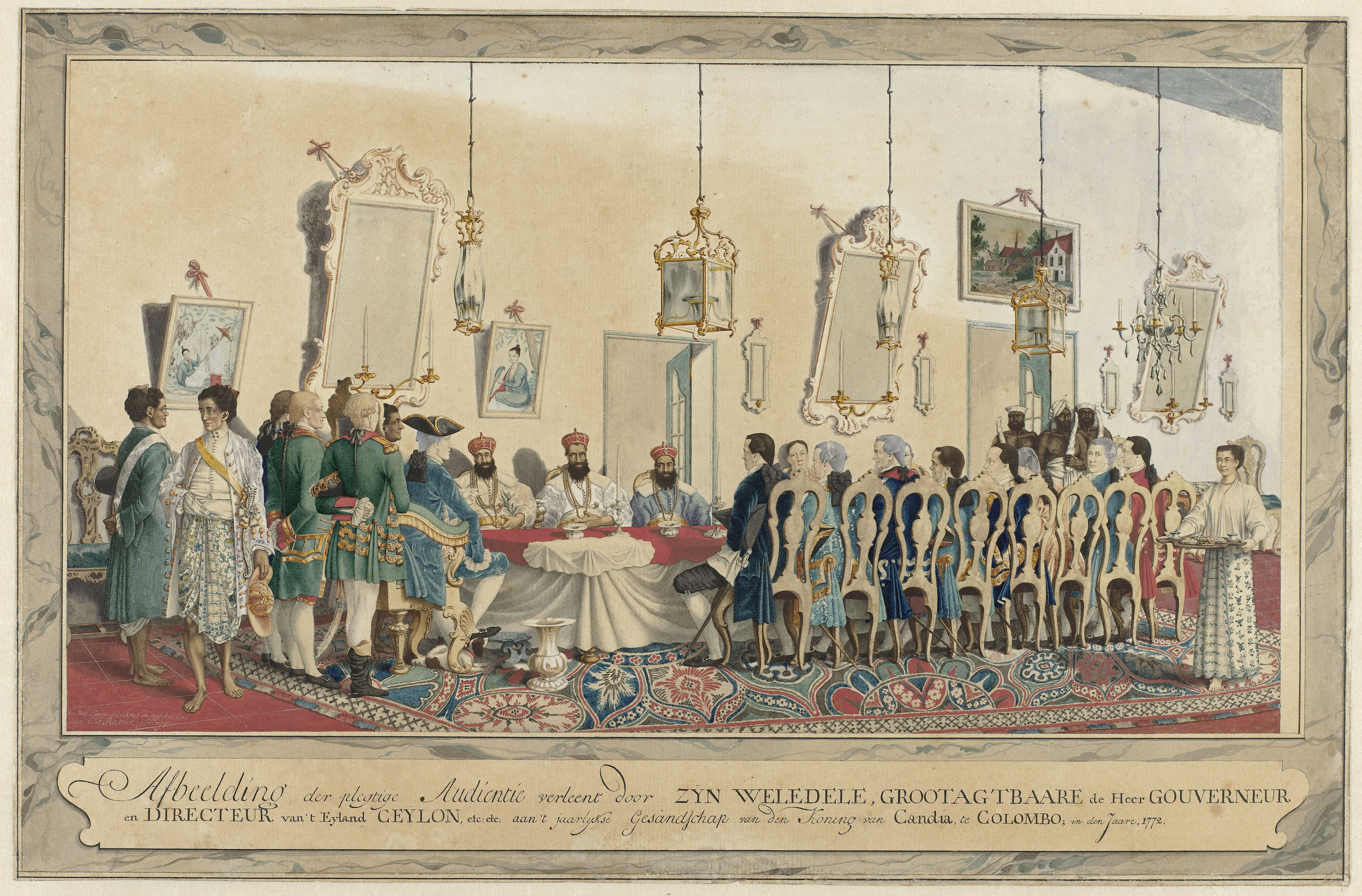
Reception of the envoys of the King of Kandy by the Dutch Governor Iman Falck, c. 1772

A succession crisis emerged upon Vira Narendra Sinha's death in 1739. The king had one son – Unambuve Bandara – by a Sinhalese consort. However, succession to the Kandyan throne was reserved exclusively for those of kshatriya ancestry on both their mother and father's side, and Unambuve's mother had been of a lower caste. With the support of the bhikku Weliwita Saranankara, the crown passed to the brother of one of Narendrasinha's senior wives, a member of the Tamil-speaking Nayak house from southern India. He was crowned Sri Vijaya Rajasinha later that year. The Nayak kings were of Telugu origin who practised Shaivite Hinduism and were patrons of Theravada Buddhism. The Nayak rulers played a huge role in reviving Buddhism in the island. They spoke Tamil, which was also used as the court language in Kandy alongside Sinhala.

Relations between the Sinhalese populace, including the Kandyan aristocracy, and the Nayakkars remained fraught throughout the 18th and early 19th centuries. As early as Narendrasinha's reign, attempts at appointing Nayakkars to prominent positions in court had caused rebellion, including one in 1732 that the king had only been able to crush with Dutch assistance. The Nayakkar nobility – which tended to be exclusivist and monopolise access to the king – was seen as forming an elite group privileged above the native aristocracy, the powerful adigars. Though Sri Vijaya Rajasinha's reign (1739–1747) proved relatively peaceful, his successor Kirti Sri Rajasinha had to deal with two major rebellions. The first, in 1749, was directed at his father Narenappa; the second, in 1760, was a far more dangerous insurrection which attempted to replace him with a Siamese prince. Despite these tensions, however, the Nayakkar dynasty endured, establishing support by their patronage of Buddhism and Kandyan culture.

Throughout the reigns of Sri Vijaya Rajasinha and Kirti Sri Rajasinha the Kandyans launched numerous raids and incursions into Dutch territory, including the annexation of villages in 1741, 1743, and 1745. The Dutch governors, subservient to Batavia, were under strict orders to avoid conflict with the kingdom, without ceding any of their privileges, including the monopoly of the cinnamon trade. In 1761, however, Kirti Sri Rajasinha launched a major invasion of the low country, annexing Matara and Hanwella as well as numerous frontier districts. It was to prove to be a disaster; the Dutch re-captured Matara and Hanwella in 1762, seized Puttalam and Chilaw in 1763, and then drove inland in a two-pronged invasion. The Kandyans evacuated Senkadagala, which the Dutch torched; outlying agricultural lands were also ravaged, leaving the kingdom on the brink of starvation by 1764. Kirti Sri Rajasinha requested assistance from the British in 1762 but failed to secure an alliance. By 1765 the Dutch were in a position to force a treaty upon the Kandyans returning not only the border districts but all of Kandy's coastal provinces to the Dutch; henceforth, the kingdom would be effectively cut off from the outside world. Relations between the Dutch and the Kandyans remained peaceable after this until the final expulsion of the former from the island in 1796.

Though several British sailors and priests had landed in Sri Lanka as early as the 1590s, the most famous was Robert Knox who published An Historical Relation of the Island Ceylon based on his experiences during the reign of Rajasinghe II in 1681. One hundred years later, British involvement in Sri Lankan affairs commenced in earnest with the seizure of Trincomalee by Admiral Edward Hughes as part of general British-Dutch hostilities during the American War of Independence.

The tumult of the French Revolution had spread to the Netherlands by 1795, and Dutch Zeylan sided with the Batavian Republic during the ensuing conflict. The British rapidly annexed Dutch possessions in Sri Lanka, taking Trincomalee (which had been returned to the Dutch in 1794) between 28 and 31 August, Batticaloa on 18 September, and the entirety of Jaffna on 28 September. Migastenne Disawa, the Kandyan ambassador, negotiated a treaty in Madras securing the return of much of the eastern coast to the Kandyans in February 1796; by the 15 of that month, Colombo had fallen and Dutch rule on the island had come to an end.

Kirti Sri Rajasinha died in the midst of these events in January 1796, and was succeeded by his brother Sri Rajadhi Rajasinha.

The new king rejected the terms of Migastenne's treaty, depriving the kingdom of the opportunity to regain the lands it had lost a generation earlier. It proved to be a fateful decision; the British immediately set about organising their new acquisitions, establishing systems of government, education, and justice. With the appointment of Frederick North (1798–1805) as the first British governor of Ceylon, any hope of the Kandyans regaining their eastern territories essentially disappeared.

Sri Rajadhi Rajasinha died of illness on 26 July 1798 with no heir. The English East India Company and the Crown both had control over the island from 1798 until it became the British crown colony of Ceylon in 1802. Much of the king's reign had been dominated by the powerful First Minister, Pilima Talawe, who now moved to enthrone a young relative of the king, 18-year-old Konnasami as Sri Vikrama Rajasinha. Muttusami, brother-in-law of the late king, also pressed his claim to the Kandyan throne. Pilima Talawe swiftly suppressed this challenge, arresting Muttusami and his sisters. Though outwardly cooperative with the British, Pilima Talawe proved unable to control Sri Vikrama Rajasinha and secretly coveted the throne himself. Between 1799 and 1801, in a series of meetings with the British at Avissawella he requested their support in deposing the king. Complex negotiations followed, with proposals ranging from installing Pilima Talawe as viceroy in Kandy while moving the king to British territory, to more direct interventions—yet all such plans were ultimately rejected by both parties.

The territories still held by the Dutch on the island were formally ceded to the British under the Treaty of Amiens in 1802, though the English East India Company continued to exercise a monopoly over the colony's trade. British agents were placed in charge of the lucrative pearl fisheries, as well as monopolies on cotton plantations, salt, and tobacco. In just the first three years of British administration, the government earned £396,000 from the pearl fisheries alone, a revenue that helped offset declining cinnamon prices caused by large Dutch stockpiles in Amsterdam.

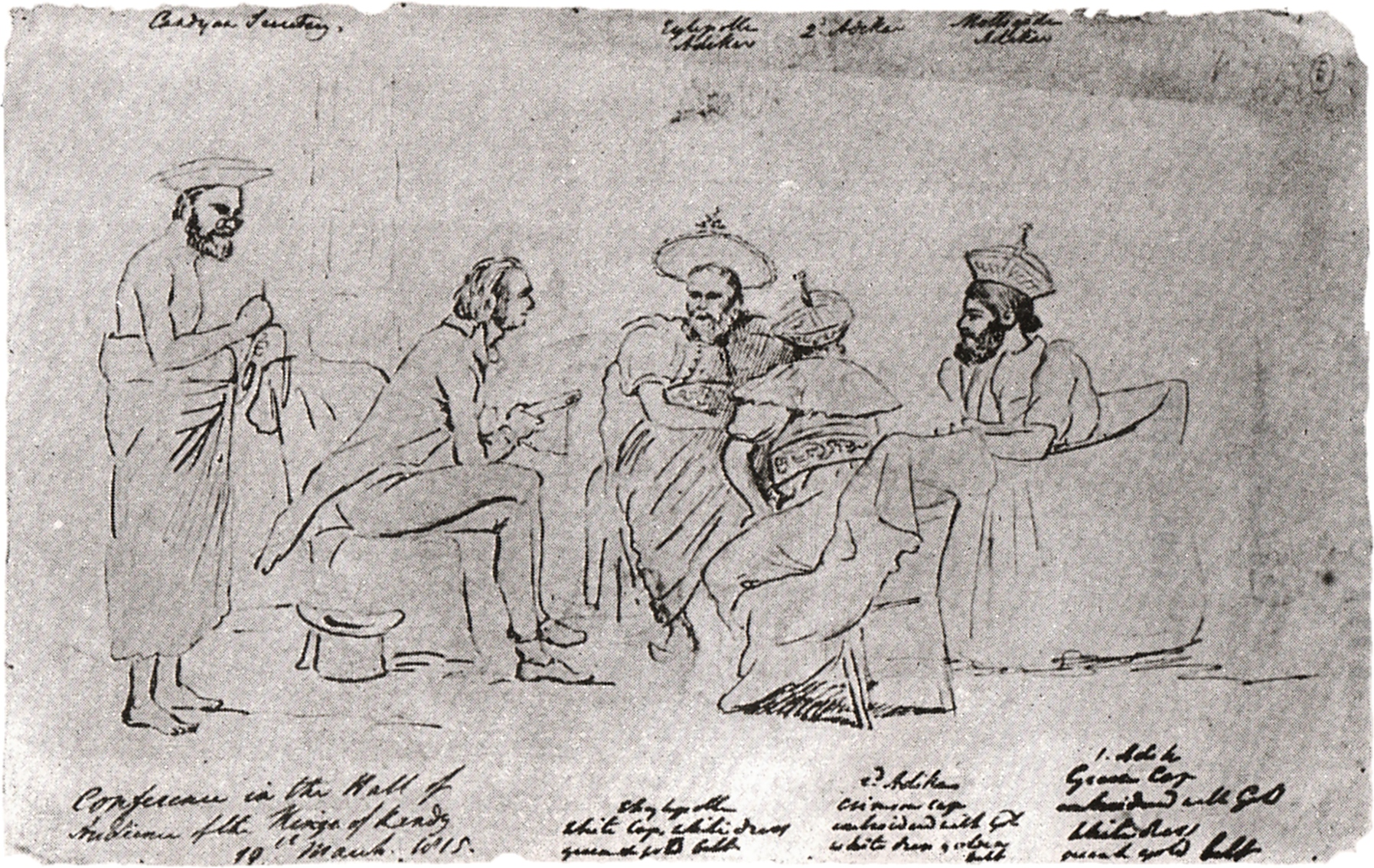
Kandyan chiefs Ehelepola, Molligoda and Kapuvatta with the British agent John D'Oyly.

Amidst rising tension, matters came to a head when a group of Moorish British subjects were detained and beaten by the agents of Pilima Talawe. British demands for reparations were ignored by the Kandyan court, prompting Governor North to order an invasion of Kandyan territory, thus beginning the First Kandyan War. On 31 January 1803, a British force led by General Hay Macdowall marched to Kandy and found it evacuated. The British installed Muttusami, but he was not respected by the Kandyans.

The occupation quickly unraveled. Surrounded by a hostile population, short of provisions, and ravaged by disease, the British position became untenable. When Macdowall fell ill, command passed to Major Davie. The British abandoned Kandy, leaving their sick behind—who were subsequently executed. As the retreating troops attempted to cross the Mahaweli River, they were decisively defeated by Kandyan forces. Muttusami, along with nearly all the captured British soldiers, was executed; only Davie and three others were spared.

The conflict dragged on for two years, becoming the longest and most intense phase of the Kandyan Wars, as Governor North persisted in sending fresh forces to the frontiers despite repeated setbacks.

The British fought their way to Kandy, encountering Kandyan resistance led in part by a Malay commander known as Sangunglo. Upon their arrival they found the city deserted. Rather than torching it, they installed a puppet king, Muttusami, and left a small garrison in the town before withdrawing. The Kandyans recaptured the city, leaving only one survivor, and harried British forces down to the Mahaveli river, but were routed at Hanwella. The following year another British incursion resulted in a stalemate, and an uneasy truce was in place by 1805.

In the following decade, Sri Wickrama Rajasinha's increasingly erratic and capricious rule led to serious unrest amongst the population. A major rebellion in the Seven Korales nearly dethroned him in 1808. The powerful Pilima Talawe rebelled in 1810, was captured, and executed. In 1814, the king ordered Ehelepola Adigar, Dissava of Sabaragamuwa, to Kandy. Ehelepola, suspecting a trap, refused; in revenge, the king had his wife and three children executed. Such was the cruelty of the execution that the Kandyan populace, not unused to sights of public execution, now turned en masse against the king. The king was also hugely unpopular amongst the clergy for his sudden and brutal seizures of temple lands.

In November 1814, ten British subjects were captured and mutilated in Kandyan territory. Governor Robert Brownrigg ordered several British forces moved inland from their coastal strongholds in January 1815, accompanied by native forces under Ehelepola. Molligoda, Ehelepola's successor in Sabaragamuwa and Dissava of the Four Korales, defected to the British in February; Kandy was seized on 14 February, and Sri Wickrama Rajasinghe himself captured on 18 February. The king was subsequently exiled to India, where he died in 1832. His son died childless in 1843, bringing the Nayakkar line to an end.

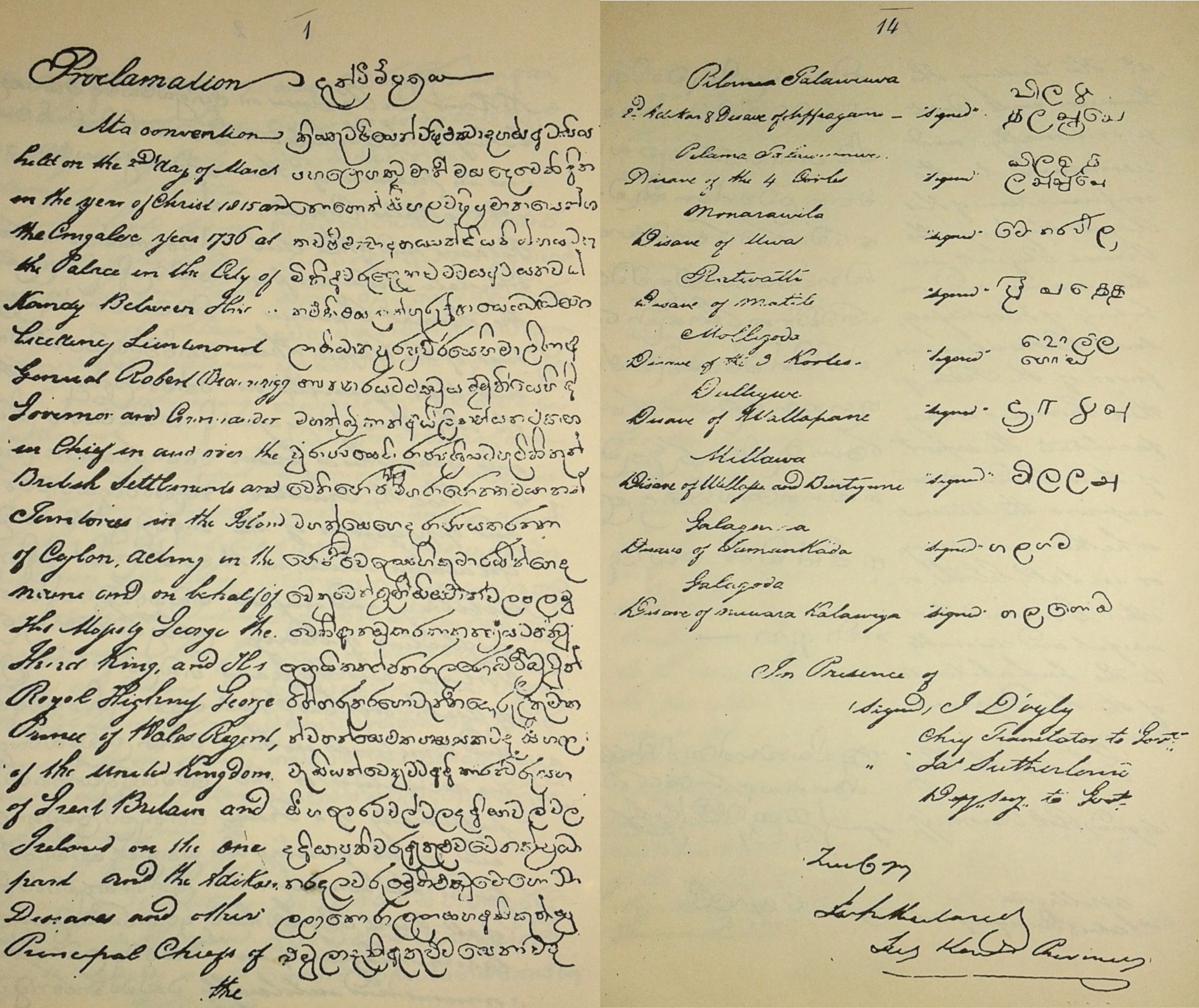
The Kandyan Convention document.

On 2 March 1815, British agents – including Robert Brownrigg and John D'Oyly – met with the nobility of the kingdom and concluded in a conference a treaty known as the Kandyan Convention. The provisions of the treaty allowed for the protection of Buddhism and the preservation of local systems of government under the authority of the British Governor in Colombo and supervised by British agents in Sabaragamuwa, the Three Korales, and Uva. In practice, however, local chiefs such as Ehelepola and Molligoda were acutely aware that they were ultimately answerable to the British, and were in practice junior to British colonial officials who now had free access to their domains.

=== Dismantling of institutions (Post 1817) ===
Rebellion broke out in 1817 in the Vellassa region, spreading rapidly to Uva and Valapane. Keppitipola, Dissave of Uva, was sent to quash the uprising, but defected and joined the rebels instead. By July, every major Kandyan chief except Molligoda had joined the rebellion; several, including Ehelepola, had already been captured. Brownrigg responded to the rebellion by ordering that all males between 15 and 60 years of age in Uva Province be driven out, exiled or killed. In addition, the irrigation systems in Uva and Wellassa were destroyed, "one hundred thousand" paddy fields in Wellassa were burnt, all property was appropriated, and cattle and other animals were slaughtered en masse. Brownrigg also issued a Sri Lanka Gazette Notification that condemned anyone who participated in the Great Uprising with property confiscation, extradition to Mauritius, and even execution. (This Gazette Notification labelling the rebels as "traitors" was only revoked two centuries later, in 2017, with 81 leaders of the freedom struggle being formally declared as National Heroes.) Molligoda, however, ensured the road to Kandy remained open and on 30 October Keppetipola was captured. His associate Madugalle Adikaram was captured on 1 November, and thereafter the rebellion collapsed. Both leaders were beheaded on 26 November 1817. Viewing the convention as null and void, the British set about breaking the power of the nobility. Though smaller uprisings occurred in 1820, 1823, and 1824, none of them seriously threatened the British government of the highlands.

The area of the central highlands in which the Kandyan kingdom was situated had the natural protection of rivers, waterways, hills and rocky mountainous terrain. The prominent location of the Kandyan kingdom with its cool climate had greatly contributed to protecting the independence of the nation for nearly three centuries.

== Royal Palace Complex ==
=== Sri Dalada Maligawa ===
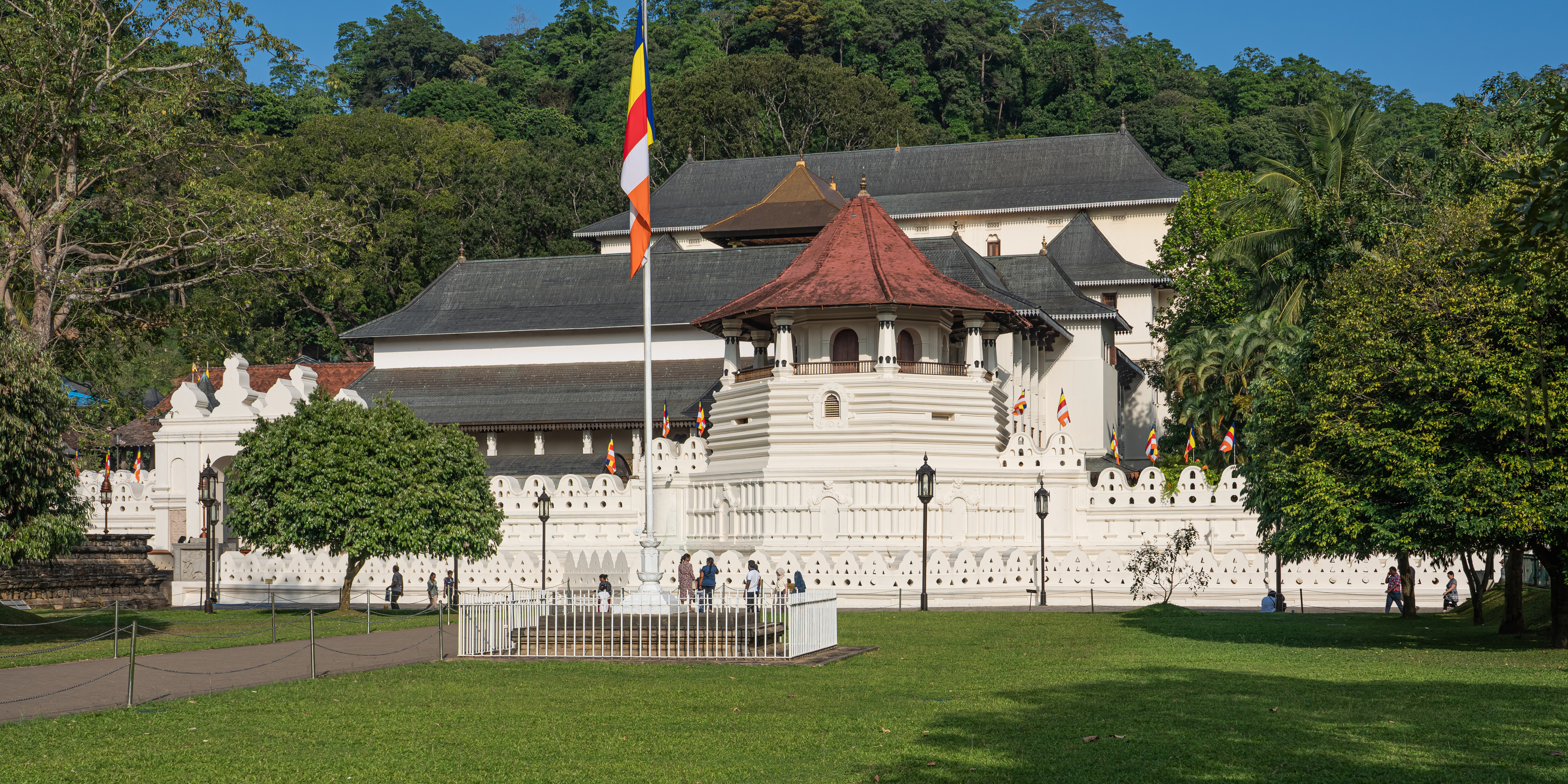
Temple of the Tooth is the focal point of Buddhism in Sri Lanka.

The Sri Dalada Maligawa is a Buddhist temple located within the Royal Palace Complex, which houses the relic of the tooth of the Buddha. Since ancient times, the relic has played an important role in national politics because it is believed that whoever possessed the relic held the right to governance of the country. Safeguarding the relic was the responsibility of the monarch from then, therefore over the years, the custodianship of the relic came to symbolize the right to rule the island. Therefore, reigning monarchs built the tooth relic temples (Sri Dalada Maligawa) quite close to their royal residences, as was the case during the times of the Anuradhapura, Polonnaruwa, and Dambadeniya Kingdoms. During the era of the Kingdom of Gampola, the relic was housed in Niyamgampaya Vihara. It is reported in the messenger poems such as Hamsa, Gira, and Selalihini that the temple of tooth relic was situated within the city of Sri Jayawardenepura Kotte when the Kingdom of Kotte was established there.

During the reign of Dharmapala of Kotte, the relic was moved and was hidden in Delgamuwa Vihara, Ratnapura, in a grinding stone. It was brought to Kandy by Hiripitiye Diyawadana Rala and Devanagala Rathnalankara Thera. Vimaladharmasuriya I built a two-storey building to hold the tooth relic however the building is now gone. In 1603 when the Portuguese kingdom invaded Kandy, it was carried to Meda Mahanuwara in Dumbara. It was recovered in the time of Rajasinha II and it has been reported that he reinstated the original building or built a new temple. The present-day temple of the tooth was built by Vira Narendra Sinha. The octagonal Paththirippuwa and moat were added during the reign of Sri Vikrama Rajasinha. The royal architect Devendra Moolacharya is credited with building the Paththirippuwa. Originally it was used by the king for recreational activities and later it was offered to the tooth relic, it now houses the temple's library.

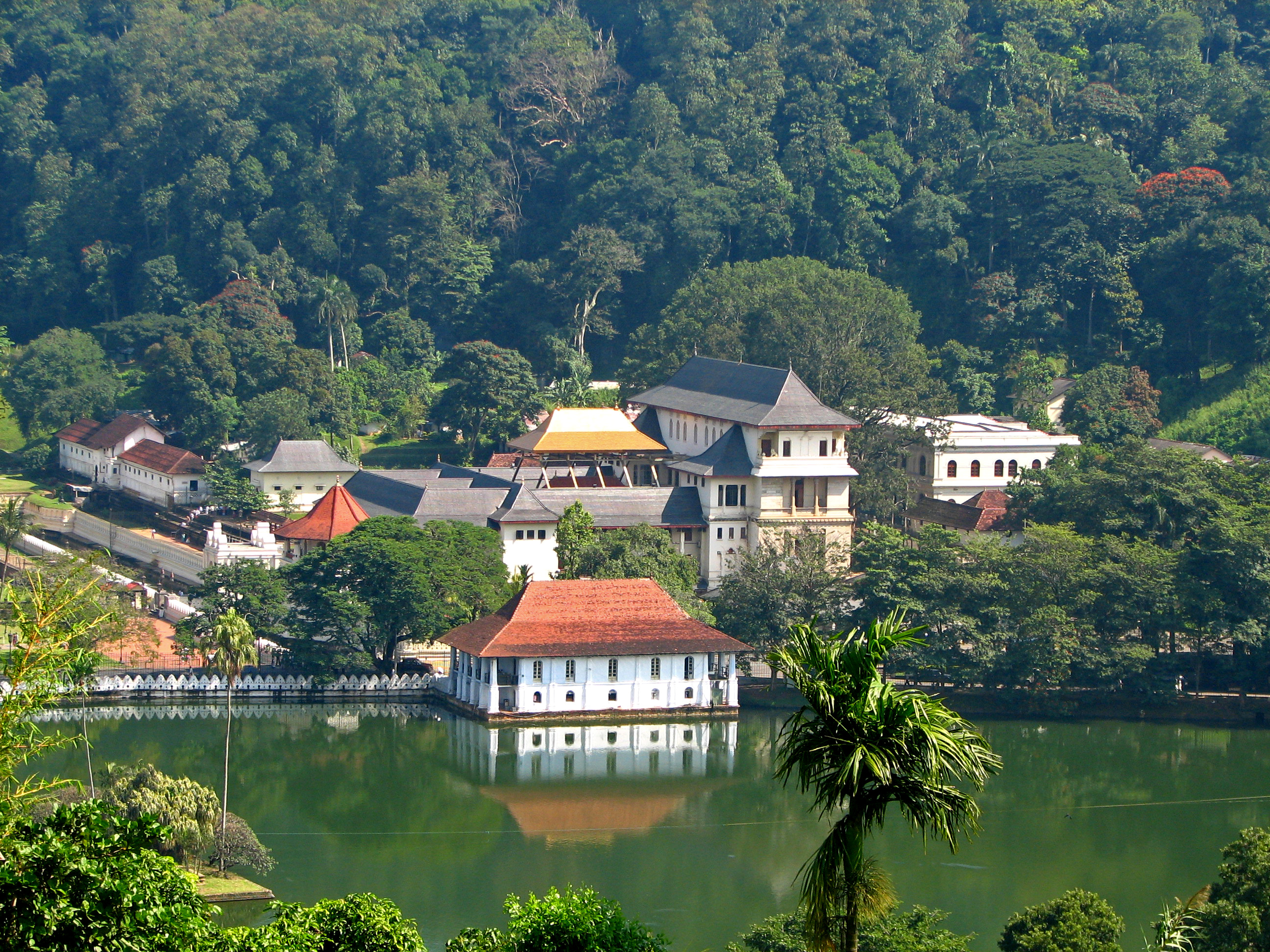

1	Temple of the Tooth building complex
2	Mahawahalkada (Main entrance)
3	Moat
4	Paththirippuwa (Octagon)
5	Handun Kudama
6	Golden Canopy
7	Temple of the Tooth Museum (New palace)

8	Royal Palace of Kandy
9	National Museum of Kandy
10	International Buddhist Museum (Old courts building)
11	Kandy Lake
12	Ulpange (Queens Bathing Pavilion)
13	Jayatilleke Mandapaya
14	Udawatta Kele Sanctuary

=== Royal Palace ===
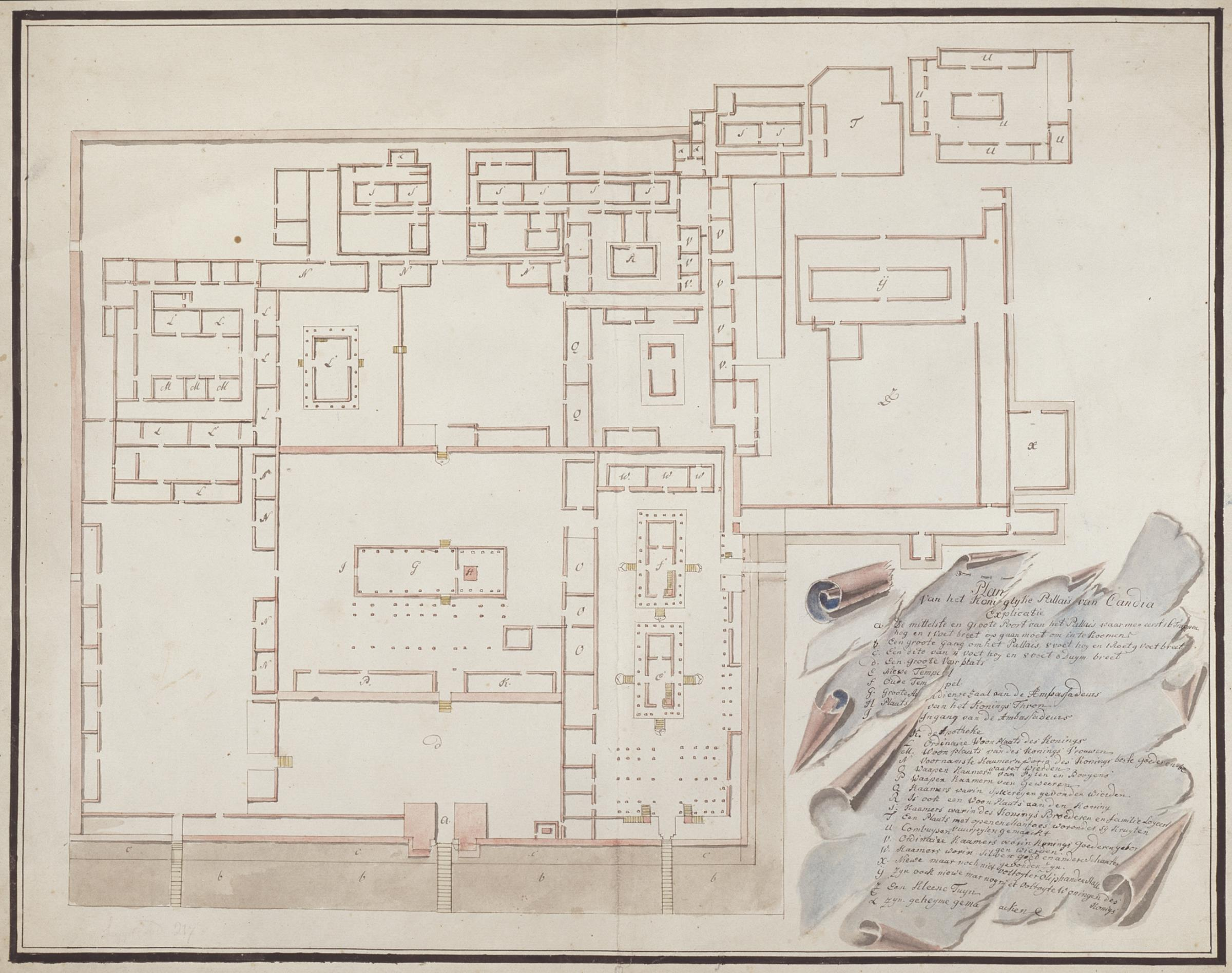
Plan of the Royal Palace of Kandy, 1765, drawn by the Dutch

The Maha Wasala or royal palace, known simply as the "Maligawa" (Palace), was the official residence of the Kandyan kings, situated to the north of the Sri Dalada Maligawa. The palace complex is a remarkable example of traditional Kandyan architecture, adorned with intricate wood and stone carvings, and murals on the walls. It comprises several buildings, including the Audience Hall, the Queen's Palace, the King's Palace, and the famous Temple of the Tooth Relic. The Temple of the Tooth, one of the most revered Buddhist temples in the world, is also located within the palace complex. The palace complex and the Temple of the Tooth are both designated as UNESCO World Heritage Sites.

The city of Kandy was built in a stunning pattern of twelve cycles by the kings of Kandy, showcasing their grandeur and architectural prowess. However, after the fall of the kingdom to British invaders, the once glorious landscape was altered beyond recognition. John Pybus, who was on an embassy in 1762, gives a detailed description of the royal palace. Vikramabahu III (r. 1356–1374) and Senasammata Vikramabahu (r. 1469–1511) built royal palaces on this site. Vimaladharmasuriya I undertook various decorations to the palace. The Dutch orientalist Philippus Baldaeus visited the palace with General Gerard Pietersz Hulft in 1656. The royal residence was known as "Maha Wasala" in Sinhalese starting in the Polonnaruwa period. There were three Wahalkadas and an 8 feet (2.4 m) high wall used as main entrances. The section of the palace facing the Natha Devale is said to be the oldest. During the beginning of the British period, it was used by the government agent Sir John D'Oyly, 1st Baronet, of Kandy. Successors of D'Oyly have continued to use it as their official residence. Today it is preserved as an archaeological museum. Ulpen Ge and Queens Palace are the associated buildings of the palace.

The Maha Maluwa or Great Terrace is the esplanade (approximately 0.4 ha (0.99 acres)) located in front of the Temple of the Tooth. The site was the threshing ground of a large paddy field, that is the Kandy Lake today. According to local folklore when King Vimaladharmasuriya wanted to select a site for his capital astrologers advised him to select the site of the threshing floor which was frequented by a Kiri Mugatiya (white mongoose).

The Magul Maduwa or Royal Audience hall, is where the Kandyan kings held their court, met his ministers and carried out his daily administrative tasks. The Magul Maduva was utilised as a place of public audience and figured as a centre of religious and national festivities connected with the Kandyan Court. The area was where the tooth relic (Dalada) was occasionally exhibited from public veneration and it was at the Maha Maluva that the King received the Ambassadors from other countries. The building was also known as the "Maha Naduwa" or Royal Court. The construction of this finely carved wooden building was commenced by Sri Rajadhi Rajasinha in 1783.

Originally the hall was 58 by 35.6 feet (17.7 m × 10.9 m); after renovation, its length was extended by an additional 31.6 feet (9.6 m). It was completed during the reign of Sri Vikrama Rajasinha. The carvings of the wooden pillars which support the wooden roof are an example of wood carving of the Kandyan period. Other nearby buildings to the halls are believed to have been demolished during the British rule. The audience hall was the venue where the Kandyan Convention was drawn up, it was where the convention was read out to the people and where the conference, about the convention, was held on 2 March 1815.

The Palle Vahale or Lower Palace, originated during the reign of Sri Vickrama Rajasingha. It served as the abode primarily designated for the king's esteemed royal concubines, affectionately referred to as Ridi dolis and Yakada dolis.

The Meda Wasala (Queens' Chambers) is situated to the north of the Palle Vahale, which once served as the dwelling for royal concubines and shares a similar architectural design. This edifice features a compact open courtyard, enveloped by verandahs and a solitary bedroom. Remarkably, it is constructed from prized timber, with a bed supported by four stone foundations. The entry to the central hall has substantial log beams, and the door is diminutive, tethered to the roof with wooden hinges. An intriguing facet is its design, intended for locking from the inside only. The corridor flanking the courtyard is adorned with frescoes, a distinctive attribute for a residential structure.

The Meda Wasala showcases many facets of Kandy era architecture, including intricately carved wooden pillars, piyassa embellished with pebbles, a central courtyard with a padma boradam (lotus pond), and a drainage system encircling it. Historical accounts from the Kandy era recount that Sri Vikrama Rajasingha secluded Queen Rangammal within this abode, granting only her most trusted attendants the privilege of seeing her. Despite its modest size, the Meda Wasala contains only one room. Notably, four copper sheets found in the archaeological museum are believed to have been employed as protective spells, concealed within pits within the four pillars of the bed. These mantras likely served to safeguard against indiscretions. Additionally, beneath the plaster on the wall's surface, floral patterns etched upon a red background have been discovered.

The Ulpange (Queen's Bathing Pavilion) is positioned south of the Temple of the Tooth. Dating back to 1806, the building was constructed under the patronage of Sri Vickrama Rajasinha, and designated as a haven for his queens, including Queen Venkatha Ranga Jammal (Rengammal) and her companions. This two-storey structure is surrounded by the lake on three sides. The upper level fulfilled the role of a dressing chamber, while the lower level was a haven for private bathing. Arches, bolstered by columns, facilitated solar access and light into the bathing areas.

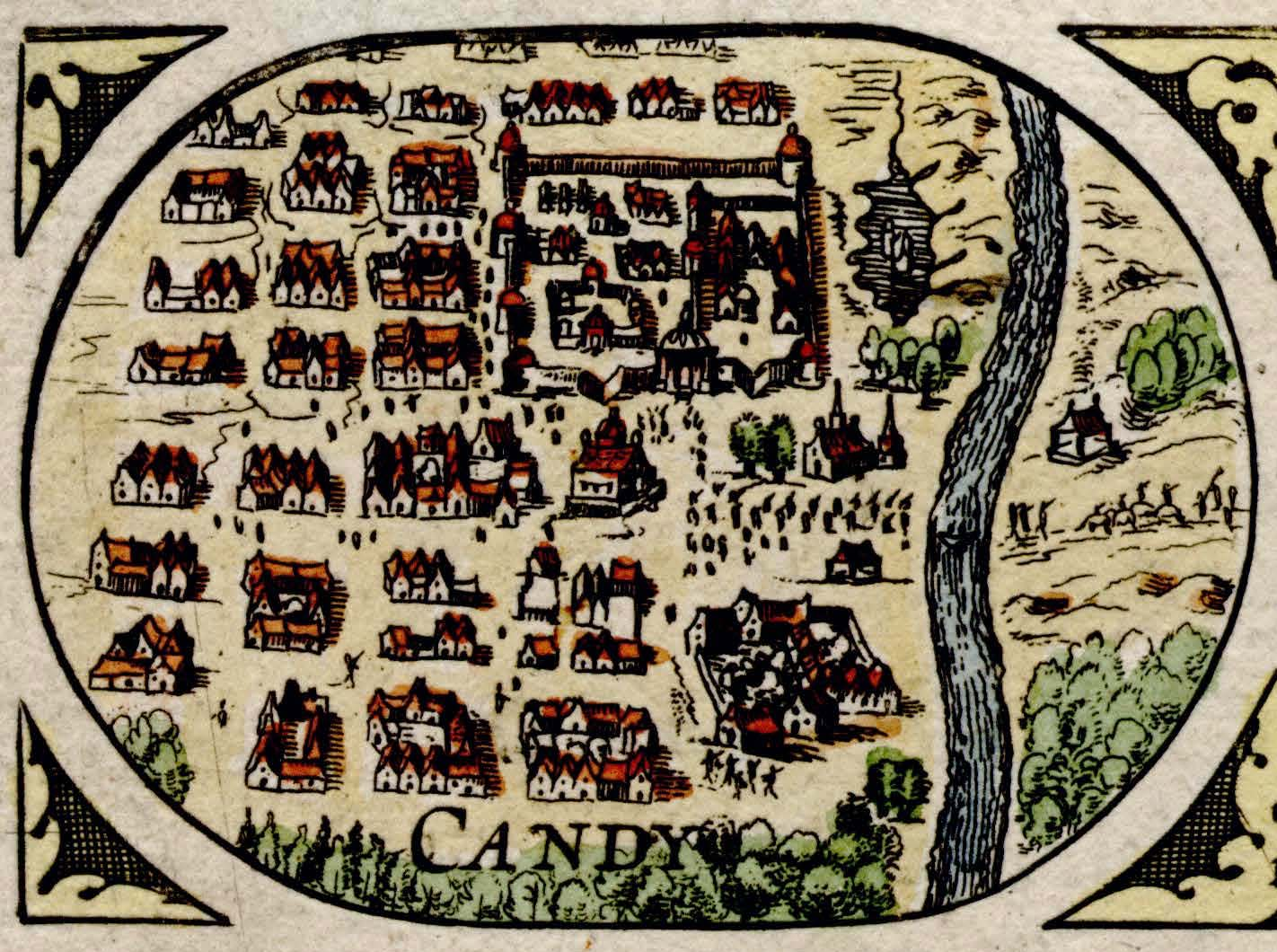
Map of Kandy during Wimaladharamasooriya I era with Royal Palace and surroundings, drawn by Portuguese envoys

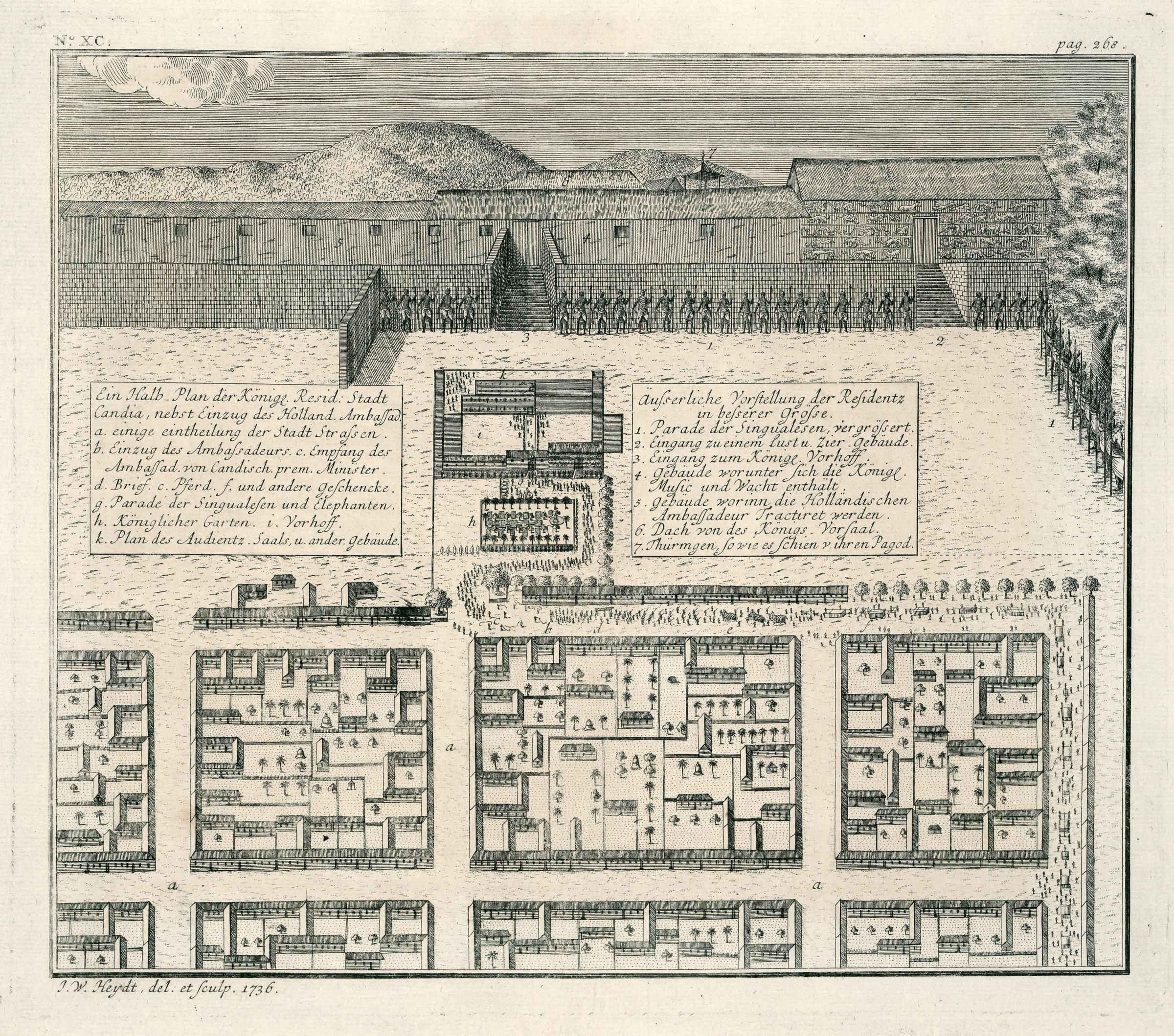
Kandy in 1736: A Historic Map Featuring the Royal Residence, by Johann Wolfgang Heydt

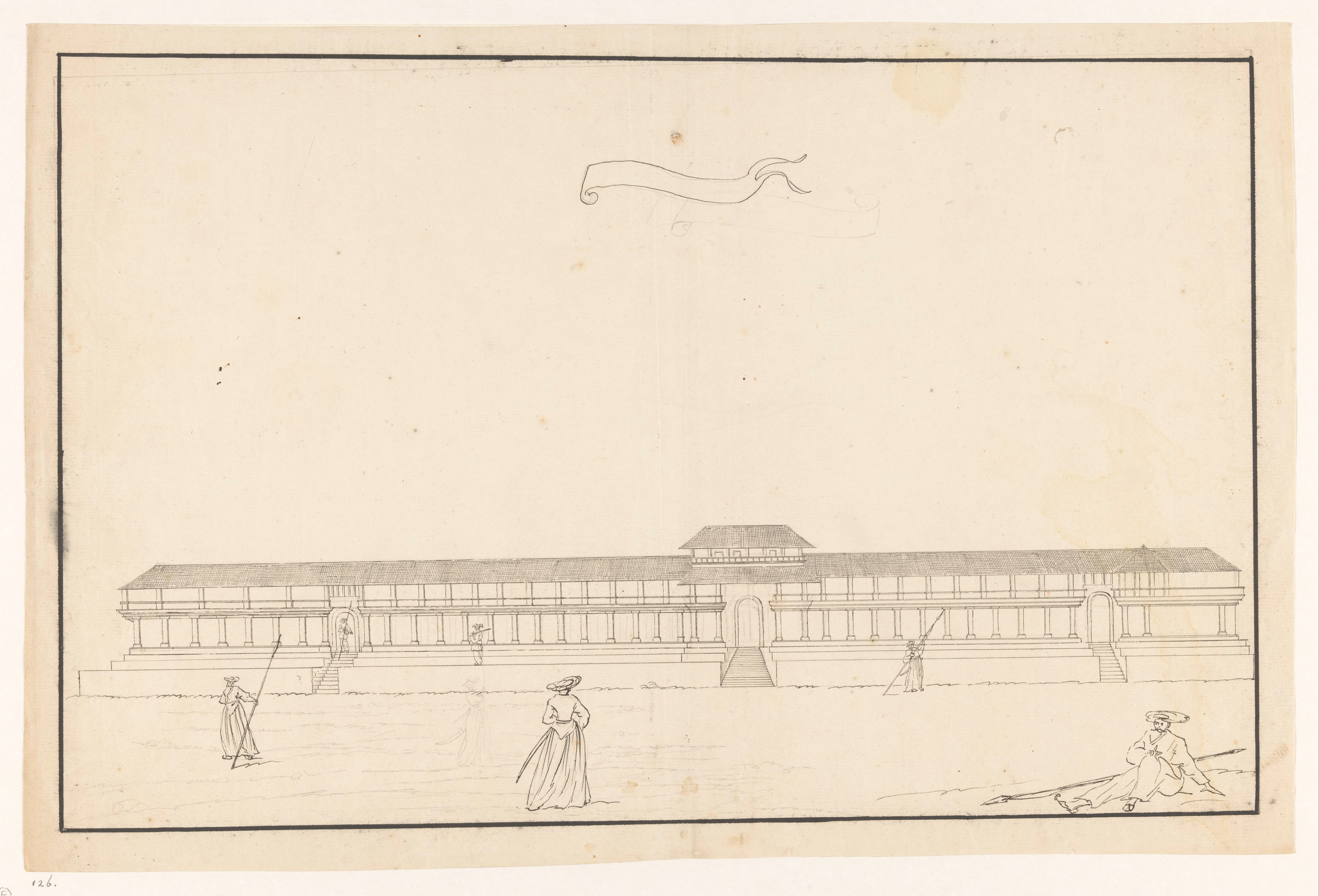
Front view of the Palace of the King of Kandy, drawing by Johannes Rach (School of), c. 1770

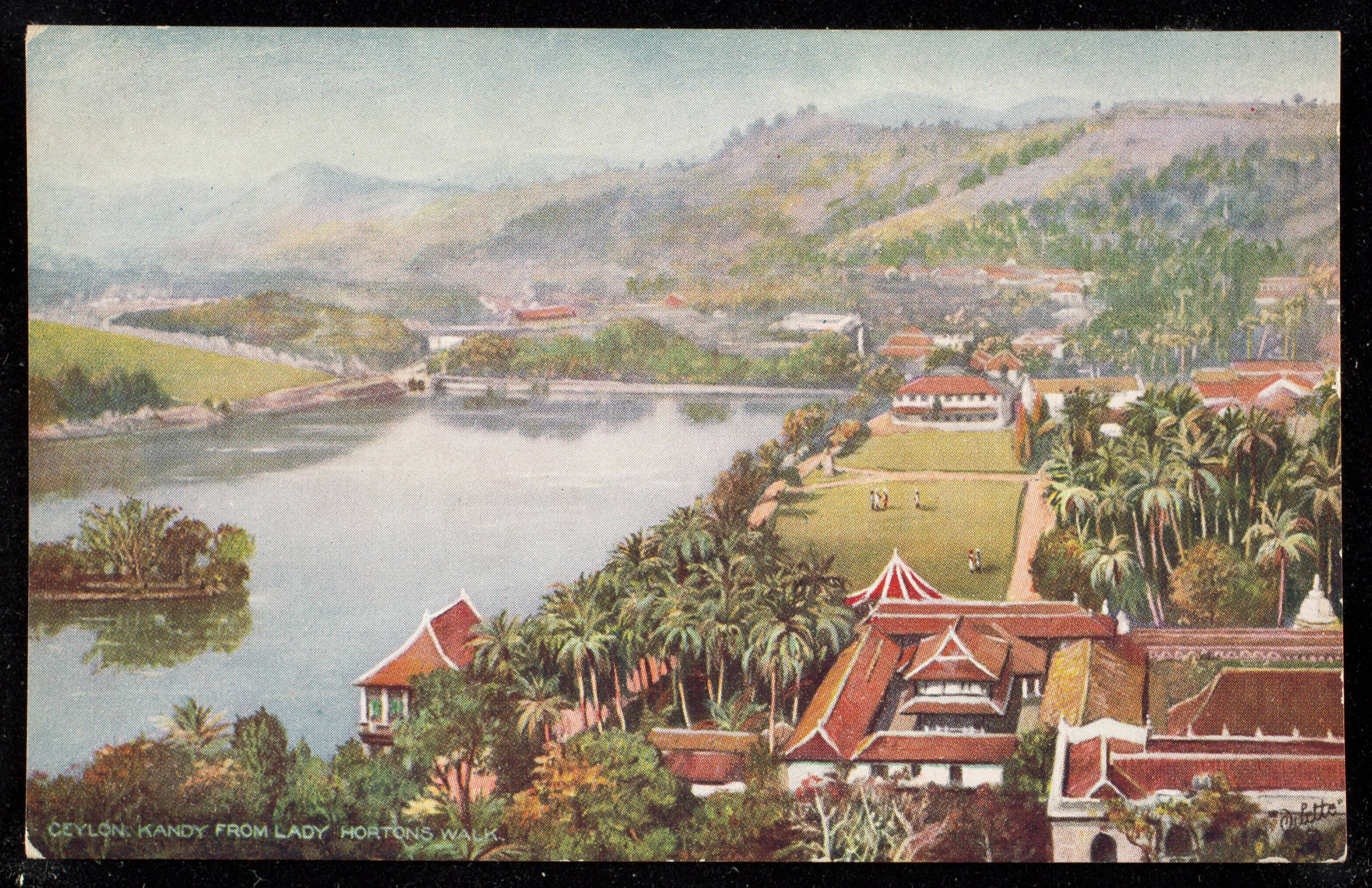
Palace Grounds of Kandy as seen from Lady Horton's Walk in 1870

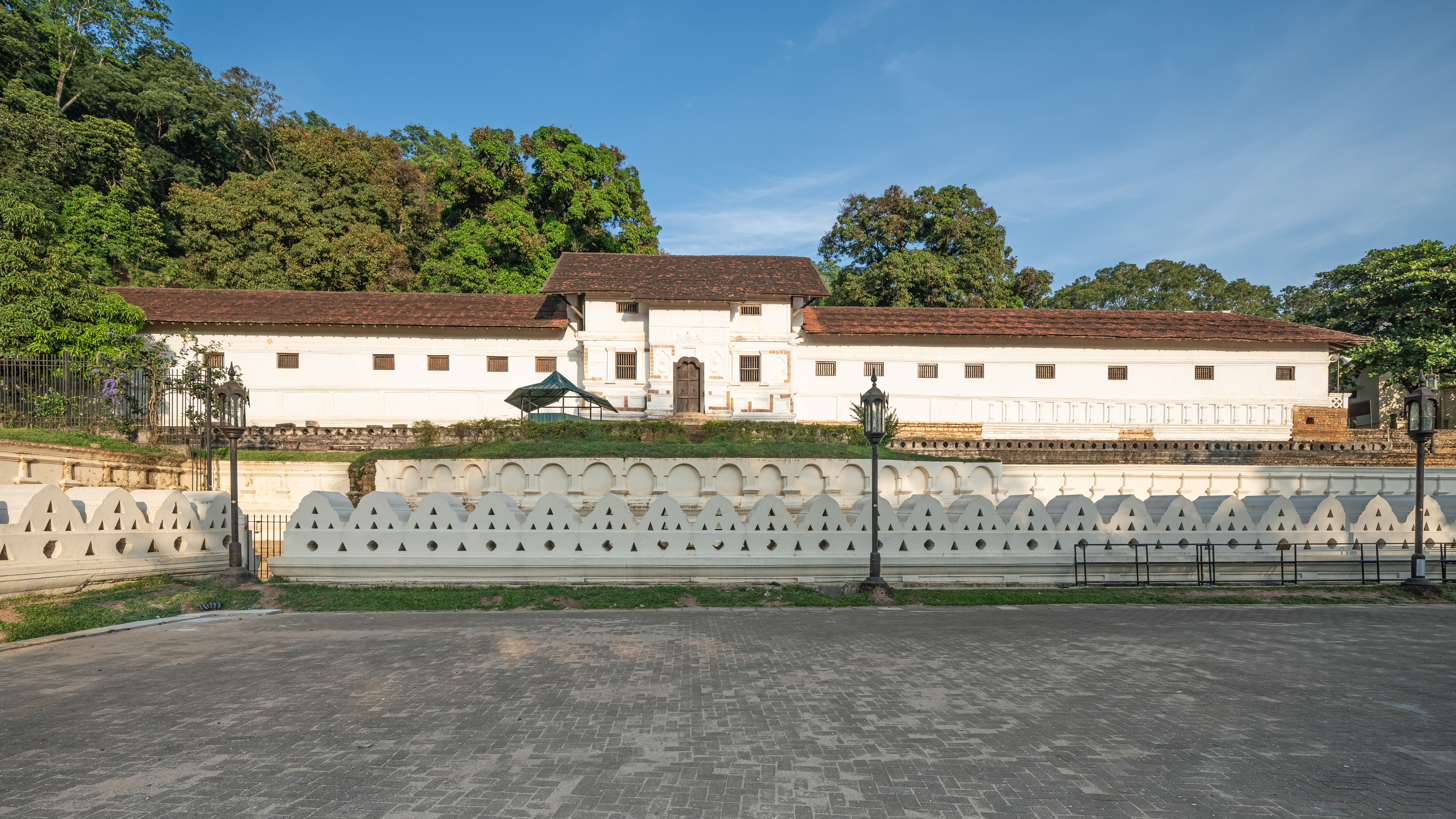
Vimaladharmasuriya I of Kandy built the Royal Palace of Kandy

== Government ==
=== The Monarch ===
According to the Kandyan administrative system, the king was head of all spheres. He was also known as "Lankeshwara Thrisinhaladheeshwara". It was accepted that the king owned all lands and therefore was known as "Bhupathi". Even though the king was called "Adeeshwara", it was customary to consult the principal chiefs and Buddhist priests. The king had to follow the customs and traditions which were in popular practice at that time, otherwise, the people would rebel against him if he did not. Not obeying these would be detrimental to the power of the king, an example being Vikrama Rajasinha, who had to surrender to the British, merely because he ignored the advice of the Buddhist priests and chieftains and did not follow the age old traditions. The king would have judicial authority in civil and criminal cases.

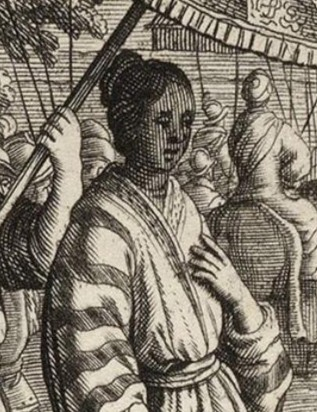
Kusumasana Devi, reigned 1582

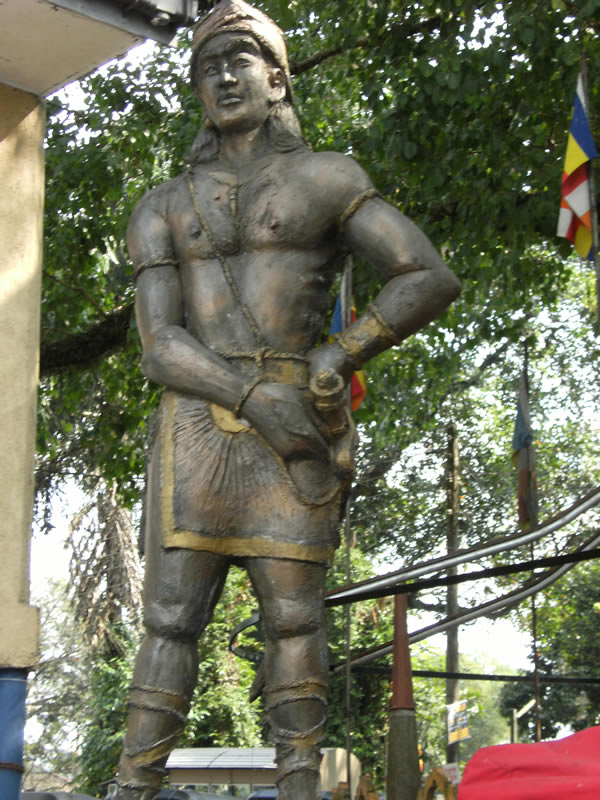
Rajasinha I, reigned 1581–1592

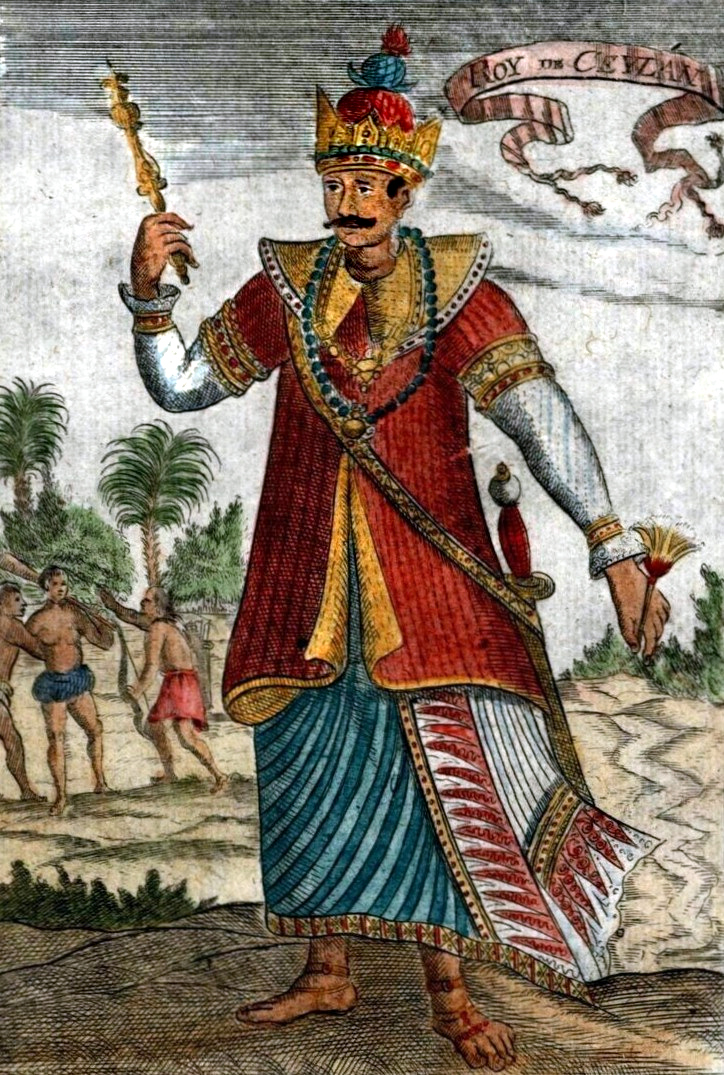
Vimaladharmasuriya I, reigned 1592–1604

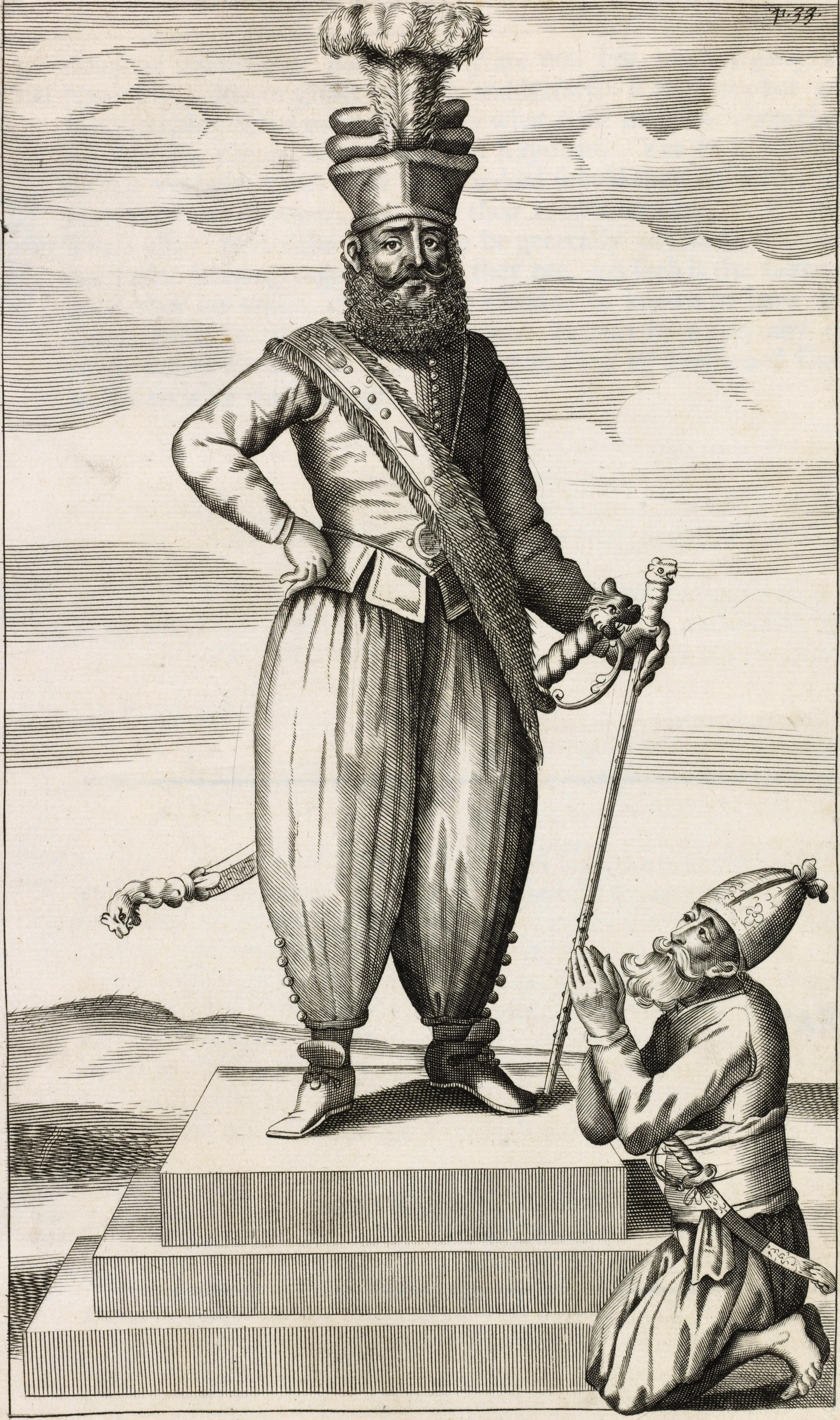
Rajasinghe II, reigned 1635–1687

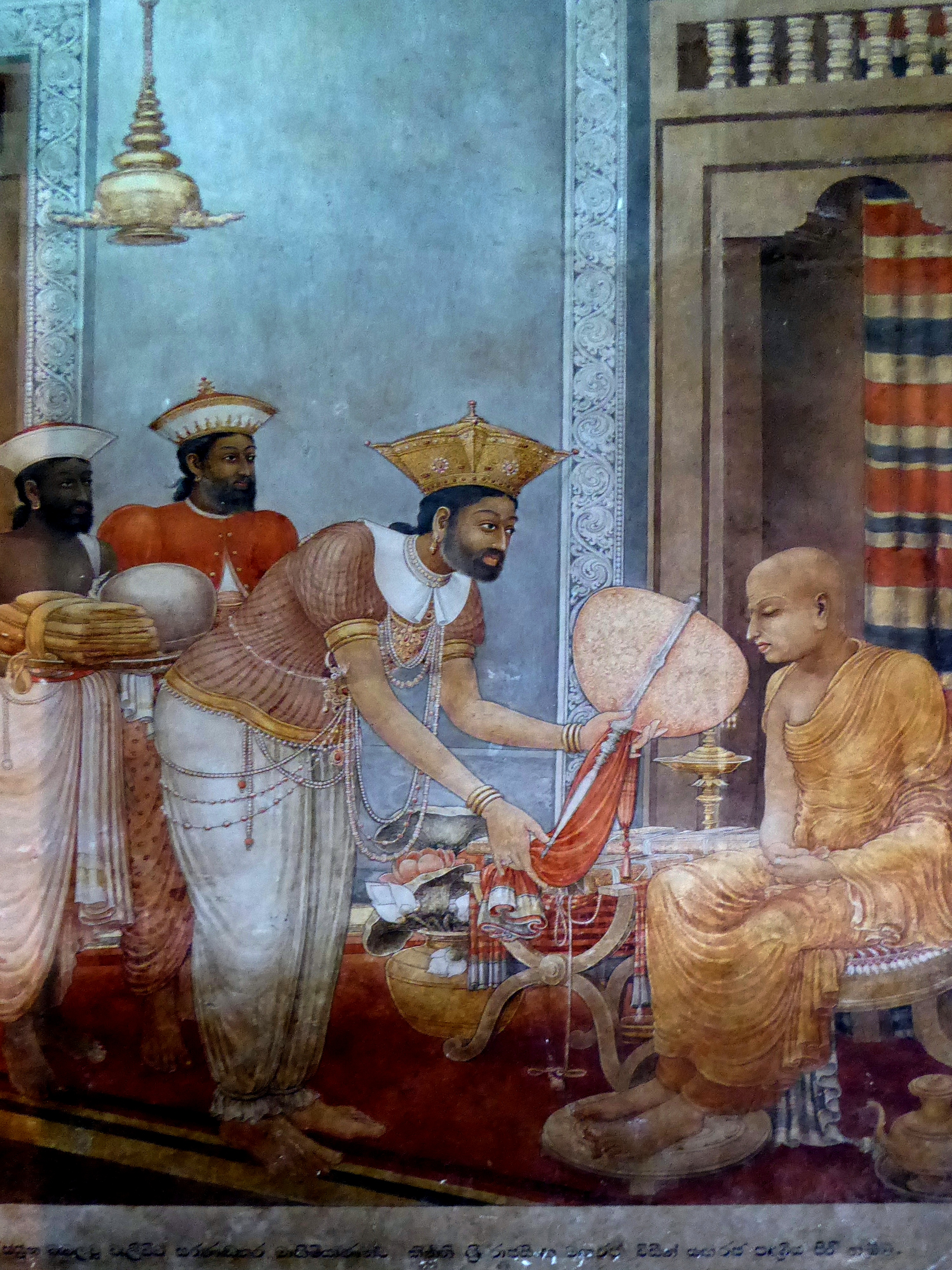
Kirti Sri Rajasinha, reigned 1747–1782

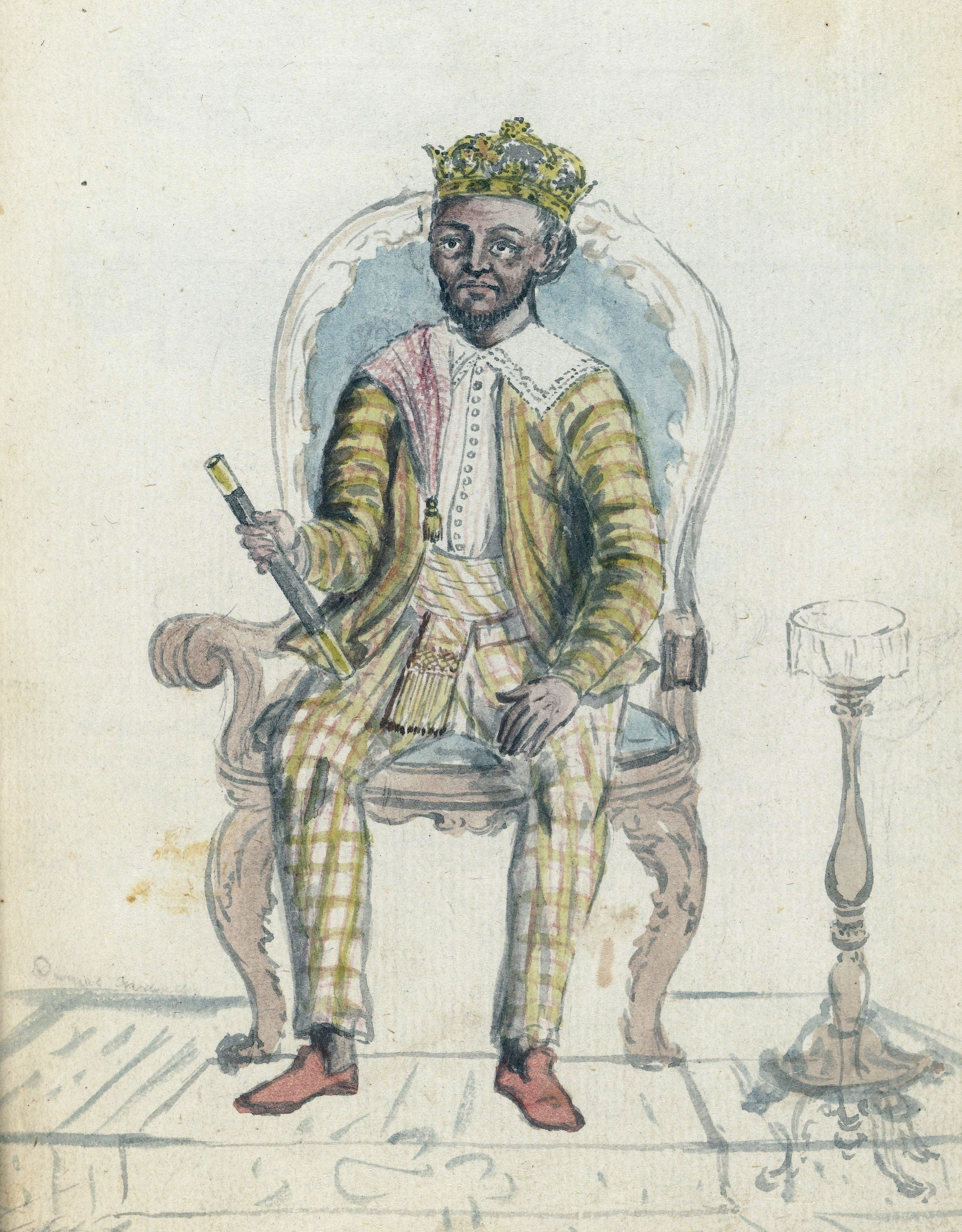
Sri Rajadhi Rajasinha, reigned 1782–1798

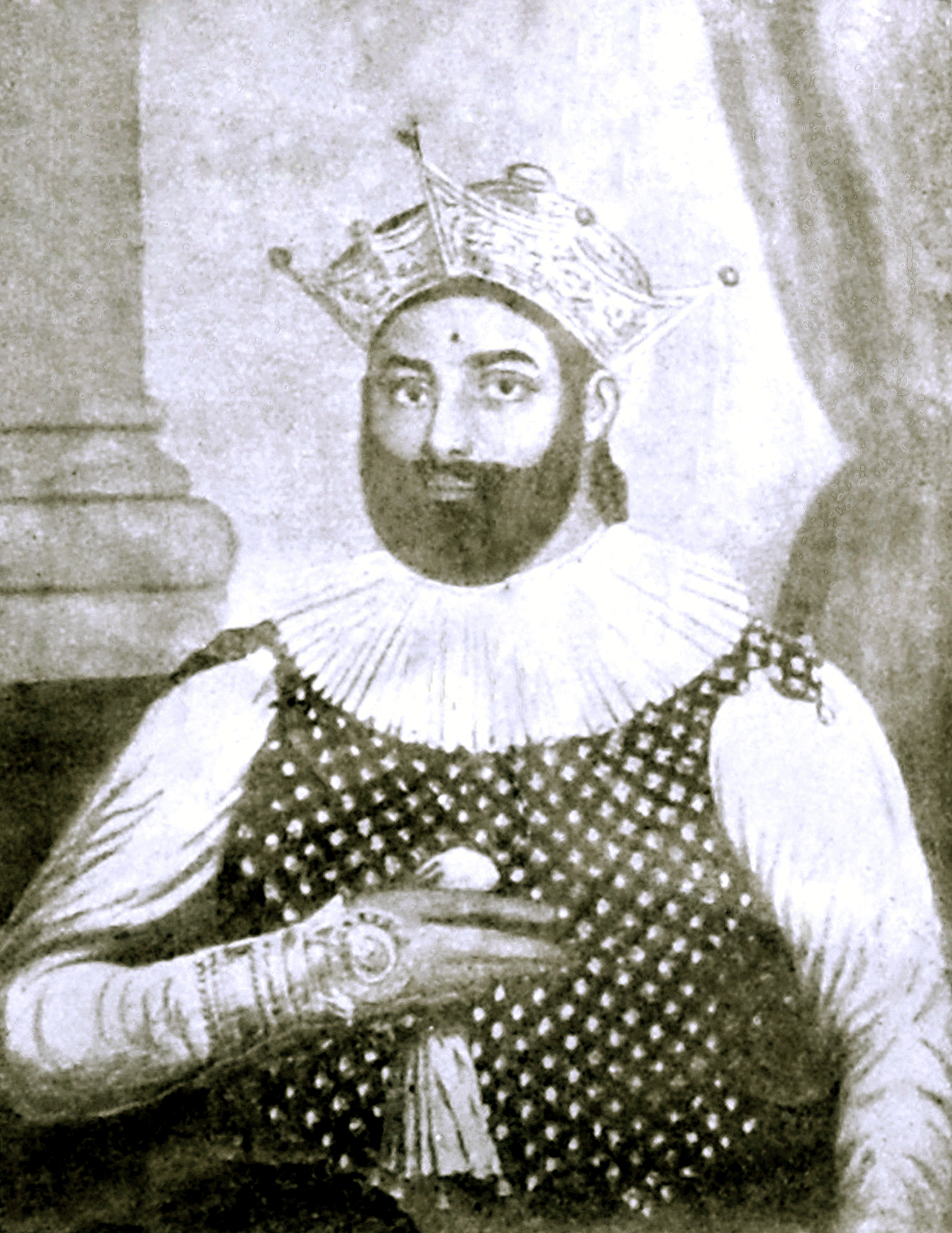
Sri Vikrama Rajasinha, reigned 1798–1815

=== Offices of state ===
The king would appoint persons deemed trustworthy and capable to high offices of state.

Maha Adigar

The highest offices of state were that of the two Adikars (known as Adikarams) called Pallegampahe and Udagampahe, holding equal powers and privileges within their jurisdiction. The Pallegampahe Adikar held precedence over the Udagampahe Adikar. The Adikars are distinguished from the other chiefs with the honour of the title of Maha Nilame (Great Officer). There was no time limit for the office holder as he held the post at the pleasure of the king, which meant throughout his life, if not incurred the displeasure of the king. The police and the jails were under their control. Adikars were consulted on the appointment of all other chiefs, the chief priest as well as for grants of lands, or rewards for services. It was not hereditary, although members of the same family have been appointed.

Dissava

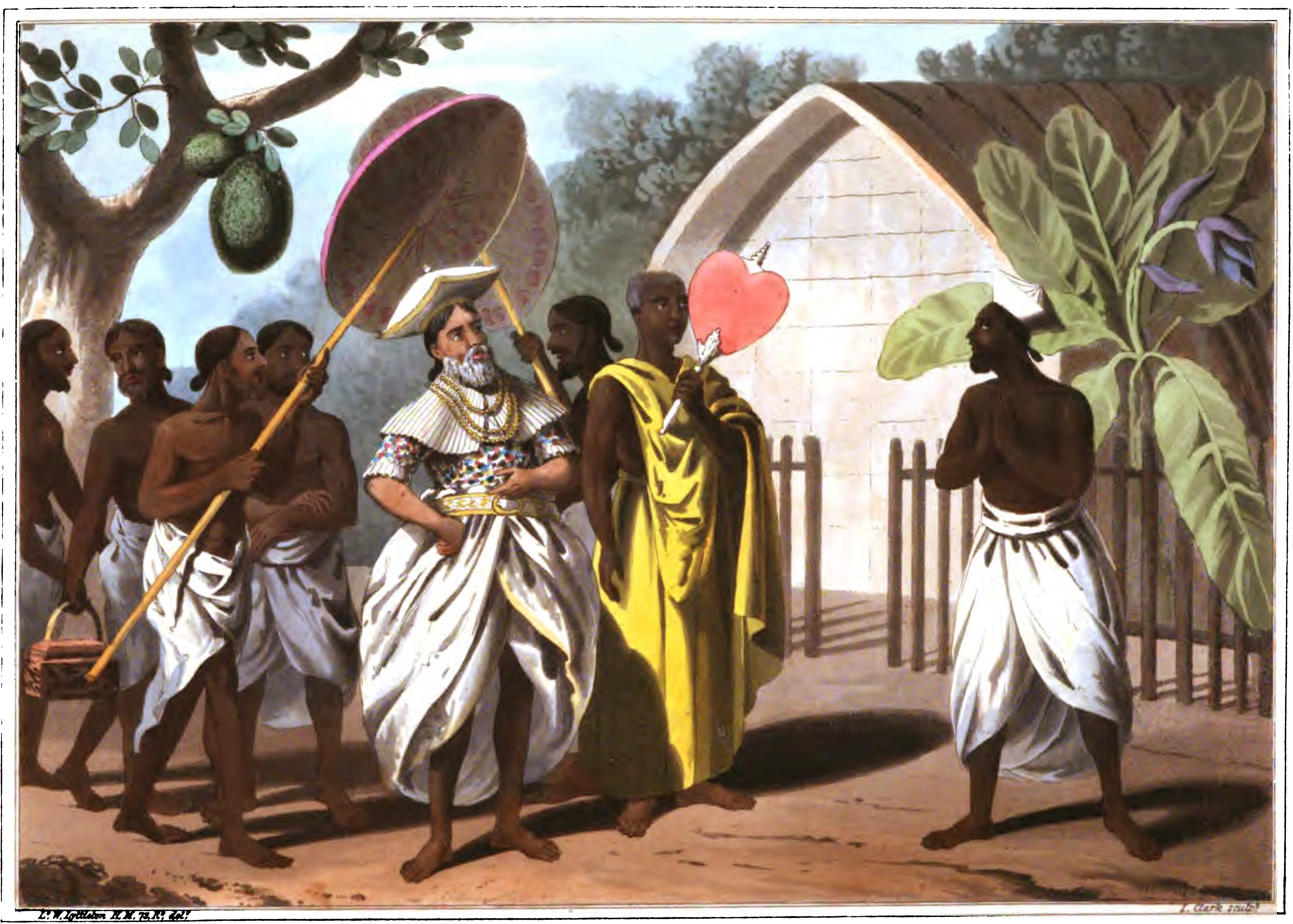
An illustration of a Kandyan Dissava and a Buddhist monk

Dissava were provincial governors. The Kandyan kingdom consisted of twenty-one provinces of which twelve principles are called Desavonies with each placed under a chief called a Dissava who served as its governor.

Appointed by the king, a Dissava had administrative and judicial authority both civil and criminal over the Desavonies as king's personal representative. They had jurisdiction over all persons and lands within their province, except for those attached to the king's court or household. There was no time limit for the office holder as he held the post at the pleasure of the king, which meant throughout his life, if not incurred the displeasure of the king. It was not hereditary, although members of the same family have been appointed.

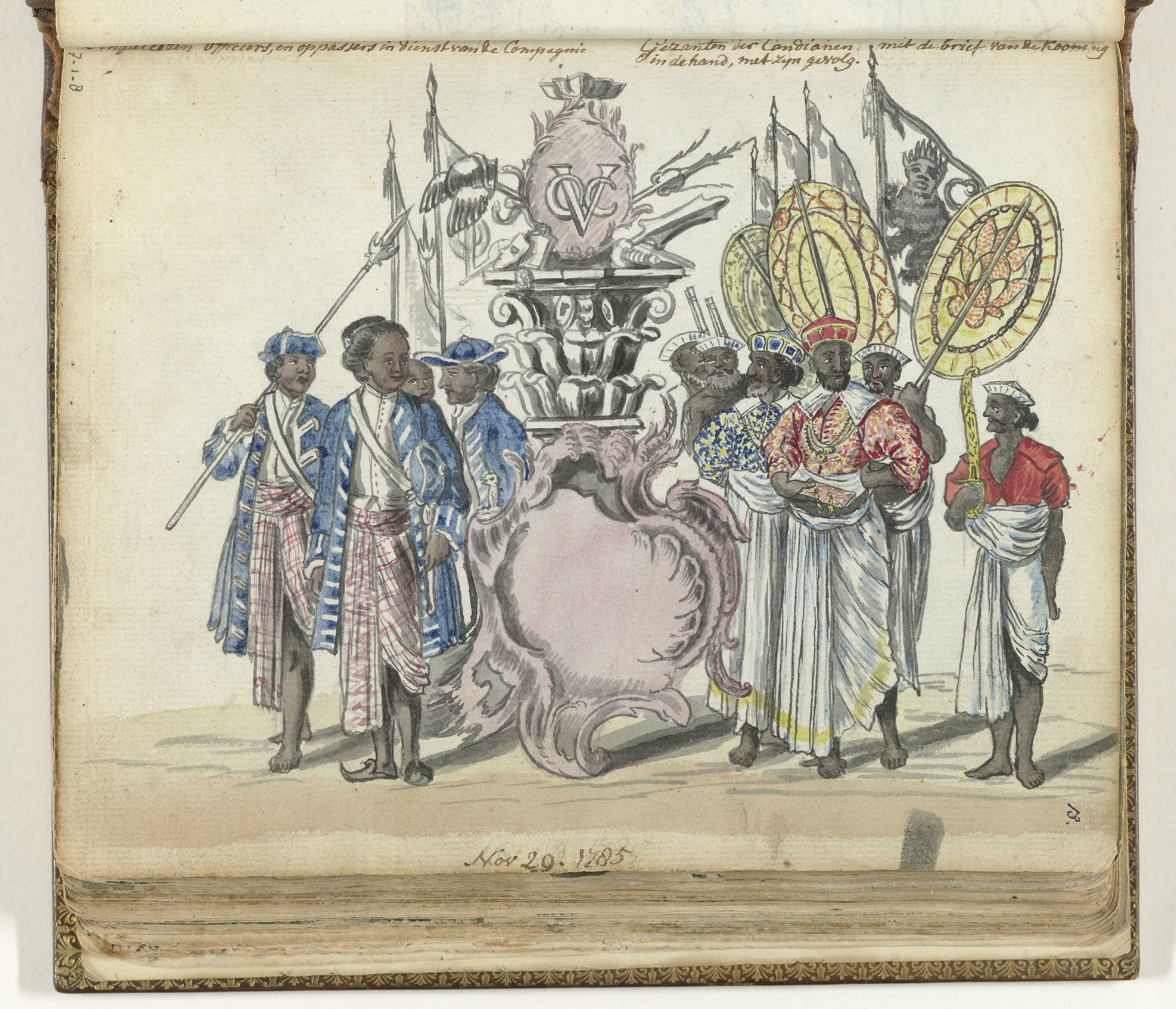
Dutch drawing of Sinhalese officers and Kandyan ambassadors in 1785

Maha Lekam

(Chief Secretary in Sinhala) was the chief of departments of the Kandyan kingdom.

Rate Mahatmaya

Rate Mahaththayas were governors of smaller districts namely Udunuwara, Hewaheta, Yatinuwara, Kotmale, Tunpanahe, Dumbara.

Diyawadana Nilame

Diyawadana Nilame was an officer of the royal household, charged with safeguarding and carrying out ancient rituals for the Sacred Tooth Relic of the Buddha. The Diyawadana Nilame has the responsibility of overseeing all aspects of the Sri Dalada Maligawa. Among his principal duties was the organization of the annual pageant, the Kandy Esala Perahera.

=== Judiciary ===
The judicial system of the Kingdom of Kandy operated within the broader administrative framework of the state and was based primarily on customary law rather than written legal codes. Legal norms were transmitted largely through oral tradition, and commonly accepted customs functioned as law. Justice was administered through a hierarchy of judicial bodies and officials, with ultimate authority vested in the king.

==== Judicial hierarchy ====
The administration of justice in the Kandyan Kingdom functioned through a hierarchical structure that extended from localized dispute-resolution bodies to the supreme judicial authority of the monarch.

- Gamsabha – The lowest and most localized judicial body, composed of respected elders of a village. The Gamsabha dealt with minor civil disputes and offenses such as petty theft, boundary disputes, debts, and interpersonal quarrels. Its proceedings emphasized reconciliation, restitution, and the restoration of social harmony rather than punitive sanctions.
- Rata Sabha – A regional assembly operating at the level of an administrative subdivision (*rata*). It addressed disputes relating to agriculture, land use, and matters of social conduct, including issues concerning marriage and communal obligations. The Rata Sabha functioned as an intermediary forum between village assemblies and higher authorities.
- Judicial authority of Disavas – Disavas, the provincial governors of the Kandyan Kingdom, exercised limited judicial authority within their respective territories. Their jurisdiction extended over persons and land within their divisions and was subject to customary limitations and oversight by higher judicial authorities.
- Maha Naduwa (Great Court) – The principal central judicial institution of the kingdom and the highest constituted court below the king. The Maha Naduwa consisted of senior chiefs and officials and heard cases referred by the monarch as well as matters brought directly before it. Its jurisdiction extended over major civil and criminal cases.
- Royal judicial authority – The king functioned as the supreme judicial authority and final court of appeal. He exercised exclusive jurisdiction over grave crimes such as treason, rebellion, conspiracy, and homicide, as well as disputes involving principal chiefs and members of the royal household. Subjects were permitted to petition the king directly, and royal intervention served as a corrective mechanism against unjust decisions by subordinate officials.

In addition to these bodies, sources refer to the Sakki Balanda, an ad hoc tribunal of inquiry convened in certain circumstances to investigate the causes of death within a locality. Due to the limited information available, it appears to have functioned as an investigative body rather than a permanent or standing court.

=== Administrative divisions ===
The Kandyan kingdom was divided into 21 provinces, 12 Disavanis and 9 Ratas. Ratas were smaller administrative divisions in close proximity to the central government and governed by a Rate Mahatmaya, while Disavanis were larger, further away and governed by a Dissava (governor), acting as a representative of the king. Each disavani and rata was divided into Korales and the Korales in turn were divided into Pattu (singular, pattuva). Each pattuva consisted of a large number of villages which varied in extant and composition. Each division existed as part of the Kingdom of Kotte prior to the independence of Kandy.

Each Disavani was entitled to have a distinct flag and each Disava was preceded by his particular flag while he was travelling in his disavani symbolizing their power and authority. Rate Mahatmaya had vastly lessor power and authority including that of not having the right to a flag.

Hierarchy of Kandyan administrative districts
Primary	Secondary	Tertiary	Quaternary
Disavani (දිසාවානි)	Korale (කෝරලේ)	Pattu (පත්තු)	Gama (ගම)
Ratas (රට)	Korale (කෝරලේ)	Pattu (පත්තු)	Gama (ගම)

Provinces of the Kandyan kingdom at 1815
Flag	Name (in Sinhala)	Span as part of Kandy	Largest or most notable city	Approximate extent in terms of modern locations	Notes
Maha Disavani
	Satara Kōralēs (සතර කෝරළය)	~1594–1815	Kegalle	Roughly coterminous with the northern part of Kegalle District	(Note: The original Koral was much larger divided over the borderlands of the Kandy and Kotte kingdoms and later between Kandy and the Portuguese and Dutch occupied territories.)
	Sat Kōralēs (සත් කෝරලේ)	~1592–1815	Kurunegala	Roughly coterminous with the North Western Province. Maritime portion of the province partitioned with the Treaty of Batticaloa (1766).	
	Ūva (ඌව)	~1592–1815	Badulla	Roughly coterminous with the south-westen parts of Badulla & Monaragala Districts. Maritime portion of the province partitioned with the Treaty of Batticaloa (1766).	
	Sabaragamuwa (සබරගමුව)	~1592–1815	Ratnapura	Roughly coterminous with the Ratnapura District	
Sulu Disavani
	Matale (මාතලේ)	~16th Century–1815	Matale	Roughly coterminous with Matale District and parts of Polonnaruwa District	
	Tun Kōralēs (තුන් කෝරලේ)	?–1815	Deraniyagala	Roughly coterminous with the south-western part of Kegalle District	
	Valapane (වලපනේ)	1469–1815	Walapane	Roughly coterminous with the Walapane Divisional Secretariat	(Note: Then known as Sagama Tungama, combined with Hevāhäṭa, was one of the original 5 ratas at independence)
	Uḍapalāta (උඩපලාත)	1469–1815	Gampola	Roughly coterminous with the Ganga Ihala Korale, Udapalatha and Pathahewaheta Divisional Secretariats.	(Note: Then known as Siduruwana, combined with Uḍunuvara, was one of the original 5 ratas at independence)
	Nuvarakalaviya (නුවරකලාවිය)	?–1815	Anuradhapura	Roughly coterminous with the Anuradhapura District. Maritime portion of the province partitioned with the Treaty of Batticaloa (1766).	
	Vellassa (වෙල්ලස්ස)	?–1815	Ampara	Roughly coterminous with the Batticaloa District, northern part of Ampara District, northern part of Badulla District & part of the Polonnaruwa District. Maritime portion of the province partitioned with the Treaty of Batticaloa (1766).	
	Bintänna (බිංතැන්න)	?–1815	Batticaloa (formerly)	Roughly coterminous with the northern part of Monaragala District & southern part of Ampara District. Maritime portion of the province partitioned with the Treaty of Batticaloa (1766).	
	Tamankaduva (තමන්කඩුව)	?–1815	Trincomalee (formerly), Polonnaruwa	Roughly coterminous with the Polonnaruwa District. Maritime portion of the province partitioned with the Treaty of Batticaloa (1766).	
Rata
	Uḍunuvara (උඩුනුවර)	1469–1815	Gelioya	Roughly coterminous with the Udunuwara Divisional Secretariat.	(Note: Then known as Siduruwana, combined with Uḍapalāta, was one of the original 5 ratas at independence)
	Yaṭinuvara (යටිනුවර)	1469–1815	The city of Kandy	Roughly coterminous with the city of Kandy and the Divisional Secretariats of Yatinuwara, Kandy Four Gravets and Gangawata Korale and Kundasale	(Note: One of the original 5 ratas at independence)
	Tumpane (තුම්පනේ)	?–1815		Roughly coterminous with the Thumpane Divisional Secretariat.	
	Hārrispattuwa (හාරිස්පත්තුව)	1469–1815			(Note: Then known as Balawita, was one of the original 5 ratas at independence)
	Dumbara (දුම්බර)	1469–1815		Roughly coterminous with the Panvila, Medadumbara, Udadumbara and Minipe Divisional Secretariats.	(Note: One of the original 5 ratas at independence)
	Hevāhäṭa (හේවාහැට)	1469–1815			(Note: Then known as Sagama Tungama, combined with Valapane, was one of the original 5 ratas at independence)
	Kotmale (කොත්මලේ)	?–1815			
	Uḍa Bulatgama (උඩ බුලත්ගම)	?–1815		Roughly coterminous with the central part of Kegalle District	
	Pāta Bulatgama (පාත බුලත්ගම)	?–1815			

=== Military ===
The Kingdom of Kandy did not maintain a large standing army. The king maintained a full-time Royal Guard at the palace. In the provinces, local garrisons were maintained to guard strategic mountain passes or to suppress rebellions. During times of war or military campaign, these would be supplemented with local militia.

Kandyan forces, throughout their history, relied heavily on the mountainous terrain of the kingdom and primarily engaged in guerrilla-style hit-and-run attacks, ambushes, and quick raids. One of the hallmarks of the clashes between the kingdom and its European foes was the inability of either side to take and hold land or to permanently cut off supply routes, with the exception being the Dutch, who managed to do so for an extended period of time in 1762.

In the 16th and 17th century, the Kandyan kings relied on mercenaries, often Telugu military adventurers. With the arrival of the Nayakkars, large numbers of South Indian Tamil soldiers made up the king's personal guard. In addition to this, various Europeans were in the king's service during this period (including a master gunner), and large contingents of Malays, who were very highly regarded as fighters.

As for the armies, each of the local chieftains could call upon a militia that often accompanied them on their journeys around the kingdom. The bulk of the Kandyan army consisted of local peasant conscripts – irregulars pressed into service in times of war – who tended to bring with them around twenty days' worth of supplies and functioned in discrete units often out of contact with each other. One of the reasons for the Kandyan's inability to hold the land they captured was poor logistical support, as many soldiers had to return to base to replenish their supplies once they ran out.

By the 1760s bows and arrows had been phased out in favour of firearms. Kandyan gunsmiths specialised in manufacturing light flintlocks known as Bondikula with smaller bores than European guns, with their barrels extended for accuracy. Larger bondikula guns known as maha thuwakku were used as wall guns, they weighed around 28 kg and were mounted on a tripod where the gunner would rest the butt stock from the chest to the shoulder before firing. In addition to field artillery similar to that of Europeans, Kandyans also developed a unique form of light cannon better suited for mountain warfare called the kodithuwakkuwa which consisted of a gun barrel placed on a wooden stock supported by a wooden block or iron forelegs.

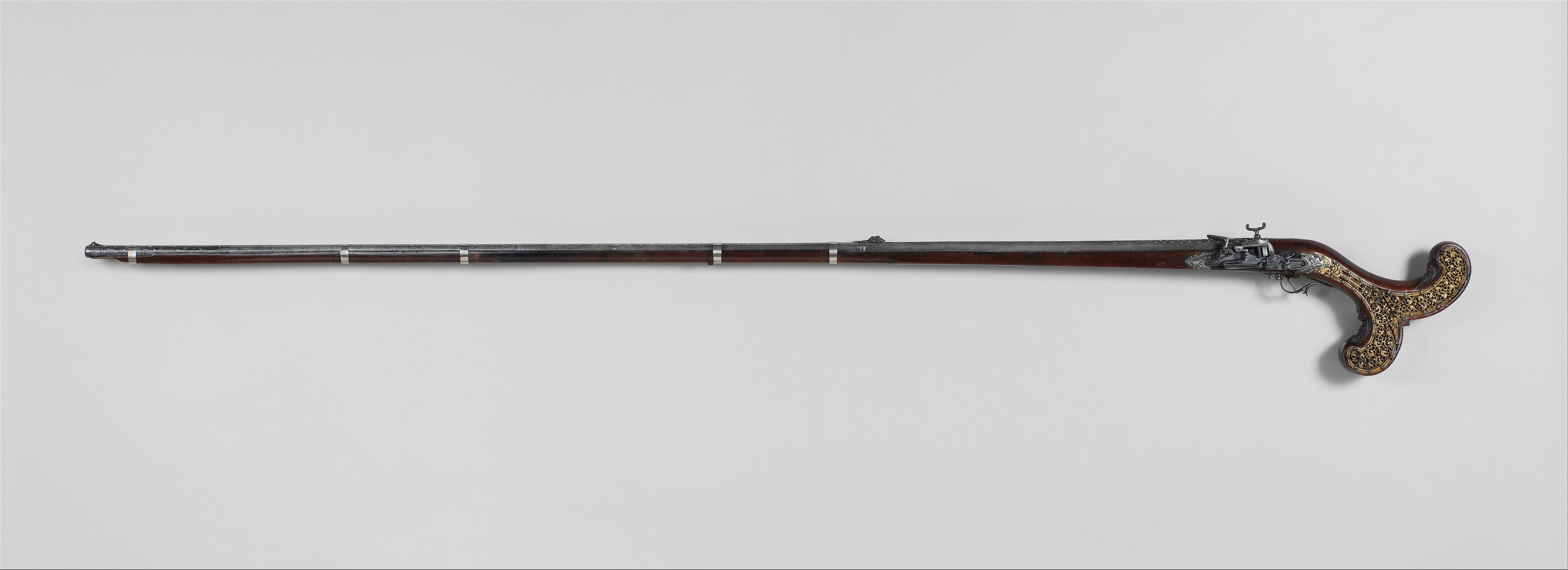
17th–18th Century flintlock Sinhalese Long Gun also known as a "Bondikula". The lock is situated to the left side and the bifurcated butt is a characteristic unique to Sinhalese guns. The gun has been extensively ornamented with silver and ivory panels carved with floral patterns.

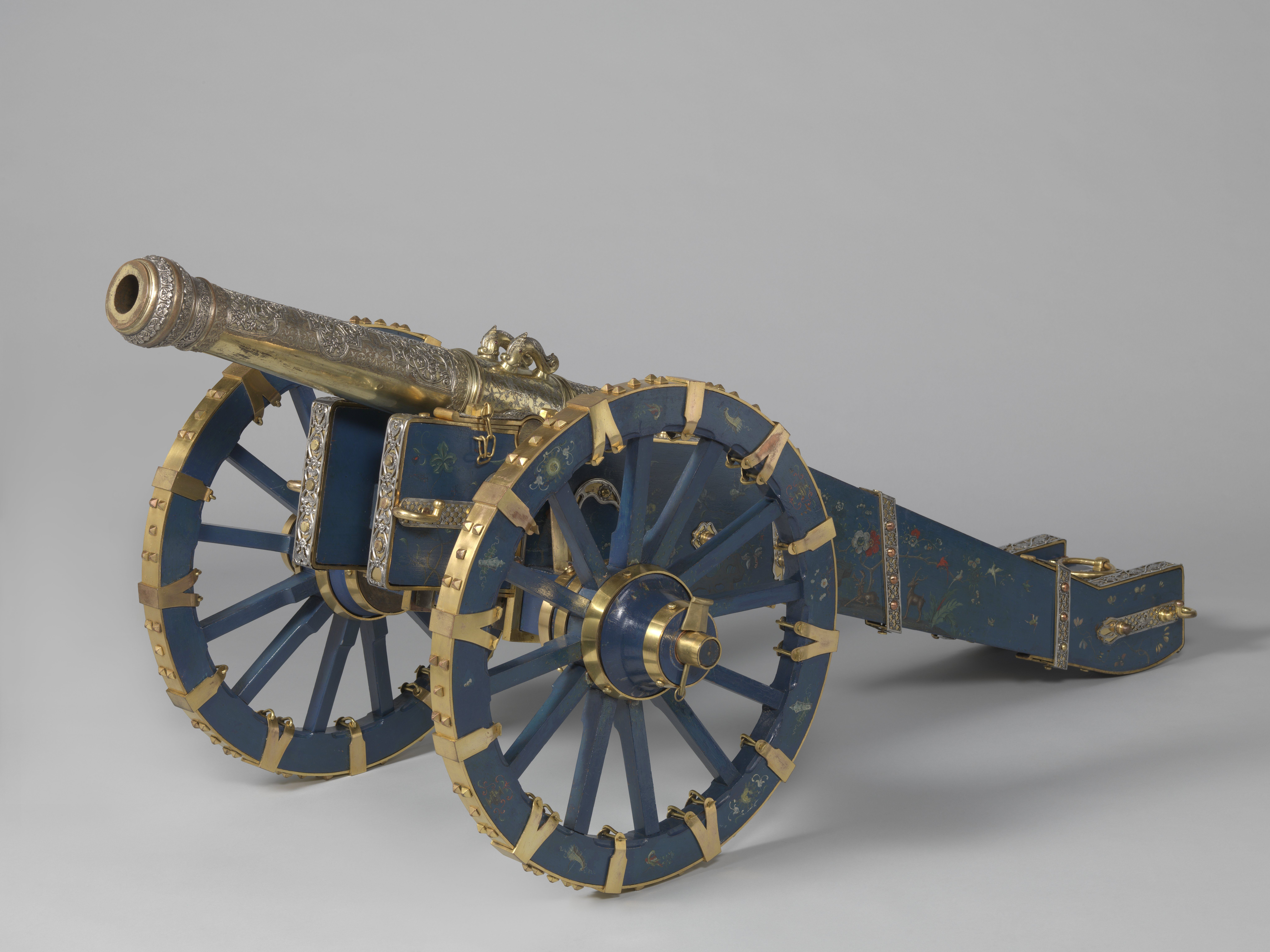
Exquisite Sinhalese bronze cannon with intricate silver and gold inlay, gifted to King Vijaya Rajasingha in 1745 by Lewuke, the Disawa or Lord of the four Korles district.

The War Flag of King Sri Wickrama Rajasinha captured by the British.

== Economy ==
During the reign of Vimaladharmasuriya I many steps were taken to develop and improve the economy of the Kingdom of Kandy. He took steps to improve the iron industry, the Uva Province and agriculture in places such as Kothmale, Walapane, Harispaththuwa, Uva, Hewaheta, Udunuwara, Yatinuwara and Ududumbara.

Imports of the Kandyan Kingdom included silk, tea, and sugar while exports included cinnamon, pepper and areca nut.

The Kingdom of Kandy used multiple currencies some of which originated from its predecessor, the Kingdom of Kotte. The silver coins ridi (Massa) and panama were introduced by the end of the 16th century while the gold coins ran panama and ran massa had been introduced earlier. Later the thangam massa, podi thangama, ridiya were introduced. By the 18th century the waragama originating from India and the copper coin salli became widespread with an exchange rate of one ridiya for sixty-four salli coins. The influence of the Dutch resulted in the Stuiver entering circulation gaining the name thuttu among Sinhalese. Hook-shaped coins the Larin were already in use during the Kingdom of Kotte and is believed to have been introduced by Persian traders. These were locally replicated as Angutu Massa with a silver finish.

== Demographics ==
=== Religions ===
The state religion was Buddhism. Due to the activities of the Portuguese, ordained Buddhist monks were absent by the Dutch era. After the arrival of the Nayak dynasty, Buddhism was again firmly established in the island. The dynasty of Vimaladharmasuriya I largely tolerated the presence of Christians, in particular Catholics fleeing Portuguese land following their occupation by the Dutch. On occasion, the Kandyan kings even protected Catholic agents, most famously Vimaladharmasuriya II's protection of Joseph Vaz. The religious environment, however, changed dramatically with the arrival of the Nayak dynasty. In 1743 Sri Vijaya Rajasinha ordered churches burned and commenced a general repression of the faith, which continued until Kirti Sri Rajasinha commanded its cessation.

== Society and culture ==
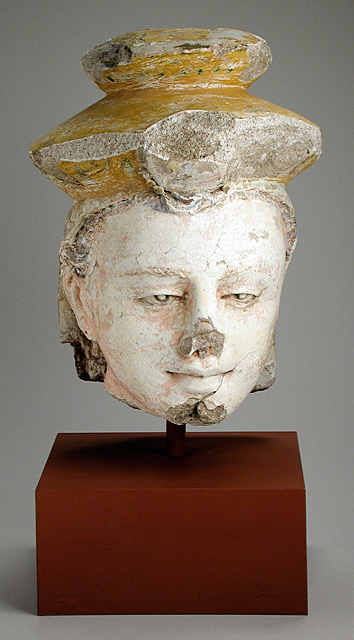
16th-century sculpture from the Kandyan period at Mahavihara Bingiriya, crafted from stucco and adorned with paint

=== Architecture ===
Kandyan architecture refers to the distinctive style of building used in the Kandyan Kingdom. This style was heavily influenced by the architectural traditions of the Malabar region in South India, reflecting the close cultural and political ties between the two regions at the time. Unlike stone, wood served as the primary building material, in keeping with the practices of Malabar architecture.

The audience hall is a great example of how Kandyan architecture adapted to its environment. The structure was supported by intricately carved wooden pillars that were later replicated in stone at the Temple of the Tooth. Additionally, Kandyan architecture featured long verandahs supported by pillars made of various materials, including wood, stone, or masonry. These structures had peaked roofs and overhanging eaves to protect the walls from the elements. The Lankatilaka Vihara stands as a prime example of this distinctive architectural style.

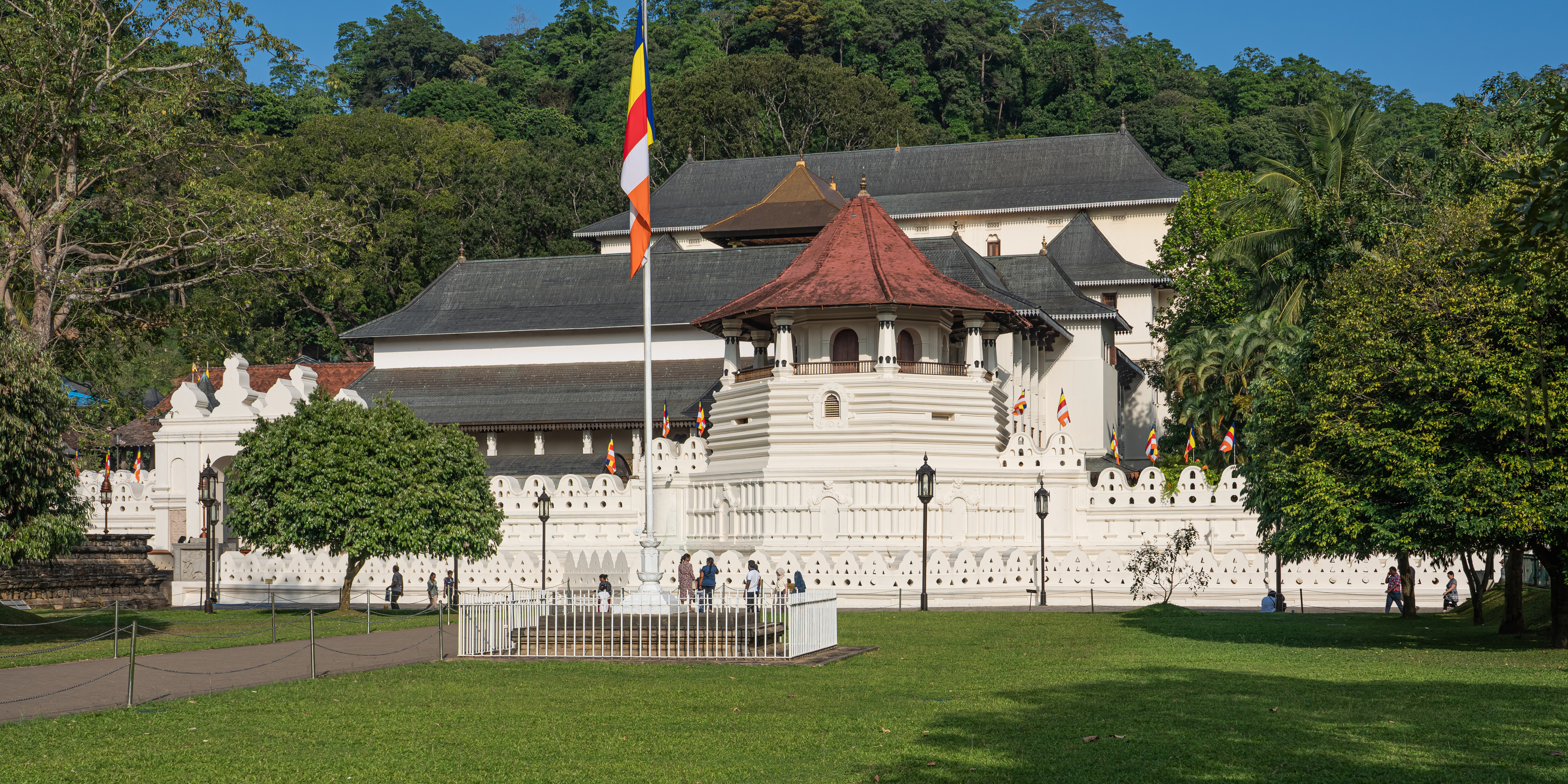
Temple of the Tooth is the focal point of Buddhism in Sri Lanka.

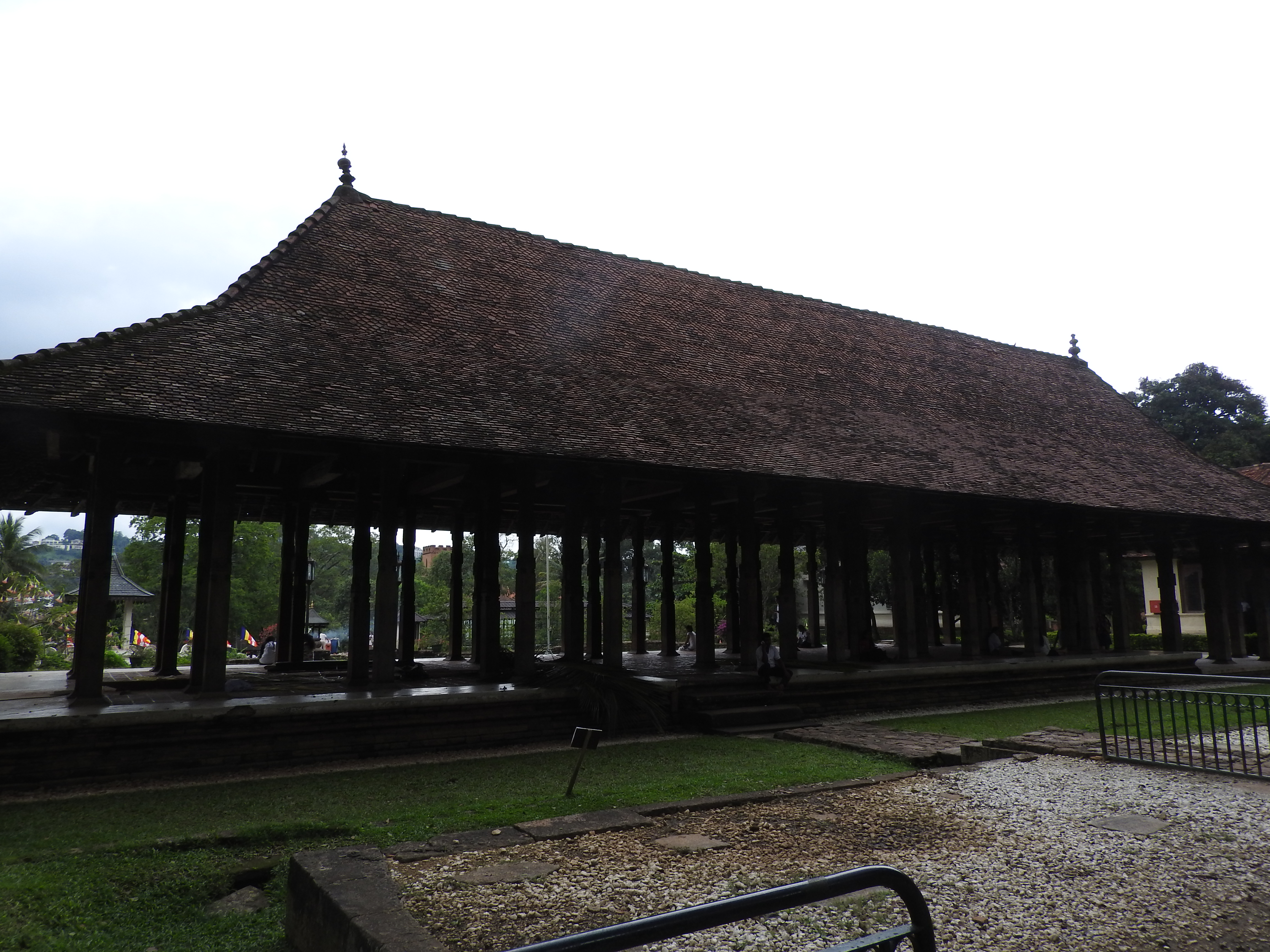
The audience hall of Kandyan Royal Palace

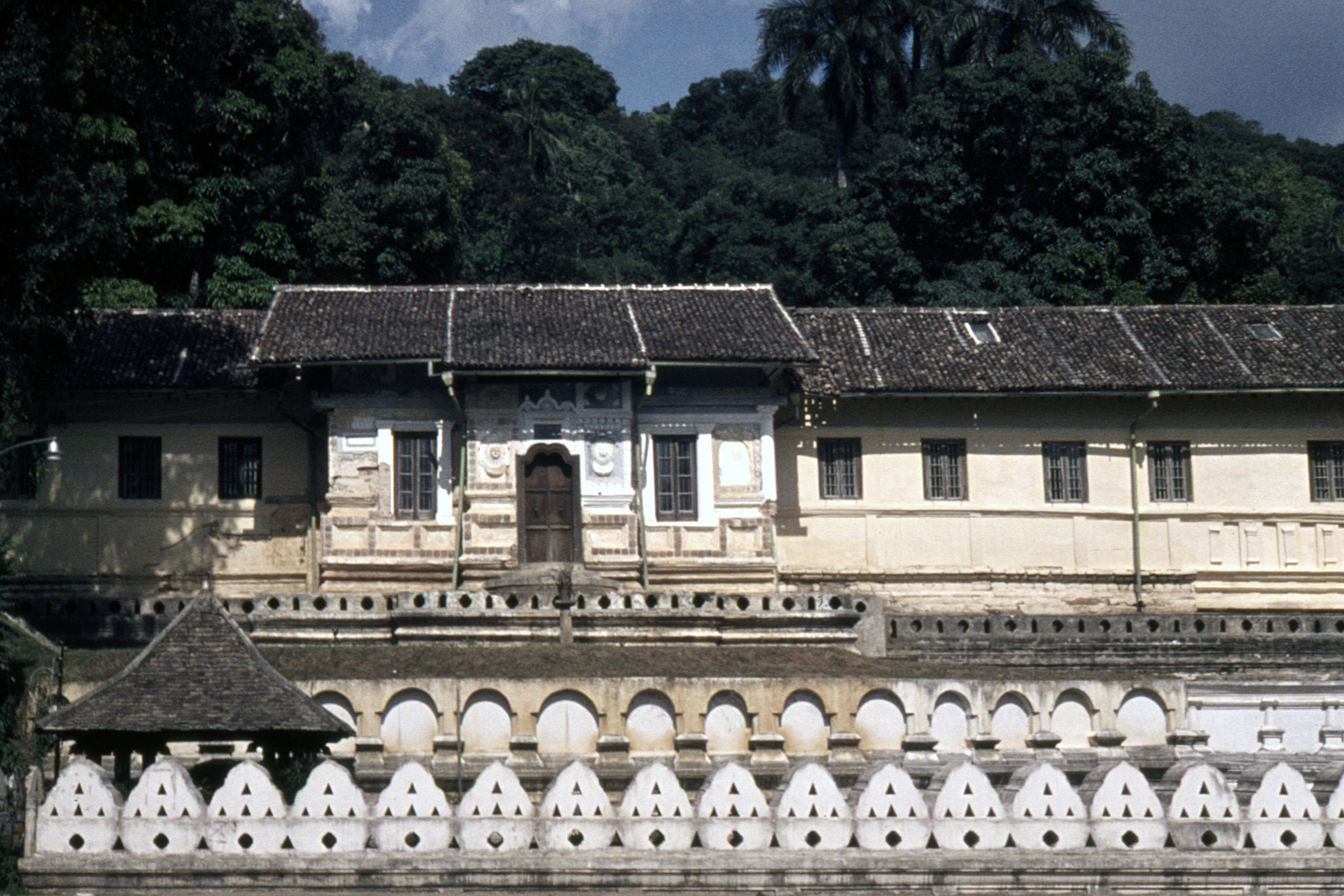
An old photograph of the King's Quarters in the Kandyan Royal Palace, known as the Maha Wasala

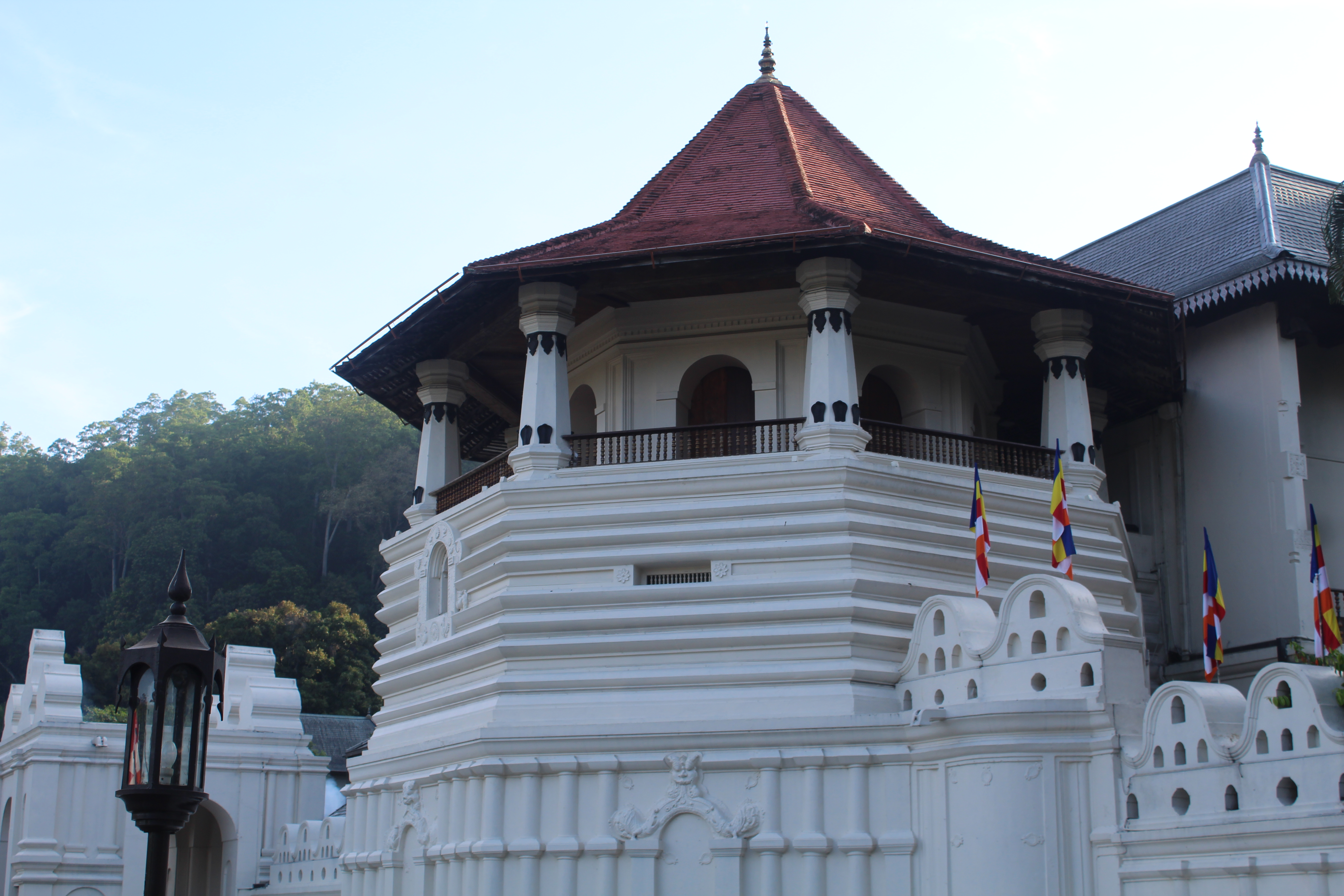
The octagonal pavilion of the Kandyan Royal palace

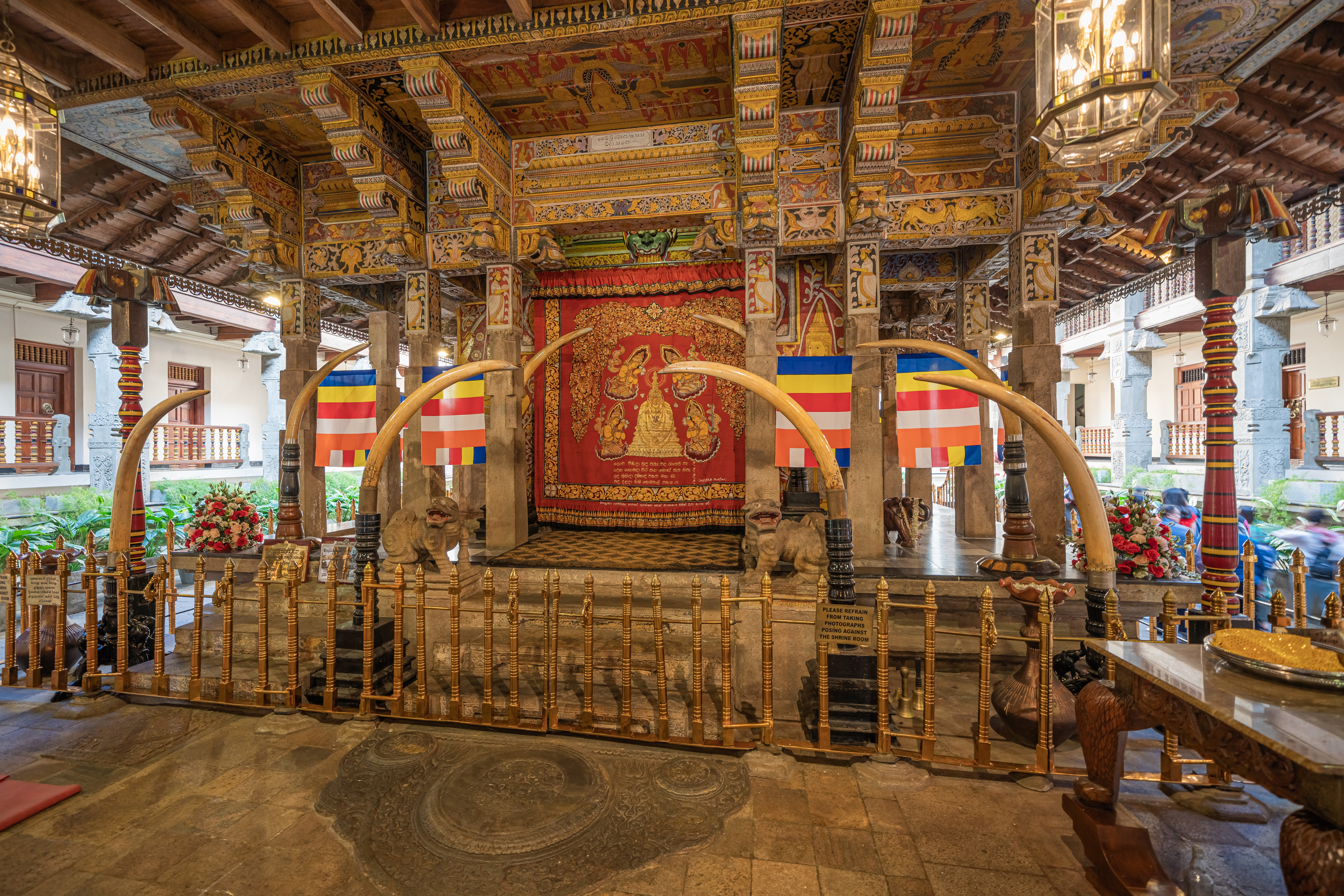
Interior of the Temple of the Tooth, Kandy. Successive kings expanded and improved the temple throughout the Kandyan kingdom's existence.

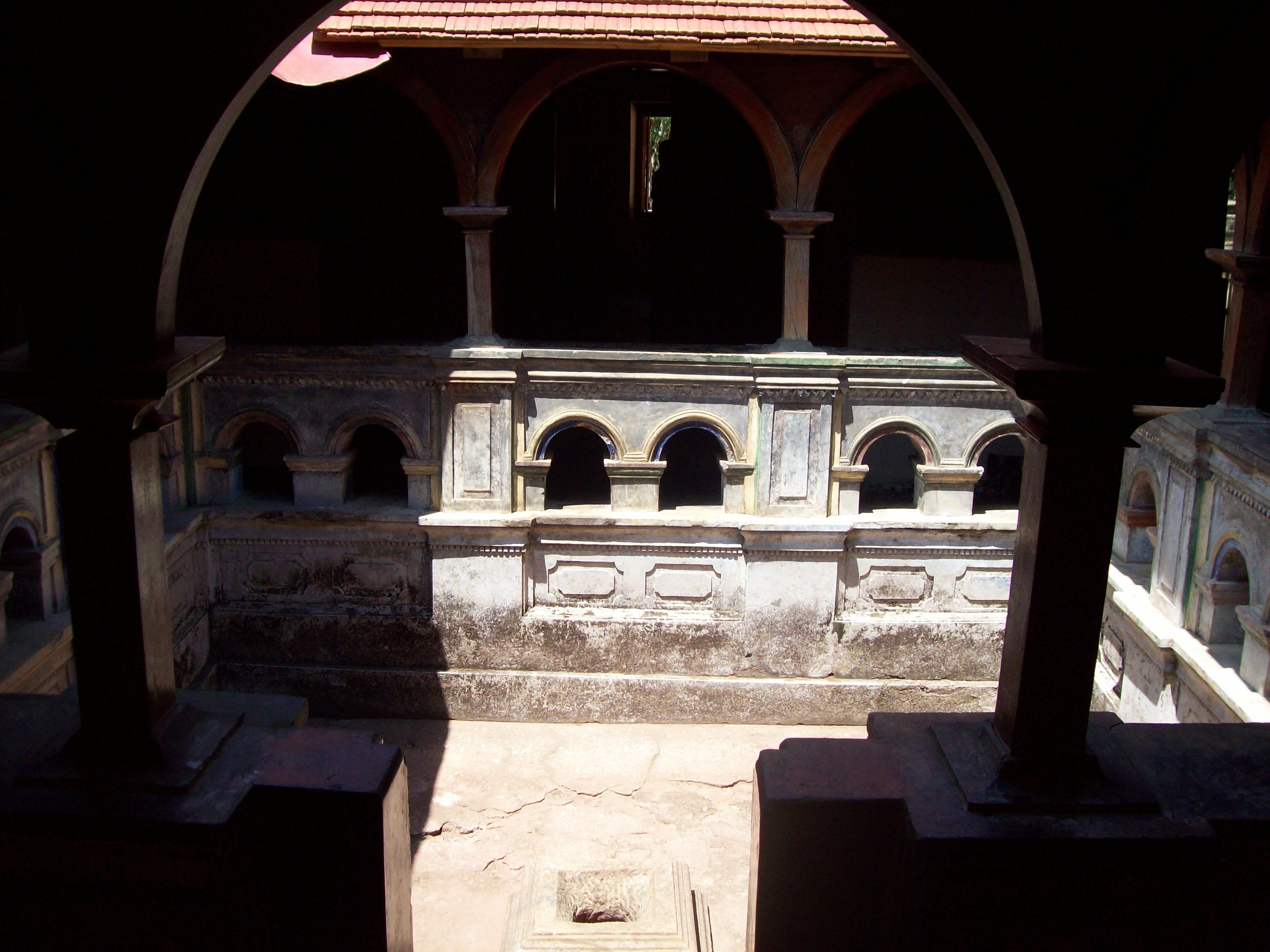
A central courtyard in Maduwanwela Walawwa

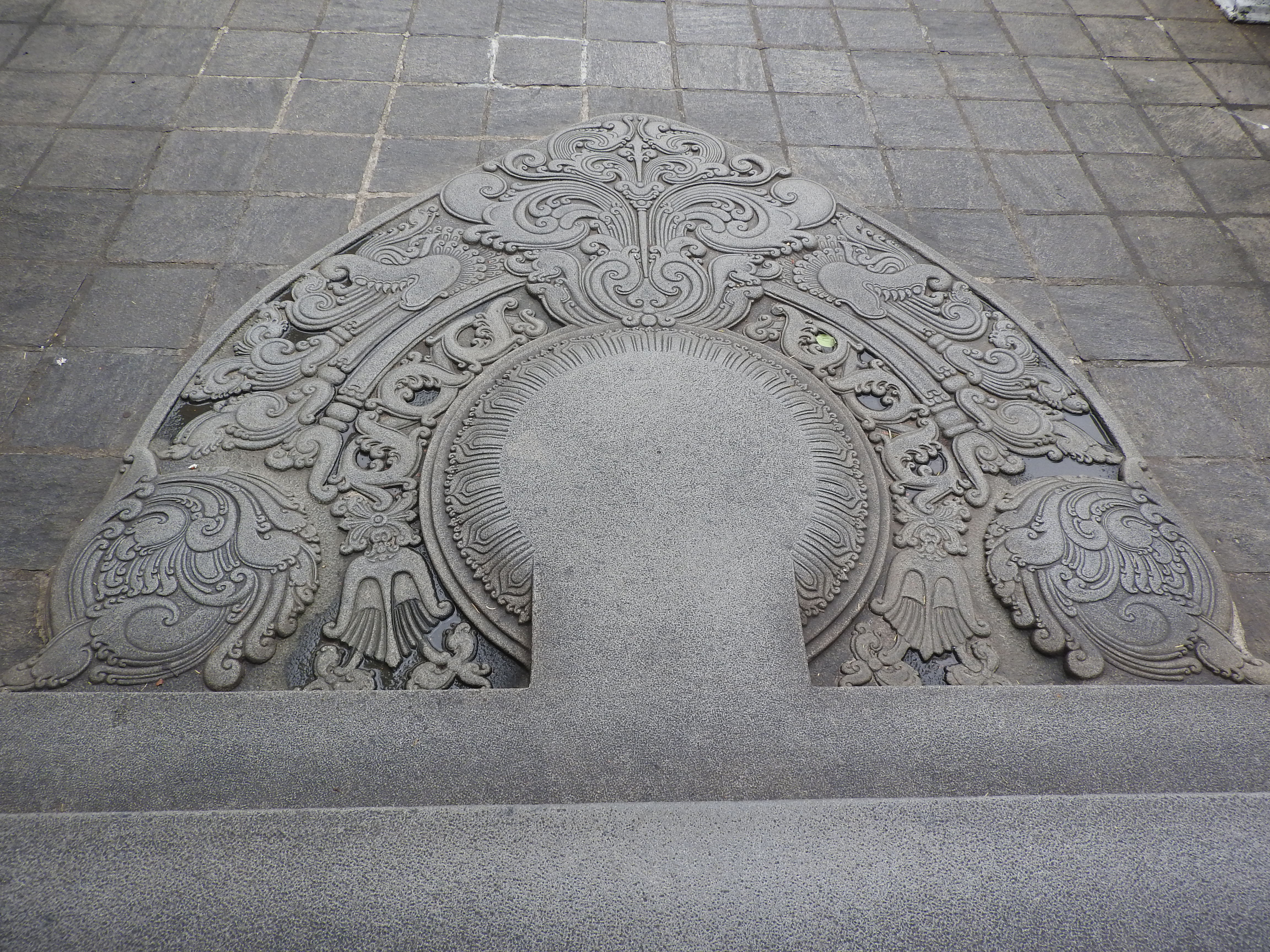
Moonstone

Kandyan architects made a significant contribution to Buddhist architecture by introducing Tampita Viharas—image-houses built on raised platforms. These structures became a defining feature of Kandyan Buddhist temples. Typically, a Kandyan temple complex included a pansala (residence for bhikkhus), a vihara for the image-house, and a stupa or dagoba. However, some temples did not have a dagoba. Furthermore, nearly every temple had a devale, a shrine dedicated to a Hindu deity. In many cases, the statue of the Hindu god was housed under the same roof as the Buddha's image, reflecting a harmonious blend of religious traditions.

The residences of the common people were modest, consisting of one-story buildings, and the most basic ones having only a solitary room. These abodes consisted of mud walls built around a wooden frame, thatched roofs, and polished floors made by blending mud and cow-dung. The upper class lived in more refined structures called walawwas, which often had unpolished windows on the interior walls. The rooms in walawwas were usually organized around a central courtyard known as hataras midula, which remained uncovered to the sky.

During the Kandyan Kingdom, sculptural art was generally regarded as less impressive compared to the works of the Anuradhapura and Polonnaruwa periods. This is especially evident in the moonstones that were created during this era. These moonstones lost much of their earlier symbolic significance and were reduced to decorative elements, featuring varied shapes and patterns. notable example is the moonstones at the Temple of the Tooth, which have elongated ends and display a highly conventionalized style. There is no direct artistic continuity between the traditions of Sigiriya, Polonnaruwa, and the Kandyan Kingdom.

=== Painting ===
During the reign of the Kandyan Kingdom in Sri Lanka, traditional artistic conventions were carefully preserved and passed down through generations of skilled artists. Kandyan paintings of this period were characterized by two-dimensional composition, strong linear emphasis, and the use of vibrant, pure colors despite a limited palette—resulting in a striking visual impact.

The frescoes at Degaldoruwa and the Ridi Viharaya in Kurunegala were the notable examples of traditional Kandyan art, created by the talented monk, Devaragampola Silvaththana between 1771 and 1776. The Dambulla cave temple was also redecorated in the eighteenth century in a similar artistic style. Other significant works, such as those at the Kaballalena temple in Kurunegala, the shrines at Mulkirigala in Hambantota, the Totagamuva Rajamahāvihara in Telvatta, and the Sailabimbaramaya in Dodanduwa, are attributed to artists influenced by Silvaththana's school.

These paintings, while rooted in the Kandyan tradition, reveal subtle variations in technique and style, suggesting the contributions of multiple artists and workshops. Kandyan paintings of this era thus represent both continuity and diversity within Sri Lanka's rich artistic heritage.

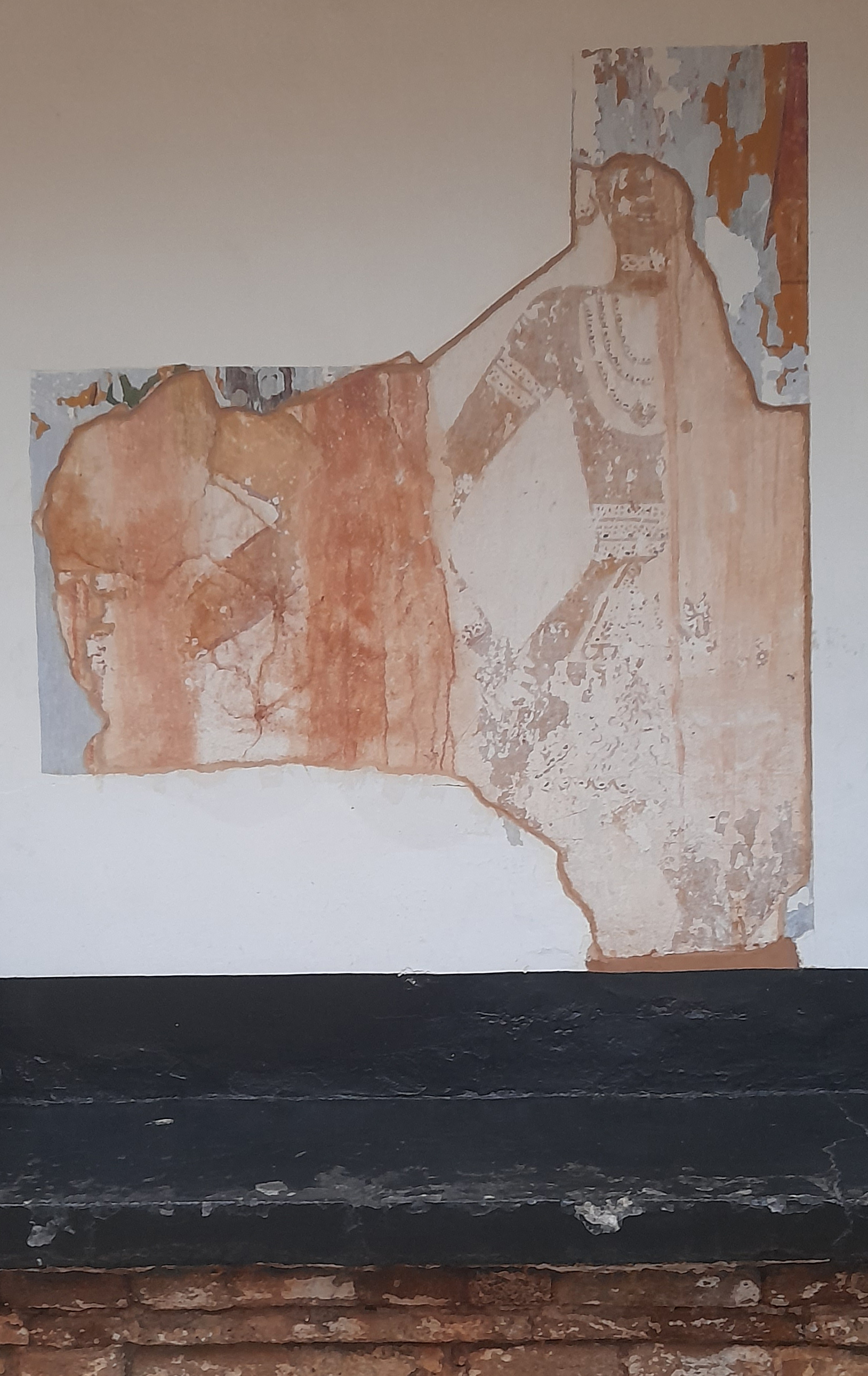

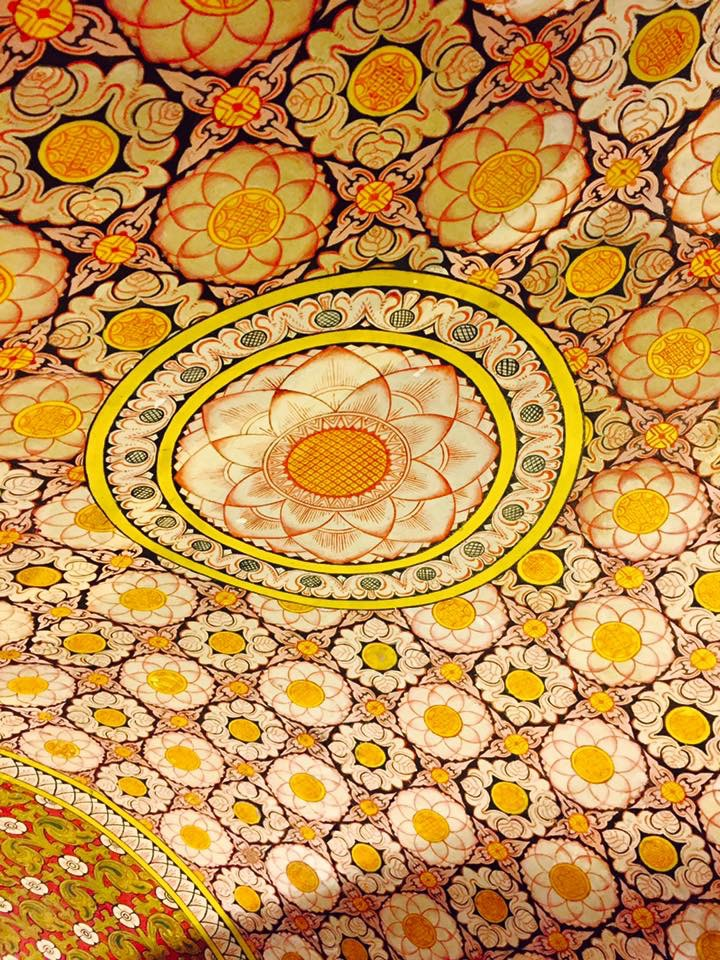

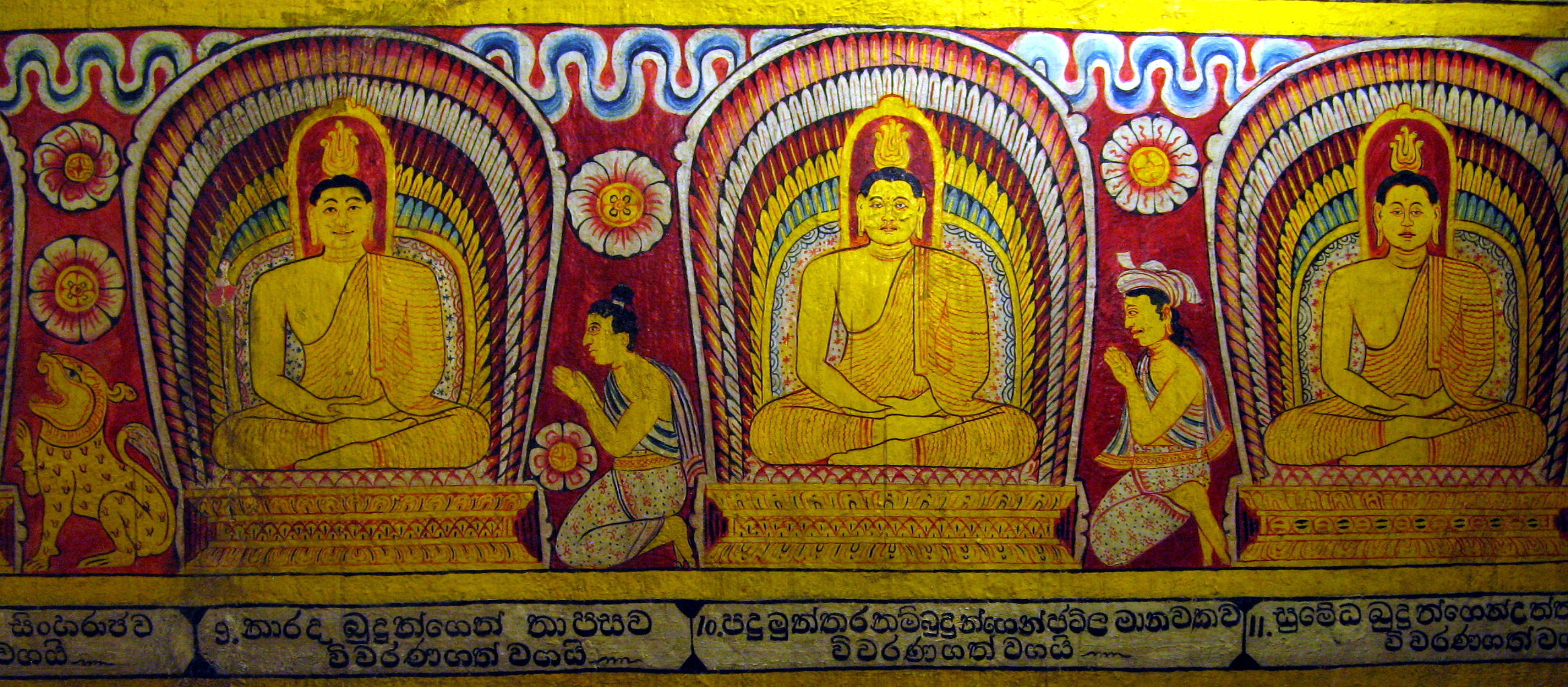

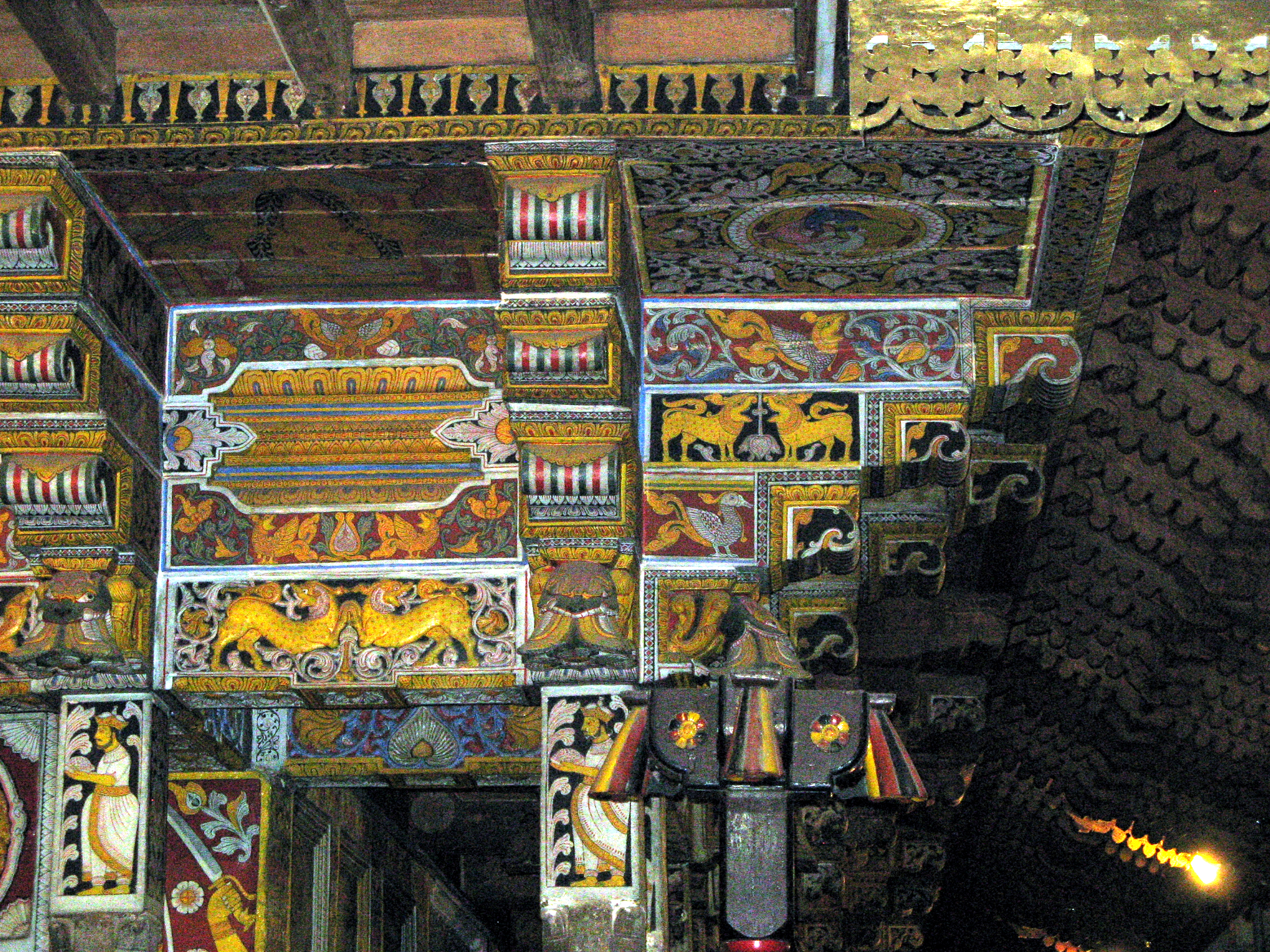

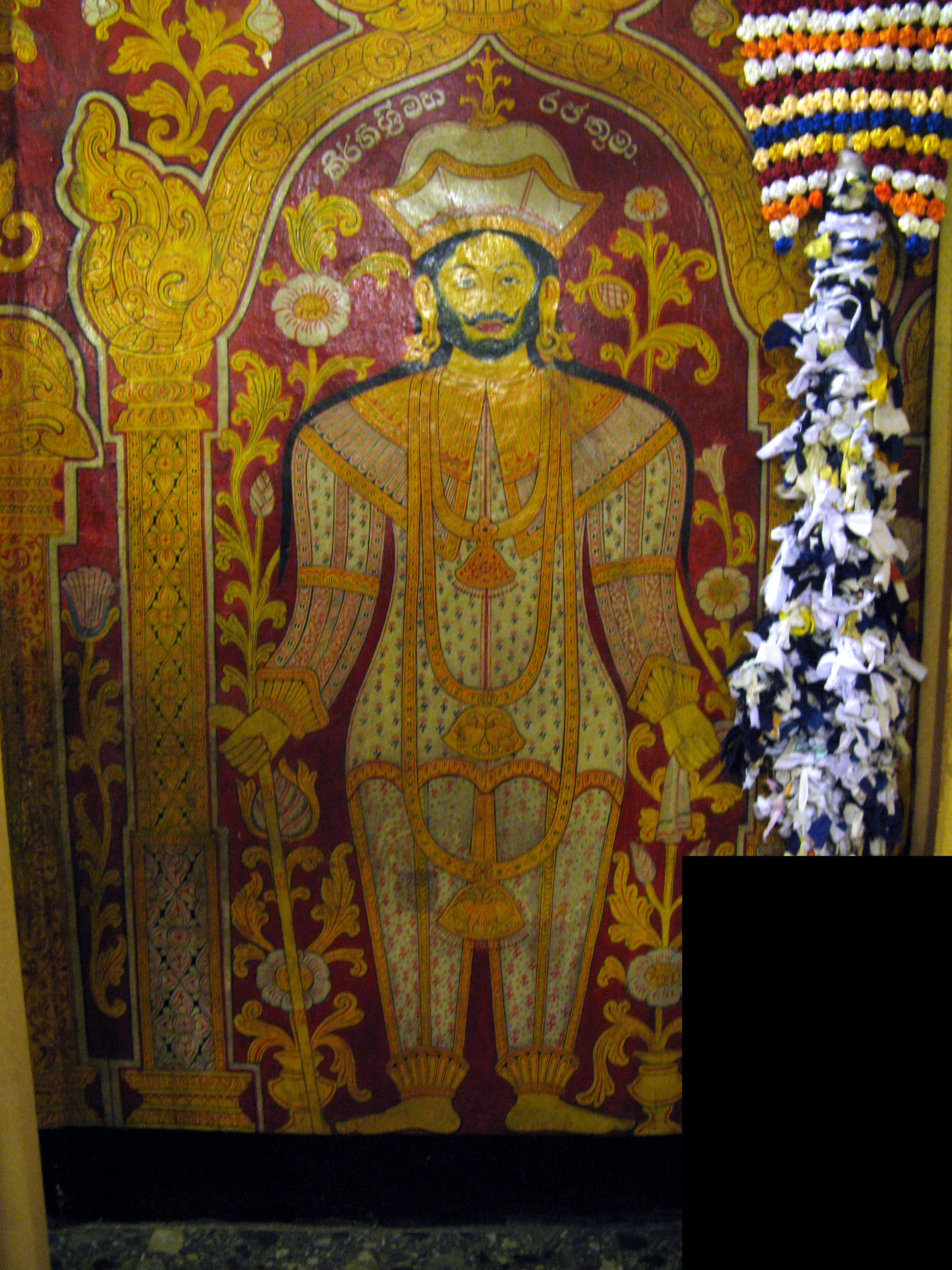

=== Dance ===
Kandyan art is renowned for its intricate beauty, and Kandyan dancing is a prominent example. Characterized by graceful, flowing movements and vibrant, elaborate costumes, this traditional dance form holds deep cultural significance. Often performed at religious festivals, cultural celebrations, and special ceremonies, Kandyan dancing remains an important expression of Sri Lanka's artistic heritage and a vital part of the island's living tradition.

=== Jewellery ===
Another important Kandyan art form is jewelry-making, renowned for its intricate craftsmanship. Skilled artisans create detailed designs using precious stones and metals, producing pieces of remarkable beauty. In the royal court, such Kandyan jewelry was worn as a symbol of wealth, prestige, and status, reflecting both artistic mastery and cultural identity.

== See also ==
- History of Sri Lanka
- Kastane
- Stranger King

== Bibliography ==
Books

- Dewaraja, Lorna Srimathie (1988). The Kandyan Kingdom of Sri Lanka, 1707-1782. Kandy: Lake House Investments. ISBN 978-955-552-018-8.

Theses

- Kulasekera, Kulasekera Mudiyanselage Padmasiri (1984). British Administration in the Kandyan Provinces of Sri Lanka, 1815-1833, With Special Reference to Social Change (PhD Thesis).
- Somaratna, Gintota Parana Vidanage (1969). Political history of the Kingdom of Kotte (c. A.D. 1400-1521) (PhD Thesis). SOAS University of London.
