= Temple of the Tooth =

Temple complex in Kandy, Sri Lanka

Temple of the Sacred Tooth Relic
- ශ්‍රී දළදා මාළිගාව; தலதா மாளிகை
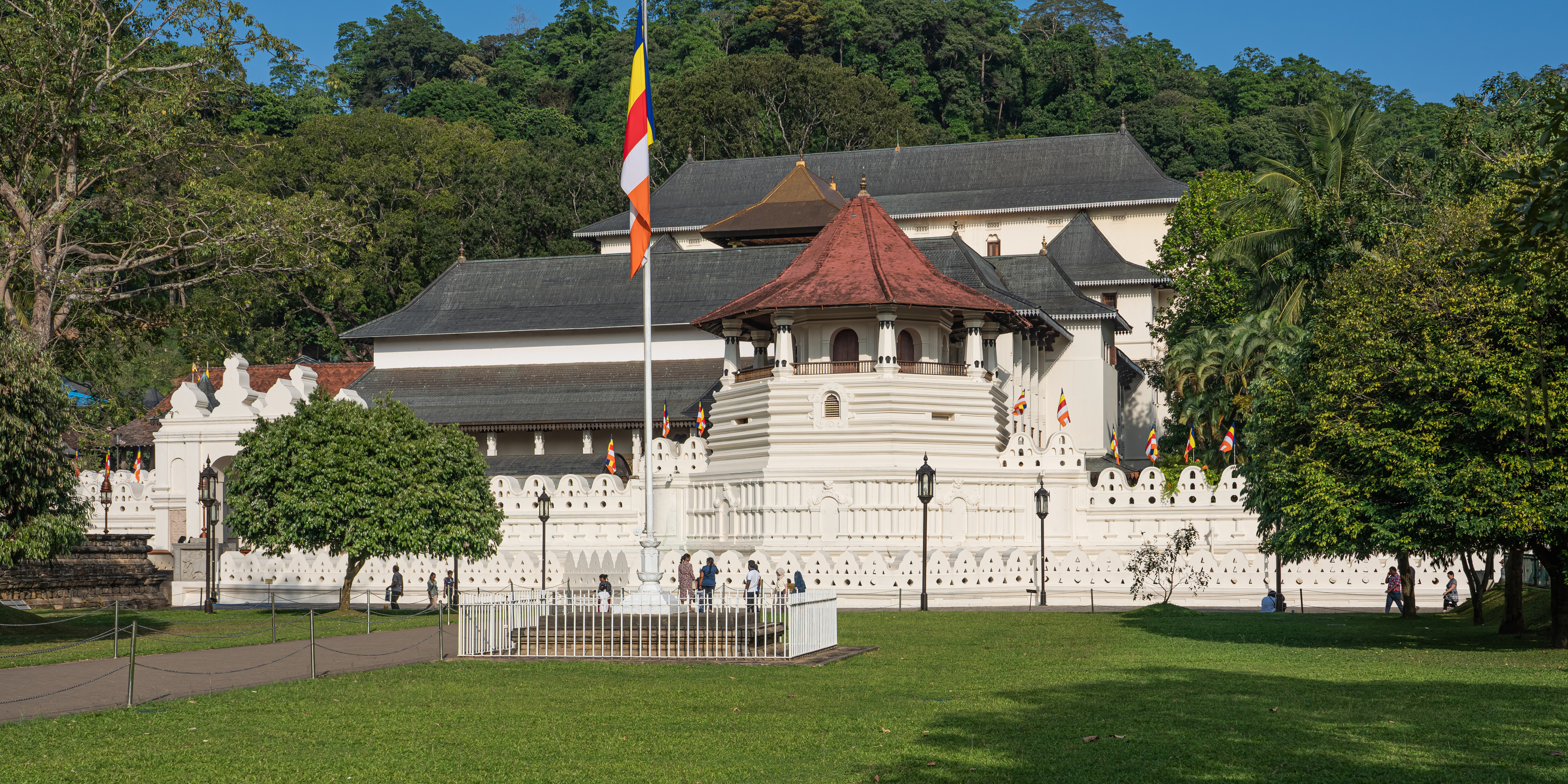
- Temple of the Sacred Tooth Relic, a World Heritage Site in Kandy

- Location within Sri Lanka

Religion
- Affiliation: Buddhism

Location
- Location: Kandy
- Country: Sri Lanka
- Interactive map of Temple of the Sacred Tooth Relic
- Coordinates: 7°17′37″N 80°38′29″E

Architecture
- Founder: Vimaladharmasuriya I of Kandy
- Completed: 1595
- UNESCO World Heritage Site
- Type: Cultural
- Criteria: (iv)(vi)
- Designated: 1988
- Reference no.: 450
- Archaeological Protected Monument of Sri Lanka

Website
- Sri Dalada Maligawa

Sri Dalada Maligawa, (Note: ශ්‍රී දළදා මාළිගාව ṣrī daladā māligāva) commonly known in English as the Temple of the Sacred Tooth Relic, is a Buddhist temple in Kandy, Sri Lanka. It is located in the Royal Palace Complex of the former Kingdom of Kandy, which houses the relic of the tooth of the Buddha. Since ancient times, the relic has played an important role in local politics because it is believed that whoever holds the relic holds the governance of the country. The relic was historically held by Sinhalese kings. The Temple of the Tooth is a World Heritage Site mainly due to the temple and the relic.

Bhikkhus of two particular chapters, the Malwathu chapter and the Asgiri chapter, conduct daily worship in the inner chamber of the temple. Rituals are performed three times daily: at dawn, at noon and in the evenings. On Wednesdays, there is a symbolic bathing of the relic with a herbal preparation made from scented water and fragrant flowers called Nanumura Mangallaya; this holy water is believed to contain healing powers and is distributed among those present. The Kandy Esala Perahera is conducted annually to pay homage to the Sacred Tooth Relic.

== History ==
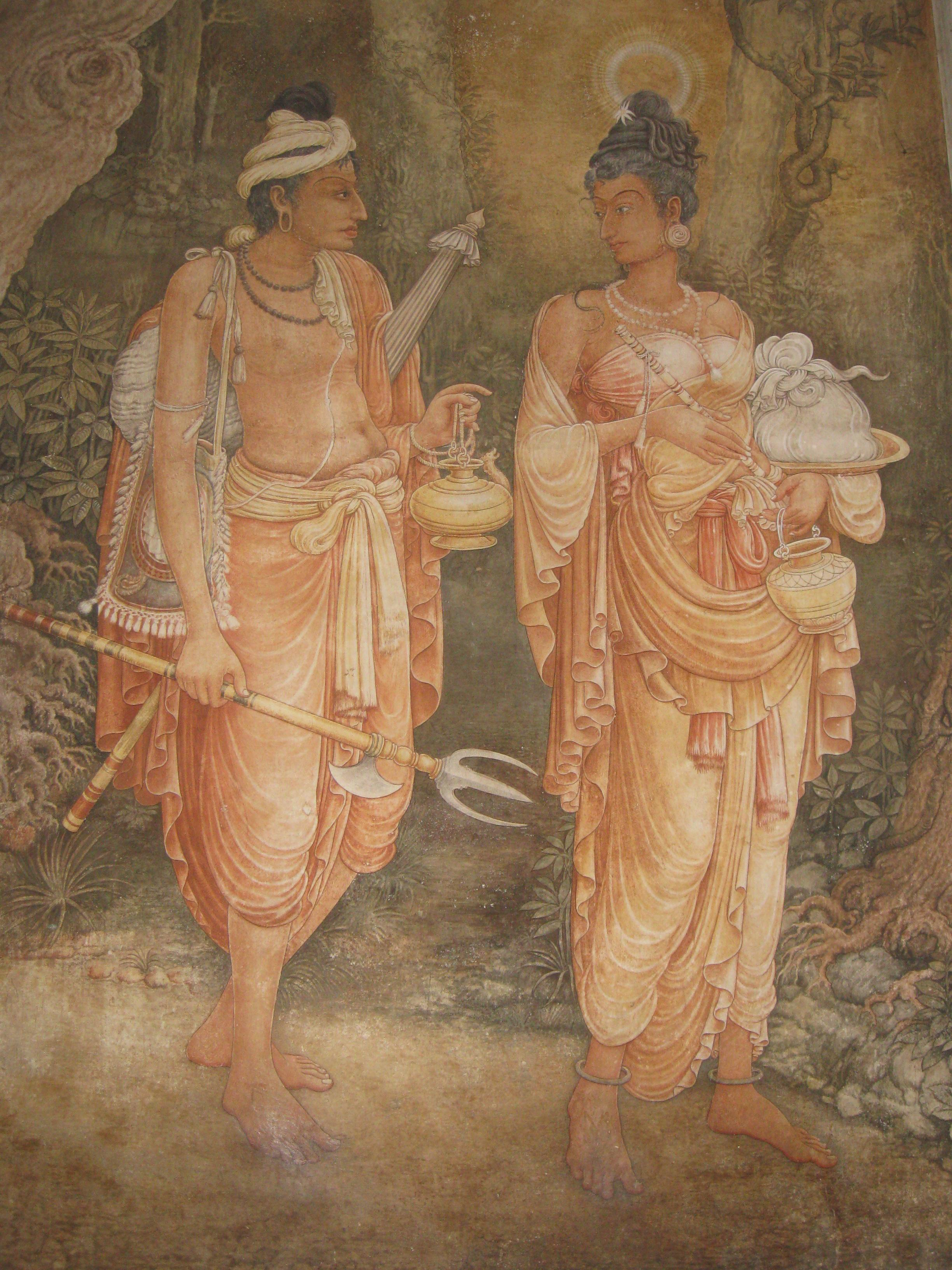
Wall painting at Kelaniya Temple of Princess Hemamali and Prince Dantha as she carried Gautama Buddha's tooth relic hidden in her hair to Sri Lanka. – Painting by Solias Mendis

After the Maha parinirvana of Gautama Buddha, according to the legend, the tooth relic was preserved in Kalinga. When kingdom Kalinga was attacked, brought to the island by Princess Hemamali and her brother, Prince Dantha on the instructions of their father King Guhasiva. Hemmamali hid the relic in her hair on the way to the island. They landed on the island in Lankapattana during the reign of Sirimeghavanna of Anuradhapura (301–328) and handed over the tooth relic. The king enshrined it in Meghagiri Vihara (present day Isurumuniya) in Anuradhapura. Safeguarding the relic was the responsibility of the monarch from then, therefore over the years, the custodianship of the relic came to symbolize the right to rule the island. Therefore, reigning monarchs built the tooth relic temples quite close to their royal residences, as was the case during the times of the Anuradhapura Kingdom, Kingdom of Polonnaruwa, and Kingdom of Dambadeniya. During the era of the Kingdom of Gampola, the relic was housed in Niyamgampaya Vihara. It is reported in the messenger poems such as Hamsa, Gira, and Selalihini that the temple of tooth relic was situated within the city of Sri Jayawardenepura Kotte when the Kingdom of Kotte was established there.

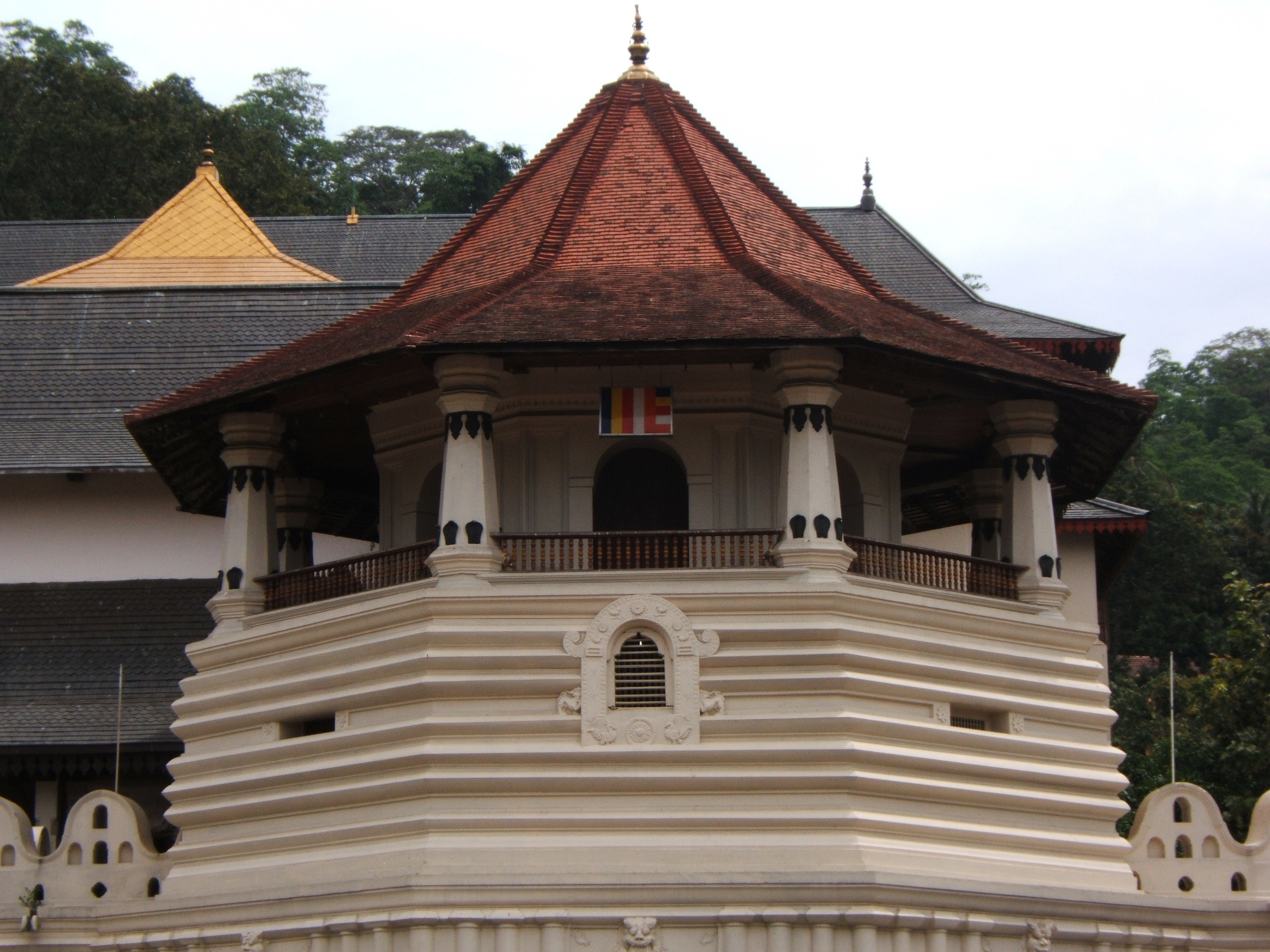
The Paththirippuwa, as seen from the front

During the reign of Dharmapala of Kotte, the relic was moved and was hidden in Delgamuwa Vihara, Ratnapura, in a grinding stone. It was brought to Kandy by Hiripitiye Diyawadana Rala and Devanagala Rathnalankara Thera. King Vimaladharmasuriya I built a two-storey building to deposit the tooth relic and the building is now gone. In 1603 when the Portuguese kingdom invaded Kandy, it was carried to Meda Mahanuwara in Dumbara. It was recovered in the time of Rajasinha II and it has been reported that he reinstated the original building or built a new temple. The present-day temple of the tooth was built by Vira Narendra Sinha. The octagonal Paththirippuwa and moat were added during the reign of Sri Vikrama Rajasinha. The royal architect Devendra Moolacharya is credited with building the Paththirippuwa. Originally it was used by the king for recreational activities and later it was offered to the tooth relic, it now houses the temple's library.

=== Attacks on the building ===
The temple was attacked in 1989 by the militant organisation Janatha Vimukthi Peramuna (JVP) with the intention of capturing the relic. The militant organisation Liberation Tigers of Tamil Eelam (LTTE) attacked the complex in 1998, damaging the front side of the royal palace.

=== Overcrowding deaths and injuries ===
In April 2025, the Temple of the Tooth held a public exposition of the tooth relic that drew approximately 450,000 devotees in a single day with queues stretching nearly 10 km (6.2 mi). Severe overcrowding and fatigue (not because of pushing or pressing) resulted in four deaths and more than 300 hospitalisations, primarily due to heat exhaustion. Authorities suspended additional train services to the city, deployed police commandos for crowd control, and restricted entry to the temple complex.

== Architecture ==
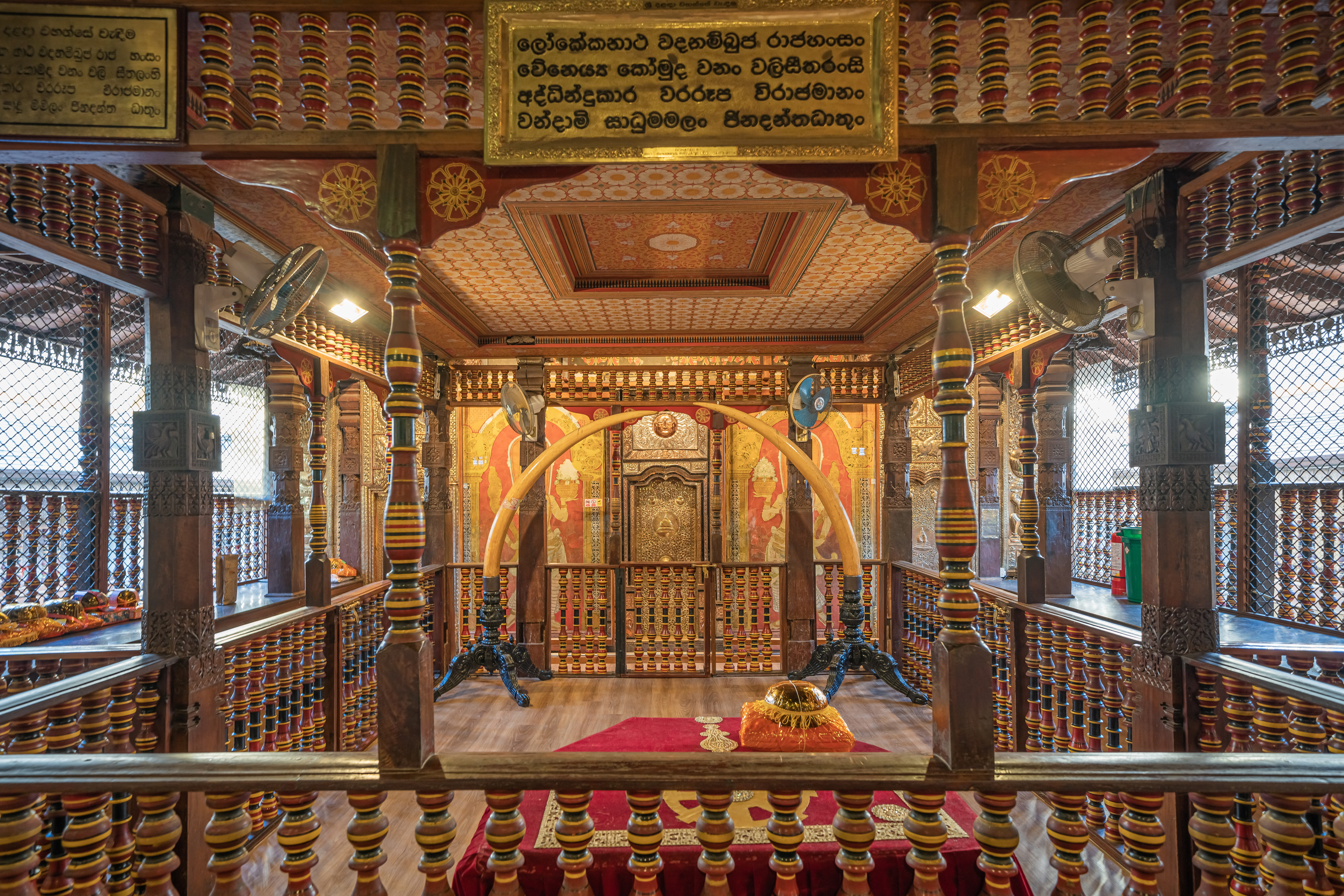
Inside the Temple of the Tooth

The brick wall which runs along the moat and the Bogambara lake is known as the water waves wall. Holes in this wall are built to light coconut oil lamps. The main entrance gate which lies over the moat is called Mahawahalkada. At the foot of the Mahawahalkada steps, there is a Sandakada pahana (moonstone) which is carved in Kandyan architectural style. Mahawahalkada was totally destroyed in a 1998 bomb blast and rebuilt afterwards along with Sandakada pahana other stone carvings. Elephants are depicted in stone on either side of the entrance. A Makara Torana and two guardian stones are placed on top of the staircase. TheHewisi drummers' chamber is situated in front of the main shrine. The two storeys of the main shrine are known as "Palle Malaya" (lower floor) and "Udu Malaya" (upper floor) or "Weda hitina maligawa". The doors of the Weda Hitana Maligawa are Ivory carvings. The actual chamber in which the tooth relic is kept is known as the "Handun kunama".

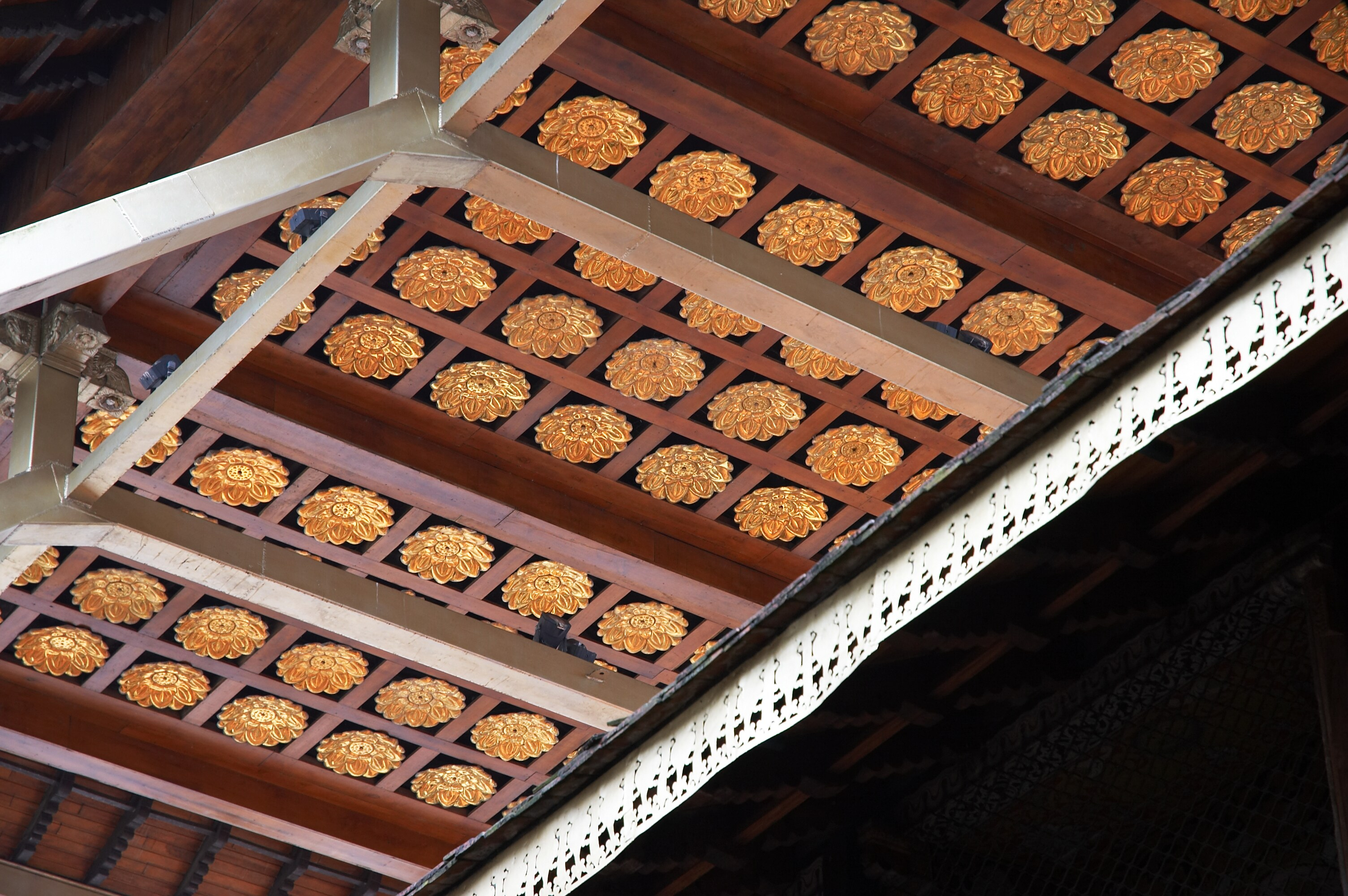
The golden canopy over the main shrine

The golden canopy over the main shrine and the golden fence which encircles the temple complex, was built in 1987 by then Prime Minister, Ranasinghe Premadasa. The tooth relic is encased in seven golden caskets which are inlaid with precious gemstones. The casket represent a stupa; the procession casket which is used during the Kandy Esala Perahera is also displayed in the same chamber.

== Associated buildings and structures ==
=== Royal Palace ===
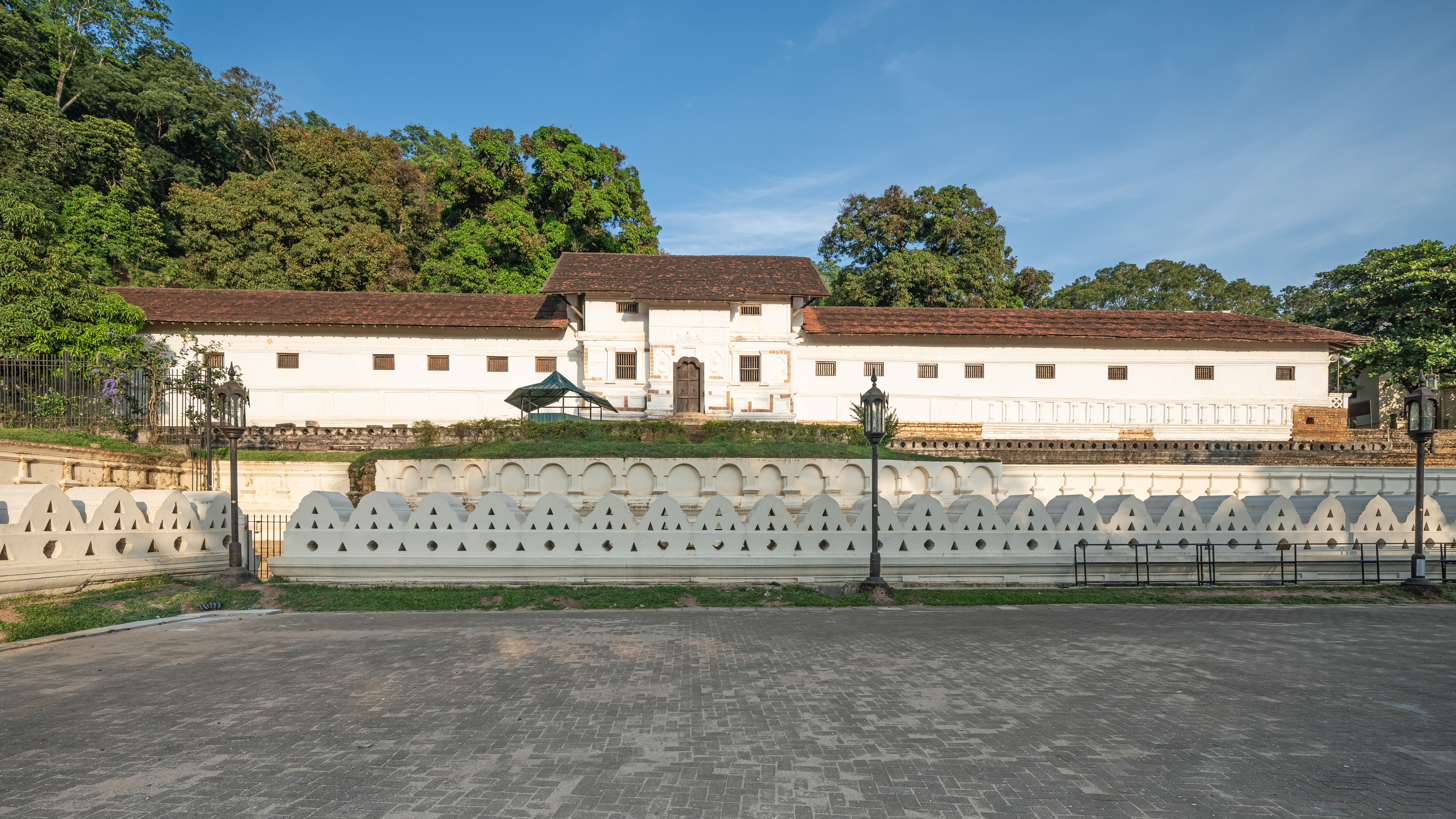
Vimaladharmasuriya I of Kandy built the Royal Palace of Kandy

The royal palace is situated to the north of the temple. John Pybus, who was on an embassy in 1762, gives a detailed description of the royal palace. Vikramabahu III of Gampola (r. 1356–1374) and Sena Sammatha Wickramabahu of Kandy (r. 1469–1511) built royal palaces on this site. Vimaladharmasuriya I of Kandy undertook various decorations to the palace. The Dutch orientalist Philippus Baldaeus visited the palace with General Gerard Pietersz Hulft in 1656. The royal residence was known as "Maha Wasala" in Sinhalese starting in the Polonnaruwa period. The royal palace is also known as "Maligawa" (Note: මාලිගාව, māḷigāva) (Palace). There were three Wahalkadas and an 8 feet (2.4 m) high wall used as main entrances. The section of the palace facing the Natha Devale is said to be the oldest. During the beginning of the British period, it was used by the government agent Sir John D'Oyly, 1st Baronet, of Kandy. Successors of D'Oyly have continued to use it as their official residence. Today it is preserved as an archaeological museum. Ulpen Ge and Queens Palace are the associated buildings of the palace.

=== Audience hall ===
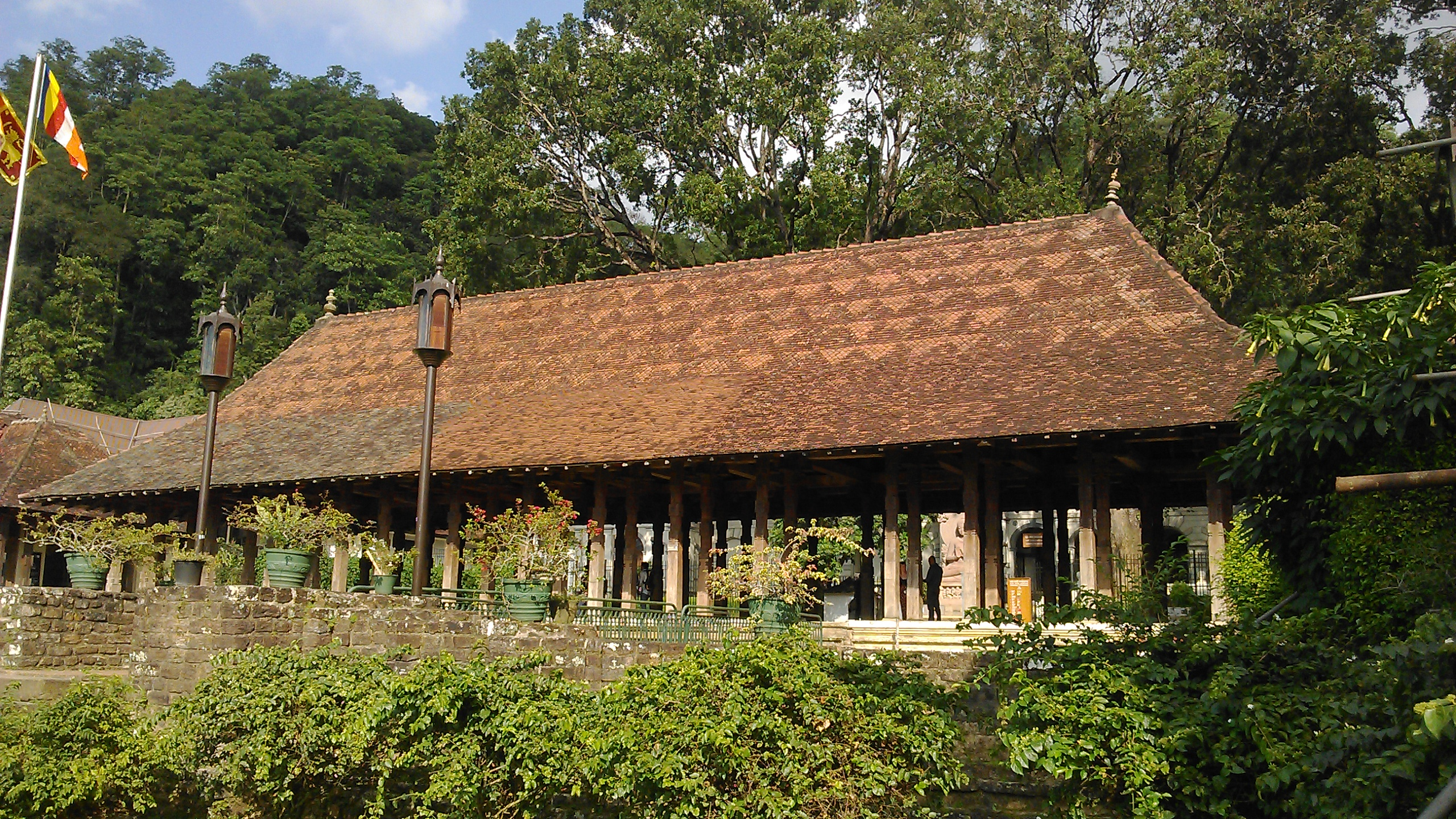
Audience hall seen here from the northern façade of the temple

The audience hall or magul maduwa is where the Kandyan kings held their court. It was completed during the reign of Sri Vikrama Rajasinha. The carvings of the wooden pillars which support the wooden roof are an example of wood carving of the Kandyan period. Sri Rajadhi Rajasinha of Kandy built it in 1783. The hall was renovated for the reception of the arrival of Albert Edward, Prince of Wales in 1872. Originally the hall was 58 by 35.6 feet (17.7 m × 10.9 m); after renovation, its length was extended by an additional 31.6 feet (9.6 m). Other nearby buildings to the halls are believed to have been demolished during the British rule. The audience hall was the venue where the Kandyan Convention was drawn up, it was where the convention was read out to the people and where the conference, about the convention, was held on 2 March 1815. That space was later used to erect the Kandy Kachcheri and Kandy Supreme Court. Today it is used for state ceremonies and conserved under the Department of Archaeology.

=== Mahamaluwa ===
Mahamaluwa is public who came to see the annual Esala perahera. Today it contains a statue of Madduma Bandara. The memorial which contains the skull of Keppetipola Disawe is another attraction. The statues of Princess Hemamali and Prince Dantha are also located here.

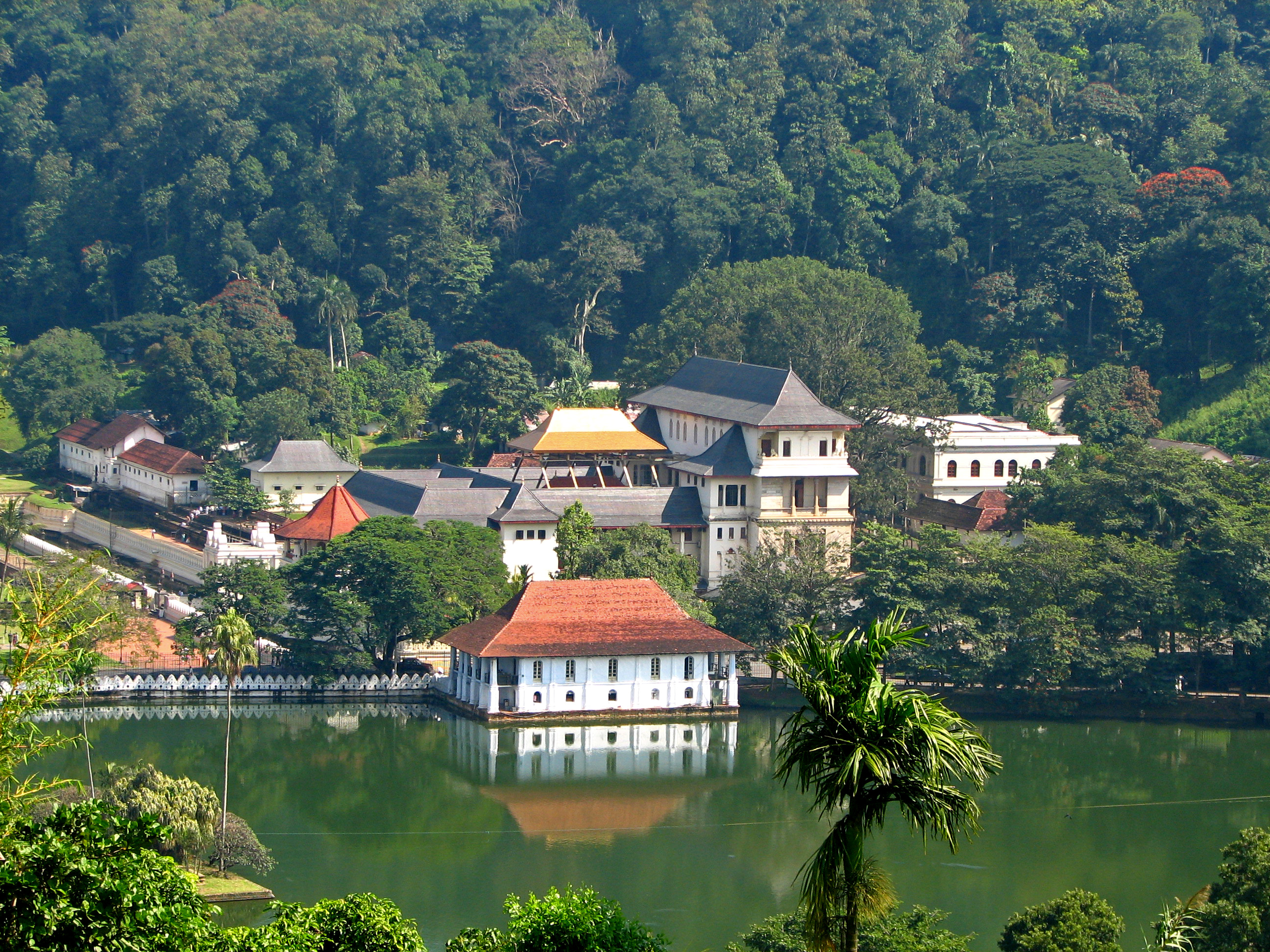

1	Temple of the Tooth building complex
2	Mahawahalkada (Main entrance)
3	Moat
4	Paththirippuwa (Octagon)
5	Handun Kudama
6	Golden Canopy
7	Temple of the Tooth Museum (New palace)

8	Royal Palace of Kandy
9	National Museum of Kandy
10	International Buddhist Museum (Old courts building)
11	Kandy Lake
12	Ulpange (Queens Bathing Pavilion)
13	Jayatilleke Mandapaya
14	Udawatta Kele Sanctuary

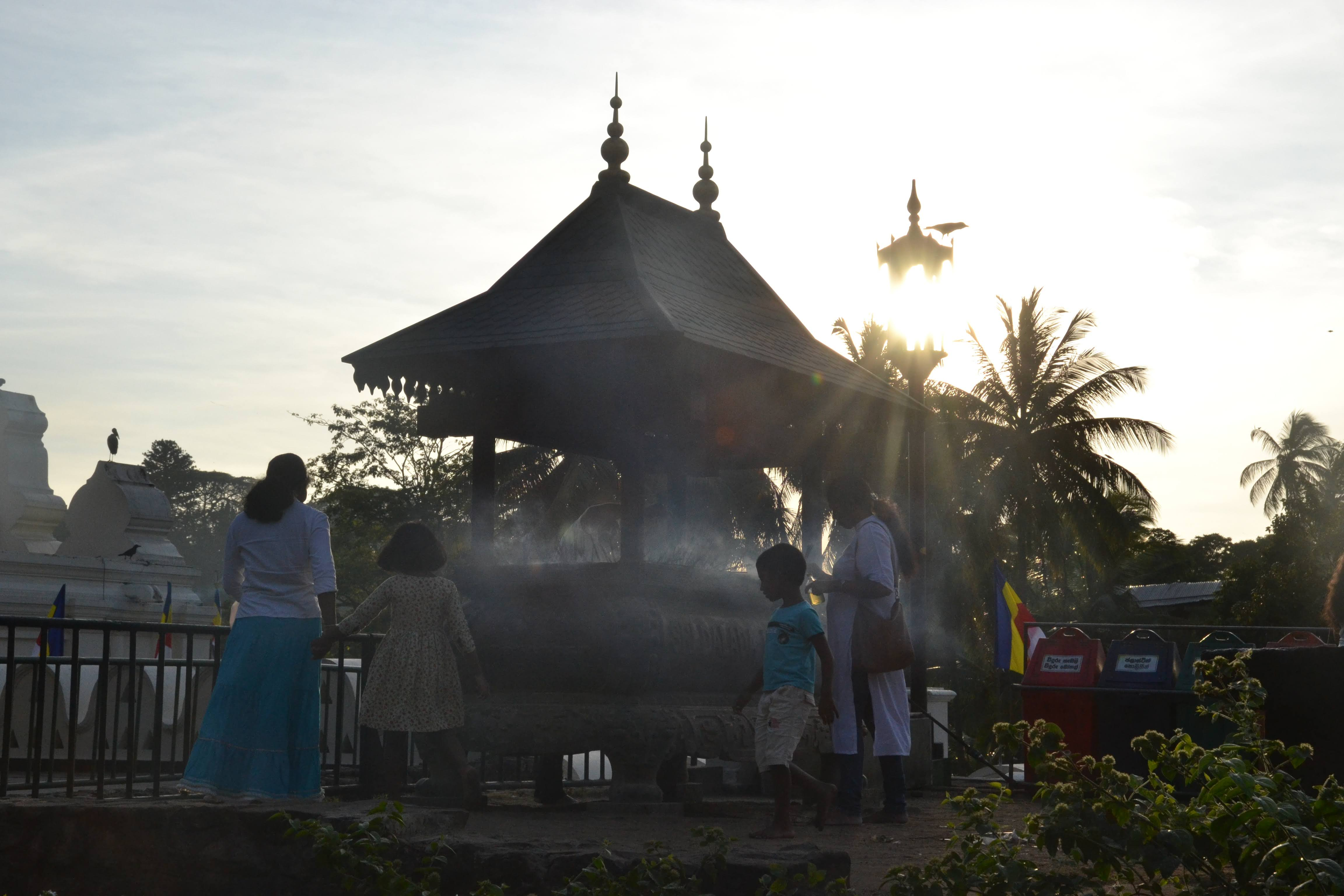
Offerings, Temple of the Tooth, Kandy

== See also ==
- Buddha Tooth Relic Temple and Museum
- Cetiya
- Constantino of Braganza
- Dāṭhavaṃsa
- Diyawadana Nilame (chief lay custodian)
- Gaspar Jorge de Leão Pereira
- Relics in Sri Lanka associated with Buddha

== Sources ==
- Abeywardena, H.A.P. (2004). Kandurata Praveniya (in Sinhala) (1st ed.). Colombo: Central Bank of Sri Lanka. ISBN 9789555750929.
- Seneviratna, Anuradha (1989). "Dalada Maligawa". In Vethara Mahinda Thera (ed.). Kanda Udarata Mahanuwara (in Sinhala) (Sinhala translation ed.). Colombo: Ministry of Cultural affairs (Sri Lanka).
- Siriweera, W. I. (2004). History of Sri Lanka. Colombo: Dayawansa Jayakodi & Company. ISBN 955-551-257-4.
- Wijesooriya, S. (2006). A Concise Sinhala Mahavamsa. Kotte: Participatory Development Forum. ISBN 955-9140-31-0.
- Brockman, Nobert (2011). Encyclopedia of Sacred Places, Volume 1. ISBN 978-1598846546.
- McDaniel, Thomas (2018). Architects of Buddhist Leisure. University of Hawaii. ISBN 978-0824876753.
- Maduggalle, Sunil J. Raja, the Sri Dalada Maligawa Tusker.

=== Journals ===
- Lahiri, Latika (1974). "Ceylon and China: The Account of Ceylon in the Dynastic History of the T'ang Period". Proceedings of the Indian History Congress. 35: 388–391. JSTOR 44138805.
