= Golden Canopy of the Temple of the Tooth =

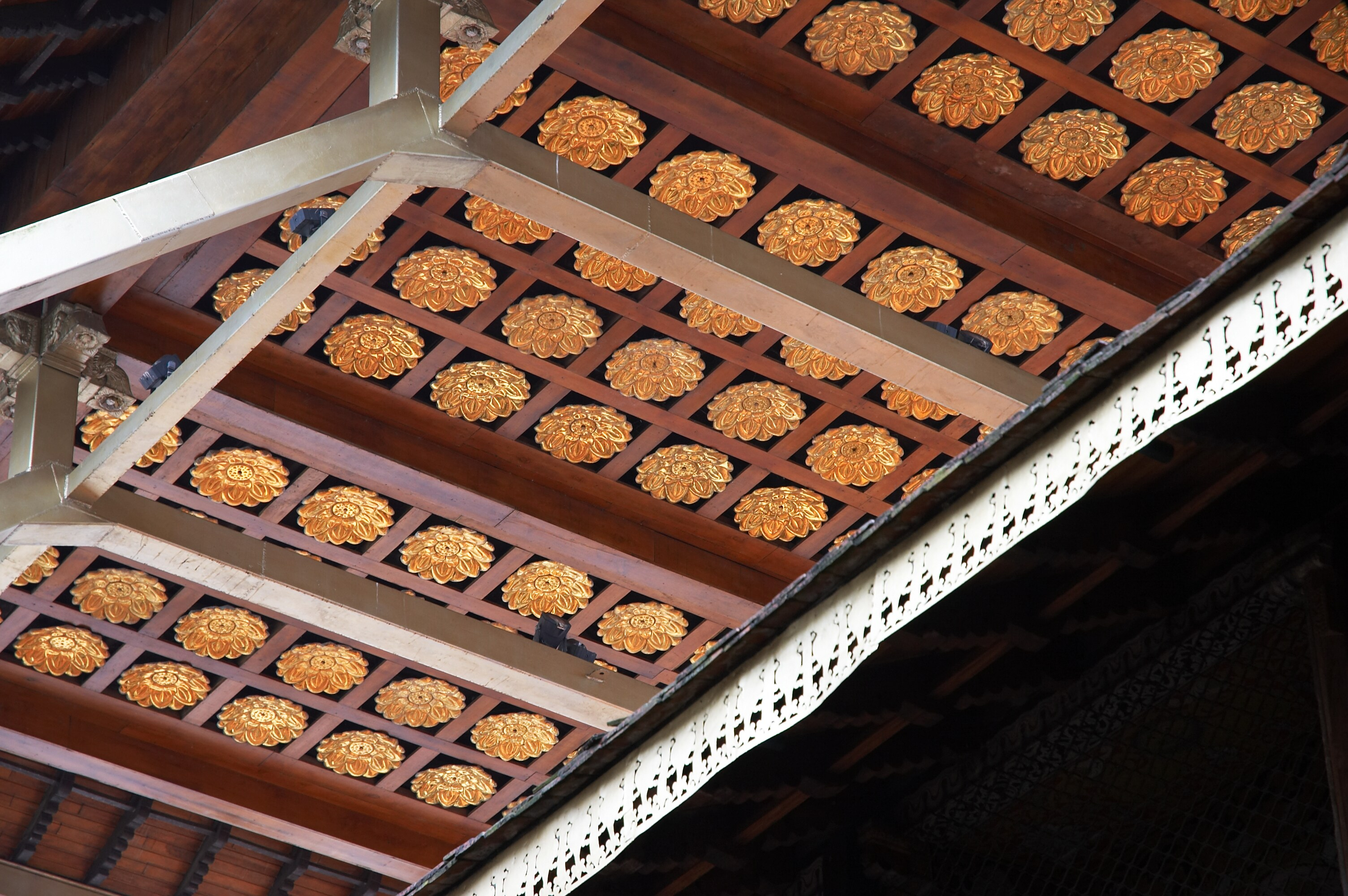

General information
- Type: Canopy
- Location: Sri Dalada Maligawa, Kandy, Sri Lanka
- Construction started: June 1987
- Completed: December 1987
- Opened: 31 December 1987
- Renovated: 2002
- Cost: Rs 20M

The Golden Canopy of the Temple of the Tooth (Sinhala: දළදා මාළිගාවේ රන් වියන, romanized: Dalada Maligawe Ran Viyana, lit. 'Golden Canopy of Dalada Maligawa') is a canopy used to cover the Relic of the tooth of the Buddha, housed in the Sri Dalada Maligawa (Temple of the Tooth) in Kandy Sri Lanka.

In 1986 the Prime Minister Ranasinghe Premadasa made an official visit to the temple to pay homage to the sacred tooth relic. During this visit, the chief monks complained about water leaking from the roof and Premadasa pledged to cover the roof with a bronze sheet. Six months later, Premadasa formally announced plans to build a golden canopy over the inner shrine room of the temple. There were a number of objectors to the proposal including the Director of the Sri Lankan Department of Archeology, Roland Silva, arguing that a canopy over the existing roof would risk the structural integrity of the building and the temple's heritage value, given that there had been no additions made to the building since the last King of Kandy, Sri Vikrama Rajasinha, had occupied the throne. On 31 December 1987 the golden canopy, which cost more than Rs 20M, was officially unveiled by Premadasa. The gold plated tiles on the canopy were imported from Japan and installed upon a steel frame. As the use of concrete was not practical due to the limited timeframe for construction a steel frame was erected however this resulted in the canopy being subject to swaying so further steel supports were installed, projecting from the upper level of the Dalada Museum, directly behind the Palle Mahala (Tevava Chamber).

Political commentators at the time attribute Premadasa's decision to erected the golden canopy as being a significant factor in his subsequent election to the country's presidency in January 1988. The canopy over the country's most sacred relic symbolising and reinforcing the public view of his commitment that the country should remain a Sinhalese Buddhist nation.

In 2002 the canopy sheets were refurbished using 4,000 gold plated ceramic tiles produced in Sri Lanka.

In 2017 Prime Minister Ranil Wickramasinghe publicly promised that the canopy will be renovated. A week after, President Maithripala Sirisena gave Rs. 45 million for gold plating the golden canopy.
