= Kandy Lake =

- Kiri Muhuda
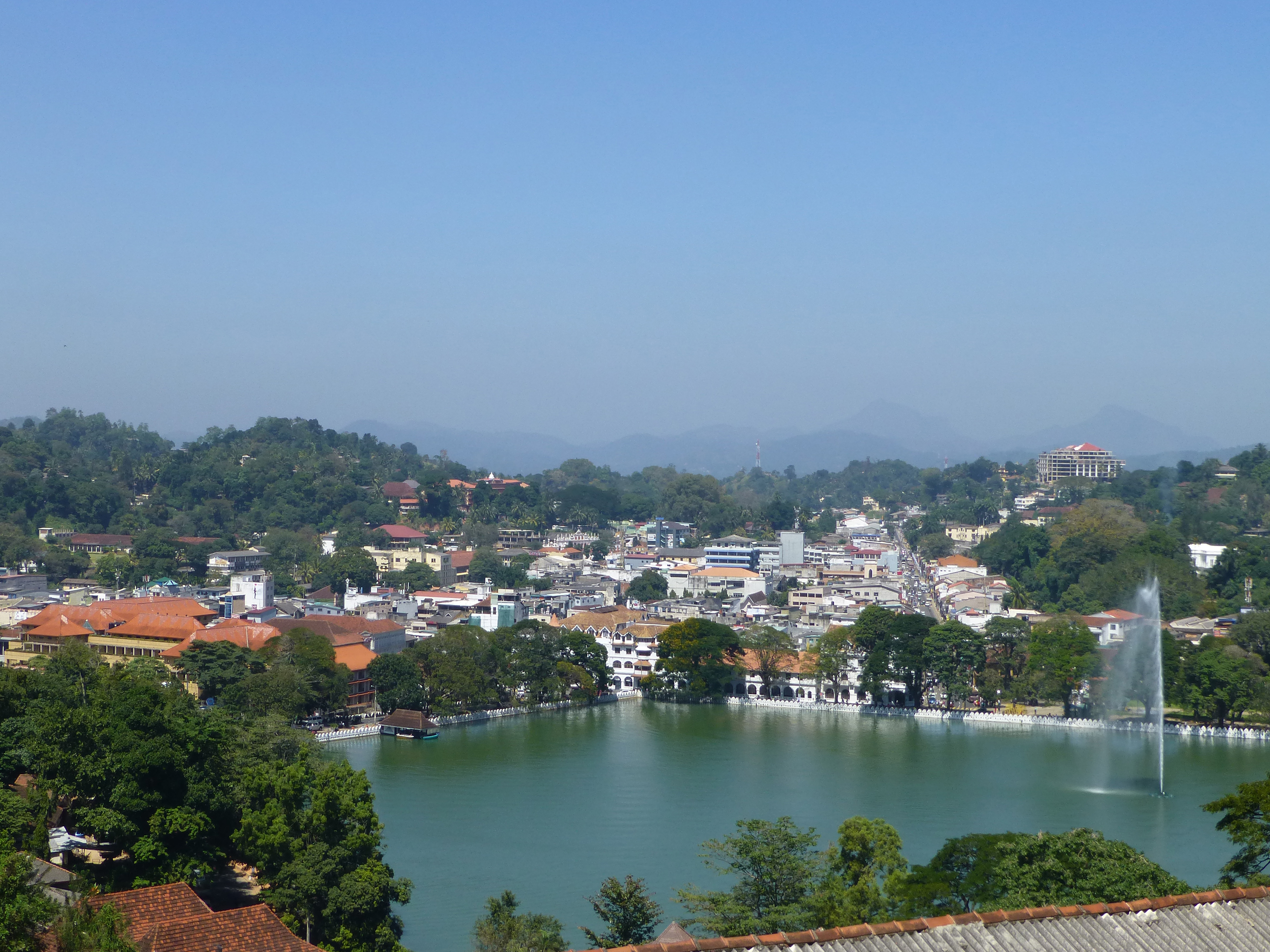
- Kandy Lake

- Location within Sri Lanka
- Location: Kandy
- Coordinates: 7°18′N 80°38′E
- Type: reservoir
- Primary inflows: Creek from Ampitiya
- Primary outflows: Creek leading to Mahaweli River
- Basin countries: Sri Lanka
- Built: 1807–1812
- Surface area: 19.01 ha (47.0 acres)
- Max. depth: 18 m (59 ft)
- Water volume: 867×10^{3} m^{3} (30.6×10^{6} cu ft)
- Shore length^{1}: 3.4 km (2.1 mi)
- Surface elevation: 529 m (1,736 ft)
- Islands: one
- ^{1} Shore length is not a well-defined measure.

Kandy Lake (Sinhala: නුවර වැව), also known as Kiri Muhuda or the Sea of Milk, is an artificial lake in the heart of the hill city of Kandy, Sri Lanka, was built in 1807 by King Sri Wickrama Rajasinghe next to the Temple of the Tooth. It is a protected lake, with all fishing prohibited.

== History ==
The lake in front of the Temple of the Tooth was formerly a stretch of paddy fields known as Tigolwela. It was converted to a lake by King Sri Wickrama Rajasinha in 1807. As there had been a pond named Kiri-muhuda (a "sea of milk") in the middle of the Tigolwela, the lake constructed subsequently too was named Kiri-muhuda. Deveda Moolacharya is considered the architect of the Kandy Lake. The king first built a dam across the paddy fields, starting from the Paththirippuwa (octagon) side, where the steps leading into the lake by the Mahamaluwa (Esplanade) are still visible, stretching across to the Poya-maluwa. The dam, upon which a roadway was constructed, allowed the king to go across to the Malwatte Vihare. According to D’Oyley, the dam was constructed between 1810 and 1812.

There are numerous local legends and folklore regarding the lake. One such is that the small island at its centre was used by the king's harem for bathing and was connected to the palace by a secret tunnel.

== Description ==
The extent of Kandy Lake is 6,544 m^{2} (70,440 sq ft). The circumference is 3.21 km (1.99 mi). The greatest depth is 18.5 m (61 ft). The parapet wall, giving the appearance of a cloud, is popularly called Walakulu Bemma and measures 633.82 m (2,079.5 ft). The building located at the centre of the lake, together with some ancient ruins, was known as Diyatilaka Mandapaya in the past. It is believed that the Kings used this pavilion for relaxation.

The Kandy Lake offers a place for a stroll or a jog. The shady path surrounding the lake provides a view of the hills and the town. The Malwatte temple, one of the two head temples of the Siyam Nikaya sect of Theravada Buddhism, is also located overlooking the lake.

=== Diyathilaka Mandapaya ===
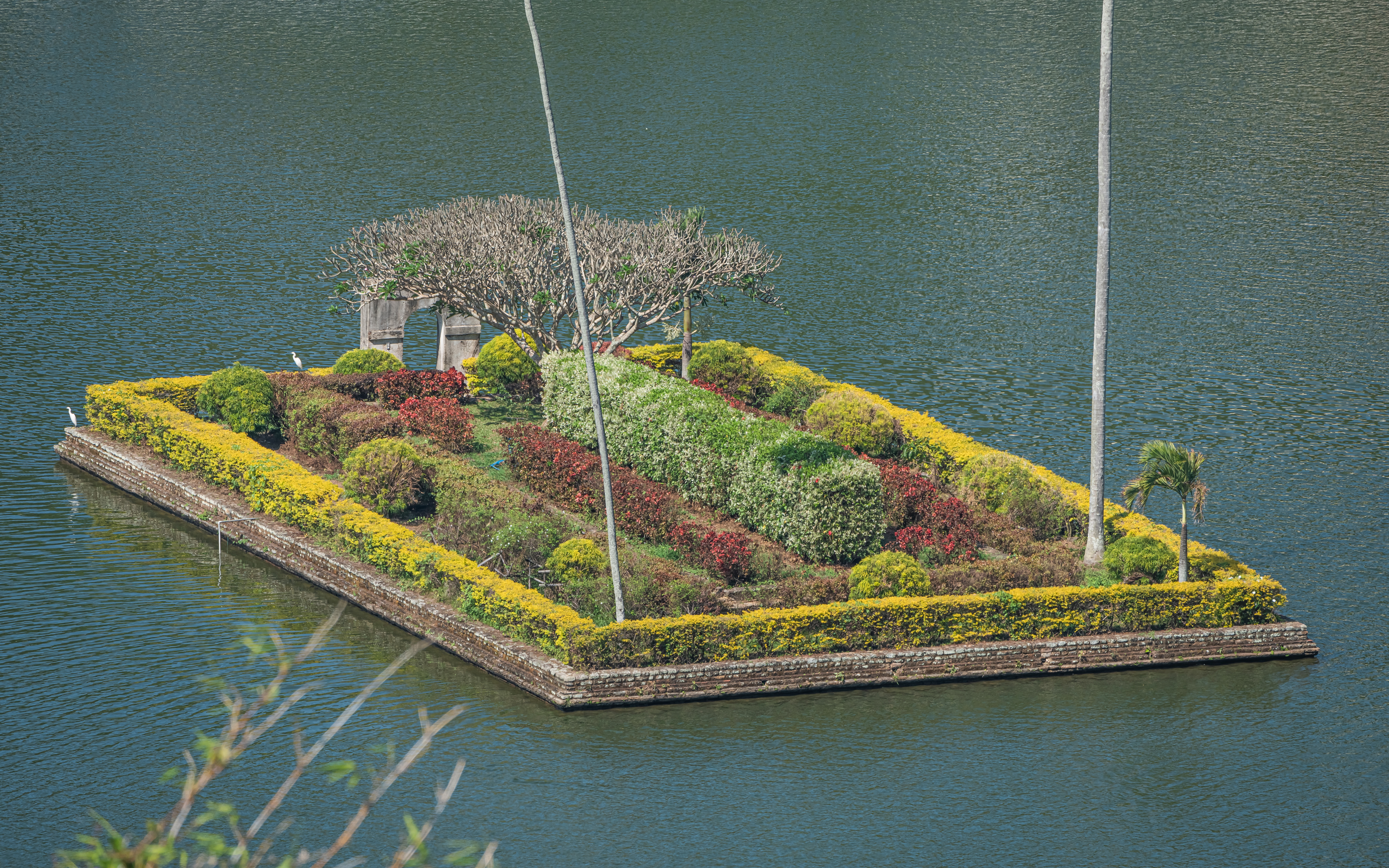
Diyathilaka Mandapaya

Sri Wickrama Rajasinghe built a dam for the purpose of reaching the opposite side of the lake. The king removed the soil from both the palace end and the Malwatte Vihare end, leaving an island behind. At first, this island was used as the Royal Summer House for the Queen and the ladies of the court to relax. The British later used it as an ammunition store and added a fortress-style parapet around its perimeter.

=== Walakula Bamma ===
The lake is surrounded by a wall called Walakulu Bamma (Sinhala: වළාකුළු බැම්ම) or Clouds Wall, which was built to increase the beauty of the Kandy Lake. It extends around half of the lake and took one skilled architect to build it. Sri Wickrama Rajasinghe was unable to complete the wall before the city was captured by the British and he was forced to relinquish the Kandian kingdom. The Walakulu Bamma still lies unfinished. The triangular-shaped holes in the wall were used in the past for lighting oil lamps on festival days.

=== Ulpange ===
Ulpange or Queens Bathing Pavilion is situated partly in the waters of the Kandy Lake. The wives and concubines of Sri Wickrama Rajasinghe used the pavilion when bathing in the lake. After the British captured the city they added another storey and used the building as a library. It is currently used as a police post.

== Facts about the lake ==
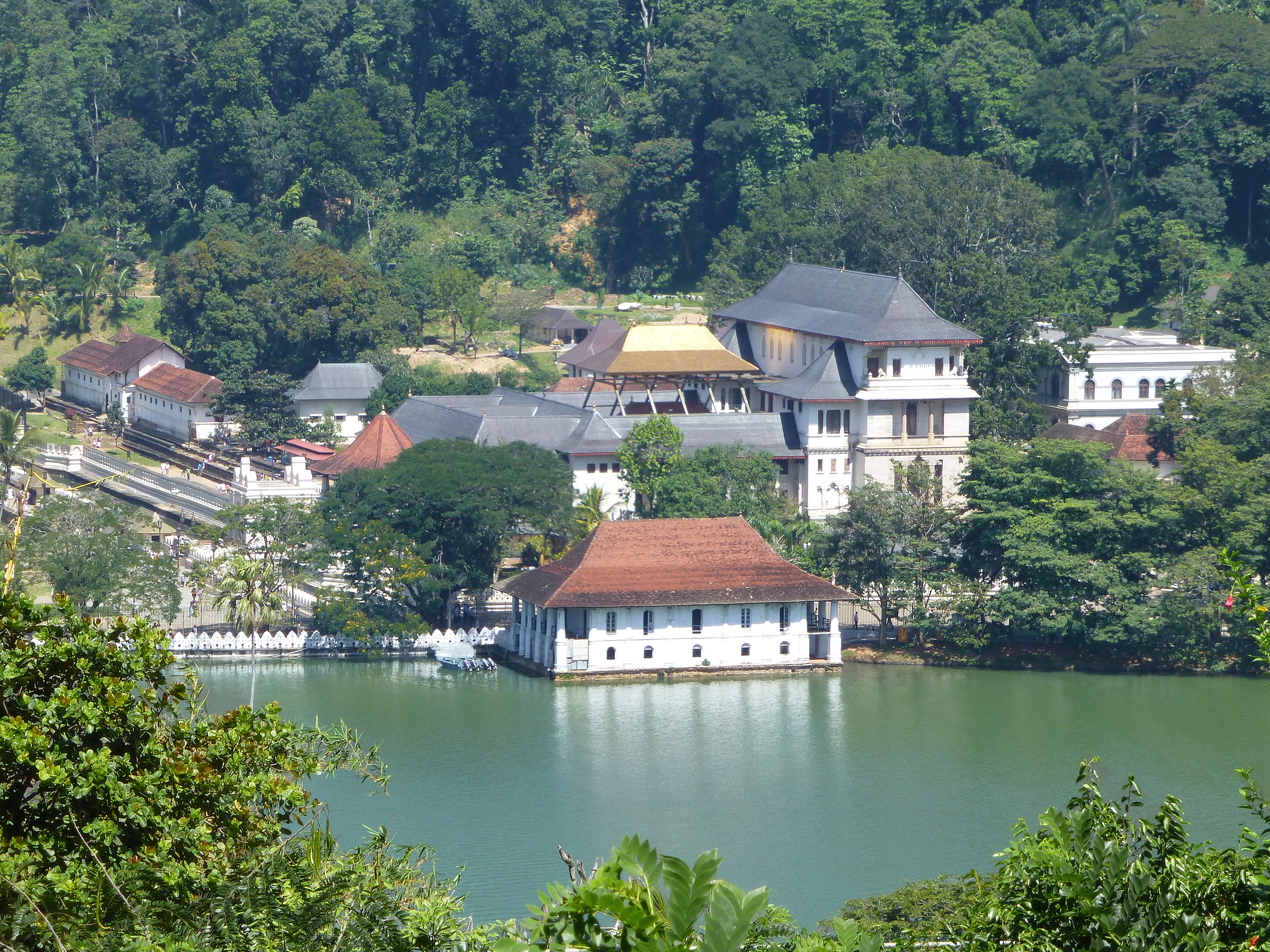
Queen's bath

- Spill level above: 1740 M.L.S
- Capacity: 704 acre-feet
- Perimeter of the tank: 3.4 kilometres (2.1 mi)
- Maximum depth: 18 metres (59 ft)
- Length of the decorative wall: 630 metres (2,070 ft)
- Catchment area: 1.045 Q.M.I

A variety of different trees are planted around the lake, including Nuga, palm, fruit, Sal and Mara trees. Some of the trees are about 74 years old. The trees are now maintained by the Municipal Council of Kandy. There are a number of bird species found on the lake, including Indian cormorant, white egret crane, wood stork and pelican.

== Pollution ==
Pollution of the lake is a serious problem. The government and the surrounding schools are trying to decrease the problem by putting up signs and operating environmental societies. Until 1960 the Kandy water board used the lake to distribute water to the surrounding areas. They stopped pumping water from the lake because of the increase in pollution.
