= Paththirippuwa =

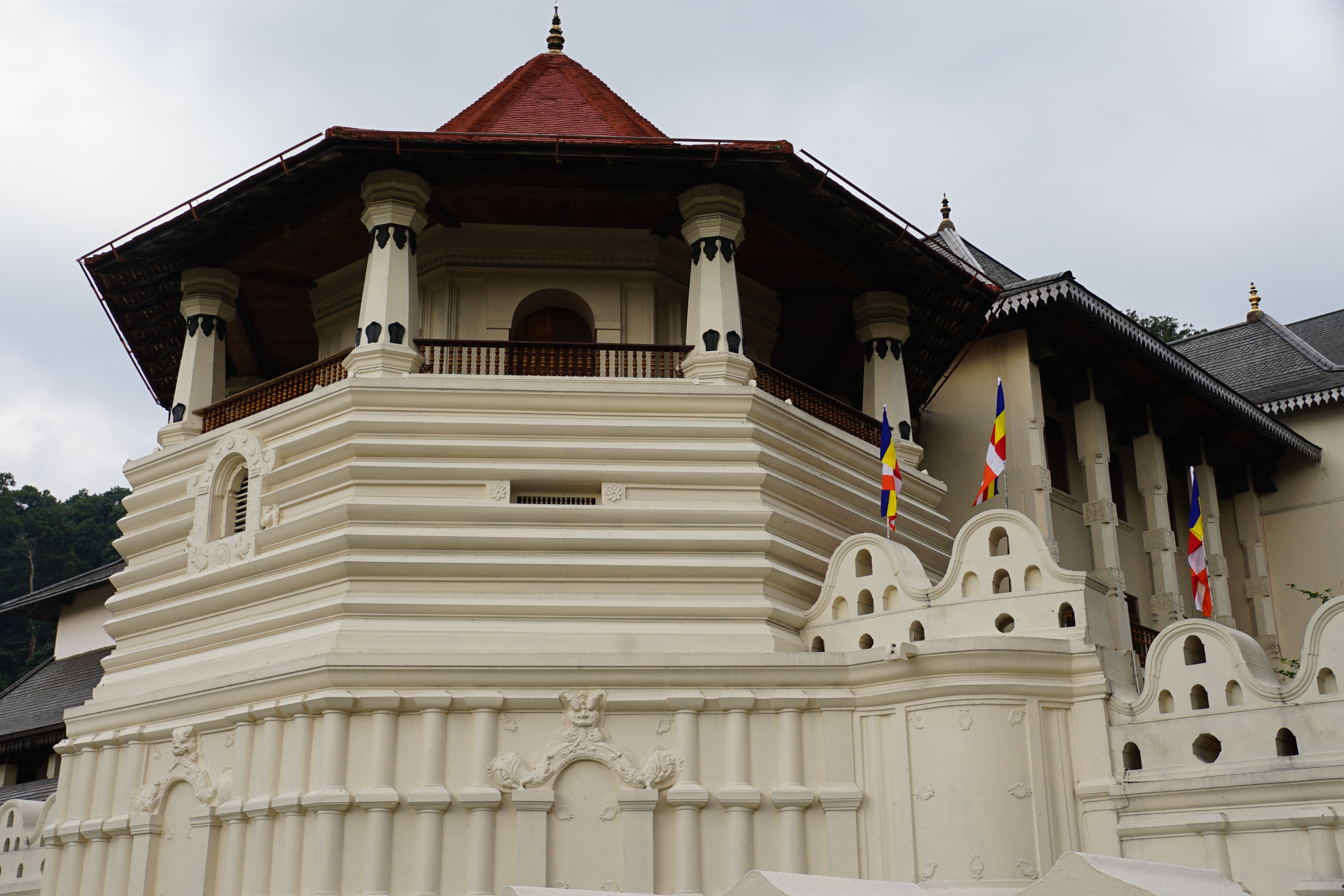

General information
- Type: Pavilion
- Location: Sri Dalada Maligawa, Kandy, Sri Lanka
- Construction started: 1802

The Paththirippuwa, also known as the Octagonal Pavilion, is a magnificent architectural structure located at the entrance of the Kandy Maligawa(Palace) in Sri Lanka.

The name is derived from the Tamil language, whereby "Parthu" means 'to see' and "Irippu" means 'seated', the combination of which is 'to sit and see all around'.

The front section of the temple, together with the Pattirippuwa was built in 1802, during the reign of King Sri Vickrama Rajasingha, by the royal architect, Devendra Moolacharya. Moolacharya is also credited with the designing and construction of the Magul Maduwa (the Audience Hall), the Kandy Lake (Kiri Muhuda), Walakula Bamma (Cloud Wall) and Diyarella Bemma. The Pattirippuwa was constructed on the site of the old temple kitchen.

The Pattirippuwa was intended as a place where Rajasingha could exhibit the sacred tooth relic to the surrounding populace, view the temple festivals, peraheras and on important occasions address his subjects. The symbolism of its octagonal form, reinforced the view that when the king stood in the tower, with the eight points in the compass radiating out around him he stood at the centre of the world.

During the British period, it had been used to house an oriental library where the upstairs was used to accommodate the library and downstairs to provide space for the librarian monk. It currently houses the temple's library of ancient palm leaf buddhist manuscripts and books.

On 11 February 1948, following the country's political independence from British rule, the national flag (Lion Flag) was raised for the first time over the Paththirippuwa.

On 25 January 1998 the temple, including the Pattirippuwa, was severely damaged following the detonation of a truck bomb by Liberation Tigers of Tamil Eelam. The restoration work on the Pattirippuwa was undertaken by the Sri Lanka Ports Authority, under the managing director, H. A. Wijegunawardhana, with the guidance of the Department of Archaeology. The restoration process took over a year and was completed by August 1999.
