= Minnette de Silva =

Sri Lankan architect (1918–1998)

- මිනට් ද සිල්වා
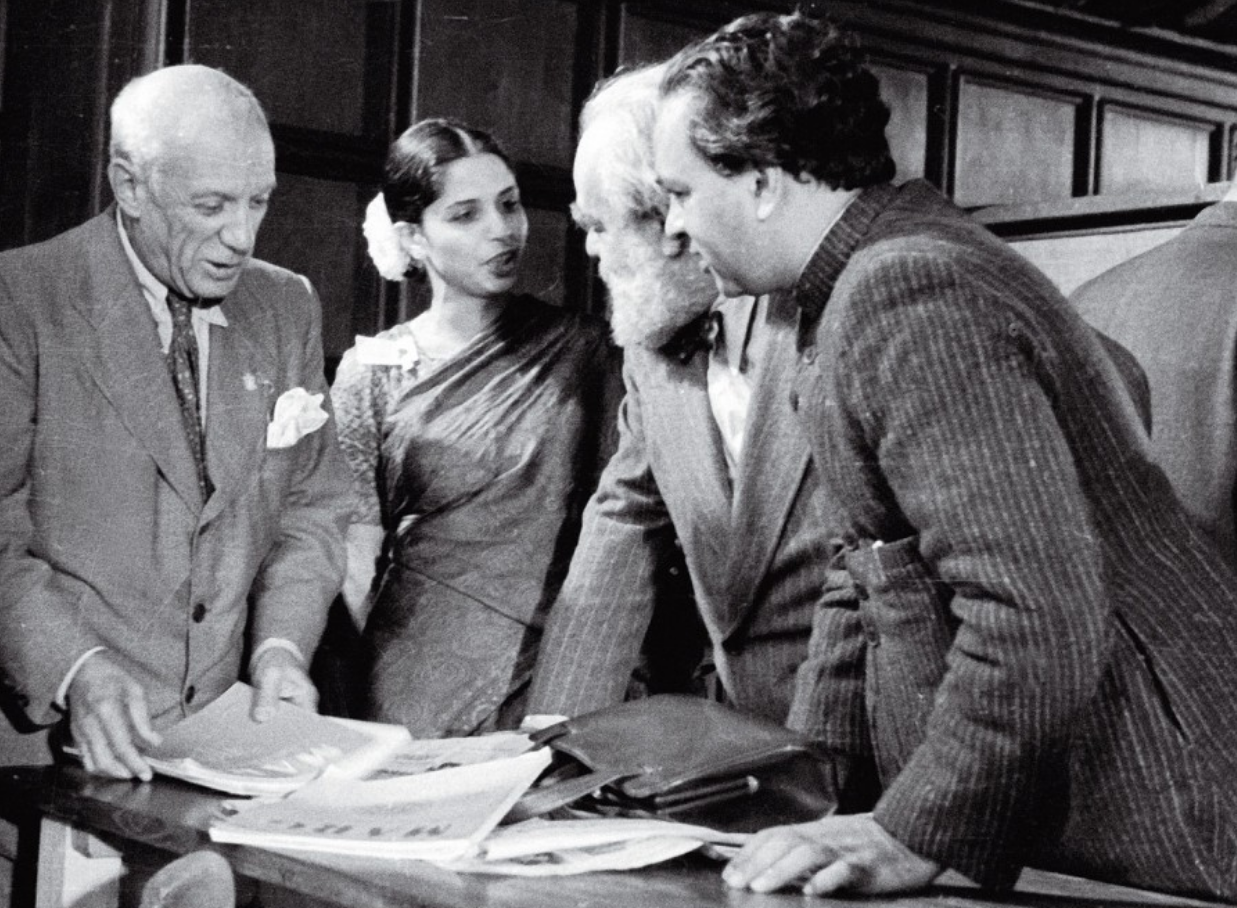
- Minnette de Silva with Pablo Picasso (left) at the World Congress of Intellectuals in Defense of Peace (Wrocław, Republic of Poland, 1948)
- Born: Minnette de Silva; 1 February 1918; Kandy, Ceylon
- Died: 24 November 1998 (aged 80); Kandy, Sri Lanka
- Education: Sir Jamsetjee Jeejebhoy School of Art; Architectural Association School of Architecture
- Occupation: Architect
- Parent(s): George E. de Silva; Agnes de Silva
- Awards: SLIA Gold Medal (1996)
- Practice: Minnette de Silva Associates
- Buildings: See below
- Projects: Kandy Art Centre

Minnette de Silva (Sinhala: මිනට් ද සිල්වා;Tamil: மினிட் டி சில்வா; 1 February 1918 – 24 November 1998) was an internationally recognised Sri Lankan architect, considered the pioneer of the modern architectural style in Sri Lanka. De Silva was a fellow of the Sri Lanka Institute of Architects (SLIA),

De Silva was the first Sri Lankan woman to be trained as an architect and the first Asian woman to be elected an associate of the Royal Institute of British Architects (RIBA) in 1948. She was also the first Asian representative of Congrès International d'Architecture Moderne (CIAM) in 1947 and was one of the founding members of the architectural publication Marg. She was awarded the SLIA Gold Medal for her contribution to architecture, in particular her pioneering work developing a "regional modernism for the tropics".

== Early life (1918–1930) ==
Minnette de Silva was born on 1 February 1918 in Kandy, the second largest city of the island nation now known as Sri Lanka. The country was then called Ceylon, and had been ruled by the British Empire as a crown colony for over a century, and before that, by the Dutch and Portuguese empires. These and other European traders, sailors, and officials had settled there and given rise to a small Eurasian ethnic group of mixed descent, the Burgher people. During British rule, they occupied a highly important place in Sri Lankan social and economic life. Minette was born into one of these influential families. A recent critic wrote: "In her home country, she remained an outsider due to her mixed heritage; while in the West, her beauty and clothes served to exoticise her."

Her father was George E. de Silva, a proctor (criminal barrister) at the time of her birth, who then moved into politics. Lauded as a "champion of the poor", he served as president of the Ceylon National Congress, and as a Minister of Health (his own father had been an Ayurvedic physician). His eulogy was delivered by the sometime prime minister, S. W. R. D. Bandaranaike, who compared him to an early president of the United States: "In the mould of Abraham Lincolon [sic], he was a man who travelled from the Log Cabin to White House".

Her mother was Agnes de Silva (née Nell), a campaigner for women's rights and Sri Lankan independence. She was "from one of the conservative Dutch families", who opposed her union to George; the vicar refused to solemnise the marriage. The wedding was celebrated in 1909 at St. Paul's Church, Kandy by W. S. Senior, the bard of Sri Lanka. Agnes's aunt was Winifred Nell, an "outstanding pioneer woman doctor" Agnes co-founded in 1927 the Women's Franchise Union. to press for full suffrage (voting rights) for all women in the country. Minette de Silva also recounts that her mother’s involvement in the Arts and Crafts Movement exposed her to various traditions that are reflected in her later work as an architect.

Minette was the youngest of five children. Her sister Anil de Silva became an art critic and historian. Her brother Fredrick de Silva became a lawyer and politician, serving as Mayor of Kandy, a member of Parliament, and Ambassador to France.

De Silva was first educated at the Kandy Convent at age 7 before being transferred to the Bishop’s College Boarding School in Colombo. In 1928, her family moved to England, where she attended St. Mary's, in Brighton. On her father’s request, she returned to Ceylon in the 1930s. De Silva did not complete her formal education, due to circumstances related to her father’s financial crisis and political life, and her mother’s ailing health.

She was not able to train as an architect in Colombo, so she had to persuade her father and her maternal uncle Dr Andreas Nell (1864-1956) to allow her to travel to Bombay to train at the Sir Jamsetjee Jeejebhoy School of Art.

== Education (1930–1948) ==
India (1938–1942)

As de Silva did not complete her school matriculation, equivalent to today’s Advanced Level, she had to work as an apprentice for the Bombay-based firm, Mistri and Bhedwar, where she befriended Perin Mistri and her brother Minoo. During her apprenticeship, she returned to Sri Lanka, where she attended lectures at the Ceylon Technical College. In Bombay she studied at a private academy run by G. B. Mhatres, where instructors included many influential practising architects such as Homi Billmoria, Yahya Merchant, and M. Parelkar. She also assisted Shareef Mooloobhoy on his final portfolio.

De Silva was part of the cultural and political circles which included Mulk Raj Anand and Ravi Shankar and became the architectural editor for Marg, a new publication at the time on modern art and culture. Later she enrolled at the Sir Jamsetjee Jeejebhoy School of Art.

Government School of Architecture

During the time of political upheaval in India, she attended a Free Gandhi March and as a result was expelled for not writing an apology to the head of the School. She then started working as the apprentice assistant to the émigré architect and planner Otto Koenigsberger in his office in Bangalore, working on prefabricated housing for the Tata Steel City plan in Bihar. She was there for approximately seven months.

Architectural Association (1945–1948)

During a brief visit to Ceylon, de Silva met Herwald Ramsbotham, the Governor-General of Ceylon, who took a keen interest in her situation and personally intervened in his capacity as head of the Education Committee in the UK and managed to arrange a place for her at the Architectural Association to allow her to take a special Royal Institute of British Architects examination for students returning from the war.

CIAM

De Silva was also the delegate representing India-Ceylon in the Congrès Internationaux D’Architecture Moderne (CIAM) from 1946 to 1957. It was here she met Le Corbusier with whom she maintained a long friendship.

== Career ==
=== Early career (1948–1962) ===
External videos
- Minnette de Silva, Wrocław, 1948, YouTube video

De Silva returned to Sri Lanka in 1949 on the insistence of her father, who requested her to make her contribution to the newly independent country. She returned to her parents’ home, St. George's, where she started her architectural career without any money of her own. Although her parents would have liked her to take a reliable salaried position, she stayed in Kandy and pursued her career independently, as she had her roots there and it was the cultural and traditional centre of the nation. This was important to her as she had been brought up in an atmosphere of the patriotic political and cultural commitments of her parents to the community and the country. De Silva, who as a child lived and moved among Kandyan artists and craftsmen, was taken by her parents to see the ancient Sinhalese architecture of the Anuradhapura and Polonnaruwa periods. Like her parents, she was greatly influenced by Ananda Coomaraswamy, who advocated for the preservation of the traditional arts and crafts, local craftsmen and the building methods and materials, and was one of the first Sri Lankan architects to become a patron of the local craftsmen. She develop her own style of architecture which is still apparent in the Sri Lankan architecture of today, and was one of the first architects to incorporate building knowledge acquired in the West with that of Sri Lanka and India.

Her first building was the Karunaratne House in Kandy. The 1949 commission came from friends of her parents: Algy Karunaratne, who was a lawyer, and Letty Karunaratne, who asked her to build a house for Rs 40,000. She prepared plans for a split level house for a site on a hill, the first of a kind in Kandy. It was the first building designed by a woman in Sri Lanka and attracted much attention and controversy. She had to tackle many problems early on as a result of being the first and only woman architect in Sri Lanka. The fact that she worked independently in a male dominated sector, without a male partner nor an established firm, rendered distrust of contractors, businesses, the government and architectural patrons.

After completing the Karuṇāratne house in 1951, the rest of the 1950s was de Silva's busiest decade throughout her career.

During this time, she was responsible for the design and materialization of projects ranging from public housing buildings to schools. Between 1950 - 1951, de Silva designed the Jinaraja College in Gampola, a tiered grade school that embraced the natural landscape of central Sri Lanka. De Silva preferred to accept the existing environment - including mountainous and sloping terrain - as opposed to appropriating and flattening it for construction purposes, in a process that blended architecture with the environment. Influenced by the natural hierarchy of the slope, De Silva placed classrooms for kindergarteners at the bottom, and senior classes at the top. The potential for expansion was also top of mind for de Silva, which she worked into her design proposal: "the scheme allowed for further development and necessary flexibility of a school building," she wrote in her memoirs. Jinaraja College serves as an exemplar for her emphasis on architectural synthesis with the natural world.

In addition to private commissions, she also explored public housing as a way to tackle the climbing costs of living, describing this movement as “a really early example of community architecture” (P39, Minette De Silva: Intersections (London: MACK, 2024)). Determined to place primary emphasis on the “users” of the scheme, she sent out two questionnaires asking for potential residents' preference for building type, lifestyle, and economic capabilities. With the results of these surveys, she went on to develop five distinct house type plans that varied in size and cost, providing options for families. She wrote in her memoirs that this project “was really a great success” and that “there is a tremendous felicitous community spirit”.

=== Travels (1962–1973) ===
In 1962 de Silva's mother died and she subsequently suffered from bouts of ill health and depression. Throughout the 1960s she travelled, spending long periods away from Sri Lanka and allowing her practice to falter. Her career started to decline just as Geoffrey Bawa began his.

In 1960 de Silva left Sri Lanka for 5 years, calling it her period of self-renewal. She spent this time travelling in Greece, Iran, Pakistan, and Afghanistan and revisited India. After her return to Sri Lanka she was engaged in the design of a series of large tourist hotels. De Silva's work and life are discussed in Flora Samuel's book Le Corbusier: Architect and Feminist.

=== London and Hong Kong (1973–1979) ===
With a change in government in Sri Lanka in the 1970s, de Silva and many others of the same outlook felt uncomfortable with the Bandaranaike government. In 1973 she closed her office and moved to London, renting a flat on Baker Street from Maxwell Fry and Jane Drew. While in London she wrote the whole section on South Asian architecture in the new (18th) edition of Banister Fletcher's A History of Architecture.

De Silva's work on A History of Architecture opened the doors for her to join the Department of Architecture, at the University of Hong Kong, where she was appointed lecturer in the History of Asian Architecture. She stayed in Hong Kong from 1975 to 1979 and pioneered a new way to teach the history of architecture in an Asian context. During this period she curated an exhibition that was shown at the Commonwealth Institute in London with the large collection of photographs of vernacular Asian architecture she had amassed. De Silva also had plans to write her own comprehensive history of Asian architecture for the Athlone Press; however this came to nothing.

=== Back in Kandy (1979–1998) ===
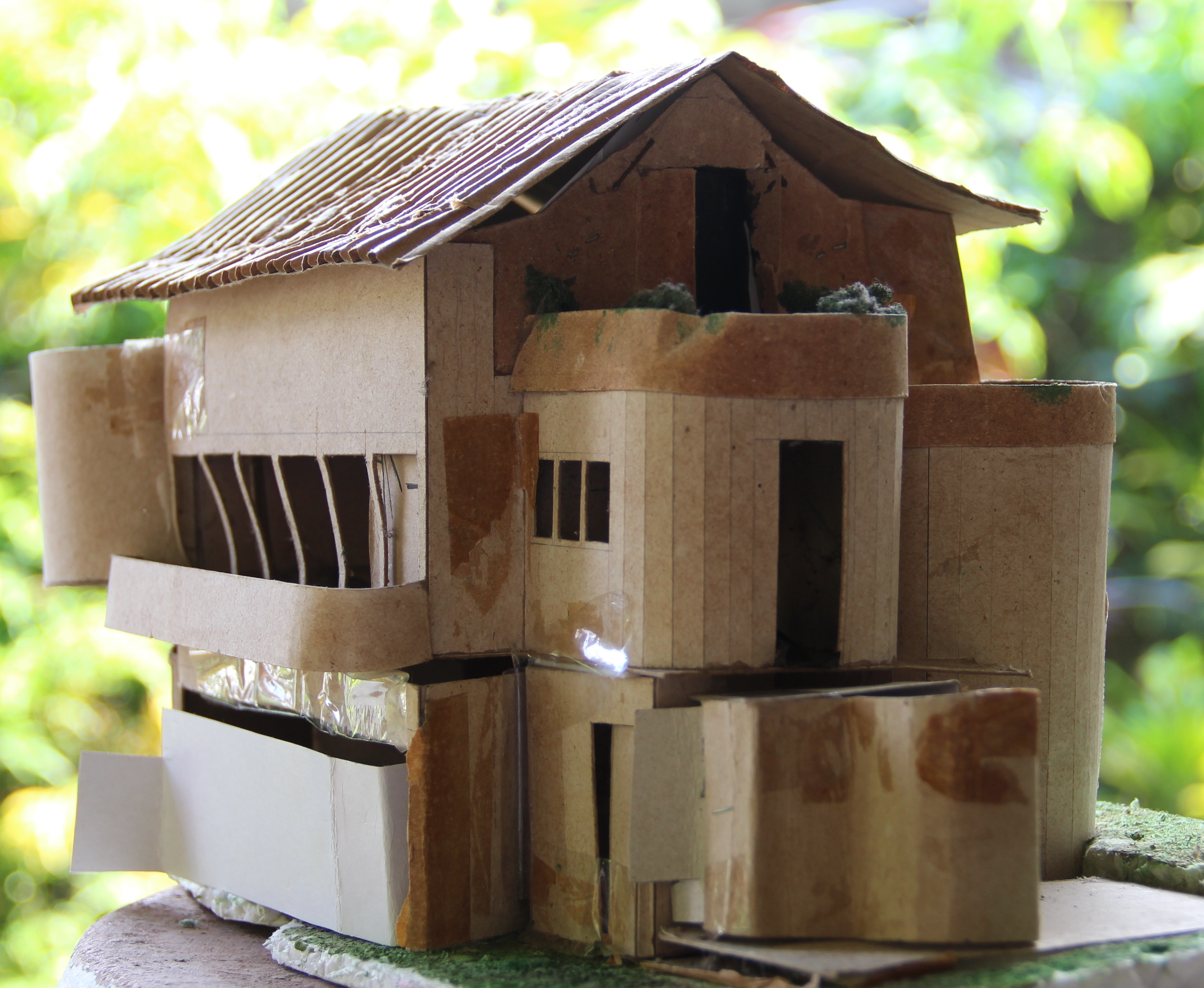
A model of the house designed for the artist Segar

Upon her return to Kandy in 1979, de Silva tried to revive what was left of her architectural practice, but had difficulty in recruiting experienced staff. This was the last phase of her architectural career and she went on to complete only three more buildings. In 1982 de Silva settled down to work on the Kandy Art Association and Centenary Culture Centre in her hometown. The centre was designed with many levelled Kandyan flat tiled roofs and symbiotic indigenous features: thorana (gateways), midulas (open courts), mandapas (pavilions), rangahala (space for dance and music), and avanhala (refectory).

The centre was designed as a large interactive space where a number of activities could take place with a strong symbiotic relationship of architecture and entertainment. The excavated area to the rear formed a natural amphitheatre, and the 150-year-old building adjoining the site became a focus of the new design. A Kandyan village setting with trees and plants was a pleasing foil to the Temple of the Tooth and the Malwatta Vihara (residence of the high priest of the sect). De Silva willed the art centre to be the most characteristic and living illustration in the region of contemporary Kandyan architecture.

== Death ==
De Silva died after falling from her bathtub at home in the Frazer Memorial Ward of Kandy Hospital on 24 November 1998, at the age of 80. Her family spread her ashes in the Mahaweli River.

== Legacy ==
In 1996, two years before her death, and after being largely ignored during much of her career, de Silva was awarded the Gold Medal by the Sri Lanka Institute of Architects.

The closest thing she published to an account of her life was "a charmingly illustrated ‘scrapbook’ autobiography", The Life and Works of an Asian Woman Architect - unedited, published posthumously, and incomplete.

She is considered to be one of the thinkers behind critical regionalism, an approach which seeks to provide an architecture rooted in the modern tradition, but tied to geographical and cultural context. She called it Modern Regionalist Architecture, a way of design that takes into consideration the social and material needs of poor countries, by using locally available material, for example, to reduce building costs. Her design methodology was innovative in including participation and consultation.

De Silva’s architecture also engaged with landscape, climate, and material-ecology — not as an add-on, but as integral to her design logic. Her work weaved together the terrain, vegetation, climate (especially tropical), materials and craft in ways that challenged a generic, placeless modernism. In emphasising climate response, de Silva’s work was an early version of what later came to be known as “tropical modernism”, a modern architecture that is regionally rooted rather than transplanted. For her, ecology was not merely environmental in a technical sense, but cultural, social, material and spatial.

De Silva adapted modernist structural techniques (concrete slabs, pilotis) but modified them for tropical conditions: e.g., large overhangs, deep loggias, verandas, open plans, cross-ventilation, movable screens. She rejected the “International Style” approach of glass box in favour of forms responsive to sun, rain, and wind. The building becomes a device for controlling climate rather than resisting it. For example, her use of pilotis raises building off ground for air circulation; loggias wrap façades to provide shade; courtyards act as thermal regulators.

From a material perspective, de Silva's designs integrated machined architectural elements, such as concrete mixed and cast in the style of beton brut with organic ones such as flowering plants, grasses, soils, and rock (P20, Minette De Silva: Intersections (London: MACK, 2024). Her material compositions conflated the interior and exterior of buildings. Examples include exterior window frame elements on the interior of a building, open-air interior rooms (which may be commonplace in Sri Lanka today, but were still rare in the 1950s and 1960s), and intimate exterior spaces, reflecting her evocative understandings of the urban enclaves of Colombo and the cross-section of the hill country of Kandy.

De Silva developed the design strategies of these early projects in each of her built works over the course of her career, inviting movement through the cross section of a site and sequencing the promenade to anchor and articulate that movement, creating haptic experiences of thresholds and vistas, constructing spatially distinct moments with architecturally framed views, and mobilising dynamic relationships between materials. With these methods, she attempted to deepen the inhabitants' engagement with the constructed landscape. It highlighted that in a post-colonial context, the landscape and climate are not constraints to be overcome but assets to be incorporated. De Silva turned the tropical challenge into a design virtue.

Building on the revivalist efforts launched by her parents' generation, de Silva worked with impoverished crafts-based communities around Kandy and actively engaged in crafts production including handloom weaving, mat weaving and wood lacquering. The incorporation of traditional crafts elements in the Karunaratne House, her first independent project, became a recurring theme in other architectural projects throughout her life. By cohering craftsmanship and the fine arts, de Silva remarkably imbricated local heritage with architecture of the present day.

During South Asian Heritage Month, the British architect Sumita Singha OBE summed up the achievements of de Silva:

Like her own ethnicity, de Silva’s architecture borrowed from Sri Lankan and Western contexts. Using modern materials such as concrete and rough finishes for light-filled and airy designs, along with ‘traditional’ materials such as earth and bamboo, handwoven textiles, lacquerware, brass; and wood carvings, her work was uniquely of the place. She was also able to help local artisans, particularly women, through her work and advocacy....De Silva’s decision to practise from the ‘backwaters’ of Kandy is cited as the reason for her lack of work, but essentially, de Silva was a woman in a man’s world - whether in her home country or outside it. Ahead of her time, de Silva’s ideas were popularised by men, but she was not credited properly. ...[She] was compared unflatteringly with men, but she was the one who took the risks. ...It is time to recognise the great architect that she was as well as salute her personal bravery as a woman striving to help others, despite her own problems.

== List of works ==
Most of her 40 works have been demolished or altered and archives lost.

1940s

- Karunaratne House, Kandy (1947–51)

1950s

- Jinaraja College, Gampola (1950–51)
- Red Cross Hall, Kandy (1950) (Unbuilt)
- Day Nursery Extension, Kandy (1950) (Unbuilt)
- Pieris House I, Colombo (1952–6)
- Daswani House, Kandy (1952)
- House for businessman, Nawala (1952) (Never built)
- Wickremaratna House, Colombo (1953)
- Open Air Theatre for the Arts Council in Colombo, Colombo, (1953–54)
- C. H. Fernando House, Wellawatte (1954)
- Mrs. D. Wickremasinghe Flats, Colombo, (1954)
- Senanayake Flats, Colombo, (1954–57)
- Asoka Amarasinghe House, Kollupitiya (1954)
- Dr. Chandra Amarasinghe Flats, Colombo, (1954–55)
- Aluwihare Sports Pavilion, Police Park, Kandy (1955)
- Bunnie Molamure House, Bolgoda, (1955)
- Sri Rao House, Bangalore (1955) (Proposal)
- Ivor Fernando Flats, Colombo, (1956)
- V. Sachithanandam House, Colombo, (1956)
- Mrs. N. De Saram House, Colombo, (1956–57)
- Art Centre, Horana (1957) (Unbuilt)
- Dr. Perera House, Colombo, (1957–58)
- Watapuluwa Housing Scheme, Kandy (1958)
- Amaduwa Game Reserve Lodges, Kandy (1958) (Proposal)
- Sri Palee Open Air Theatre, University of Peradeniya, (1958–59)
- Ceylon Match Factory (1958)
- General Habibullah Defence Academy Chief's House, India, (1958–59)
- A. G. De Silva House, Cinnamon Gardens (1958–59)
- Kalkudah Sea Side Resort, Kalkudah (1959)
- Hikkaduwa Rest House, Hikkaduwa (1959) (Renovation)

1960s

- Chandra Amarasinghe House, Colombo, (1960)
- Dr. Hensman House, Ratmalana, (1960–61)
- Dr. P. H. Amarasinghe House, Colombo, (1960)
- Dr. Nadesan Villa, Kandy, (1960–61)
- R. G. Senanayake House, (1960–61)(Unbuilt)
- Keerthisinghe House, (1961)(Unbuilt)
- Pieris House II, Colombo (1963)

1970s

- Coomaraswamy Twin Houses, Colombo (1970)
- Seneviratne House, Kandy, (1972)
- Gamini Wickremasinghe Flat, Colombo, (1972)
- Dr. and Mrs. PVJ Jayasekera House, Kandy, (1974)

1980s

- Kandy Arts Centre, Kandy (1982–84)

1990s

- Segar House, Ja-Ela (1991)
- Siriwardene House, Colombo (1992)

== Bibliography ==
- De Silva, Minnette The life & work of an Asian woman architect (Volume I), Colombo, 1998, ISBN 9559512005
- Siddiqi, Anooradha Iyer. Minnette de Silva: Intersections. London: MACK, 2024. ISBN 9781915743534

== See also ==
- Geoffrey Bawa
- Andrew Boyd
