= Gender inequality in Sri Lanka =

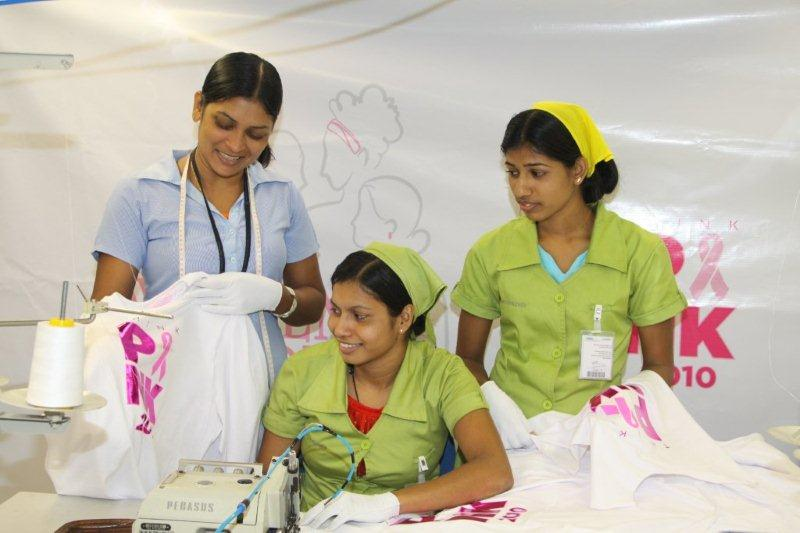
Sri Lankan garment workers

Gender inequality in Sri Lanka is centered on the inequalities that arise between men and women in Sri Lanka. Specifically, these inequalities affect many aspects of women's lives, starting with sex-selective abortions and male preferences, then education and schooling in childhood, which influence job opportunities, property rights, access to health and political participation in adulthood. While Sri Lanka is ranked well on several gender equality indices in comparison to other countries in the region, there are also some sources that question the verity of these indices. However, globally, Sri Lanka ranks relatively lower on gender equality indices. Overall, this pattern of social history that disempowers females produces a cycle of undervaluing females, providing only secondary access to health care and schooling and thus fewer opportunities to take on high level jobs or training, which then exacerbates the issue of low political participation and lowered social rights, a cycle studied and noted on by Dr. Elaine Enarson, a disaster sociologist studying the connection between disaster and the role of women.

== History ==
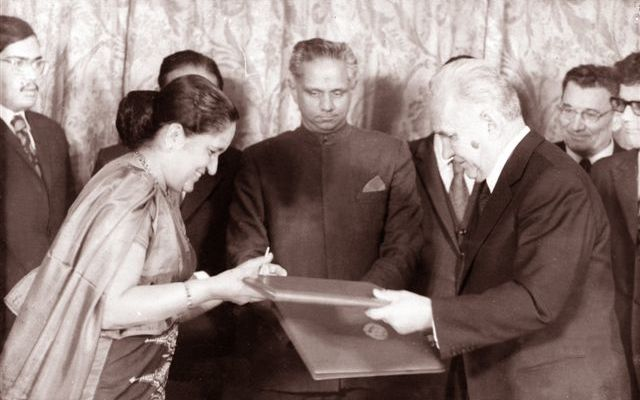
Mrs. Sirimavo Bandaranaike in Russia with Alexei Kosygin Premier of the Soviet Union

In 1960, Sri Lanka elected Sirimavo Bandaranaike, the world's first female head of state and Sri Lanka's first female prime minister.

Throughout the history of Sri Lanka, there has been significant progress in respect to women's rights. Specifically, following the International Women's Year in 1975 and the United Nations Decade for Women from 1976 to 1985, a number of policies and laws were enacted to enhance the rights of women in the Sri Lankan government. In 1981, the Convention on the Elimination of All Forms of Discrimination against Women held, and additionally, the third chapter of the Constitution on Fundamental Rights was also adopted into the constitution. Article 12 of the chapter apprised that, "No citizen shall be discriminated against on the grounds of race, religion, language, caste, sex, political opinion, place of birth or any such grounds". There is some criticism of the clause as it does not specifically state women to independently deserve additional rights are instead included within a list of other disadvantaged statuses.

Further developments included the establishment of both the National Plan of Action for Women and Women's Charter in 1996. The National Plan of Action for Women was the result of the UN meeting on the Commission on Status of Women, which was held during early 2005. Its purpose is to achieve gender equality via legislative changes and policy programs, and all signatories of the plan committed to achieve the goal.

Throughout Sri Lanka's history, women have played a large role, especially when it comes to politics and previous armed conflicts. However, gender inequality is still a prevalent issue in Sri Lanka.

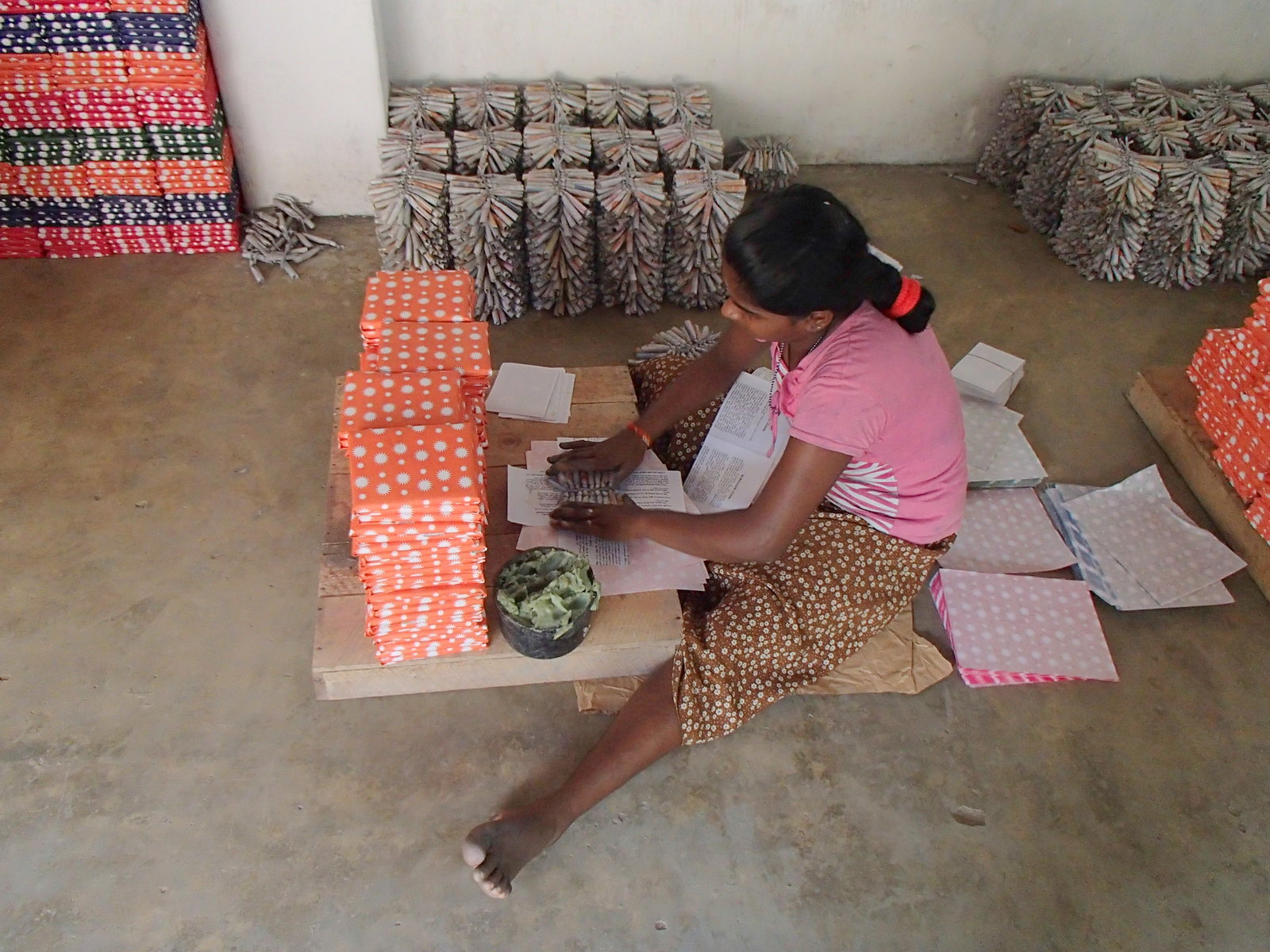
Sri Lankan woman working

== Global rankings ==
There are a number of different organizations and developed methods of measuring the amount of development a country has achieved, which can focus specifically on human, economic or social development, as well as a number of other factors. A number of statistics will also combine these focuses to try to have a fuller picture of development in different countries. According to the World Economic Forum, Sri Lanka ranks 55th in the world when it comes to gender equality gap, 109th in Economic Participation and Opportunity rank, 48th in educational attainment and 30th in political participation.

Sri Lanka is ranked 73/187, a 0.750 HDI (Human Development Index) ranking. Additionally, it is ranked 75th out of the 149 countries listed in the 2013 Gender Inequality Index (GII). The GII is similar to the HDI in that it looks at the differences between men and women of different countries; the higher ranked a country is, the larger the gap is between the genders. The GII combines three main factors that tend to create achievement gaps between the genders. Firstly, adolescent birth rates and maternal mortality are measured to demonstrate reproductive health. Secondly, labor market participation rates are measured to convey economic status. And thirdly, they measure the proportion of women who work in parliament and levels of education, which make up the "empowerment" factor.

Year	Human Development Index	Gender Inequality Index
2010	91/187	-
2011	91/187	-
2012	92/187	-
2013	73/187	75/149
2014	73/187	75/149

While Sri Lanka ranks in the middle in global rankings, it ranks relatively high when compared to neighboring countries. The Gender Inequality Index is based upon the following aspects: reproductive health, empowerment, and participation in the workforce. The table below describes the statistics that make up each of the above topics. Specifically, maternal mortality ratio and adolescent birth rate make up reproductive health, female seats in parliament and population with some secondary education make up empowerment, and labor force participation makes up the workforce section.

	GII value	GII Rank	Maternal mortality ratio	Adolescent birth rate	Female seats in parliament (%)	Population with at least some secondary education (%) -male	Population with at least some secondary education (%) - female	Labor force participation rate (%) - male	Labor force participation rate (%) - female
Sri Lanka	.383	75	35.0	16.9	5.8	75.5	72.7	76.4	35.0
Pakistan	.565	126	260.0	27.3	19.7	46.1	19.3	82.9	24.4
South Asia	.531	-	202.0	38.3	17.8	48.5	33.4	80.7	30.7
High HDI	.315	-	42.0	26.4	18.8	69.1	60.2	77.1	57.0

== Causes ==
=== Patriarchal society ===
A patriarchy is defined as "a social system in which power is held by men, through cultural norms and customs that favor men and withhold opportunity from women".

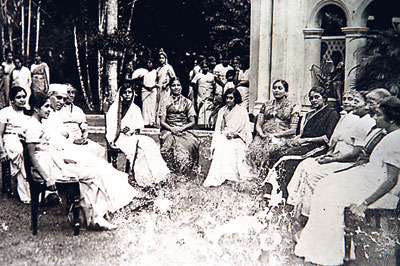
The Nehru family in Sri Lanka

Some of the main causes of this gender inequality is due to the patriarchal nature of Sri Lankan culture and the historical effects of the unbalanced weight put on the value of males. As time has passed, a shift in roles and expectations has started, moving towards more independence and empowerment for women. However, according to Matt Withers and Janaka Biyanwila, experts in labor migration and economies, "Sri Lanka's labour market remains heavily segmented and offers limited sustainable economic opportunity for a majority of women". Specifically, in markets where men are also deprived of labor rights, like that of crop plantations, women are found to be treated even worse by their male counterparts.

The patriarchal society in Sri Lanka that has been so entrenched in its history is intensely also perpetuated by the use of marriage as a social institution. Even while women may work at the same time as doing the majority of the housework and childcare, they are still marginalized as it is deemed socially incorrect to venture outside of the domestic sphere.

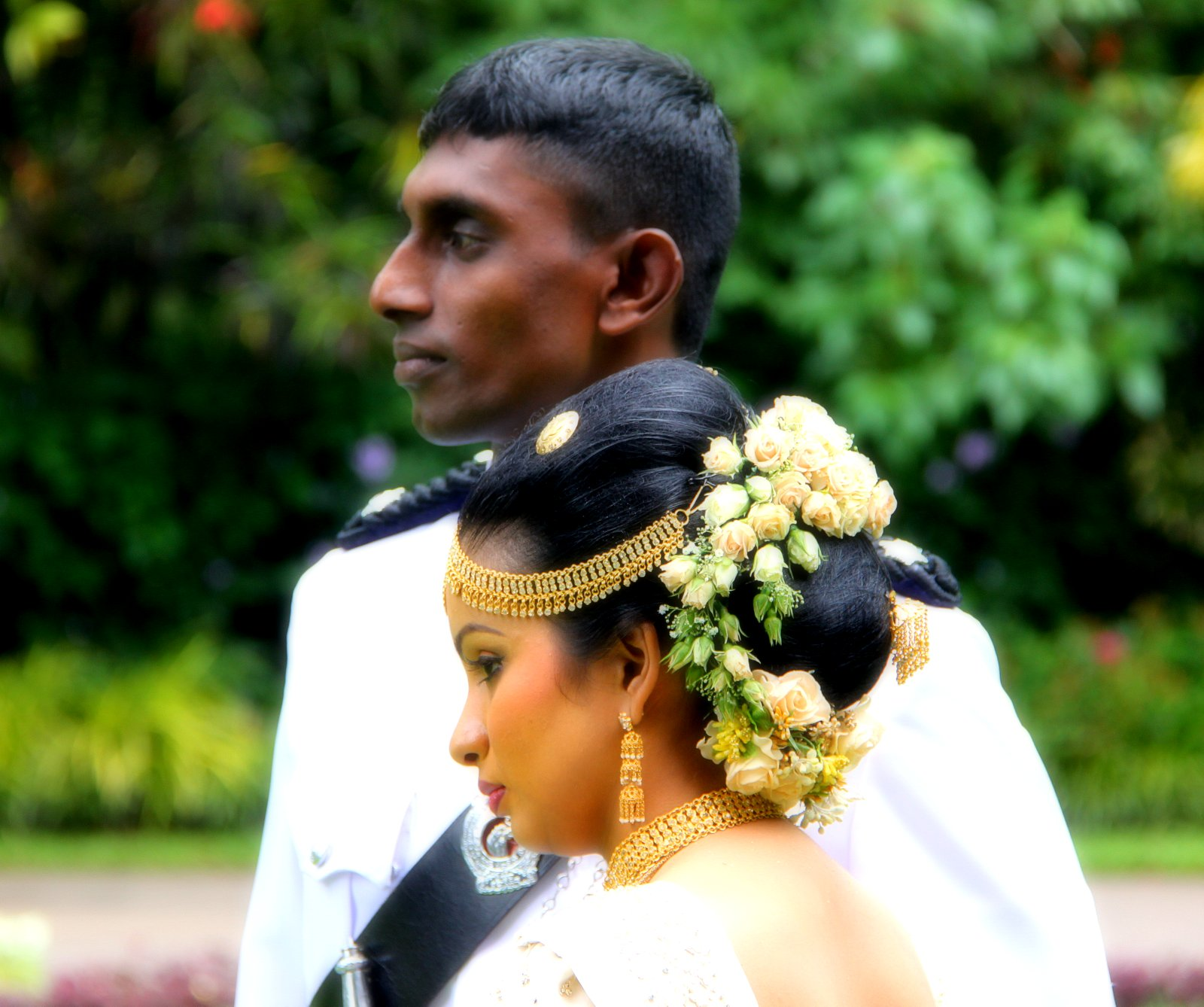
Wedding couple in Kandy, Sri Lanka

=== Dowry ===
Furthermore, gender inequality has also been continued by cultural practices, both legal and illegal, including the use of dowries and certain limiting marriage laws. Dowries have been shown to have both positive and negative effects on women, while on one hand they may enhance their marriageability and allow them to gain in social status, it also places a large amount of stress and pressure on the family of the bride to provide enough funds for the family of the groom. Usually, material gifts will be given to the daughter for her wedding and the groom's family will be compensated for what is sometimes deemed as the burden of the wife into the family. This also can lead to gender-based violence and domestic abuse when the husband or his family believe the dowry was not sufficient.

=== Marriage and property rights ===
According to a study by the Brookings Institution, inheritance and property rights are "relatively favorable for women in Sri Lanka", but as they describe, because of the multitude of different cultural groups in Sri Lanka, along with following the general law, they will follow various additional cultural practices and requirements. The Sinhalese, Northern Tamil and Muslim practices vary from practicing Kandyan law, Thesavalamai Law and Muslim law. The Muslims and Tamils additionally use the Kudi, a matrilocal system that is expressed in marriage and religious festivals. Because of these differences, there can be varying degrees of freedom when it comes to women's rights, despite having general laws that would normally protect the rights of women.

Natural disasters such as the tsunami in 2004 and historical ethnic conflicts have greatly affected the dowry system as many women lost some or all of their property and material possessions.

=== Son preference ===
The preference for male children and ensuing discrimination against girls has been a detriment to the status of women in Sri Lankan culture. Specifically, prenatal sex selection has been a crucial issue in discrimination against females, and experts have debated whether pre-natal sex selection might subsequently reduce postnatal discrimination. Compared to other countries in the surrounding area, such as India, preferences for sons have not been as mired in the culture as that of Sri Lanka and is thus considered an outlier in this region of high son preference. Furthermore, according to a study by the Bioscience research group, the slight cultural inclination to choose sons over daughters in Sri Lanka is expressed more within reproductive intentions instead of direct contraceptive action.

== Economic inequalities ==
=== Labor participation and wages ===
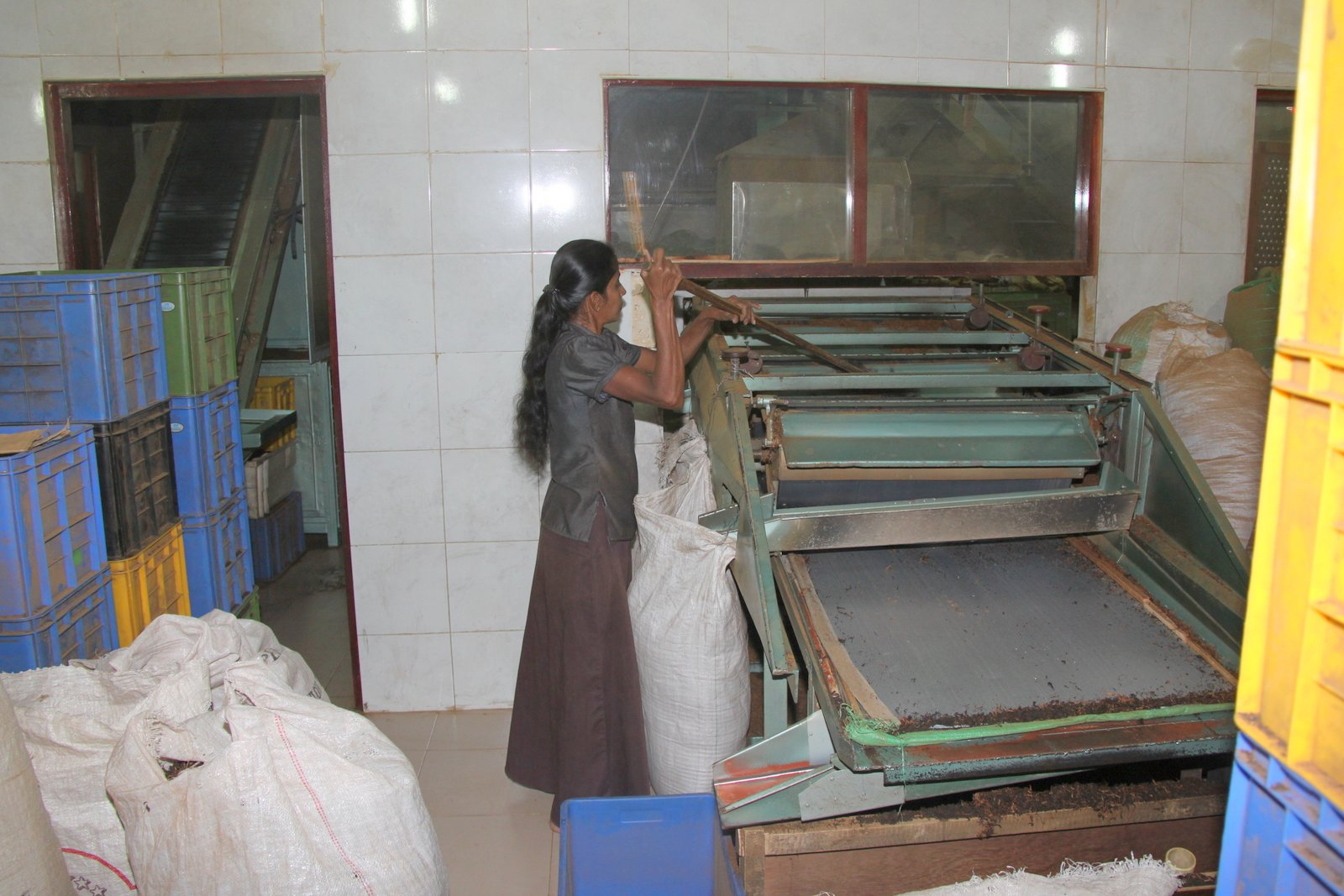
Sri Lankan woman working in tea factory

Historically, women in Sri Lanka have reduced access to quality employment, and even if they do obtain a job, they are paid far less and are subject to more harassment and limitations as compared to males working the same jobs. The Sri Lankan labor market is deeply separated and leaves little opportunity for women to gain access to jobs. Because of patriarchal policies embedded in the history of this region, women are over-represented in the low-paid, laborious industries of the country. Specifically, it is in these jobs that women face a disproportionate amount of labor discrimination and lack of proper wages in the name of international competitiveness and the production of additional jobs. However, again due to increased political involvement by females, the conditions for these workers, especially in industries such as export-processing, have been improving in past years.

=== Access to credit ===
Institutional restrictions such as access to credit and property also create large obstacles in the way of gender equality. According to the International Labour Organization, access to credit proves to be one of the largest, if not the largest, obstacles when it comes to women starting and running their own micro-enterprises. Since the mid-1970s, organizations have started providing alternative routes to access credit for women, including outlets such as social and intermediary NGO programs, poverty-oriented development banks, and savings and credit unions and cooperations. Having access to credit has been shown to add greatly to the capabilities of women, as seen in a study in Sri Lanka, being able to take out a loan allowed women to have more power when it came to bargaining with male members of the family.

=== Occupational inequalities ===
In many cases females are deprived of equal access to jobs, even when they are not well paid or high status. The unemployment rate for women in Sri Lanka was 13% in 2012, which was six times higher than that of males, according to the Labour Force Survey taken by the department of census and statistics.

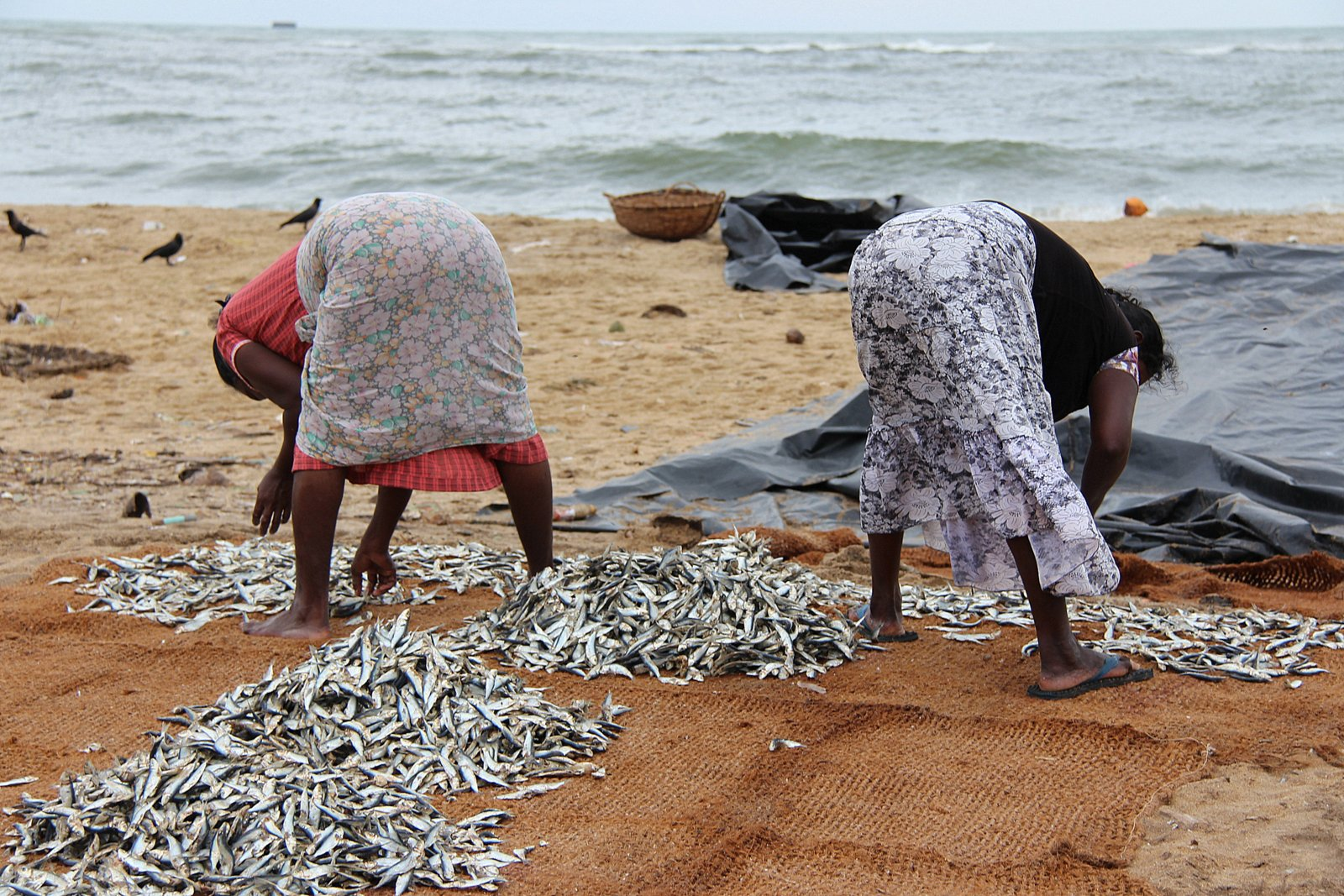
Women gathering sardines on a beach of Sri Lanka

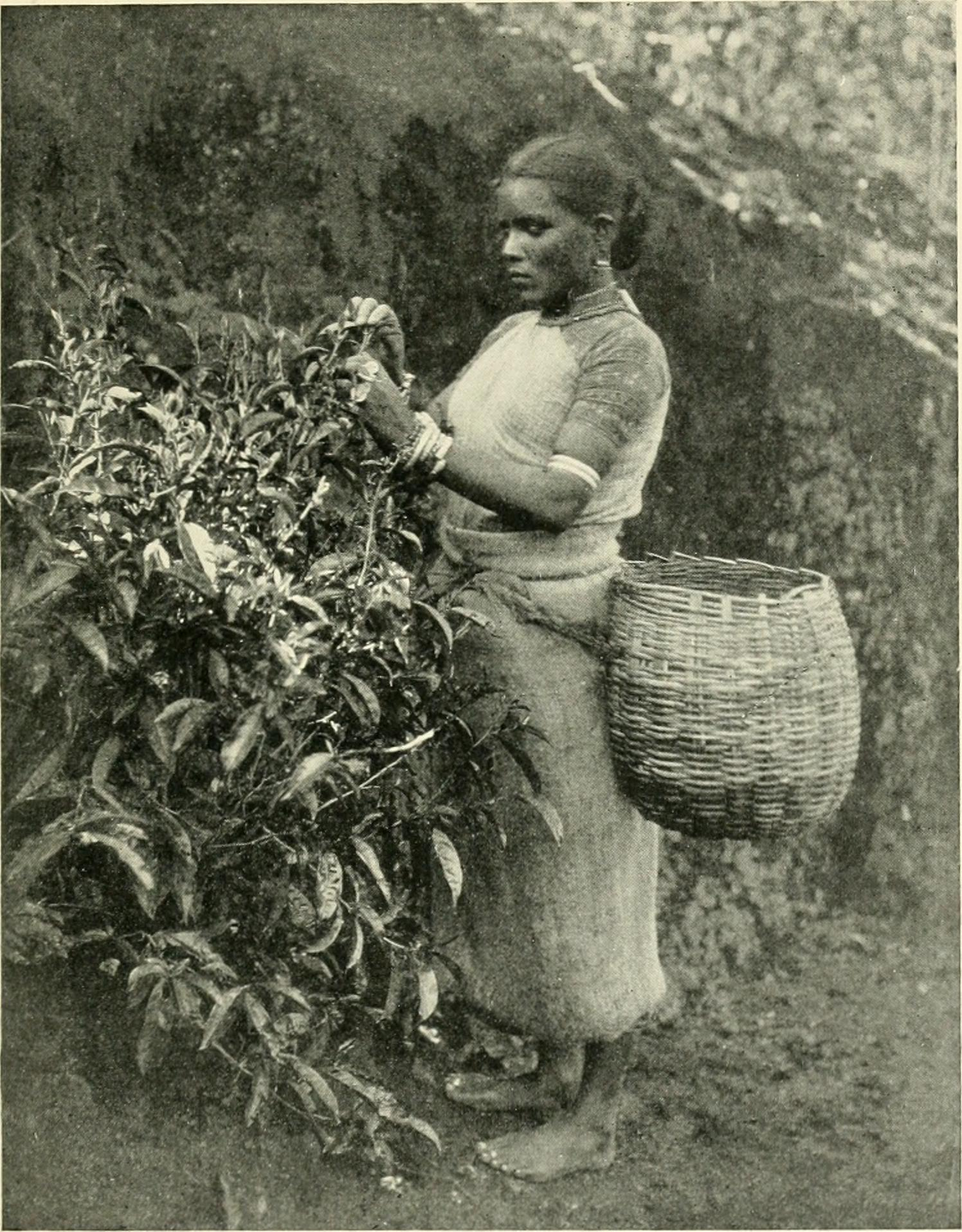
Sri Lankan woman working

Even while it may seem that these labor-intensive, export-focused jobs and the injustices women must endure through them are detrimental to their status and livelihood, they will in fact be the best possible option for these women and a good alternative to simply completing unpaid domestic work. The collective action and inaction of different nations to take a stand on equal labor rights, especially for women, is a more complicated issue than commonly described, as according to Naila Kabeer in Feminist Economics. In fact, according to Kabeer, for many of the women in this industry, these jobs prove to empower them and allow for additional independence in place of simply limiting their rights. However, other studies suggest that these low-paying heavy labor jobs simply are taken on by women because of economic necessity and do not contribute to their societal independence within the patriarchal society. Some argue that the reason women will rank their low-paying job as better than other options is because the other options they had as a domestic worker did not allow them to dispute bad working conditions or wages without losing their jobs.

In part because of the globalization of export industries, even while an industry might be becoming more competitive, the wages and working conditions have shown to be getting worse in what has been identified as a race to the bottom as industries look for cheaper and more docile labor to maximize profits.

== Education inequalities ==
=== Schooling ===
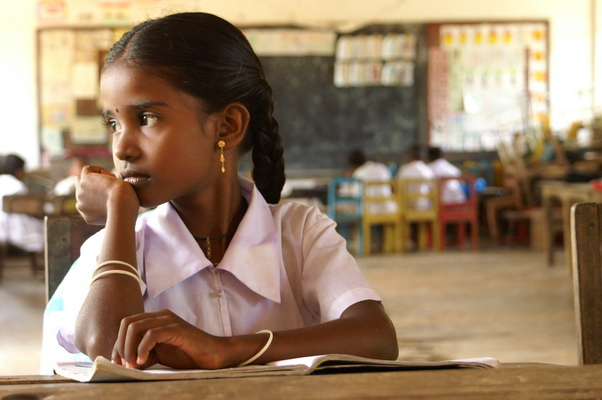
Sri Lankan girl in school

Literacy rates and retention rates of females in school remain an issue in Sri Lanka, even while they may be higher in rankings as compared to other nearby countries. In fact, according to the 2013 United Nations Gender Inequality Index, females are more likely to have some kind of secondary education; 75.5% of females reported having some kind of secondary education, compared to 72.5% of males. However, this is most likely due to the large disparity of female to male statistics when it comes to working in the labor market, as 76.4% of men participate in the workforce in Sri Lanka, while only 35% of women were shown to be participating in the workforce in a study done by the Human Development Report sector of the United Nations in 2013.

=== Literacy ===
Education in Sri Lanka is a large focus for the country as a whole; its constitution upholds education as a basic right for all people. The educational system in Sri Lanka was developed after its integration into the British Empire in the 19th century and since then the Central Government and the Provincial Councils have shared responsibility of providing free education for the population. With a literacy rate of 91.2% (92.6% for males, 90% for females), Sri Lanka ranks as the most literate country in South Asia. According to statistics, there are approximately 9,830 public schools providing free educations for over 4 million students.

== Health inequalities ==
=== Sex-selective abortion ===
Because Sri Lanka has been deemed to have a low preference for daughters, as compared to other countries in the region, sex-selective abortions have been stated as less of a concern. While in Sri Lanka only 51% of pregnancies will result in males, in India, 55% of pregnancies result in sons and in China, 56%. And some experts claim that the phenomenon of sex-selective abortion that is so prevalent in other parts of South Asia to be almost nonexistent in Sri Lanka. However, others argue that while there were definitely significant drops in numbers from previous decades, and relative to other areas, there are significant fewer on average, this practice does still occur.

=== Access to healthcare ===
Since Sri Lanka gained its independence in 1948, the government has focused on maintaining and supporting free healthcare for all. This has allowed for most babies to be born in hospitals and thus relative low rates of maternal mortality.

Related to the cultural preference for sons, females in families that do prefer sons will usually only receive secondary health care. This, when combined with a lack of education, perpetuates the lack of information generally known by women about their reproductive rights.

=== Gender-based violence ===
Gender-based violence is another way that women are subjected to the limitations men create for them and how the patriarchal aspect of society can be perpetuated through marriage. Violence against women has been decreed as a violation of women's rights by the United Nations. It is defined as, "[A]ny act of verbal or physical force, coercion or life-threatening deprivation, directed at an individual woman or girl that causes physical or psychological harm, humiliation or arbitrary deprivation of liberty and that perpetuates female subordination. Most commonly, violence against women is by intimate male partners. While gender equality is ranked fairly well in Sri Lanka, violence against women is still a prevalent issue in Sri Lanka. This is mainly due to the lack of studies conducted and data available in this region on this subject. Historically, there has been greater instances of gender violence occurring throughout the aftermath of natural disasters of civil strife.

One of the most internationally visible examples of gender-based violence involving Sri Lanka was the 2007 sexual abuse scandal in Haiti. A number of Sri Lankan peacekeeping contingent committed various offenses of sexual misconduct during the United Nations Stabilisation Mission in Haiti. 108 members, including 3 officers of the 950-member Sri Lanka peacekeeping contingent, was sent back after being implicated in alleged misconduct and sexual abuse. After inquiry into the case the UN Office of Internal Oversight Services (OIOS) concluded, "acts of sexual exploitation and abuse (against children) were frequent and occurred usually at night, and at virtually every location where the contingent personnel were deployed." The OIOS is assisting in the pending legal proceedings initiated by the Sri Lankan Government and has said charges should include statutory rape "because it involves children under 18 years of age". In 2016, the Sri Lankan government decided to make a one-time ex-gratia payment to a victim and child born as a result of sexual exploitation and abuse, which was praised by the UN.

=== Reproductive rights ===
Being aware of reproductive rights is an integral part of women and girls being liberated from the binds of an unequal society. The ability to exercise their reproductive rights is an ability closely tied to the capability of utilizing economic and political rights. In most cases, it is the male heads of household who are in control of how many children the family has and when the wife has more children.

Having effective contraceptives is inherently tied to having adequate health care services. Specifically, studies have shown that while health care is generally available for most of the Sri Lankan population, it is not well-geared towards providing for the reproductive rights of teenagers. This subsequently has been shown to impact the general confidence teens in Sri Lanka have about discussing sexual and reproductive rights and issues.

Generally, there is a strong debate regarding rights of abortion for women in Sri Lanka, as currently according to the Penal Code of Sri Lanka in 1995, there are laws banning abortion.

Additionally, reproductive rights is one issue that has been explored by widowed women and sex workers following civil and ethnic strife in Sri Lankan history. Specifically, because they become the heads of household, it is up to them to determine how they will make sexual and reproductive choices

== Political participation ==
While historically Sri Lanka has been very progressive when it comes to women's participation, there are still many gains they can make before they reach gender equality. Sri Lanka prides itself in having an elected the first female prime minister in the world, Sirimavo Bandaranaike, in 1960. She was elected following the assassination of her husband.

Even while a greater number of women are holding positions of power today, women in general are still strongly associated with the domestic sphere.

== See also ==
- Gender roles in Sri Lanka
