= Gender roles in Sri Lanka =

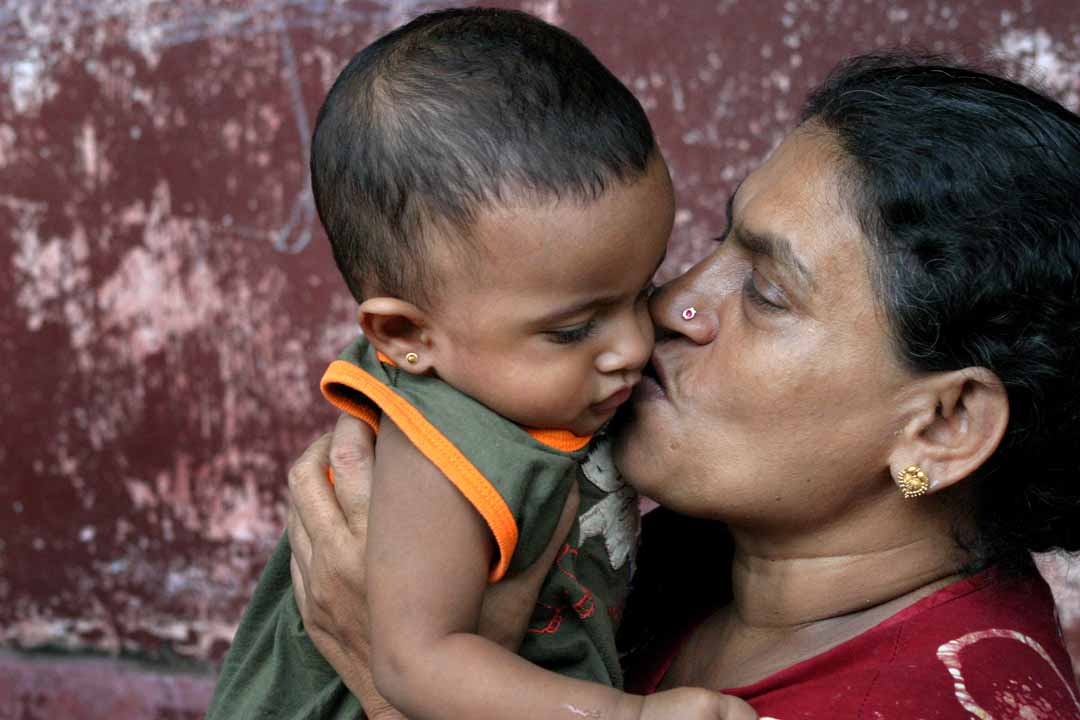
- Sri Lankan woman and child

Global Gender Gap Index
- Value: 0.670 (2021)
- Rank: 116th out of 156

All ethnic groups in Sri Lanka have clear distinctions regarding the roles of the sexes. Sri Lanka was the first nation in the world to elect a female head of government, Sirimavo Bandaranaike. Bandaranaike won the election in 1960 after S.W.R.D. Bandaranaike, the preceding leader who was also her husband, was murdered by a spy.

While Sri Lanka relatively excels when it comes to gender equality indices, there are still many underlying issues pertaining to gender inequality in Sri Lanka.

Generally speaking, women in Sri Lanka are responsible for cooking, raising children, and taking care of housework. In families relying on agriculture, women are in charge of weeding and help with the harvest. Among poor families, women also perform full-time work for upper class individuals. Moreover, the man's role used to be seen as providing his family with material support by looking after his business.

At the center of the hierarchy are children, who mix freely and receive a great deal of affection from both sexes. Among the middle- and upper-income classes, education of children may last into their early twenties, and women may mix with males or even take on jobs that were in the past reserved for men.

== Gender inequality ==
In comparison to other countries in the region, Sri Lanka is ranked well on several gender equality indices. However, there are also some sources that question the validity of these indices. Furthermore, globally, Sri Lanka ranks relatively low on gender equality indices. Overall, this pattern of social history that disempowers females produces a cycle of undervaluing females, providing only secondary access to health care and schooling and thus less opportunities to take on high-level jobs or training. In a study by Dr. Elaine Enarson, this cycle in turn worsens the issue of low political participation and social rights.

== See also ==
- Women in Asia
