= Roopa-Lekha =

Indian art magazine

Roopa-Lekha is an Indian art magazine published by the All India Fine Arts and Crafts Society (AIFACS) since 1928. Around 63 volumes have been published. Originally published quarterly, it was later published biannually. Its editorial board consisted of Ananda K. Coomaraswamy, James H. Cousins, Ajit Ghose, Karl Khandalvala, G. Venkatachalam and Barada Ukil. It is one of the longest-running Indian art magazines, with it covering a diversity of styles and topics related to regional schools, exhibitions, sculpture, crafts, architecture, and contemporary painting.

== See also ==
- Marg (magazine)
