= George E. de Silva =

Ceylonese lawyer and politician

Hon. George E. de Silva
- ජෝර්ජ් ඊ. ද සිල්වා
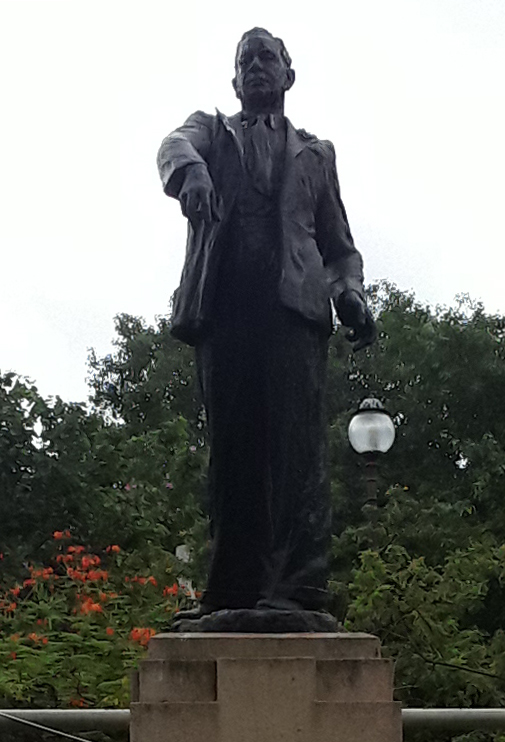
- George E. de Silva Statue at Kandy.

Minister of Industries, Industrial Research and Fisheries
- In office 26 September 1947 – 1948
- Prime Minister: D. S. Senanayake
- Preceded by: Office created
- Succeeded by: G. G. Ponnambalam

Member of the Ceylon Parliament for Kandy
- In office 1947–1949
- Preceded by: Constituency created
- Succeeded by: Tamara Kumari Ilangaratne

Personal details
- Born: George Edmund de Silva; 8 June 1879 Ceylon
- Died: 12 March 1950 (aged 70) Ceylon
- Party: United National Party
- Spouse: Agnes Marion Nell
- Children: Fredrick, Minnette, Anil
- Occupation: journalist, lawyer, politician
- Profession: Proctor

George Edmund de Silva (Sinhala ජෝර්ජ් ඊ. ද සිල්වා; 8 June 1879 - 12 March 1950) was a Ceylonese lawyer and politician. He was the first Cabinet Minister of Industries, Industrial Research and Fisheries in independent Sri Lanka (then Ceylon) (1947–1948), a Member of Parliament and State Council.

== Early life and legal career ==
He was born at Matara to Weeradivakara Muhandieamage Cornelis de Silva, a rural ayurvedic physician. George de Silva initially worked as a reporter for the Ceylon Independent and ran a vegetable stall to make ends meet. Later he became a staff journalist of The Times of Ceylon. He studied at the Lorensz Tutory in Colombo, entered Ceylon Law College and passed his proctors' final exam in 1907 becoming a proctor. Moving to Kandy, de Silva established a lucrative legal practice in criminal law in the unofficial bar which was at the time dominated by Burger proctors. He established his legal firm De Silva & Karunaratne. His brothers Timothy and Gregory too became proctors.

== Political career ==
In 1915, de Silva and E. W. Perera carried a secret memorandum initiated and drafted by Sir James Peiris to the Secretary of State for the Colonies, pleading for the repeal of martial law and vindication of the reputations of those who had been falsely accused during the riots of 1915.

=== Legislative Council and Kandy Municipal Council ===
He was elected as an unofficial member of the Legislative Council of Ceylon in the 1921 Ceylonese Legislative Council election, re-elected in the 1924 Ceylonese Legislative Council election for the Central Province (Rural) seat and was elected to the Kandy Municipal Council in 1930 and served till 1947, during which time he introduced several municipal reforms including the slum clearance scheme and the Peradeniya river pumping scheme. In 1929 he was elected the President of the Ceylon National Congress.

=== State Council and Minister of Health ===
He was elected to the State Council of Ceylon from Kandy in the 1931 Ceylonese State Council election. Having been re-elected in the 1936 Ceylonese State Council election from Kandy, he was appointed Minister of Health in 1942 and served till 1947. During his tenure, he focused on establishing 250 rural hospitals and started the DDT campaign to control the Malaria epidemic. In 1943 he was elected the President of the Ceylon National Congress. As the member of the State Council for Kandy, he campaigned for the return of the throne and the crown of the Kingdom of Kandy that was taken to Great Britain. The campaign was successful and these returned and were used as the crown jewels of the Monarch of Ceylon. He successfully campaigned for the release of the Royal Palace of Kandy from its use as the residency of the Government Agent, Kandy with E. T. Dyson becoming the last to reside at the Palace. In June 1946, he was appointed Justice of the Peace for the Colombo District by the Governor of Ceylon on the occasion of the King's birthday.

=== Parliament and Minister for Industries ===
With Ceylon gaining independence, de Silva was elected to the seat of Kandy, at the 1st parliamentary election from the United National Party, held between 23 August and 20 September 1947, and appointed to D. S. Senanayake's cabinet as the first Minister for Industries and Fisheries. He lost his seat in parliament in 1948, following an election petition filled by his opponent T.B. Illangaratne which found him guilty and deprived him of his civic rights.

== Personal life ==
He married Agnes Marion Nell in 1909 at St. Paul's Church, Kandy. The marriage was discouraged by the Nell family, with the vicar refusing to preside over their marriage ceremony. They had three children, two daughters and a son. The eldest was Anil de Silva, a journalist. Second was Fredrick de Silva, MBE who succeeded his father on the Kandy Municipal Council, becoming the Mayor of Kandy, Member of Parliament and Sri Lanka's Ambassador in France. His grandson, Sir Desmond de Silva, was the United Nations Chief War Crimes Prosecutor in Sierra Leone and husband of Princess Katarina of Yugoslavia. Their youngest child was Minnette de Silva the first Asian woman to qualify as an architect with the Royal Institute of British Architects. She worked on early experiments of tropical modernism in Sri Lanka. He is also grand-uncle to journalist Lasantha Wickrematunge.

The home of de Silva in Kandy hosted many celebrities during the golden age in Hollywood, including Vivian Leigh, Peter Finch, Sir Laurence Olivier, David Lean, William Holden, Gregory Peck, Sir Alec Guinness, Mahatma Gandhi, Nehru Gandhi, and Indira Gandhi.

He died on 12 March 1950, having suffered a stroke which was followed by two heart attacks while playing at the Peradeniya golf course.
