= Women's suffrage in Sri Lanka =

Women in Sri Lanka have had suffrage since 1931.

Agnes De Silva was secretary of the Ceylon Women's Franchise Union, which had been founded in 1927, and a prominent activist for women's suffrage. She led an organized delegation of women members of the Franchise Union to present their case at the 1928 Donoughmare Commission on Constitutional Reform which the British Government then in control of the island had constituted. They advocated for suffrage to be granted to women thirty years of age and older. The reforms she introduced later became a part of new constitution established in 1931. After the new constitution came into force the adult franchise was extended to women above the age of 21, regardless of their educational status.

The subsection 12.(1) of the Sri Lankan constitution guarantees equality before the law and equal protection of the law to all citizens. Subsection 12.(2) further states that "no citizen shall be discriminated against on the grounds of race, religion, language, caste, sex, political opinion [or] place of birth ..." (Cooray Sept. 1989, 12).
