= Anil de Silva =

- Born: Anil de Silva; 1909; Kandy, Sri Lanka
- Died: 1996 (aged 86–87); Cambridge, England
- Other names: Anil (Marcia) de Silva-Vigier
- Occupations: Journalist and author
- Years active: 1946 to 1996
- Known for: The Life of the Buddha Through Painting and Sculpture (1955); Chinese Landscape Painting in the Caves of Tunhuang (1964), and a chapter in The Cave temples of Maichisan and an account of the 1958 expedition to Maichisan (1969).
- Notable work: Series on Man Through Her Art for UNESCO
- Spouses: Robert Nichol-Cadell; P. Vigier

Anil de Silva (1909–1996), known as Anil (Marcia) de Silva-Vigier, was a Sri Lankan journalist, political activist, author, art critic, and art historian. She worked for Marg, a quarterly Indian journal on traditional and modern art, and was co-editor of the children's magazine Toycart. She founded the Indian People's Theatre Association, was associated with the Indian Communist party, and was considered Bombay's avant-garde. In 1958 she launched an expedition to China to study cave paintings. She published several books, of which the most prominent were: The Life of the Buddha Through Painting and Sculpture (1955), The Art of Chinese Landscape Painting: In the Caves of Tun-huang (original edition 1964, translated in English in 1967), (1964) and This Moste Highe Prince: John of Gaunt, 1340-1399. She also co-edited a series on "Man Through His Art" for UNESCO.

== Biography ==
Anil de Silva was born in Kandy, Sri Lanka, in 1909. Her father, George E. de Silva, was a Sinhalese Buddhist who became a politician, was President of the Ceylon National Congress, and also served as a Minister of Health. Her mother, Agnes Nell, was a Burgher Christian who actively campaigned for universal suffrage in Sri Lanka and succeeded in getting it in 1931 with the enactment of the Constitution which extended suffrage to all women over 21. Her sister Minnette de Silva was the well-known first woman architect of Sri Lanka.

After her marriage to Robert Nichol-Cadell, she resided in England from 1933 to 1938. However, this marriage did not last and she moved to Bangalore and from there to Bombay, where she joined her sister Minnette who was pursuing studies in architecture at the Bombay School of Architecture, where she was the first female student. While in Bombay, de Silva was one of the founders of the Indian People's Theatre Association. While in Bombay, her friend Mulk Raj Anand, a writer and member of the Progressive Writers' Movement, an art historian and member of the Communist Party of India, offered her the post of assistant editor of his journal, Marg, which covered traditional and modern art and architecture. She was assistant editor of Marg from 1946 to 1948. In January 1947 Marg published an exclusive edition covering the heritage of Sri Lanka, its arts, culture and life. Through Marg, de Silva became associated with the promotion of modern art and held many art exhibitions; one such exhibition was of George Keyt in India. With Pupul Jayakar, she co-edited the children's magazine Toycart.

In the 1940s she was associated with the Indian Communist Party and was considered Bombay's avant-garde. She was one of the "principal ideologues and organizers" of the communist movement in Bombay. In 1945 she authored a book titled Chinese Women and Freedom (Kutub Publishers, 1945). She was involved in translating to English a book on Collection of stories by Ding Ling.

In 1949 she left her job in Bombay and moved to Paris, where she married a Frenchman. In Paris, she studied at the Louvre for a course in art history, the first Asian to do so. In Paris, studying the arts exhibited in the museums, particularly at the Musee Guimet, she learned to appreciate Asian art heritage. This later inspired her to write and publish The Life of the Buddha Retold From Ancient Sources in 1955, a book which incorporated illustrations of as many as 160 art works from various parts of Asia. In 1956 she presented a television programme on the BBC titled "Asian Club".

In 1958 de Silva planned an all-woman expedition to China, which at the time did not allow people from the West to visit, to study the cave paintings in Dunhuang (Tun-huang) and Maijishan (Maichisan) in Gansu province. Her team was composed of Romila Thapar as research assistant, Dominique Darbois as photographer, and Mingo Wong, a Chinese woman translator. The team studied 469 caves. Their two books based on their research focused on China's Buddhist heritage at a time when British imperialism and Christianity were prevalent in the country. De Silva's visit to China was facilitated at the intervention of her friend S.K.Panikkar, a historian from Kerala who was Ambassador of India in Paris and who was a friend of Zhou Enlai, the then Prime Minister of China. UNESCO assigned de Silva the task of co-editing a series on Man Through His Art.

In the 1960s de Silva moved permanently to her cottage in Cambridge, England. While on retirement, at 83 years of age she wrote and published the book This Moste Highe Prince: John of Gaunt, 1340-1399, related to the son of Edward III, father of Henry IV. At age 85, she wrote a book on Christine de Pizan, a 15th-century author. She died in November 1996, aged 87.

== Publications ==
De Silva published many articles in Marg and also many books on art heritage related to Buddhist art. One of her well-known books is Chinese landscape Painting in the Caves of Tunhuang (1964). She wrote a small chapter based on her expedition team to China in the book The Cave Temples of Maichisan: An account of the 1958 expedition to Maichisan (1969).
