= Agnes de Silva =

Sri Lankan social activist

- Born: Agnes Marion Nell; 1885; Colombo, Sri Lanka
- Died: 1961 (aged 75–76); Kandy
- Occupation: Movement for adult suffrage for women
- Known for: Women’s Franchise Union of Sri Lanka.
- Spouse: George E. de Silva
- Children: Anil de Silva; Minnette de Silva; Fredrick de Silva
- Relatives: Paul Nell (father); Andreas Nell (brother)

Agnes Marion de Silva (née Nell; 1885-1961) was a Sri Lankan women's activist from a progressive society who, during the 1930s, pioneered issues related to women and in particular adult suffrage or franchise for women in Sri Lanka. She was instrumental in establishing the Women’s Franchise Union of Sri Lanka.

== Biography ==
Agnes Marion Nell was born in Colombo on 1885. She was the only daughter of Paul Nell of a Burgher Christian aristocratic family, who was an engineer in the Kandy province. She married George de Silva, a Sinhala Buddhist, a lawyer by profession who was known for his liberal approach in social and political issues and who furthered the cause of women's suffrage. He wooed Agnes in many parties of dance and music and married her in a grand celebration in 1908. They had two daughters Anil de Silva and Minnette de Silva and a son Fredrick de Silva.

In promoting women's suffrage movement in the then British ruled Ceylon (now known, after independence, as Sri Lanka) de Silva functioned as secretary of the Women's Franchise Union which was established in 1927 by socially upscale women who also pursued career oriented professions. At that time her aunt Winfred Nell was a leading medical doctor. She pursued activism to get franchise rights for women, lead an organized a delegation of women members of the Franchise Union to present their case at the 1928 Donoughmare Commission on Constitutional Reform which the then British Government had constituted. Agnes had testified before the Commission that Indian Tamil women in Sri Lanka also should have the right to vote. Initially the Commission had agreed to grant franchise to women who were above thirty years of age. She again visited Britain with her husband to present the case of Sri Lanka not only for suffrage but also for other reforms. The reforms which were accepted became a part of a new constitution that came into effect in 1931. After the new constitution came into force the adult franchise was extended to women above the age of 21, to vote irrespective of their educational status.

She then contested general election, representing the Labour Party from the Galagedara constituency on the issue of universal suffrage but failed to get elected. She was a member of the Executive Committee of the Labour Party. She and her husband worked for Sri Lankan independence from British rule, which came into effect in 1948.
