= Kandyan Art Association =

Arts and crafts association located in Sri Lanka

Kandy Art Association
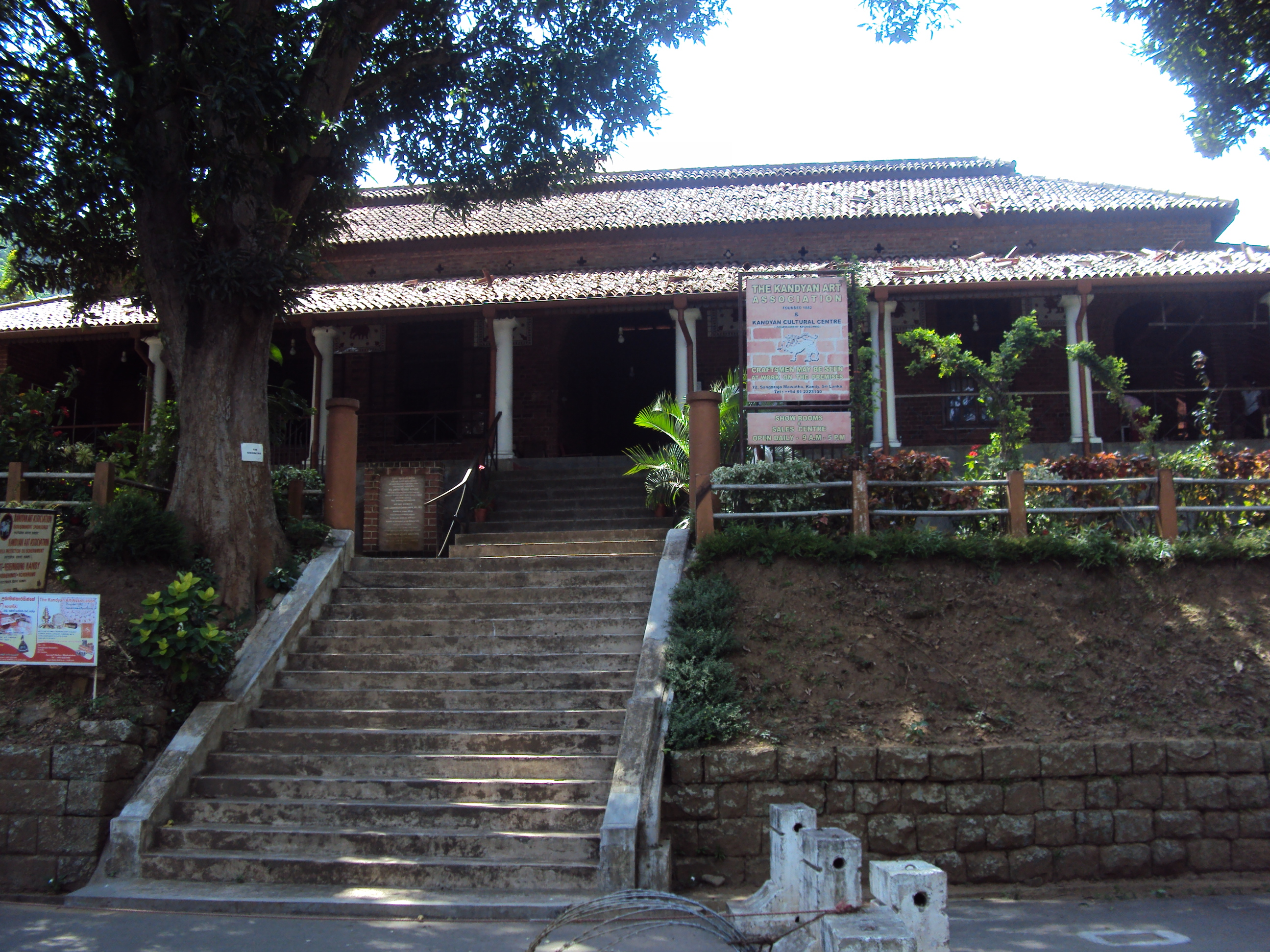
- Entrance to Kandyan Arts Association building
- Formation: 1882; 144 years ago
- Founder: John Frederick Dickson
- Type: Public trust
- Headquarters: 72 Sangaraja Mawatha
- Location: Kandy, Sri Lanka
- Coordinates: 7°17′31.6″N 80°38′32.59″E
- Manager: Chitra Dissanayake
- Website: kandyarts.com

Kandyan Art Association is an association formed in 1882 to revitalise traditional Kandyan arts and crafts (such as weaving, wood carving, painting, jewelry making, music and dance) and support the traditional craftsmen by providing them a sales outlet.

Artists and craftsmen in the Kingdom of Kandy were well organised into guilds, with knowledge and skills passed down from generation to generation. Even marriages were within the same group so that the craft was closely guarded. These guilds all operated under the patronage of the king. When the kingdom was absorbed into the British Empire as a protectorate, following the Kandyan Convention of 1815, without a royal household most of these artists and craftsmen lost their livelihood and the guilds were disbanded, with only a few families continuing their crafts.

== History ==
The association was established in 1882 by the British Government agent for the Central Province, Sir John Frederick Dickson, who brought together the traditional artists and the craftsmen in the Central Province. Initially it operated from a small room in the Government Agent's Office. In 1904 the Association moved to the building known as the Palle Vahala (Lower Palace), the palace where the king's spouse and children resided. The building now houses the National Museum of Kandy.

In 1919 the association was incorporated as a public trust, and is now administered by the Government Agent of Kandy District and a management committee.

In 1924 the association was relocated to its present location, the former Kunam Maduwa (House of the Palanquins), which housed the palanquins used by the Kandyan royal court. The Kunam Maduwa was built by King Vimaladharmasuriya in the 16th century. In 1876 the building was converted and used by the British as a military hospital.

In 1982 the association undertook a significant expansion, in conjunction with the organisation's centenary, constructing a new cultural centre and theatre adjoining the existing heritage building. The project was designed by Minnette de Silva, the first Sri Lankan female architect. The building was completed in August 1984, with a central theatre complex that seats 1,500 people, galleries and studio spaces. The theatre was extensively damaged by the 1998 bombing of the Temple of the Tooth by the Liberation Tigers of Tamil Eelam. In 2005 the government, through the efforts of Lakshman Kadirgamar (National List MP and Minister of Foreign Affairs), provided 7 million LKR to restore and enhance the building complex.

== Performances ==
The Association organises a daily one hour traditional Kandyan dance and music performance showcase in the building's auditorium. These dances are performed by local families and products of the country's dancing institutions. The sales centre displays and sells handicrafts obtained from traditional crafts people who are members of the association.
