= Mary Rutnam =

Canadian doctor, gynecologist, and suffragist

- Born: Mary Helen Irwin; 2 June 1873; Elora, Ontario, Canada
- Died: 1962 (aged 88–89)
- Monuments: Women and children's waiting room at the Lady Ridgeway Hospital for Children in Colombo
- Education: Women's Medical College, Trinity College, Toronto
- Occupations: Doctor, gynaecologist, suffragist, social worker
- Organization(s): Girls' Friendly Society; Ceylon Women's Union; Girl Guides, All-Ceylon Women's Conference
- Spouse: Samuel Christmas Kanaga Rutnam
- Awards: Ramon Magsaysay Award, 1958

Mary Helen Rutnam (née Irwin; 2 June 1873 – 1962) was a Canadian doctor, gynaecologist, suffragist, and pioneer of women's rights in Sri Lanka. She became nationally recognised for her work in women's health and health education, birth control, prisoners' rights, and the temperance movement.

== Early life and education ==
Mary Helen Irwin was born on 2 June 1873 in Elora, Ontario, Canada. Her family were Presbyterian. She attended school in Kincardine, and qualified as a doctor at the Women's Medical College at Trinity College, Toronto. Following graduation, she applied to undertake missionary work in Asia for the American Board of Commissioners for Foreign Missions, completing training in New York in 1896. While there, she met and married Samuel Christmas Kanaga Rutnam.

== Work ==
Having completed her preparatory training, Rutnam arrived in Sri Lanka (the British colony of Ceylon) to begin work at the McCleod Hospital for Women in Inuvil. However, her marriage to Samuel Rutnam, a Tamil, was disapproved of, and she was ostracized by her fellow missionaries. Instead, she worked briefly in a hospital in Colombo, the Lady Havelock Hospital for Women, before opening her own gynaecological practice there. This was particularly popular with Muslim women, and others, who would have avoided seeing a male doctor.

From 1904, Rutnam collaborated with a fellow Canadian doctor in establishing the Girls' Friendly Society and the Ceylon Women's Union, both intended to improve the health and social provisions for local women and girls. They dispensed advice, facilitated discussion on women's rights, and provided access to books. Inspired by the development of various women's organisations on a visit to Canada in 1907–8, back in Colombo Rutnam encouraged the establishment of the Tamil Women's Union. This non-denominational organisation centred on cultural and educational work, including the promotion of traditional Tamil culture and the provision of schooling.

In 1922, Rutnam was responsible for the introduction of the Girl Guide movement to Ceylon, and during the 1920s she took an ever-greater role in the suffrage campaign. To this end, she was primarily involved with the Women's Franchise Union which, when women gained the vote in 1931, became the Women's Political Union, with Rutnam as its inaugural president. The group continued to work for widespread democratic rights for women. From 1931, she also began to a network of women's institutes (the Ceylon Women's Society, or Lanka Mahila Samiti), which focused on working with the rural poor, including offering instruction in health care, handicrafts, literacy, and cookery.

From 1932, Rutnam began to advocate greater promotion of family planning, worried by the undernourished babies she saw at the Ceylon Social Service League. Ceylon's Medical Council rejected her suggestion to include principles of family planning in Ceylon Medical School's curriculum, and five years later - in 1937 - Rutnam opened her own family planning clinic in Colombo, the country's first. The same year, she won a seat on the municipal council of Bambalapitiya, the first woman to do so, and oversaw 'sanitation projects, urban renewal, and local poor relief'. However, critics of her birth control advocacy saw her removed from the role just a year later.

In 1944, Rutnam was a co-founder of the All-Ceylon Women's Conference, which had taken over the work of the Ceylon Women's Society. Her social work and concerns widened further still, including the rights of female factory workers, women prisoners, adult education, the dowry system, and childcare provision for working mothers.

== Writing and lecturing ==
Rutnam wrote, lectured, and published extensively on the social and medical issues she cared about. As well as articles in newspapers, Rutnam published two textbooks: A Health Manual for Schools (1923) and the Homecraft Manual for Ceylon Schools (1933). This latter included a call for young women to carry out social work, as well as decrying issues like the use and treatment of children as servants. She championed sex education, women's suffrage, and improved nutrition, spearheading a campaign to tackle the prevalence of rickets among children.

== Recognition ==
In 1949, on her 76th birthday, Rutnam was celebrated widely for her tireless work in social welfare.

In 1958, she won the Ramon Magsaysay Foundation award for Public Service for her humanitarian and social work. Rutnam was praised for having

for 62 years applied her heart, her mind and her medical knowledge with insight and understanding to the problems of the Ceylonese people, whom she has made her own.

Among the major contributions noted was the introduction of women's institutes (the Lanka Mahila Samiti) to Ceylon, which had 'done much to alter the status of village women'. Rutnam:

labored particularly to enhance the self-respect of the less fortunate by showing them practical ways to improve their lot. At the same time, she has helped the more fortunate to recognize that it is their social responsibility and, indeed, their privilege to help their fellowmen.

== Death and legacy ==
Dr. Mary Rutnam died in 1962. Following her death, a memorial was created for her in the form of a women and children's waiting room at the Lady Ridgeway Hospital for Children in Colombo.

In 1993, Dr. Kumari Jayawardena published a book about Rutnam entitled A Canadian Pioneer for Women's Rights in Sri Lanka.
