= Segar (artist) =

Sri Lankan artist and sculptor

Raja Segar
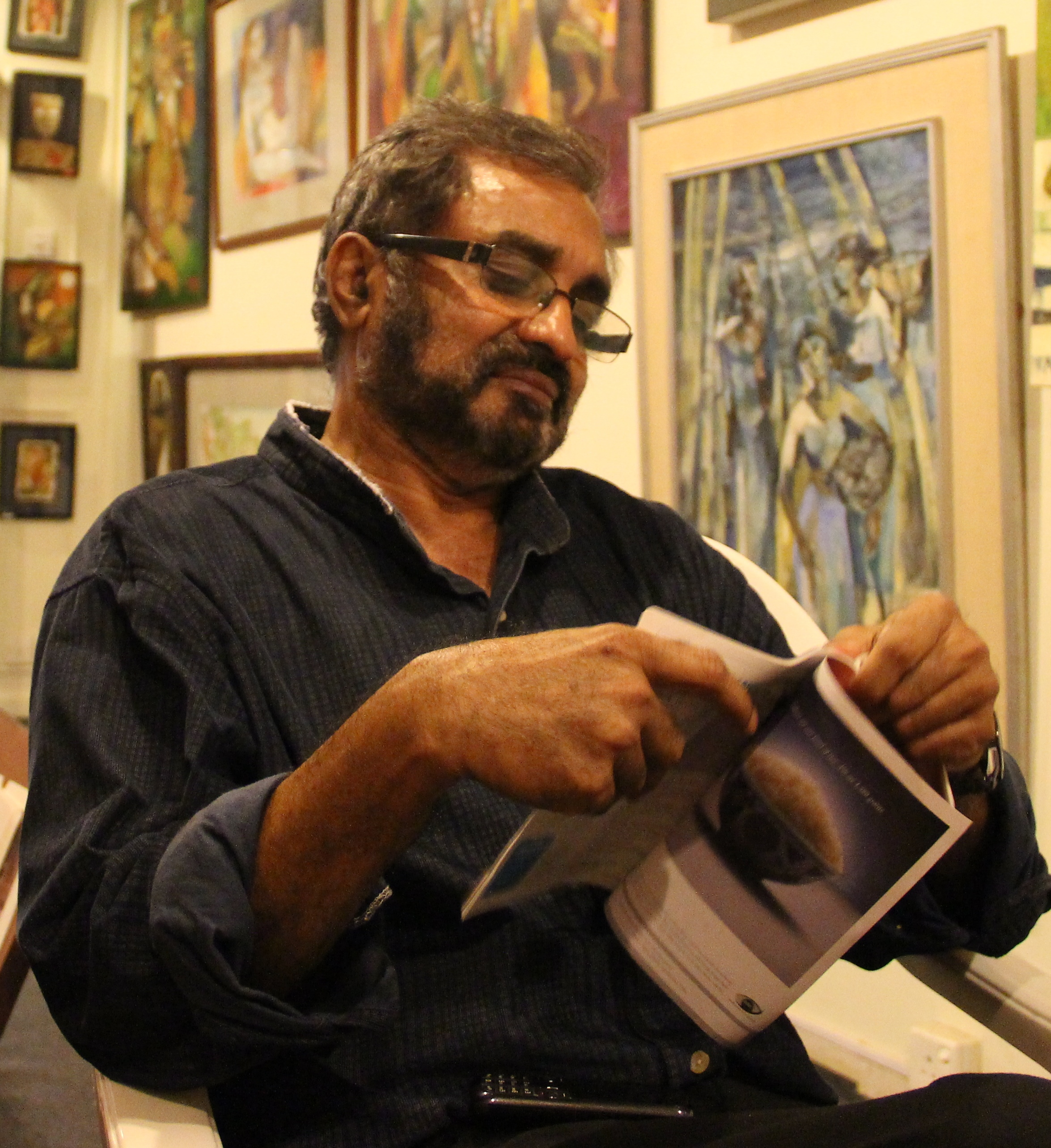
- Segar in 2013
- Born: 4 December 1951 (age 74); Colombo, Sri Lanka
- Occupations: Artist, Sculptor, and speaks English, German, Sinhalese, and Tamil
- Years active: 1979–present
- Style: Refractive effect in paintings
- Spouse(s): Wijeyashanthinie(1966-1996)
- Children: Spinndonna (born 1992); Donnavann (born 1994)

Signature
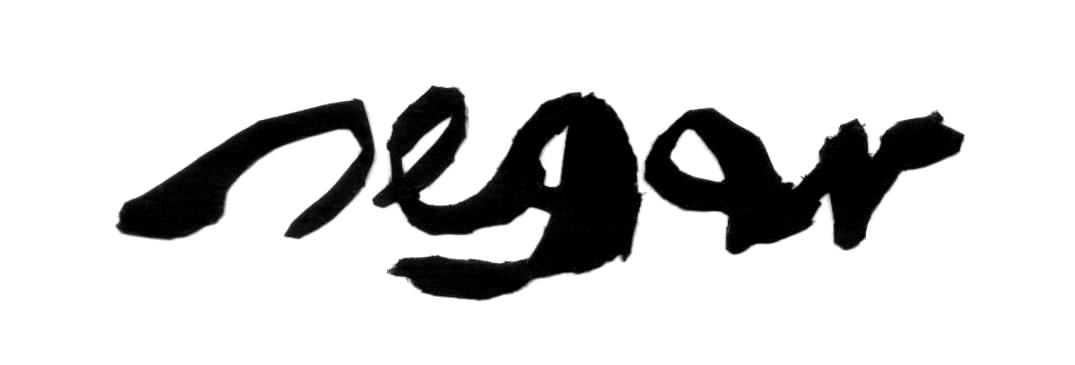

D. Raja Segar (born December 4, 1951) known as Segar, is a Sri Lankan artist and sculptor. He primarily does figure painting, with an interest in religious figures, such as Buddha and Ganesha, and everyday South Asian life. He describes his style as "refractive".

== Early life ==
Segar was born to poor parents in the suburb of Colombo, the capital of Sri Lanka. He used to walk to school which was 5 km away from home to save bus fare so that he could eat something during the interval. After schooling at St Michael's College, Polwatte, Colombo-3 at the age of 19, he started working in a soft drinks manufacturing company in the field of accountancy.

While studying for his accountancy examinations he spent most of his time in the reference sections of the British Council library in Colombo. There he was able to browse through a collection of books and periodicals on art and artists. In his news paper interviews he always states; British Council was my university of fine art.

== Career ==
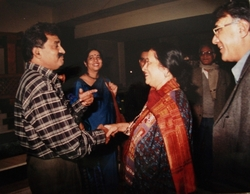
Segar with Anjolie Ela Menon in New Delhi, 2003

Monotonous work in the accountancy department started to bore him. Segar started to design his own greeting cards purely based on the day to day lifestyle of Sri Lankans. His cards became an instant hit as most of the greeting cards in Sri Lanka were copied from the paintings of western countries. The art lovers who saw his cards wanted him to make large paintings. Hence, comfortably he became a painter.

To give his art a serious impact Segar started experimenting the refractive effect of light in his abstract and figurative cubism. Tangent in geometry played a part in his drawings. His overlapping figures in his paintings was influenced by the Venn diagrams in Statistics. He loves to work in watercolor, oil and mixed media. In sculpture he works in steel. He has had one man exhibitions in Australia, England, India and Sri Lanka in addition to group exhibitions. Though his paintings sometimes depict gods and religion, he remains an atheist. His art has appeared in newspapers, documentaries and periodicals including Reader's Digest.

In 1988 he attempted suicide as a result of failed love affair but changed the idea as he thought of more than 20 of his unsigned paintings.

In 1996, Segar had his 19th solo exhibition in Colombo and donated the sales proceed of more than US$5000 to the Neurosurgery Trust Fund of the National Hospital of Sri Lanka, in the year which his wife of 29 years, Vejeyashanthinie, died of brain stem cancer.

The Housing Scheme 1977 and The Buddha 1987 are the two famous paintings in his career.

In 2002, he represented Sri Lanka at the South Asian Association for Regional Cooperation artist meet up in Delhi.

Segar participated in the Abu Dhabi Cultural Summit in April 2017.

== Personal life ==
Segar was born to Hindu parents in Colombo Sri Lanka. His parents became Christians of catholic denomination after 3 years of their marriage, for the simple reason of getting Christian Schools for their Children. This was rather a common practice in Sri Lanka. Segar had to go to Sunday school in Anthony's Church Kollupitiya, in addition to going to church every Sundays. Until he was 13 he never missed a Sunday mass as he was told by the church that he would go to hell if he stop going to church and heaven is only possible only if he believes Jesus Christ as his only god. Segar noticed that hardly anyone read the Bible in his environment, may be reading the Bible was restricted among Catholics. Curious Segar started to read the Bible secretly. He read it again and he stopped going to Church ever since. When the congregation asked him he answered; It takes more than 8 minutes for the sun light to reach earth. Our next sun (star) is more than 4 light years away. Pl show me where the heaven is. Further, I am not interested in going to place where you can not communicate with your loved ones. However Segar was fascinated by the stories in both the religions Hinduism and Christianity. Religions became great art objects for his paintings. Segar's paintings on Gods were greatly admired and several of his paintings on Hindu god Ganesha adorned the shrine rooms of posh Hindus in several countries.

He lives in a house architectured by Minnette De Silva. This house conceived from Segar's imagination when he was 12 years old.

== Exhibitions ==
Major International Exhibitions and Events

- 1988 Chetana Gallery Bombay - India
- 1990 Mosman Gallery, Sydney, Australia
- 1991 Gallery 202 London W11 - England
- 1992 The Fiveway Gallery, Paddington, Sydney, Australia
- 1994 Arteast Gallery. Vancouver BE Canada
- 2002 Art Exquisite Raffles hotel - Singapore
- 2002 SAARC Artist meet - New Delhi, India
- 2003 Jamaat Art Gallery – Mumbai, India
- 2004 Women on top 'Jamaat Art Gallery
- 2006 Lakshana Art Gallery, Chennai, India
- 2008 Delhi Diplomatic Art Circle, Delhi, India
- 2009 [M.F.Husain] Art Gallery, Delhi, India.
- 2010 Alankritha Art Gallery, Hyderabad, India.
- 2012 Bansiyog - Raasrang World Flute and art Festival 2012
- 2013 Gallery of Gnana Art, ION Orchard, Singapore
- 2014 Exhibition: The Global Icon, Singapore.
- 2017 Representing Sri Lanka in Culture Summit Abu Dhabi 2017 - International Leaders Summit Abu Dhabi.
- 2017 Representing Sri Lanka in 14th GIAF 2017 Gongju International Art Festival, Limlipartmuseum - Gongju, South Korea

One man exhibitions in Sri Lanka

- Lionel Wendt Art Gallery Colombo 1987 1988 1993 1996 1997 1999 2000
- British Council Colombo 1985
- Hotel Lanka Oberoi Colombo 1986
- Ramada Renaissance Colombo 1989 1991
- SAARC Exhibition of South Asian Paintings, National Art Gallery, Sri Lanka 1991
- Alliance Francaise 1984 1985 1991 1993 1995 2009
- National Art Gallery Colombo1992
- Gallery 706 Colombo 1994
- Segar Gallery web site inauguration 1998
- Sculptors and Painters presented by George Keyt Foundation, Colombo 2001
- Bishops College Auditorium, Colombo 2002 - United States
- Sri Lankan Painters presented by George Keyt Foundation, Colombo 2003
- Felix Gallery, Colombo, 2004
- Hermitage Gallery, Colombo, 2005
- American Center, USIS library, Colombo, 2008.
- Cinnamon Lakeside Hotel Gallery, 2009
- Horton Gardens Gallery, Colombo, 2011
- Exhibition and Autobiography Book release, Cinnamon Lakeside hotel, Colombo, (21 July 2013)
- May 2015 – The Beatles paintings accompanied by Royston Ellis poems, Colombo

== Geometry and Physics in Segar's work ==
His early works dominated by triangles squares and cubes and avoided curves much as possible refer the Big Ben painting on Bonjour French magazine. Traveling of light in different density and its refraction influenced him a lot. He did not hesitate to apply this in many of large canvases which resulted in figurative cubism and refractive effect in his paintings.

=== References on Raja Segar's art ===
- Tabrobane: Oct 1987, Sri Lanka
- George Keyt Foundation publication on SAARC artists 1991, Sri Lanka
- Explore Sri Lanka: Sep 1991 Nov 1999 and Sept 2004
- NORAD annual 1993
- Aruvi: Apr 1993
- Desathiya: Jan 1990
- Art line International: Sept 1991
- Aspects of culture in Sri Lanka by LeRoy Robinson 1992
- Reader's Digest: Feb 1998 Asian Edition
- Walk Along, collection of poems 2001
- Commemorative publication on art- 50th independence of Sri Lanka
- Autobiography with paintings July 2013, Coffee table book
- Online edition of Daily News - Lakehouse Newspapers
- Online edition of Daily News - Features

== Gallery ==
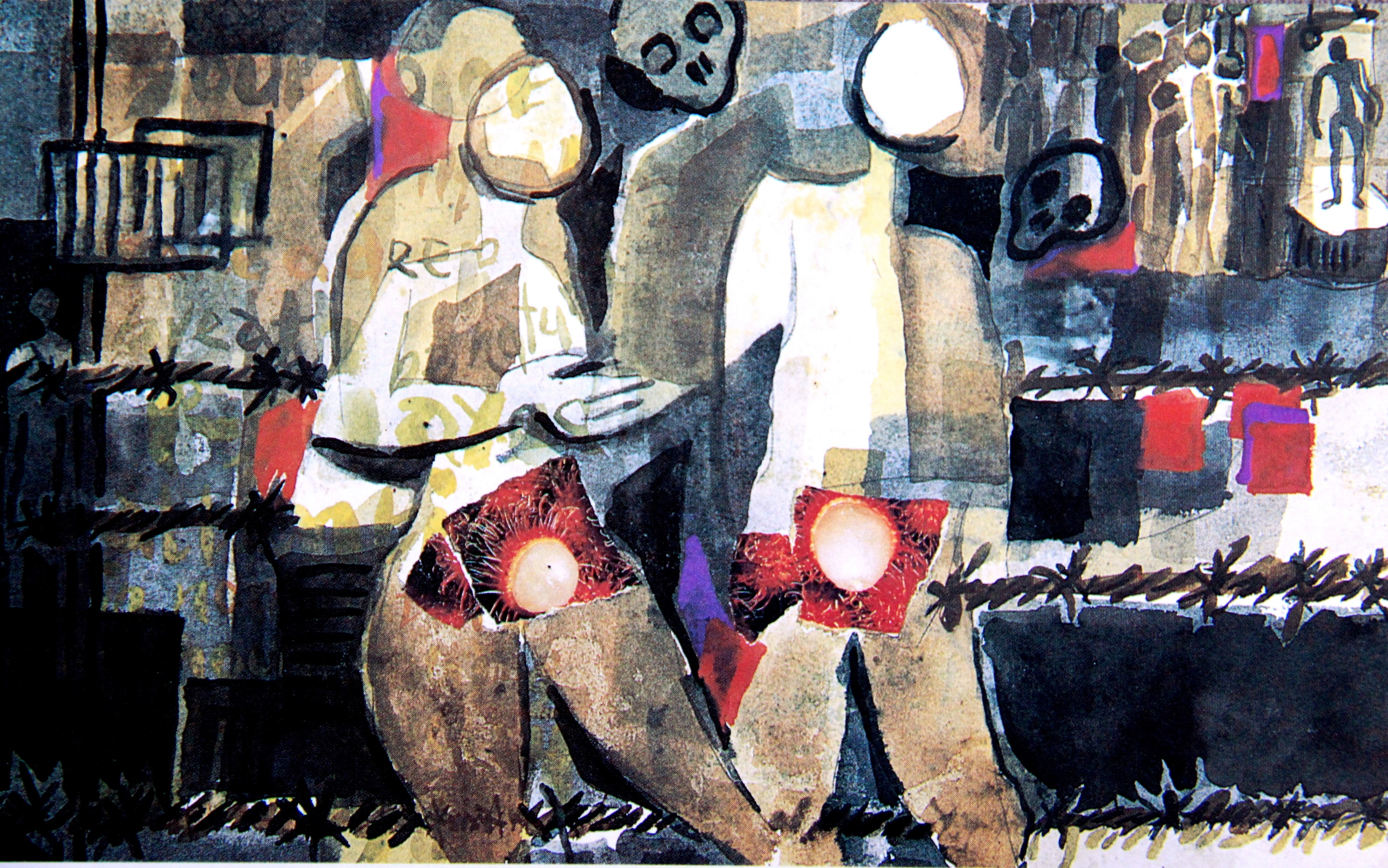
Concentration Camp, 1976
14x24 inch, mixed media collage
Commemorating 50th anniversary of Sri Lanka independence

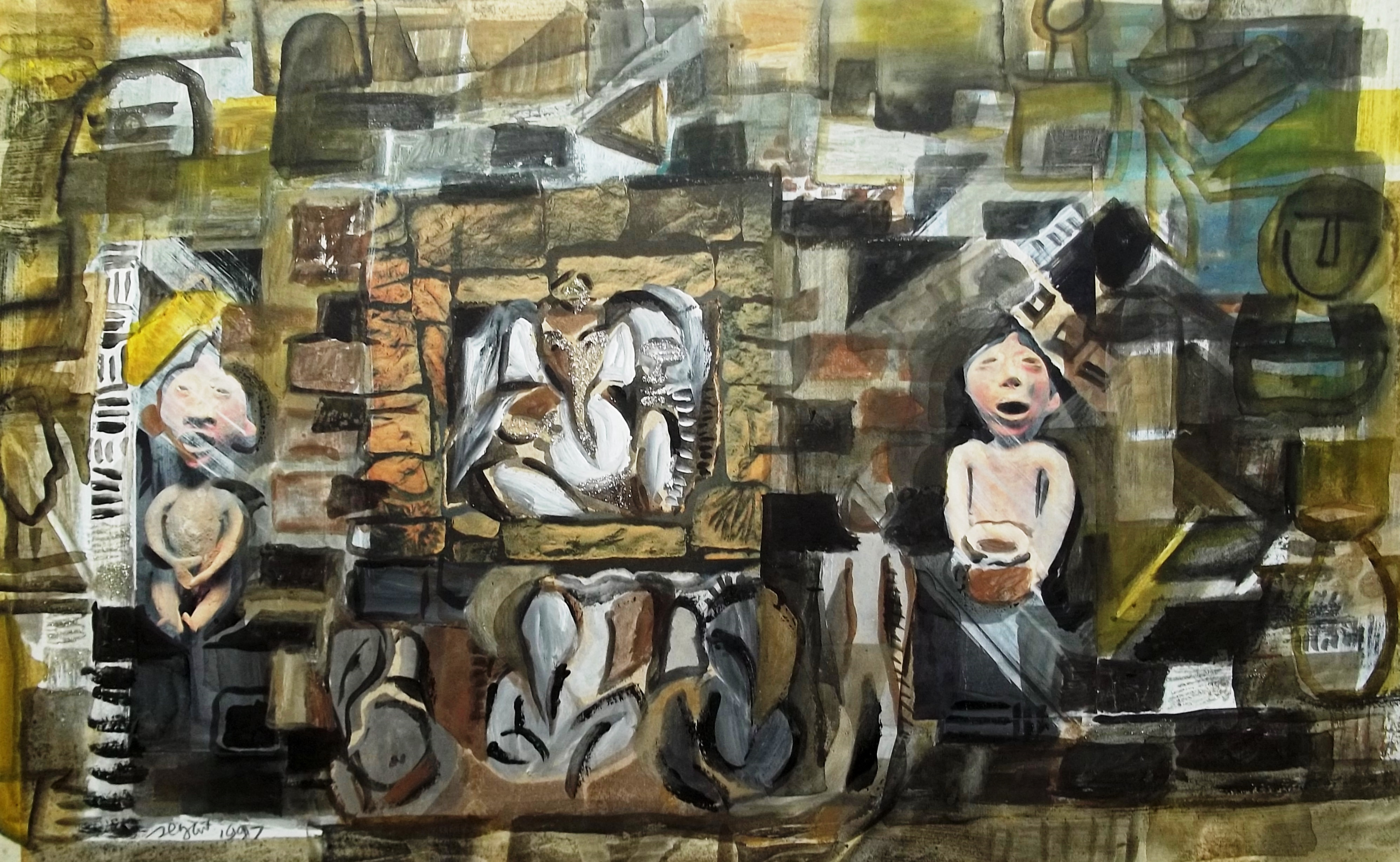
Excavation of Ganesha statute, 1997
16x24 inch mixed media on card board
Depicts a sculptor's workshop near Mamallapuram Temple in the southern part of Chennai of Tamil Nadu state in India.

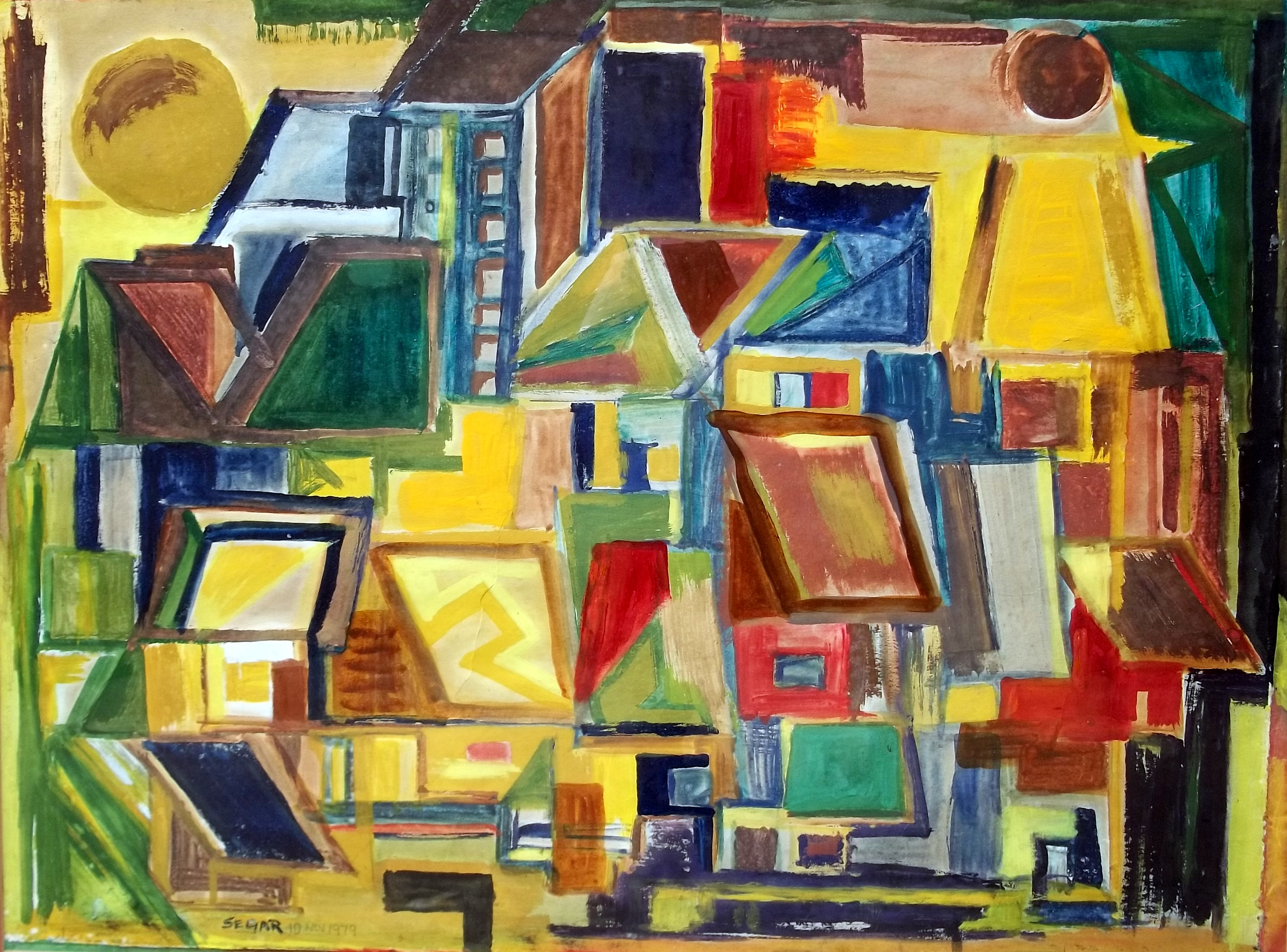
Housing Scheme or Maligawatte Flats, 1979
18x24 inch, mixed media

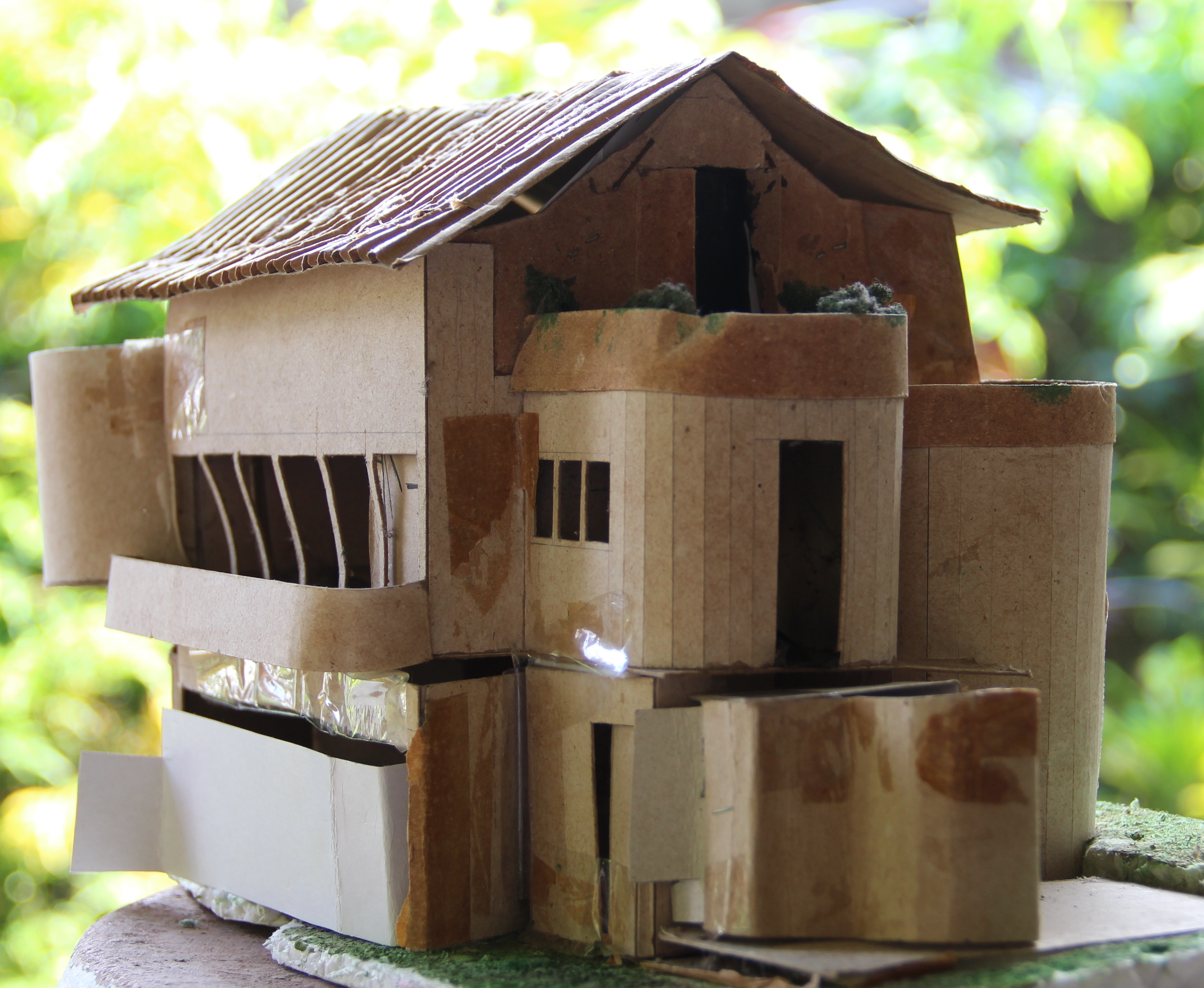
Minnette model for artist segar house

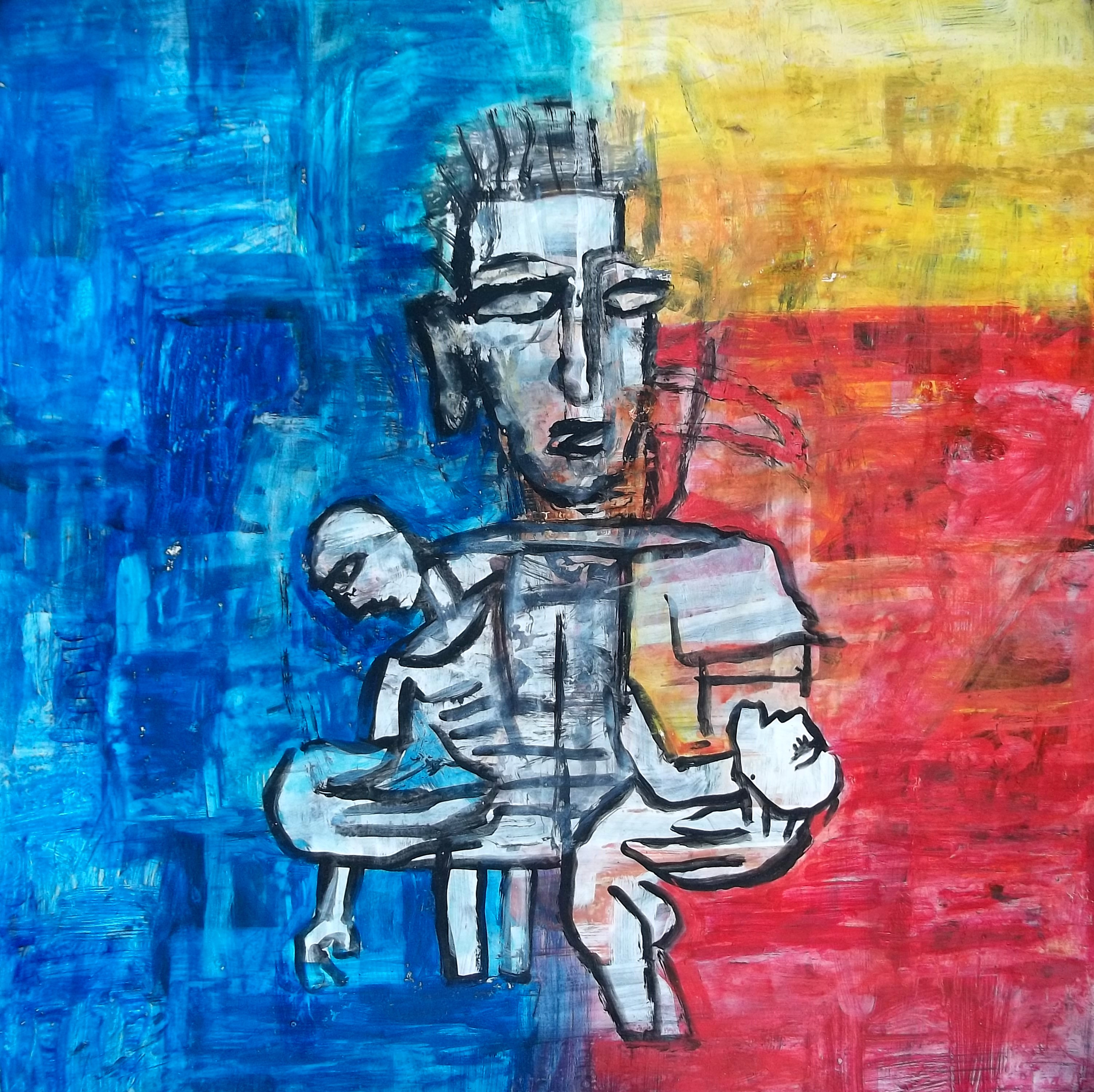
Tsunami survivors 60x60 cm, watercolor

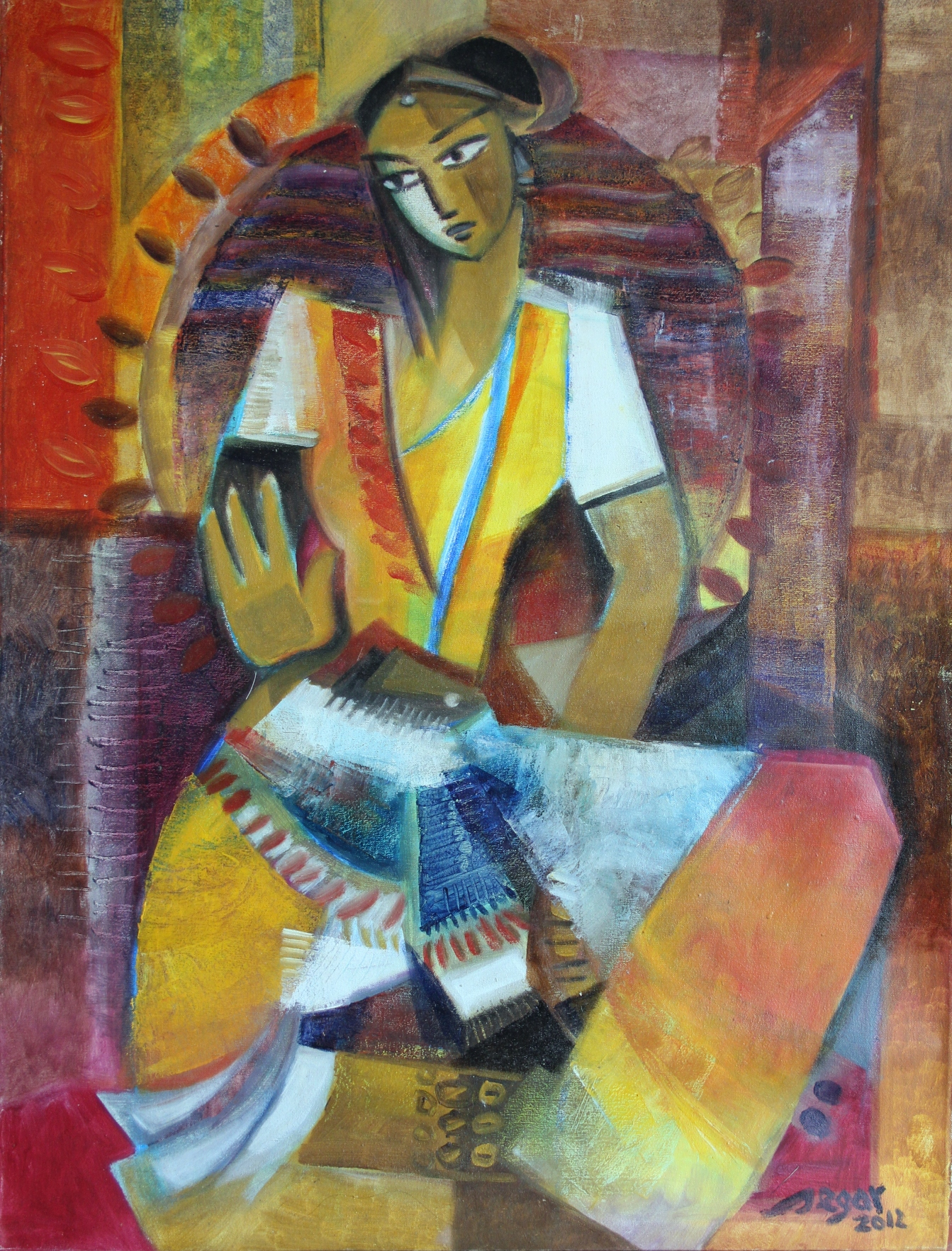
The Dance 40x30 inch oil on canvas 2012
