= Marg (magazine) =

Indian art magazine

- General Editor: Naman Parmeshwar Ahuja
- General Manager: Jyotsna Nambiar
- Categories: Art, Architecture
- Frequency: Quarterly
- Publisher: The Marg Foundation
- Founder: Mulk Raj Anand
- Founded: 1946
- First issue: October 1946
- Country: India
- Based in: Mumbai
- Language: English language
- Website: Official website

Marg (Pathway) is a quarterly Indian art magazine and a publisher of books on the arts, based in Mumbai. It began in 1946, with writer Mulk Raj Anand as its founding editor. It was initially intended to be an encyclopaedia of the arts and culture of India and South Asia.

The magazine was mainly funded by J.R.D. Tata of the Tata Group at its inception. Later on, after 1951 and until 1986, it was mostly funded by the Tata Group companies; then the National Centre for Performing Arts (NCPA) was formed as a trust with Marg as a division of NCPA. Since 2010 it has been functioning as an independent not-for-profit organization, The Marg Foundation.

The current General Editor is Naman Parmeshwar Ahuja and the current General Manager is Jyotsna Nambiar. Marg is one of the oldest and most respected art book publishers in India. It seeks corporate and private sponsorship to subsidize the cost of its publications.

Each year, apart from its four magazine issues it also publishes a book every quarter, and a few special publications on the subject of Indian and related art and heritage. It has also produced a series of documentary films on heritage sites and a film on Bombay/Mumbai.

== History ==
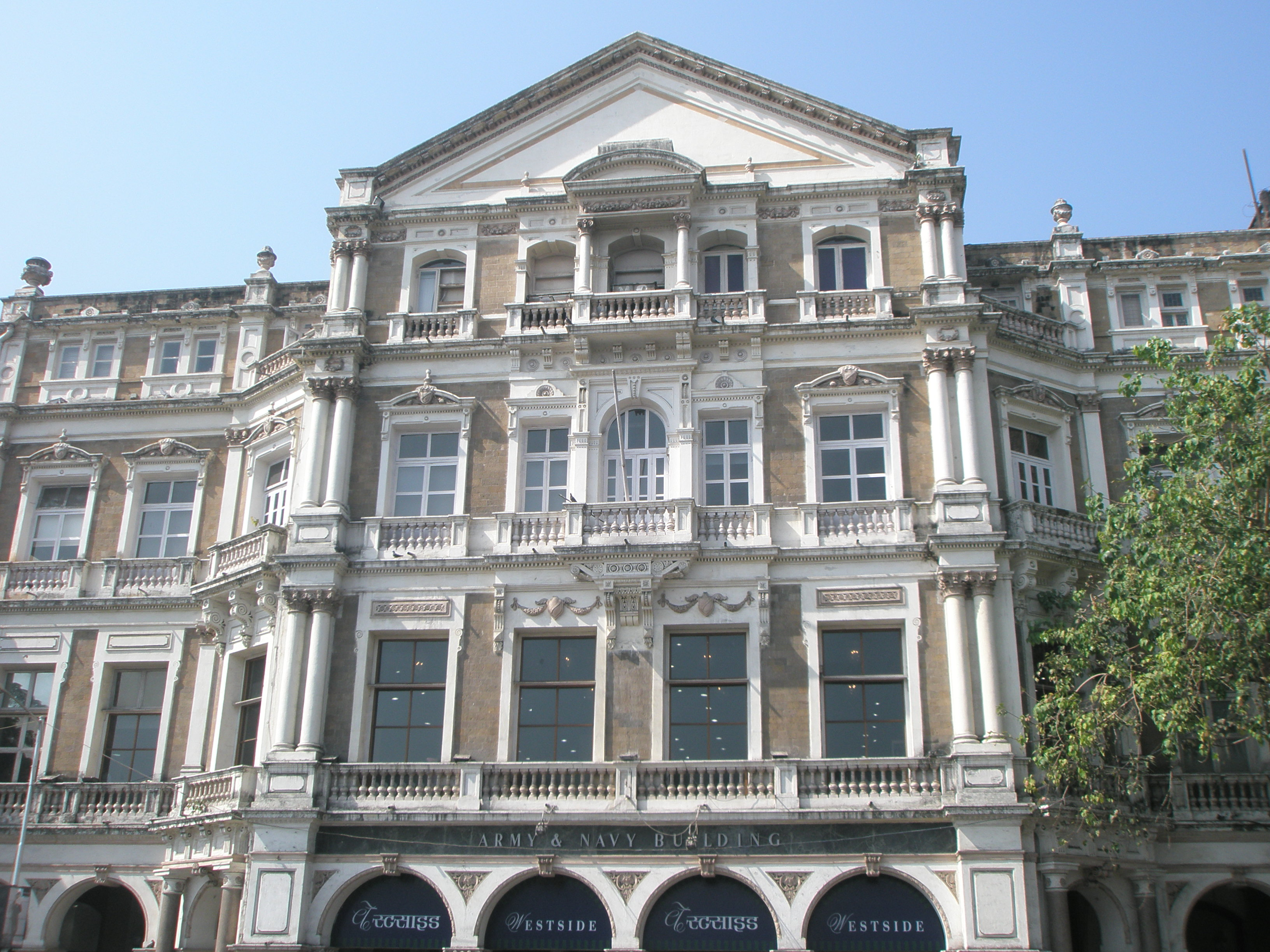
The historic Army & Navy Building in Kala Ghoda, Mumbai. Marg is located on the third floor of the building.

In the 1930s, Mulk Raj Anand had moved to England, to a flourishing literary career. After World War II, he returned to India, at the juncture of its independence and started Marg magazine with "seven ads and two rooms" provided by J. R. D. Tata and with Anil de Silva from Sri Lanka as assistant editor and art historian, Karl J. Khandalavala as an advisor. The aim was to bring Indian art into world focus.

It was in the pages of the magazine that architect Charles Correa and his colleagues first presented their proposal for a dream city in Mumbai, then Bombay, "New Bombay", later translated into policy.

Its office is situated in the historic Army & Navy Building in Kala Ghoda, Mumbai's premier art district.
