= Women in Sri Lanka =

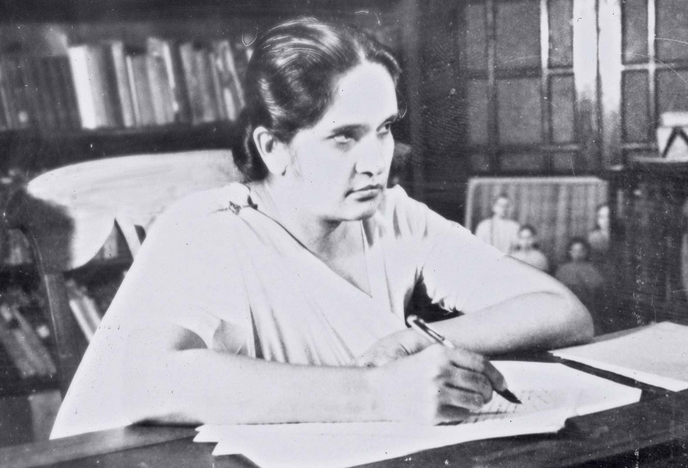
- Sirimavo Bandaranaike, the world's first female prime minister, she was democratically elected in Sri Lanka in 1960.

General statistics
- Maternal mortality (per 100,000): 36 (2017)
- Women in parliament: 5% (2021)
- Women over 25 with secondary education: 99% (2010)
- Women in labour force: 34.1% (2014)

Gender Inequality Index
- Value: 0.383 (2021)
- Rank: 90th out of 162

Global Gender Gap Index
- Value: 0.670 (2022)
- Rank: 110th out of 146

Women in Sri Lanka make up to 52.09% of the population according to the 2012 census of Sri Lanka. Sri Lankan women have contributed greatly to the country's development, in many areas. Historically, a masculine bias has dominated Sri Lankan culture, although woman have been allowed to vote in elections since 1931. Although Sri Lanka has been tremendously successful in achieving greater gender parity, women still suffer a lower status compared with men.

== History ==
Over two millennia ago, Sinhala women mostly of royal and noble rank enjoyed certain individual liberties and social opportunities approximating to that of equality with men. Sinhala women participated with men in many public matters, enjoyed an independent status as women, as mothers, and had an identity in private and public life, and the freedom to choose one's way of life. After the establishment of Buddhism, they made another progressive move, to renounce lay life and seek ordination. The effective strides they made socially, culturally, and politically from about 300 B.C. in the little island of Sinhala could be primarily attributed to Buddhist tenets and the Buddhist ethos. Women to a large degree were beneficiaries of this great humanism. Historical evidence suggests that there had been six queens ruling the island in the past. From infamous Queen Anula (47 BC – 42 BC) to Don Katharina (Kusumasana Devi) (1581) who ruled the country from Kandy. Queen Leelawati (1197–1212) the wife of King Parakramabahu (1153–1186), was the fourth queen of the island o Sri Lanka. She ruled the country from the second Kingdom Polonnaruwa of Sri Lanka.

The women's movement organized on Sri Lanka under the Ceylon Women's Union in 1904, and from 1925, the Mallika Kulangana Samitiya and then the Women's Franchise Union (WFU) successfully campaigned for the introduction of women's suffrage, which was achieved in 1931.

The role of women in Sri Lankan society is a topic that has been debated and fought over for several centuries. During the British colonial period, for example, a significant strand of nationalist, anticolonial agitation centred on the role and status of Ceylon women, both within and outside the home. In the transition years following colonial rule, Sri Lankan policymakers introduced a social policy package of free health and education services and subsidized food, which dramatically improved women's quality of life. Compared to the rest of South Asian countries, Sri Lankan woman have a high life expectancy (80 years), high literacy, and access to economic opportunities.

Year	Males (million)	Females (million)	Total (million)
1960	5.18	4.69	9.87
1970	6.44	6.05	12.49
1980	7.68	7.36	15.04
1990	8.76	8.57	17.33
2000	9.38	9.40	18.78
2010	9.87	10.39	20.26
2020	10.50	11.42	21.92

== Economic development ==
Expert agriculture and largely feminized labour forces in South Asia has expanded significantly in the last three decades. Men are twice as likely as women to be employed in Sri Lanka. (30-35%) The country's female labour force participation is lower than that of its regional neighbours like Nepal, China and Bangladesh. In fact, Sri Lanka has the 20th largest gender gap in labour force participation in the world. According to study, Sri Lanka could add 14% (US$20 billion) to its annual GDP by 2025 by increasing female labour force participation and the number of paid hours women work, as well as by adding women to higher productivity sectors. After India, this is the largest relative gain projected for the Asia-Pacific region. In the context of expected sovereign debt default where access to capital markets and multilateral loans will close-off government spending will fall economic gains of this scale cannot be ignored. In 2017, out of the 8.5 million females who were 15 years and above, only 3.1 million females were in the labour force, while only 2.9 million were employed. Out of this, as many as 1.5 million women were working in the informal sector.

== Legal rights and parliamentary representation ==
Women have served in the Parliament of Sri Lanka since 1931 and have held high positions in Parliament and the cabinet. Three women have become Prime Minister. Sirimavo Bandaranaike became the world's first female head of government on 21 July 1960. Her daughter, Chandrika Kumaratunga, was president of Sri Lanka's from 1994 to 2005.

== Domestic and sexual violence ==
=== Domestic violence ===
Two in five women in Sri Lanka have faced violence by a partner in their lifetime, a government survey found. Psychological violence at the hands of a partner, that involves emotional abuse or controlling a women's behaviour was recorded at 27.9%, the highest among all forms of violence past decade. Physical violence mostly experienced while their partners were drunk also prevailed mostly in the estate region, followed by the rural and urban areas respectively, according to the report. It outlined startling details which showed that the kids of most affected mothers were reported to have experienced nightmares, while 4.5% had dropped out of school. Women between 15 and 34 years were more prone to all forms of violence. 5,891 of child abuse cases were reported in the country from 2012 to 2020. According to the UN, 90% of women in Sri Lanka have experienced sexual harassment in public transport.

=== Rape ===
The age of consent in Sri Lanka is 16 that children below the age of sixteen are not considered able to give consent, thus, a person engaging in sexual relations with someone age 16 or under is recognised as having committed statutory rape. Statutory rape cases increase 35%, in 2021, compared to 2020, the performance report of the Sri Lanka Police for the year 2021 reveals. About 1,016 cases were reported in 2020 and in 2021 the number if reported incidents increased to 361.

Year	Rape	Sexual Abuse	Child Abuse
2012	1,728	674	863
2013	1,637	692	735
2014	1,565	624	772
2015	1,557	661	830
2016	1,565	562	800
2017	1,304	508	661
2018	1,284	520	755
2019	1,280	544	601
2020	1,016		
2021	1,377		

=== Child marriage ===
The internationally preferred age for marriage is 18 years for both boys and girls. Sri Lanka and Nepal are the only countries in South Asia that have specified a minimum age of 18 at which both boys and girls can legally marry. Child marriage is rare in Sri Lanka, child marriages account for 2% of the marriages on the island. That 2% however, is the result of the drawn-out civil war and unfortified laws.
