= Women's Franchise Union =

The Women's Franchise Union (WFU), was an organization for Women's suffrage in Sri Lanka, founded in 1927.

It was the first organization to campaign in a systematic way for women's suffrage in Sri Lanka, as well as the main organization for the purpose.

In 1909, the Ceylon Women's Union from 1904 first lifted the issue of women's suffrage, and in 1925, the Mallika Kulangana Samitiya first lifted a resolution at the sessions at the Ceylon National Congress in favor of the reform. In 1927 therefore, Women's Franchise Union was founded to campaign for the issue with Mary Rutnam and Agnes Nell among its founders.

Agnes De Silva was secretary of the Ceylon Franchise Union. She led an organized delegation of women members of the Franchise Union to present their case at the 1928 Donoughmare Commission on Constitutional Reform, which the British Government then in control of the island had constituted. They advocated for suffrage to be granted to women thirty years of age and older. The reforms she introduced later became a part of new constitution established in 1931. After the new constitution came into force the adult franchise was extended to women above the age of 21, regardless of their educational status.
