= Bangaru Thirumala Nayaka =

Bangaru Thirumala Nayaka, also known as Bangaru Tirumala and Vangaru Thirumala (as per European Records and notes), was a member of Madurai Nayak royal family and Governor/Commander of the Madurai Nayak King Vijaya Ranga Chokkanatha (1704–1731). His son, a young boy was adopted and crowned to the Madurai Throne, with the queen Meenakshi as queen regent, when the Madurai king died without heir. Strife between Bangaru Thirumala and queen Meenakshi would later erupt into many battles leading to the downfall of the dynasty. Later, through marriage alliances with the Sinhalese royalty, relatives of Bangaru Thirumala came to rule the Kandy kingdom in Sri Lanka. They ruled till 1815 when the last king, Sri Vikrama Rajasinha was deposed and taken captive by the British. He was exiled to Vellore Fort from Kandy.

== Family origins ==
Bangaru Tirumala was a member of royal family of Madurai Nayaks and a Governor/Commander of the Madurai Country in charge of Madurai and Tirunelveli regions. He is said to be descendant from another branch of the royal family issuing from Kumara Muttu, probably a younger brother of Thirumala Nayaka.

== Beginnings ==
When Vijaya Ranga Chokkanatha Nayak died in 1731 without an heir, one of his queens Meenakshi adopted Bangaru Thirumala’s son Vijayakumara then a young boy as an heir for the Madurai Throne and became Queen Regent for the adopted prince. During this time Tiruchirapalli Fort was the headquarters of Madurai Kingdom, while Madurai was bifurcated into a Province, still retaining the vast Fort.

=== Queen Meenakshi ===
When Queen Meenakshi took over the administration, the Kingdom was in deep trouble, with enemy troops of Delhi Sultans, Mysore armies and Maratha armies attempting to seize the throne. Also pilferage of enemy spies and widespread anarchy prevailed in the kingdom. The palace administrators were rampant on treason and corruption. The queen attempting to bring order, sacked many troublesome officials and commanders, and replaced them with better ones. She was also assisted by her brother Venkata Perumal Nayak and things looked better for a period.

== Madurai throne claimants ==
Hardly a year or two passed when Bangaru Tirumala, feeling that he deserved the throne, instigated an insurrection against the queen. He was also joined by Queen Meenakshi’s recently ousted Minister "Dalavay Venkatachari". Their first attempt at ousting the queen by attacking the Tiruchirapalli fort ended in a failure.

Bangaru Tirumala operated from Madurai Fort while the Queen held court from the Tiruchirapalli Fort Palace. During this period the Madurai Kingdom was a feudatory of Mughal empire, whose representative in the south was the Nawab of Carnatic. The Nizam of Hyderabad held an intermediate authority.

Bangaru Tirumala approached Safdar Ali Khan, son of the Carnatic Nawab, with an offer of three million rupees to oust the queen in favour of him. The latter after accepting the offer, settled the dispute in Bangaru Tirumala’s favour by declaring him as the King. Safdar Ali Khan then left to Arcot without attacking Meenakshi’s fort in Tiruchirapalli and left the matters to his kin and advisor Chanda Sahib to enforce the new events. The wily queen, not paying any attempt at the suspicious settlement, responded by offering Chanda Sahib a crore of rupees (ten million) and to declare her duly entitled to the throne. Startled at the detour of affairs Bangaru Tirumala left to Madurai, to rule over that province and Tirunelveli, without wishing any harm to Chanda Sahib.

== End of Nayak dynasty ==
Bangaru Tirumala‘s withdrawal was only temporary as he collected a good number of discontents from the army and Polygars again launched offensive attacks on the Tiruchirapalli Fort. Several battles and attacks continued on either sides, with Bangaru Tirumala finally seizing the Dindigul Fort, a key fort and territory in between the Madurai and Tiruchirapalli. Two years passed (1736), when Chanda Sahib returned to Trichrapalli, combining with Meenakshi, attacked Bangaru Tirumala, who was still ruling the southern provinces of Madurai. In a battle at Ammayanayakkanur near Dindigul, Bangaru Thirumala’s army, largely strengthened by some Polygars, fought a well-contested battle against the Queen and Chanda Sahib with over 80,000 soldiers, but was finally defeated, taking refuge in Sivaganga palace.

Chanda Sahib, after the victory over Bangaru Tirumala, proclaimed himself ruler of Meenakshi’s kingdom, after locking the queen up in her palace, later driving her to consume poison, thus putting an end to over 200 years of Nayak rule in Madurai.

== With the Tanjore Marathas ==
Bangaru Tirumala still undaunted joined with the Tanjore Marathas to oust Chanda Sahib. Tanjore Kingdom was recently (1740) attacked and subjugated by Chanda Sahib, compelling them to cede Karaikal to the French, who were Chanda Sahib’s new ally. Also Chanda Sahib was left on his own by his Uncle Carnatic Nawab, but still suspicious over the former's ambitions.

Bangaru Tirumala and the Tanjore King joined together and called in assistance of the Marathas of Satara in Bombay. These people having their own grievances against the Carnatic Nawabs (with whom Chanda Sahib was still identified) marched down with a vast army in the south in 1741, first defeating and killing the Nawab of Arcot in the Battle, later after a three months siege at Trichinopoly fort, took Chanda Sahib as a captive, killing both Chanda Sahib’s brothers.

Finally in 1751, Chanda Sahib was captured after a series of Carnatic Wars and beheaded by a Tanjore general, Mankoji.

== Madurai again ==
The Marathas disregarding the claims of Bangaru Tirumala appointed a Maratha Morari Rao of Gooty (in 1741), as their governor of the conquered kingdom. In 1744, the Nizam of Hyderabad sent an army to re-establish his weakened authority in the Carnatic making Morari Rao flee from Madurai. The Nizam appointed Anwar-ud-din as Nawab of Arcot, and ordered Vangaru Tirumala to be appointed to the Throne of Madurai. The rulers of Ramnad, Sivaganga, Tanjore were also keen on appointing Bangaru Tirumala on the throne thereby to retain a Nayak Kingdom. Thus for a brief period Bangaru Thirumala seemed to take the crown as a de jure ruler, while the administrative control was carried out by the Arcot army. Bangaru was also repeatedly warned of attempts by Anwar-ud-din and his aides on plans to usurp the Throne. But very little is known afterwards as some sources point out that he was poisoned by Anwar-ud-din.

== Relationship with Kandy Nayaks ==
One section of Bangaru Thirumala’s family came to rule Kandy through marriage alliances with the Sinhalese royalty. They were the last dynasty to rule Sri Lanka. They are often mentioned as Nayakkar Dynasty or Vaduga Rulers or Nayaks of Kandy. Among the four kings who constituted the Kandy Nayak dynasty only the last three were related to Bangaru Thirumala.

Background:
Three kings of the Kandy Mahanuwara kingdom, had married brides from Madurai. These kings were:
Rajasinghe II (1635–1687)
Vimaladharmasurya II (1687–1707)
Vira Narendra Sinha (1707–1739). The royal status of these brides or their relationships to the Nayakas of Mudurai have not been established. The available documents in both Madura and Sri Lanka make it highly doubtful that these brides were of royal descent. In the case of the bride who married Vira Narendra Sinha, it has been established that she was the daughter of a Nayak named Pitti Nayak, who had probably seen better days, but was a very poor man when his daughter married the king of Kandy.

The bride was accompanied by her father, mother and brother (who was young a child), and her family continued to reside there. Later in 1732 Narendra Sinha falls critically ill, and being childless, he adopts the brother of his queen who had grown up in the Kandyan court, as son and heir. When Narendra Sinha died in 1739, this prince ascended the throne as Sri Vijaya Rajasinha.

The new king Sri Vijaya Rajasinha, married princess Upendramma, daughter of Narenappa Nayaka, who was the cousin of Bangaru Thirumala (i.e. their mothers were sisters). This queen too is accompanied by her father, mother and 2 young brothers, who all take residence in Kandy.

Sri Vijaya Rajasinha too dies childless, and his wife's brother, i.e. Narenappa's son, ascended the throne, under the name Kirti Sri Rajasinha. When he too dies without a child, his brother ascended the throne as Rajadhi Rajasinha. When Rajadi Rajasinha also dies childless, Sri Vikrama Rajasinha of Sri Lanka (1798-1815 AD), ascended the throne. He was queen Upendramma’s nephew.

== Other descendants ==
Several of Bangaru Thirumala’s descendants lived in the Vellaikurichi Fort in Sivaganga Zamin, and their family living there till recent times. The Vellaikurichi Fort along with some encompassing villages were granted by the Raja of Sivaganga.

In the 1820s, a descendant of Bangaru was reported to be in Madurai seeking pecuniary assistance from the government. Also it is reported, every year they conducted a ceremony of reciting poems of their royal forebears of their valour and deeds on the first day of Tamil month of Chittirai.

== See also ==
- Nayaks of Madurai
- Madurai
- Nayaks of Kandy

== Sources ==
- Biography of Dhandavarayan Pillai:Pradhani of Sivaganga Zamin; Author: Mu.Balakrishnan M.A., M.Ed.; published by Manickvasagar Pathipagam, Chennai in 2005
- The Kandyan Kingdom of Sri Lanka, 1707-1782: Author: Lorna Srimathie Dewaraja M.A.(Ceylon), Ph.D.(London). ISBN 9555520186, Colombo, Sri Lanka : Lake House Investments, 1988
