= Sangili =

Sangili may refer to:

- Sangili (1982 film), an Indian Tamil-language film by C. V. Rajendran
- Sangili (2019 film), a Sri Lankan film
- Sangili Murugan, an Indian film actor, scriptwriter and producer
- Sangili Karuppan, a Hindu deity worshipped in Tamil Nadu, India
