= Marassana =

- Village
- Interactive map of Marassana
- Country: Sri Lanka
- Province: Central Province
- Time zone: UTC+5:30 (Sri Lanka Standard Time)
- Postal code: 20210

Marassana is a village which gave accommodation to the King Sri Vikrama Rajasinha of Kandy who ran away secretly due to an enemy attack on Sri Lanka [formerly known as Ceylon]. It is located within the Central Province.

== See also ==
- List of towns in Central Province, Sri Lanka
