= Bandhanaya =

Bandanaya
- promotional poster
- බන්ධනය
- Directed by: Udayakantha Warnasuriya
- Written by: Indika Rathnayake
- Produced by: Udayakantha Warnasuriya
- Starring: Cyril Wickramage; Hemal Ranasinghe; Dulani Anuradha
- Cinematography: K.D Dayananda
- Edited by: Pravin Jayaratne
- Music by: Nadun Rathnayake
- Production company: Dil Films
- Distributed by: CEL Theatres
- Release date: 7 April 2017
- Country: Sri Lanka
- Language: Sinhala

Bandanaya (Sinhala: බන්ධනය), is a 2017 Sri Lankan Sinhala horror film directed and produced by Udayakantha Warnasuriya. Musical score was done by Nadun Rathnayake. It stars Cyril Wickramage, Hemal Ranasinghe, Dulani Anuradha in lead roles along with Suvineetha Weerasinghe, Nilmini Tennakoon and Ravindra Yasas. The film was released in 50 CEL circuit cinemas in addition to 12 cinemas which screen the movie in 3D format. It is noted for being presented in black-and-white monochrome.

The film trailer was released in October 2016. The opening screening was held in Regal Theatre, Colombo. It is the 1273rd Sri Lankan film in the Sinhala cinema.

== Plot ==
In 1932, A rural village falls under the control of Mahasona Yaka. The tantric of the village, Menik hami who practice esoteric ritualism takes advantages of this to gain a land which is the reason of hatred two brothers. He uses his brother's granddaughter who was bitten by a snake to make a deal with devil.

== Cast ==
- Cyril Wickramage as Menik Hami
- Saheli Sadithma as Sumana
- Hemal Ranasinghe as Jayasoma
- Dulani Anuradha as Piyasili
- Sudam Katukithula as Gemunu
- Suvineetha Weerasinghe as Selestina
- Nilmini Tennakoon as Nandawathi
- Leonie Kotelawala as Alis Nona
- Ravindra Yasas as Wimalasiri
- Priyankara Rathnayake as Ariyapala
- Wilman Sirimanna as Dingi Rala
- Ariyasena Gamage
- Ranjith Silva as Devil
- Kumara Wadurassa as Baker
- Udaya Kumari as Dead woman
- Nethalie Nanayakkara as Piyasili's granny
- Ranjith Rubasinghe
