= Sri Rajadhi Rajasinha =

King of Kandy from 1782 to 1798

Sri Rajadhi Rajasinha ශ්‍රී රාජාධි රාජසිංහ
- Bhupathi; Lankeshwara; Thrisinhaladheeshwara
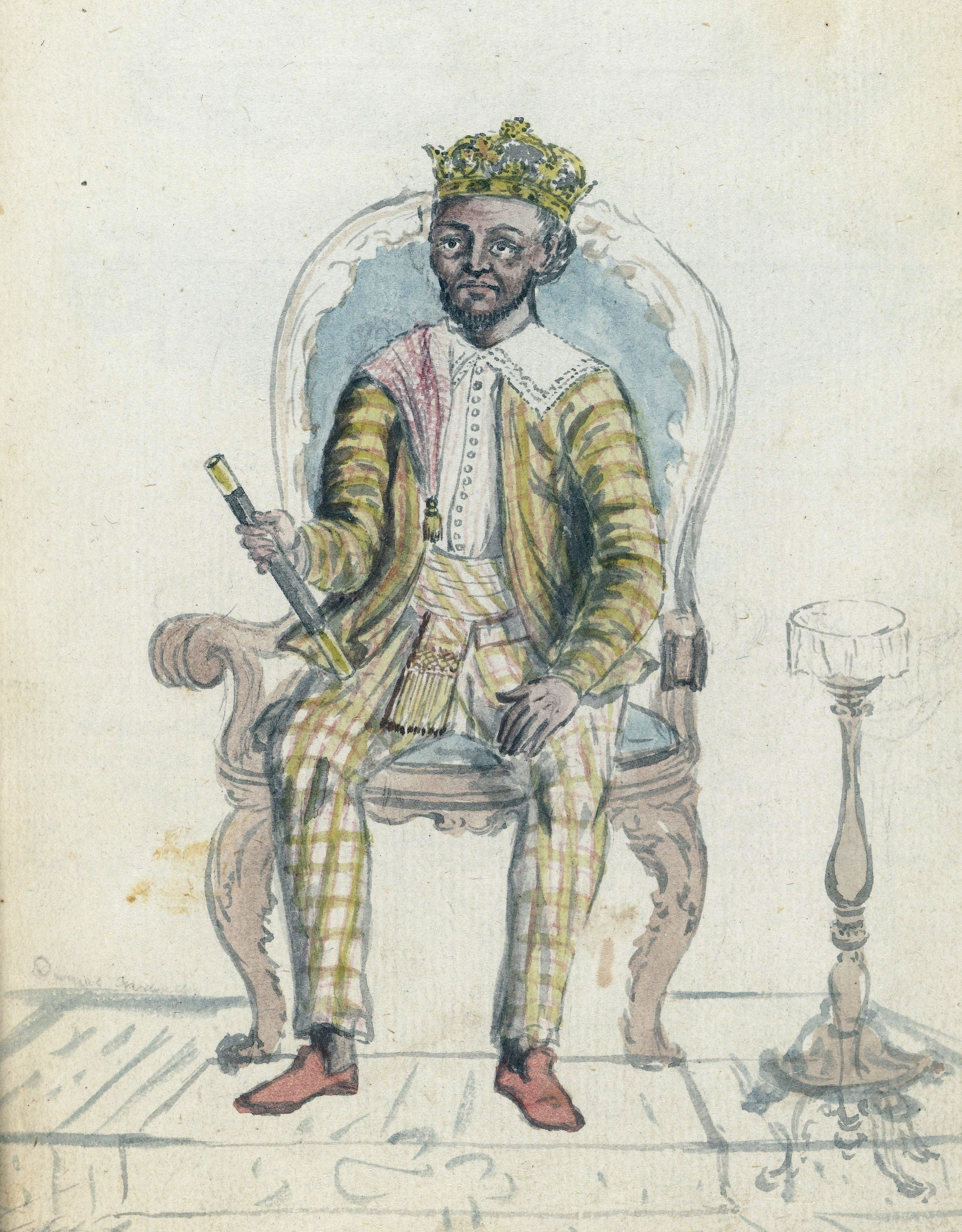
- Sri Rajadhi Raja Sinha

King of Kandy
- Reign: 2 January 1782 – 26 July 1798
- Coronation: 1782
- Predecessor: Kirti Sri Rajasinha
- Successor: Sri Vikrama Rajasinha
- Born: Birth date unknown Kandy, Kingdom of Kandy, Sri Lanka
- Died: 26 July 1798; Sri Lanka
- Burial: Royal Cremation Yard, Asgiri Temple, Kandy, Sri Lanka
- Spouse: Queen Consort; Alamelu Ammal Royal Concubine; Upendra Ammal Royal Concubine; Rangammal Devi Royal Concubine; Siriyammal Devi Mistress; Mampitiye Devi Mistress; Lady Subbramma Nayak
- Issue: None
- House: Nayaks of Kandy
- Father: Lord Narendrappa Nayakkar
- Mother: Lady Upendramma Devi
- Religion: Theravada Buddhism and Shaivite Hinduism

Sri Rajadhi Rajasinha (Sinhala:ශ්‍රී රාජාධි රාජසිංහ, Tamil:ஸ்ரீ ராஜாதி ராஜசிங்கம்; reigned 1782–1798) was a member of the Madurai royal family and succeeded his brother, Kirti Sri Rajasinha as King of Kandy in 1782. He was known as a poet-king, with at least one poem written by his hand still known.

== Early life ==
Rajadhi Rajasinha was the second son of Narendrappa Nayakkar of the Madurai Nayakkar clan. The younger brother of Kirti Sri, he was raised as a devout Buddhist. His brother died from a fall off a horse in 1781 and Rajadhi Rajasinha ascended to the throne in early 1782.

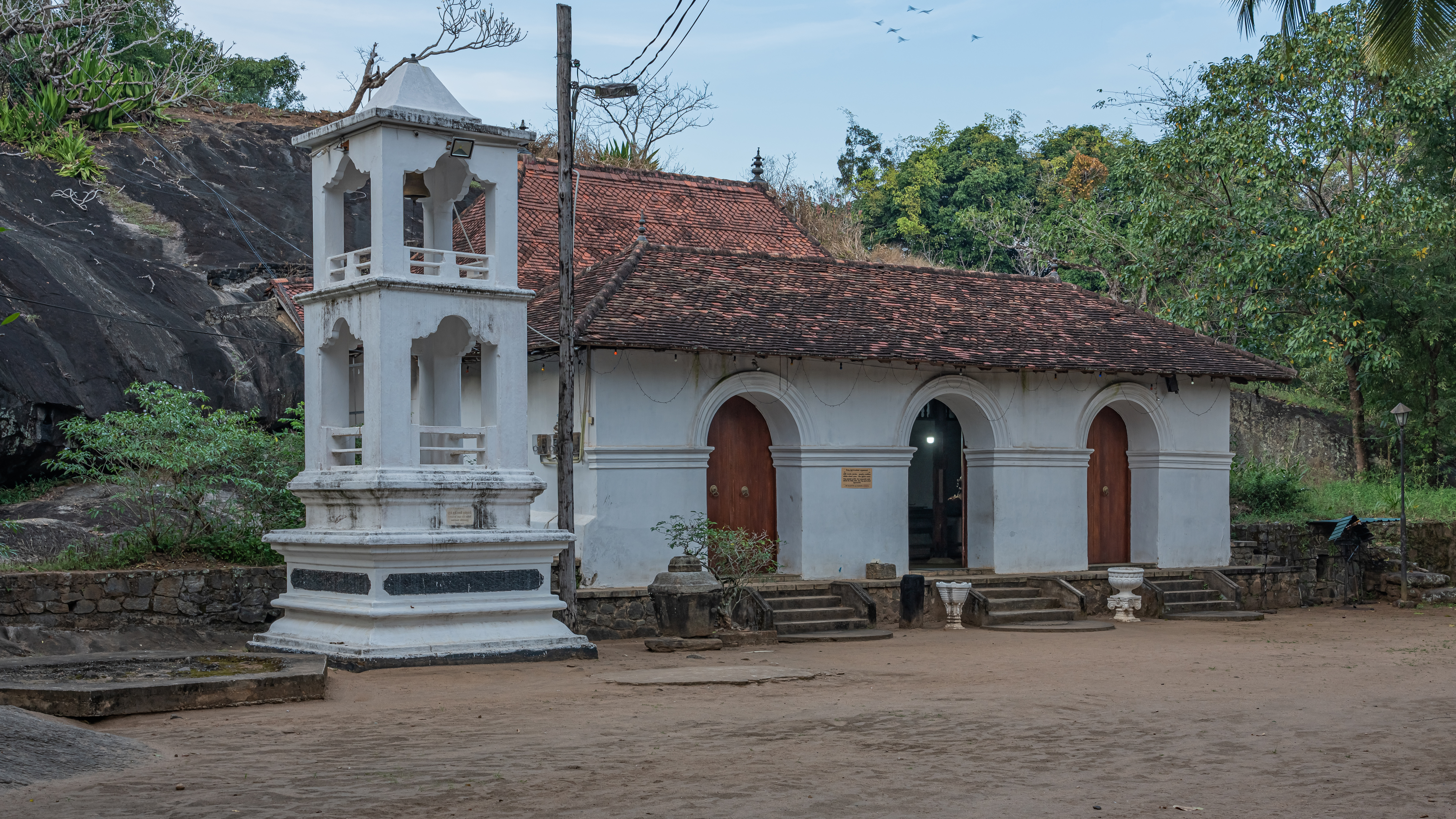
The Degaldoruwa Royal Temple, built in 1771 and completed during the reign of King Rajadhi Rajasinha.

== Marriages ==
He had five Nayakkar wives. His Queen Consort was Alamelu Ammal Devi. His second wife was Upendra Ammal Devi who was arrived from Rameshwaram, South India. His third wife, Rangammal Devi, was a younger sister of the Queen Consort. He appointed Siriyammal Devi as his fourth wife, who was another younger sister of the Queen Consort. He also kept one of his elder brother‘s royal consorts, Mampitiye Devi, as a mistress. Lady Subbramma Nayak, who was a younger sister of second consort Upendra Ammal Devi became Rajadhi Rajasinghe's mistress after her husband’s death.

== Reign ==
Sri Rajadhi Rajasinha ruled the Kandyan Kingdom for nearly two decades. During his reign he maintained largely peaceful relations with the Dutch army. Hugh Boyd visited the Kandy court shortly after Rajadhi's accession and noted that the court was divided into different factions based on support of the Dutch, with the pro-Dutch faction in the strongest position.

Like his brother, he was a patron of Buddhism and restored a number of temples, as well as granting lands to new ones, as did his brother. The famous Court Jester Andare served him.

== Succession ==
After Rajadhi Rajasinha died, he was succeeded by his teenage nephew, Sri Vikrama Rajasinha of Kandy, the last king of Kandy.

== See also ==
- Mahavamsa
- List of monarchs of Sri Lanka
- History of Sri Lanka

Sri Rajadhi Rajasinha Kandy Nayakar Dynasty Born: ? ? Died: 26 July 1798
Regnal titles
Preceded by Kirti Sri Rajasinha	King of Kandy; 2 January 1782–26 July 1798	Succeeded by Sri Vikrama Rajasinha
