= Ahelepola Kumarihami =

2014 film directed by Sugath Samarakoon

- Sinhala: ඇහැළේපොළ කුමාරිහාමි
- Directed by: Sugath Samarakoon
- Written by: Sugath Samarakoon
- Produced by: Rupun Films
- Starring: Dulani Anuradha; Jackson Anthony; Sriyantha Mendis
- Cinematography: Lalith M. Thomas
- Edited by: Ajith Ramanayake
- Music by: Rohana Weerasinghe
- Production company: Rupun Films
- Distributed by: EAP Theatres
- Release date: 1 August 2014
- Running time: 130 minutes
- Country: Sri Lanka
- Language: Sinhala

Ahelepola Kumarihami (Sinhala: ඇහැළේපොළ කුමාරිහාමි) colloquially as Ehelepola Kumarihami is a 2014 Sri Lankan Sinhala epic historical film directed by Sugath Samarakoon and produced by Gayan Ranadheera for Rupun Films. It stars Dulani Anuradha and Jackson Anthony in lead roles along with Sriyantha Mendis and Nadeeka Gunasekara. Music composed by Rohana Weerasinghe. It is the 1208th Sri Lankan film in the Sinhala cinema. The film is about the tragic historic incidence, where the last king of Sri Lanka, King Sri Vickrama Rajasinha slaughtered the entire family of Ehelepola Nilame due to mistaken as a betrayer to the Kandyan Kingdom.

The film reached 50 days. The official website www.ahelepolakumarihami.com was launched in June 2014.

== Cast ==
- Dulani Anuradha as Ehelepola Kumarihami
- Anura Dharmasiriwardena as Ehelepola Nilame
- Jackson Anthony as King Sri Vickrama Rajasinha
- Pramuditha Udaya Kumara as Madduma Bandara Ehelapola
- Chamindu Bawantha as Loku Bandara Ehelapola
- Sriyantha Mendis as Keppetipola Disawe
- Buddhadasa Vithanarachchi as Rev. Wariyapola Sri Sumangala Thero
- Cletus Mendis as Molligoda Adikaram
- Nadeeka Gunasekara as Pusselle Kumarihami
- Lucky Dias as Aritta Kee-Vendu
- Susil Perera as Kalawana
- Giriraj Kaushalya as Lokuru Naide
- Chanchala Warnasuriya as Venkata Rajamma
- Vishaka Siriwardana as Molligoda Kumarihami
- Sugath Wijesekara as Dingirala
- Sandun Wijesiri
- Wilson Karunaratne
- Vinu Siriwardena
- Aravinda Dombagahawaththa as Mampitiya
- Rinsley Weeraratne
- Anura Bandara Rajaguru
