= Ape Kaalaye Patachara =

- Sinhala: අපේ කාලයේ පටාචාරා
- Directed by: Sugath Samarakoon
- Written by: Sugath Samarakoon
- Produced by: Helawood Films
- Starring: Dulani Anuradha; Saranga Disasekara; Rodney Warnakula
- Cinematography: Sujith Nishantha
- Edited by: Ajith Ramanayake
- Music by: Sarath Wickrama
- Distributed by: LFD & MPI Theatres
- Release date: 9 December 2016
- Country: Sri Lanka
- Language: Sinhala

Ape Kaalaye Patachara (Sinhala: අපේ කාලයේ පටාචාරා) is a 2016 Sri Lankan Sinhala epic biographical film directed by Sugath Samarakoon and produced by Vishwakumara Wathiyage for Helawood Films. It stars Dulani Anuradha and Saranga Disasekara in lead roles along with Vinu Udani Siriwardhana and Cletus Mendis. Music composed by Sarath Wickrama. The film was shot near Anuradhapura. It is the 1266th Sri Lankan film in the Sinhala cinema. The film has influenced on Buddhist Jathaka Stories regarding Patachara, who lost all of her family by tragic incidents.

== Cast ==
- Dulani Anuradha as Patachara / Kumari
- Saranga Disasekara as Jeevantha
- Sarath Dikkumbura as Ranga Buddha
- Anura Dharmasiriwardena
- Cletus Mendis as Situthuma
- Vinu Udani Siriwardhana as Nun
- Anusha Dissanayake as Female monk
- Mayanga Bandara as Nun
- Samantha Weerakoon as Bhanuka
- Anusha Jayasuriya as Situ Deviya
- Sanjaya Samarakoon as Mithra Bandu
- Nandana Weerakoon as Doctor
- Helani Bandara as Sugala
- Anju Narmada as Shanthini
- Nilakshika Silva as Keshaki
- Iresha Senadhipathi as Mandani
- Priya Vithanachchi as Vishaka

== Soundtrack ==
No.	Title	Lyrics	Singer(s)	Length
1.	"Madura Sara Sanda"	Amila Thenuwara	Uresha Ravihari
