= Dulani Anuradha =

Sri Lankan actress and dancer

Palamandadeege Dulani Anuradha Fernando, popularly known as Dulani Anuradha, is a Sri Lankan Sinhalese film actress and a dancer by profession. She is best known for the roles in films, Aba, Vijaya Kuweni and Ahelepola Kumarihami.

== Cinema career ==
She primarily portrays characters in historical films and teledramas, but has also acted in fictional movies such as Sanghili and Paravarthana. Anuradha won a Best Actress award for her role in the film Vjaya Kuweni. Dulani plays the major role in most of director, Sugath Samarakoon’s films. She played the main role in Bahu-Barya 2 directed by Udayakantha Warnakulasooriya.

== Filmography ==
Key
†	Denotes films that have not yet been released

Year	Film	Role	Ref.
2008	Aba	Gumbaka Butha	
2012	Vijaya Kuweni	Kuveni	
2014	Parawarthana	Kusum	
2014	Ehelepola Kumarihami	Ehelepola Kumarihami	
2016	Ape Kaalaye Patachara	Patachara	
2017	Bandhanaya	Piyasili	
2019	Sangile	Sangile	
2023	Abhisheka	Sakunthala	
2024	Hora Uncle	Champa	
TBA	Kidnap †	Kavya	
TBA	Bahu Barya 2 †	Filming	
TBA	Sparsha †		

== Television roles ==
She acted in few television serials and known to refuse many soap operas. She acted as Pabalu in the serial Wahinna Muthu Wessak. She played roles in Sumithra Rahubadda’s Pinibara Yamaya (as Udathari Manamendra) and Maha Polowa Ape Newei as well. She acted in a negative role in the drama Oba Ayemath Avidin.

Anuradha was represented as a judge in many reality shows such as Laugfs on Stage season I, Derana City of Dance and Derana Little Star.

=== Selected serials ===
- Maha Polowa Ape Newei
- Oba Ayemath Avidin
- Pinibara Yamaya
- Sakisanda Suwaris
- Wahinna Muthu Wessak

== Awards and accolades ==
Her acting career made a turning point, when she won the award for the best actress at many local film festival for the role Gumbaka Butha in Jackson Anthony's film Aba.

=== OCIC Awards ===
Year	Nominee / work	Award	Result
2008	Aba	Best Actress	Won

=== Sarasaviya Awards ===
Year	Nominee / work	Award	Result
2008	Aba	Best Actress	Won

=== SIGNIS Awards ===
Year	Nominee / work	Award	Result
2012	Vijaya Kuweni	Best Actress	Won
