= Kidnap (2023 film) =

- Sinhala: කිඩ්නැප්
- Directed by: Suranga de Alwis
- Written by: Adivi Sesh
- Produced by: Sangeetha Films; Isuru Films
- Starring: Arjuna Kamalanath; Dulani Anuradha; Mahendra Perera
- Cinematography: Thusitha Anuradha
- Edited by: Ruwan Weerasinghe
- Music by: Sarath de Alwis
- Release date: 15 March 2023
- Country: Sri Lanka
- Language: Sinhala

Kidnap (Sinhala: කිඩ්නැප්) is a 2023 Sri Lankan Sinhala-language action thriller film directed by Suranga de Alwis and co-produced by Suranga de Alwis himself for Sangeetha Films and by Arjuna Kamalanath for Isuru Films. It stars Arjuna Kamalanath and Dulani Anuradha in lead roles, alongside Mahendra Perera and Buddhika Jayaratne. The music was composed by Sarath de Alwis.

The film was initially scheduled to be released on 28 March 2018 but was later delayed. The film was released at the Cinemabhimana film festival in 2023. This film is a remake of the 2016 Telugu film Kshanam.

== Cast ==
- Dulani Anuradha as Police officer Kavya
- Buddhika Jayarathne as Police officer Jaye
- Arjuna Kamalanath as Waruna
- Mahendra Perera as Upali
- Dananjaya Siriwardana as Suda
- Ameesha Kavindi as Nisansala
- D.B. Gangodathenna
- Rajitha Hiran Chamikara
- Isuru Lokuhettiarachchi
- Mark Samson
- Harshana Bethmage
- Jayarathna Galagedara
- Dilki Mihiraji
- Anura Bandara Rajaguru
- Shiromika Fernando
- Kumudu Nishantha
- Manel Wanaguru
- Rohani Weerasinghe
- Ashen shavinda
