= Hora Uncle =

- Directed by: Harshana Wickramasinghe
- Written by: Nihal Peiris
- Produced by: Saman Dharmawansha; Suminda Lowe
- Starring: Mahendra Perera; Dulani Anuradha; Janaka Kumbukage
- Cinematography: Suresh Dammika
- Edited by: Dilan Gunawardana
- Music by: Nawarathna Gamage
- Production company: Alankara Films
- Distributed by: EAP Theatres
- Release date: 8 August 2024
- Running time: 108 minutes
- Country: Sri Lanka
- Language: Sinhala

Hora Uncle (Sinhala: හොරා අන්කල්) is a 2024 Sri Lankan Sinhalese children's film by Harshana Wickramasinghe in his directorial film debut and produced by Suminda Lowe and Saman Dharmawansha. It stars Mahendra Perera and Dulani Anuradha in lead roles along with Janaka Kumbukage and Kumara Thirimadura. Music composed by Nawarathna Gamage.

== Cast ==
- Mahendra Perera as Ranjith
- Dulani Anuradha as Champa
- Janaka Kumbukage as Nalinda
- Kumara Thirimadura
- Umayangana Wickramasinghe
- Anuruddhika Padukkage as Sandali's mother
- Ryan Van Rooyen
- Rajasinge Loluwagoda
- Ashika Mathasinghe
- Kulasiri Malliakarachchi
- Sampath Hewapelandage
- Upul Gunawardane
- Jayarathna Galagedara
- Saman Dharmawansha

=== child cast ===
- Senulya Danthanarayana as Sandali
- Nethpriya Manubashitha as Bindu
- Dewdi Satheeshka as Pasindu

== Production ==
The film marked the maiden cinema direction by Harshana Wickramasinghe. It was co-produced by Saman Dharmawansha and Suminda Lowe. Suresh Dhammika made cinematography, Mananuwan Rupasinghe is the makeup artist and Dhammika Hewaduwatte made art direction. Nihal Pieris is the script writer and choreography is handled by Nilan Maligaspe. Dilan Gunawardena is the sound editor, Nishan Senarathne is the linear producer and Nawarathna Gamage is the music director. Bandula Nanayakkarawasam and director himself are the lyricists. Late singer Lakshman Wijesekara and Parami Aloka made background vocals. The film was shot in an around Colombo and Lankagama.

== Release ==
The film was screened on 25 June 2022 in Milan, Italy at Centro Sportivo Culturale Asteria and later in Rome and Padua.
