= Nayaks of Kandy =

Rulers in Sri Lanka, 1739 to 1815

Kandy Nayak Dynasty නායක්කාර රාජවංශය கண்டி நாயக்கர் வம்சம்
- Royal house
- Flag of the Kingdom of Kandy
- Parent family: Madurai Nayak dynasty
- Country: Sri Lanka, India
- Origin: Madurai, Tamil Nadu, India
- Founded: 1739
- Founder: Sri Vijaya Raja Singha
- Current head: Raja Mohan Babu
- Final ruler: Sri Vikrama Rajasinha
- Estate: Kingdom of Kandy
- Dissolution: 1815 under the terms of the Kandyan Convention

The Nayaks of Kandy, also known as the Kandyan Nayak Dynasty (Sinhala: මහනුවර නායක්කාරවරු Mahanuwara Nayakkarawaru, Tamil: கண்டி நாயக்கர்) were the rulers of the Kingdom of Kandy from 1739 to 1815. They were the last dynasty to rule Sri Lanka before its full colonisation by the British. The term "Nayak" is derived from the Sanskrit word Nāyaka, meaning "leader" or "governor."

The rise of the Nayak family to power occurred after the death of King Vira Narendrasinha, who left no legitimate heir. As a result, the throne passed to his brother-in-law, Sri Vijaya Rajasinha, who was crowned in 1739. The Kandyan Nayaks were a cadet branch of the Madurai Nayak dynasty and were also related to the Thanjavur Nayaks. Like the Madurai and Thanjavur Nayaks, the Kandyan Nayaks were also of Telugu Balija origin. They spoke Telugu and Tamil, with Sinhala and Tamil being used as their court languages.

These alliances were strengthened through intermarriage between Kandy and South India, reviving the tradition of marrying South Indian nobility, which continued throughout the 17th and 18th centuries. The Nayaks were known for their childless marriages, which led to a non-linear succession. Four Nayak monarchs ruled Kandy, with the last, Sri Vikrama Rajasinha, deposed in 1815 due to the collusion between the Kandyan nobility and the British. This led to his exile in Vellore Fort, India, and the end of the Kandyan Nayak dynasty.

The dynasty is noted for its contributions to Sri Lankan religious architecture, especially through the establishment of temples dedicated to their clan deity, Vishnu, also known as Upulvan in Sinhala. A notable example is the Kandy Vishnu Temple in the capital. Although the Nayaks practiced Vaishnavite Hinduism, they were also patrons of Theravada Buddhism, offering support to the Buddhist sanghas. The Kandy Nayak flag, featuring a yellow lion holding a sword on a red background, became a central element of the current Sri Lankan flag.

== Origins ==
The Nayaks of South India started as governors of Vijayanagara Empire ruling parts of Tamil Nadu during the 14th and 15th centuries. After the Vijayanagara Empire collapsed in the mid-16th century some of these governors declared independence and established their own kingdoms in Gingee, Thanjavur, Madurai and Chandragiri.

They were of Balija origin, spoke Telugu and Tamil and used Sinhala and Tamil as their court languages. But they used Telugu with their familiars. According to a Telugu work called Sinhaladvipa Katha, the Nayak king Kumara Krishnappa, who reigned at Madurai (1562–1572), is said to have conquered Kandy. Kumara Krishnappa killed the then reigning Kandy king, sent the late king's wife and children to Anuradhapura and placed his own brother-in-law Vijaya Gopala Naidu as his viceroy in Kandy.

The last king of the Kandy Mahanuwara dynasty, Narendra Sinha, died in 1739 without an offspring from his queen, a Madurai Nayak princess. Narendra Sinha's had nominated a brother of his Madura queen to succeed him; and he was crowned under the assumed title of Sri Vijaya Raja Sinha. Thus, Sri Vijaya Rajasinha succeeded the throne and established the Kandy Nayak line.

== Kandy before the Nayaks ==
The last king of the Kandy Mahanuwara dynasty was Vira Narendra Sinha who ruled from 1707 to 1739. This king ascended the throne in 1707 when he was seventeen and was considered to be a very pious and scholarly. In 1708 the king married a bride from Madurai Royal family, the daughter of Pitti Nayakkar. Again, in 1710, he married another bride from Madurai. He had no children by either of the queens. He also had a secondary Kandyan wife from noble family of Matale. They had a son. However, the children of the secondary wife were not considered heirs to the throne. The king also had a concubine from a high caste, who had a son with him named Unambuwe, and did survive. The bar to his succession was the lack of royal status in the mother.

Thus, the king nominated, as his successor, the brother of his first queen who had remained at the court ever since his sister married him. According to the law of succession that prevailed in Ceylon, the throne passed almost always from father to son, born of a mahesi or from brother to brother. However, when Narendra Sinha's brother-in-law succeeded the throne, the Sinhalese Kandyan aristocracy had no problem with this new form of succession. The practice of marrying princesses from Madurai is said to have come into occurrence as the Kandy kings insisted on consorts from the Suryavamsa lineage to grace their coronation and to produce heirs acceptable to the people.

== Monarchs ==
=== Sri Vijaya Rajasinha 1739–1747 ===
The Brother-in-law of King Vira Narendra Sinha, Narendra Singha's first wife's brother, from the Madurai Nayak house, ascended the throne of Kandy, as Sri Vijaya Rajasinha.

The new king, considered to be a man of considerable culture, devoted his entire attention to the furtherance of the majority religion Buddhism despite being a Hindu. He is said to have commissioned life sized images of Buddha in recumbent, standing and sitting postures to be cut in the rock caves in various parts of the country. His reign also marked several conflicts with the Dutch who were ruling the coastal provinces, based on trading issues. Sri Vijaya Rajasinha destroyed the churches and initiated a persecution against the Portuguese and Dutch, which was continued under Kirti Sri Rajasinha. It ceased only because the king considered that certain calamities which fell upon the country were due to his action.

He married a bride from the Royal family of Madurai.

==== Marriage alliance with Madurai royal family ====
When the king ascended the throne he sought a wife from South India. For this purpose he sent messengers to Madurai in 1739. Since the Madurai Nayaks had now lost the power and prestige they enjoyed in the days of Vijayaranga Chokkanatha, the family members thought it advisable and even desirable to accept the offer from the king of Kandy. Hence the family of Bangaru Thirumala, who was now residing in Vellaikuruchi Fort near Thirupachetiram in Sivaganga Zamin responded. Two brothers Rama Krishnappa Nayaka and Narenappa Nayaka, kinsmen of Bangaru Tirumala Nayaka meet the Kandyan envoys at Ramnad. Narenappa Nayaka had a daughter of marriageable age and agreed to the Kandyan request. The brothers with their families and some kins accompanied the envoys to Ceylon for the daughter's nuptial; settled in Kandy with their kith and kin. Narenappa Nayaka was destined to be not only the father-in-law of one king, but the father of the next two kings of Kandy; for his two sons, the one five or six years old in 1740, and the other still an infant were successively to succeed Sri Vijaya Rajasinha.

Sri Vijaya Rajasinha married another Madurai princess in 1747. Each bride brought a contingent of relatives with royal lineage ultimately making Kandy their permanent home.

The king, however, died childless soon after, having nominated as his successor, his eldest brother in-law who had been living in the court ever since his sister had married the king. Thus by this peculiar mode of succession the son of Narenappa Nayaka who claimed kingship with the ruling Madurai Nayak family now ascended the throne of Kandy as Kirti Sri Rajasinha.

=== Kirti Sri Rajasinha 1747–1782 ===
Kirti Sri Rajasinha was a prince from the Nayaks of Madurai royal family and brother-in-law to Sri Vijaya Raja Singha. He succeeded his brother-in-law to the throne in 1751.

He devoted the first few years of his reign to the advancement of literature and religion. The king, later with the Dutch assistance got down to learning Bhikkus from Siam (Thailand) for the purpose of advancing Buddhism in Sri Lanka, also building the Raja Maha Vihara (Gangarama) was built at Kandy. Kirti built the existing inner temple of the Sacred Tooth Relic, and caused the Mahavansa chronicle to be continued from the time of Parâkkamabâhu IV down to his own reign.

==== Attack on Dutch forts ====
In 1761 King Kirti Sri Rajasinha attacked the Dutch garrisons and forts at Matara, Katuwana, Tangalle, Marakade and Urubokke, completely destroying them, and killing Dutch while some surrendered and ended as prisoners.

In order to revenge the humiliation, the new Dutch governor Van Eck had immediate plans to attack Kandy, but the weakness in fortification and garrison forbade the Dutch. Later they did attach in 1764 and in 1765. Hence, in the early part of 1763 the Dutch were only consolidating their positions and gradually expelling Kandyans from the territories taken over from Dutch. Throughout 1763 the King continually sought peace and sent his envoys to discuss terms. The Governor wished the King to cede the three four and seven Korales and Puttlam and hand over the entire coastline of island to the Dutch. The king was not agreeable to any demand that diminished his sovereignty and was deliberately delaying a settlement hoping for help from the English in Madras after his discussion and negotiations with John Pybus 1762.

==== Meeting with the British ====
The King in mid-1762 sought help from George Pigot, Governor of Fort St George Madras for assistance. The British were eager to obtain the monopoly of trading in cinnamon, pepper, betel nut (puwak) from the Kandyan Kings also wanted to expel the Dutch from the coasts. A reason to call on the British for assistance by the Kandyan King in 1762 was that after the treaty of Paris, the Dutch poured troops into Sri Lanka. They were bent on capturing Kandy from six directions (1764). Anticipating such a scenario the King sent an envoy to the English Governor of Madras to assist him in expelling the Dutch. This envoy, a junior Kandyan Official in the military made a clandestine trip to Madras Fort, and the English responded by sending their councillor John Pybus.

John Pybus, a writer of the British East India Company, sailed to Kandy with a backup of five ships and about 200 armed men. A British vessel brought Pybus to Trincomalee on 5 May 1762. The Dutch knew of the arrival of Pybus through their spies and they were kept informed of his movements. Pybus took an exhausting covert trip to meet the King on 24 May 1762. After several talks without any conclusive decisions Pybus left after a month. The King gave him a ring, sword, a gold chain with breast jewels and left the country crossing the river at Puttalam pass while the Dissawa who accompanied Pybus presented the ships commander Samuel Cornish a gold chain and a ring in the name of King "Kirti Sri Rajasinha".

John Pybus in his notes described the King as a man of tolerable stature, reddish in complexion and very brisk in his movements. Pybus was amazed as to how the kandyans had managed to fight a war with Dutch and had captured Matara Dutch Fort. He wrote that "They had put every European to the sword except two officers who are now prisoners of the country."

==== Marriage ====
The Kandy King, Kirti Sri Rajasinha (Kirti Sri Maha Raja), married two daughters of Vijaya Manan Naicker, the grandson of Vijaya Raghava Nayaka of Tanjore and also brought some dispossessed Nayaks of Tanjore to live in Kandy. He also married the daughter of one Nadukattu Sami Nayakkar in 1749. He further married three more Nayakkar queens from Madurai, but had no children from them. He had six daughters and two sons by his Sinhalese wife (Yakada Doli), daughter of the late Dissave (Headman) of Bintenna and granddaughter of the blind and aged Mampitiya Dissave. Both his sons survived the king and his daughters' married Nayakkar relatives of the king. Mampitiya's sons claim for the throne was overlooked and the choice fell on the king's brother who was living in court.

The king died on 2 January 1782, of the injuries caused two months before by a fall from his horse after a reign of 35 years which the people saw as a great religious revival, and had a sentimental attachment to the King.

=== Sri Rajadhi Raja Singha 1782–1798 ===
Brother of Kirti Sri Rajasinha, the new king who ascended the throne as Sri Rajadhi Rajasinha. He came from Madurai as a child along with his brother. Hence he was raised as Kandyan and Sinhalese; emerging as a brilliant pupil of the Malwatte Temple's chief Prelate at that time. He was quite a sophisticated person and learned many languages amongst which were Pali and Sanskrit. A lavish patron of Buddhism, he was a great aficionado of poetry and he himself was a poet.

He died childless in 1798 without nominating a successor. The burden fell on Pilimatalava, the first Adigar (Prime Minister) Pilimatalawe, an able, ambitious and intriguing chief, to select a successor to the vacant throne. The controversial Adigar was also seen as one of the main reason for the demise of the dynasty.

=== Sri Vikrama Rajasinha 1798–1815 ===
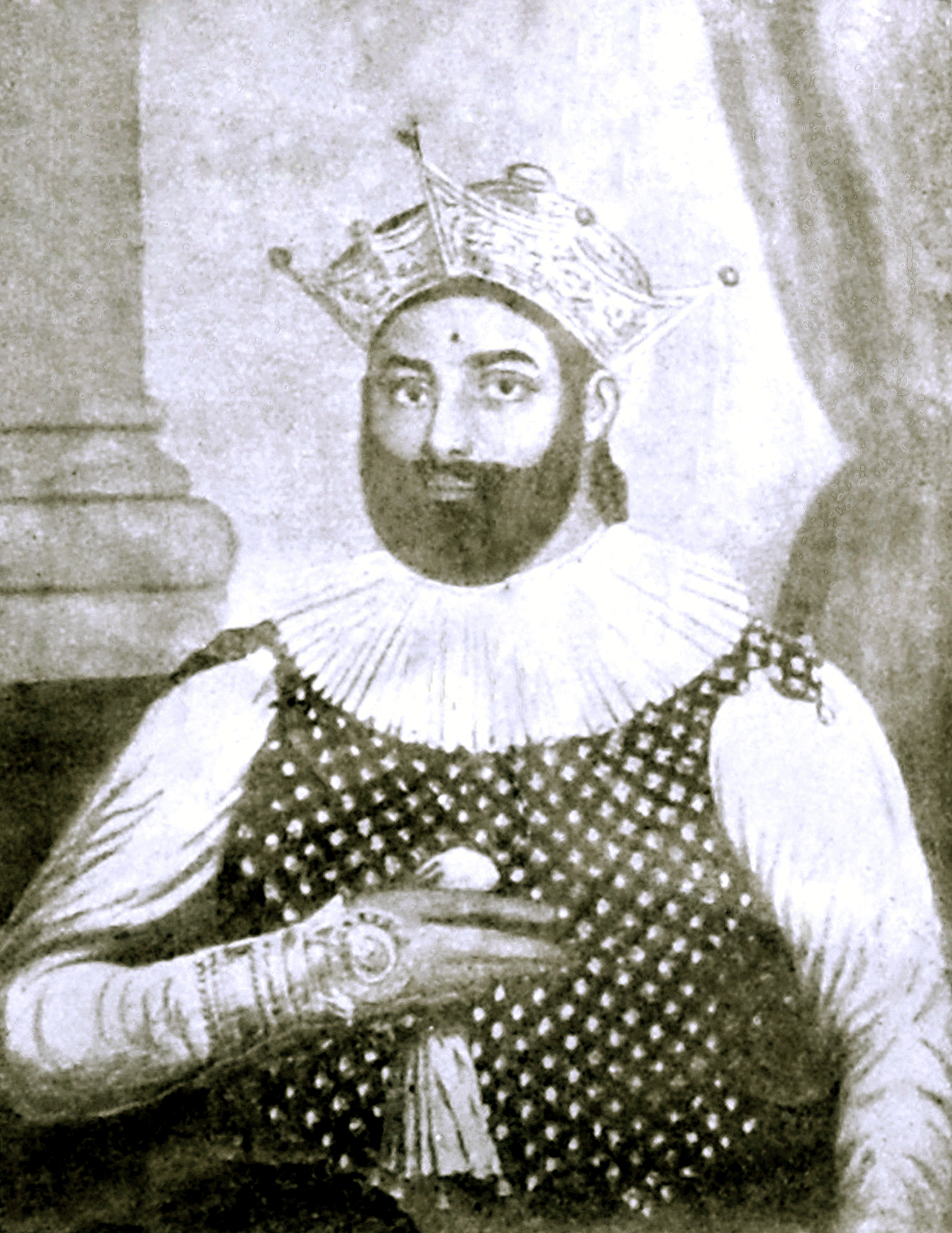
His Majesty Sri Vikrama Rajasinha, Last King of Ceylon

The next King who ascended the throne was Prince Kannasamy, the former Kings' nephew, barely 18 years old. He was crowned under the title of Sri Vikrama Rajasinha. He would also be the last King of the Kandy Nayakar dynasty and the last of Sri Lanka. During his time the British colony was fully established in other parts of Sri Lanka.

There was a rival claimant to succeed King Sri Rajadhi Rajasinha, the brother of Queen Upendramma, who had a stronger claim. However, Pilimatalawe, the first Adigar (prime Minister) choose the South Indian Prince to the Kandyan throne, with reportedly deep-seated plans to usurp the throne to set a new dynasty of his own. The young King, upon ascending the throne, faced many conspiracies and reigned through one of the most turbulent periods in Sri Lanka's history.

==== Internal conflict ====
During his time, the British who had succeeded the Dutch in the Maritime Provinces had not interfered in the politics of the Kandy. But Pilimatalava, the first Adigar of the King, started covert operations with the British to provoke the King into acts of aggression, which would give the British an excuse to seize the Kingdom. The Adigar manipulated the king into beginning a military conflict with the British, who had gained a strong position in the coastal provinces. War was declared and on 22 March 1803 the British entered Kandy with no resistance, Sri Vikrama Rajasinha having fled. The adigar massacred the British garrison in Kandy in June and restored the king to the throne. Pilimitalava plotted to overthrow the King and seize the crown for himself, but his plot was discovered, and, having been pardoned on two previous occasions, he was executed.

The disgraced adigar was replaced by his nephew, Ehelepola, who soon came under suspicion of following his uncle in plotting the overthrow of Sri Vikrama Rajasinha. A rebellion instigated by Ehalepola was suppressed, after which he then fled to Colombo and joined the British. After failing to surrender (after 3 weeks of notice), the exasperated king dismissed Ehelepola, confiscated his lands, and ordered the imprisonment and execution of his wife and children. A propagandised account of the execution was widely circulated by sympathisers.

Ehelepola fled to British-controlled territory, where he persuaded the British that Sri Vikrama Rajasinha's tyranny deserved a military intervention. The pretext was provided by the seizure of a number of British merchants, who were detained on suspicion of spying and were tortured, killing several of them. An invasion was duly mounted and advanced to Kandy without resistance, reaching the city on 10 February 1815. On 2 March, the kingdom was ceded to the British under a treaty called the Kandyan Convention.

==== Exile and death ====
On the 2nd of March, the kingdom was ceded to the British under a treaty called the Kandyan Convention. Sri Vikrama Rajasinha was captured and sent along with his family and attendants as a royal prisoner by the British to Vellore Fort in southern India. A son was born to him while he was in exile but he died without issue. The King then adopted the son of his daughter as his own son who was titled Alagia Manawala Sinhala Raja. During Sri Vikrama Rajasinha's time as a royal prisoner in Vellore Fort the erstwhile King received a privy purse, which his descendants continued to receive from the Government of Ceylon until it was abolished in 1965.

Sri Wikrama Rajasinha died of dropsy on 30 January 1832 aged 52 years.

== Public works ==
For centuries Kandy, originally known as Senkadagala, has been the bastion of Sri Lanka's culture and its spiritual centre. The palace complex at Kandy includes Sri Lanka's most venerated shrine, the Dalada Maligawa or Temple of the Sacred Tooth Relic.

Raja Maha Vihara (Gangarama) was built at Kandy by the second Nayak king Kirti Sri Rajasinha while his successor Sri Rajadhi Rajasinha was a lavish patron of Buddhism. The first Nayak king Sri Vijaya Rajasinha is noted for various erection of Buddhist statues throughout the Kingdom. The Kandy Lake overlooking Kandy was commissioned by Sri Vikrama Rajasinha.

The Kandy Nayaks are credited for establishing numerous Vishnu temples in Sri Lanka dedicated to their clan deity Vishnu. In Sinhalese culture, Vishnu, hailed as Upulvan, is said to have been entrusted the task of protection of the island of Lanka by Lord Buddha himself. Thus even after conversion to Buddhism, the kings were devoted to Lord Vishnu as a part of veneration of the protector of the Buddhist island.

== Descendants ==
Social reformer Pattukkottai Alagiri was a descendant of the Royal Family of Kandy.

== See also ==
- List of monarchs of Sri Lanka
- Mahavamsa
- History of Sri Lanka

== Sources ==
- Robert Binning, A Journal of Two Years' Travel in Persia, Ceylon, etc. Volume 1. (Wm. H. Allen & Co., 1857)
- Horace Hayman Wilson, The history of British India, from 1805 to 1835. (James Madden, 1858)
