= Vijaya Kuweni =

- Sinhala: විජය කුවේණි
- Directed by: Sugath Samarakoon
- Written by: Sugath Samarakoon
- Produced by: Gayan Ranadheera
- Starring: Dulani Anuradha; Roger Seneviratne; Cletus Mendis
- Cinematography: Ayesmantha Hettiarachchi
- Edited by: Ajith Ramanayake
- Music by: Nadeeka Guruge
- Distributed by: CEL circuit
- Release date: 6 May 2012
- Running time: 138 minutes
- Country: Sri Lanka
- Language: Sinhala

Vijaya Kuweni (Sinhala: විජය කුවේණි) is a 2012 Sri Lankan Sinhala epic biographical history film directed by Sugath Samarakoon and produced by Gayan Ranadheera. It stars Dulani Anuradha and Roger Seneviratne in lead roles along with Cletus Mendis and Buddhadasa Vithanarachchi. Music composed by Nadeeka Guruge. It is the 1162nd Sri Lankan film in the Sinhala cinema.

The film is about the legends of Ceylon's first king and his yaksha clan queen. The film successfully completed 50 days. The DVD and the screenplay of the film was released in December 2013.

== Cast ==
- Dulani Anuradha as Kuweni
- Roger Seneviratne as King Vijaya
- Buddhadasa Vithanarachchi as Anurdha Purohita
- Cletus Mendis as Upatissa Purohita
- Sarath Dikkumbura as Vijitha amathi
- Rinsley Weeraratna as Uruwela amathi
- Mervin Silva as Yaksha chief
- Sandun Wijesiri as King Sinhabahu
- Thilak Kumara Rathnayake as Juthindar Senadhipathi
- Wilson Karunaratne as Chief of Yaksha clan
- Sumith Mudannayake as Kalasena
- Anura Dharmasiriwardena as Ranadheegha
- Wasanthi Ranwala as Seesapatika
- Rohitha B. Perera as Udeni amathi
- Rupun Ranadheera as Jeevahatta
- Amandi Sanjana as Disala
- Susil Perera as Prathidhara
- Sandun Wijesiri as Sinhabahu
- Sumith Mudannayaka as King Kalasena
- Sanjaya Samarakoon as Yaksha Kumaru
- Miyuri Samarasinghe

== Awards ==
- 2013 SIGNIS Award for the Best Actress - Dulani Anuradha

== See also ==
- List of Asian historical drama films
