= Patacara =

Buddhist monastic

Most venerable Bhikkhuni Paṭacārā
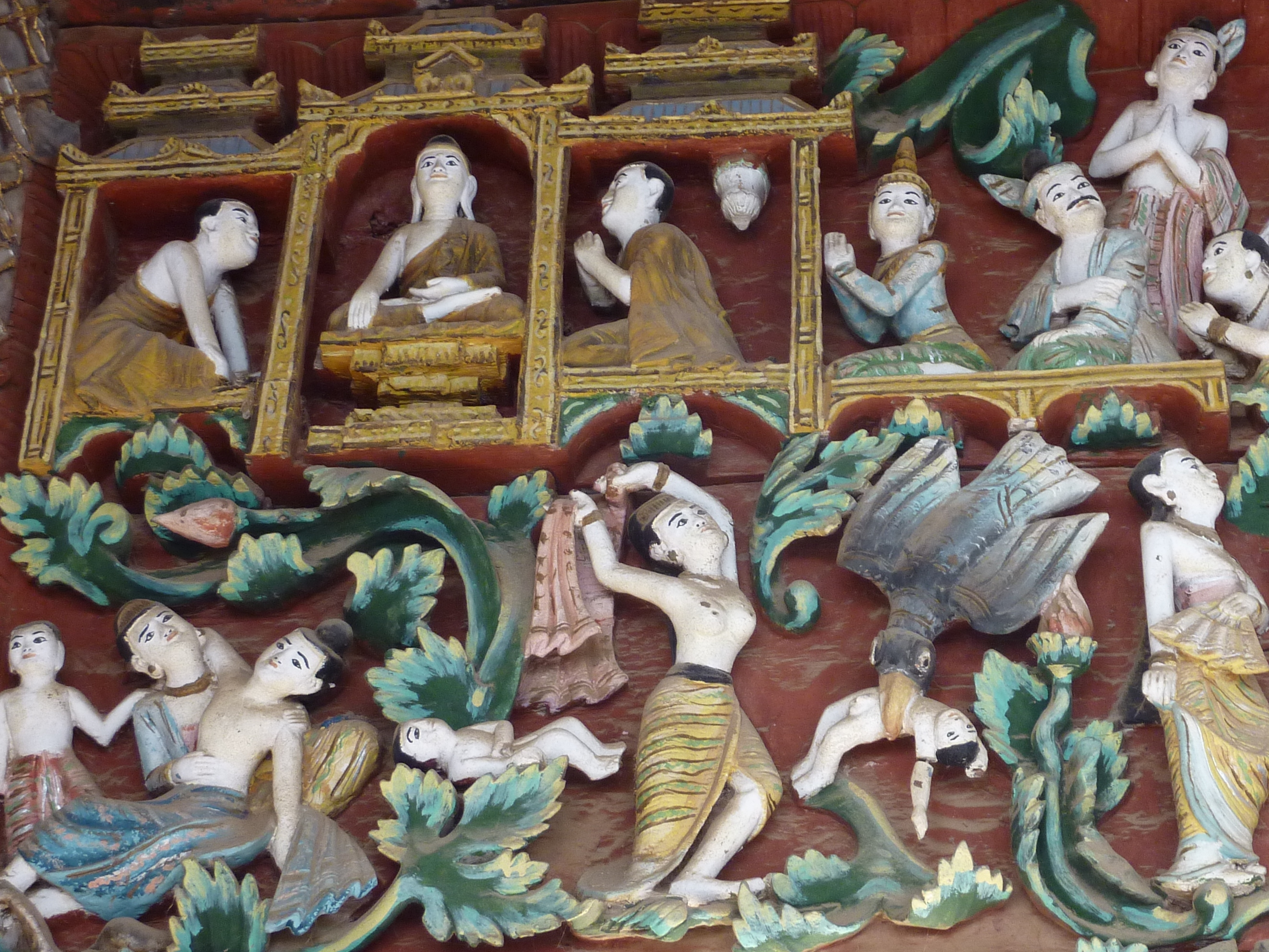
- Tales of Bhikkhuni Patacara Theri, Shwezigon, Bagan, Myanmar.
- Title: Foremost among exponent in vinaya

Personal life
- Born: 6th century BCE Savatthi, Kosala Kingdom, India
- Children: 2
- Occupation: bhikkhuni

Religious life
- Religion: Buddhism

Senior posting
- Teacher: Gautama Buddha

Paṭacārā or Patachara was a notable female figure in Buddhism, described in the Pali Canon. Among the female disciples of Gautama Buddha, she was the foremost exponent of the Vinaya, the rules of monastic discipline. She lived during the 6th century BCE in what is now Bihar and Uttar Pradesh in India. The story of childbirth and loss below has been attributed to Patacara in some Buddhist texts and in others has been attributed to another woman, Kisa Gotami

== Early life ==
Patacara was described as the beautiful daughter of a very wealthy merchant of Savatthi, in the Kosala Kingdom. Her previous name was Roopwati, the most beautiful girl of the whole town. Her over-protective parents used to love her dearly and provide her with every luxury. She also had a younger brother named Bharadwaj. Though she had everything, she was unhappy because of loneliness. She falls in love with one of her parents' servants Amarshanath, a young, good-looking and innocent boy, who had a lower social status. But Amarsh did not have any feelings for her initially. One fine day they go to a forest where they have sexual intercourse, after she wishes for it. At the same time, her parents arrange her marriage with Prince Revant, a handsome young man from a neighbouring kingdom. Roopvati finds out that she is pregnant with Amarsh's child. She decides to elope secretly with him. But Amarsh denies to betray his owners. She then requests him to escape with her before she is married off or everyone knows about her pregnancy. As planned, both Amarsh and Roopwati secretly elope from the palace with some money and ornaments, and reach a small village, far away from the palace to lead a simple but happy life. Then they settle down in a hut of a farmer. And they lead a struggling life to earn bread, without any luxury, but love each other very much. Her family gets furious after they come to know that their daughter has a relationship with a servant and both have eloped.

== Childbirth ==
During her pregnancy, Roopwathie begged her husband to take her to her parents' house to give birth there, as was the tradition. She justified this by saying that parents always have a love for their child, no matter what has happened. Roopwathie's husband refused, stating that her parents would surely torture or imprison him. Realizing that he would not accompany her, she decided to go by herself. When he found out about this, he followed her and tried to persuade her to return, but in vain. So finally he agreed to accompany her. Before they could reach Savatthi, she delivered a baby boy. As there was no more reason to go to Savatthi, they turned back and resumed their life in the village.

After a few years, Patacara became pregnant with her second child. Again, she requested her husband to take her home to her parents and when he refused, she began the journey by herself, taking her son with her. Her husband followed. She went to labour and she asked her husband to find some shelter. A heavy storm had hit the place. He went to search for some wood where he was bitten by a poisonous snake and died instantly. Meanwhile, Patacara gave birth to her second son. The next morning, she found her husband lying dead, his body rigid. Distraught, she blamed herself for his death.

== Loss of family ==
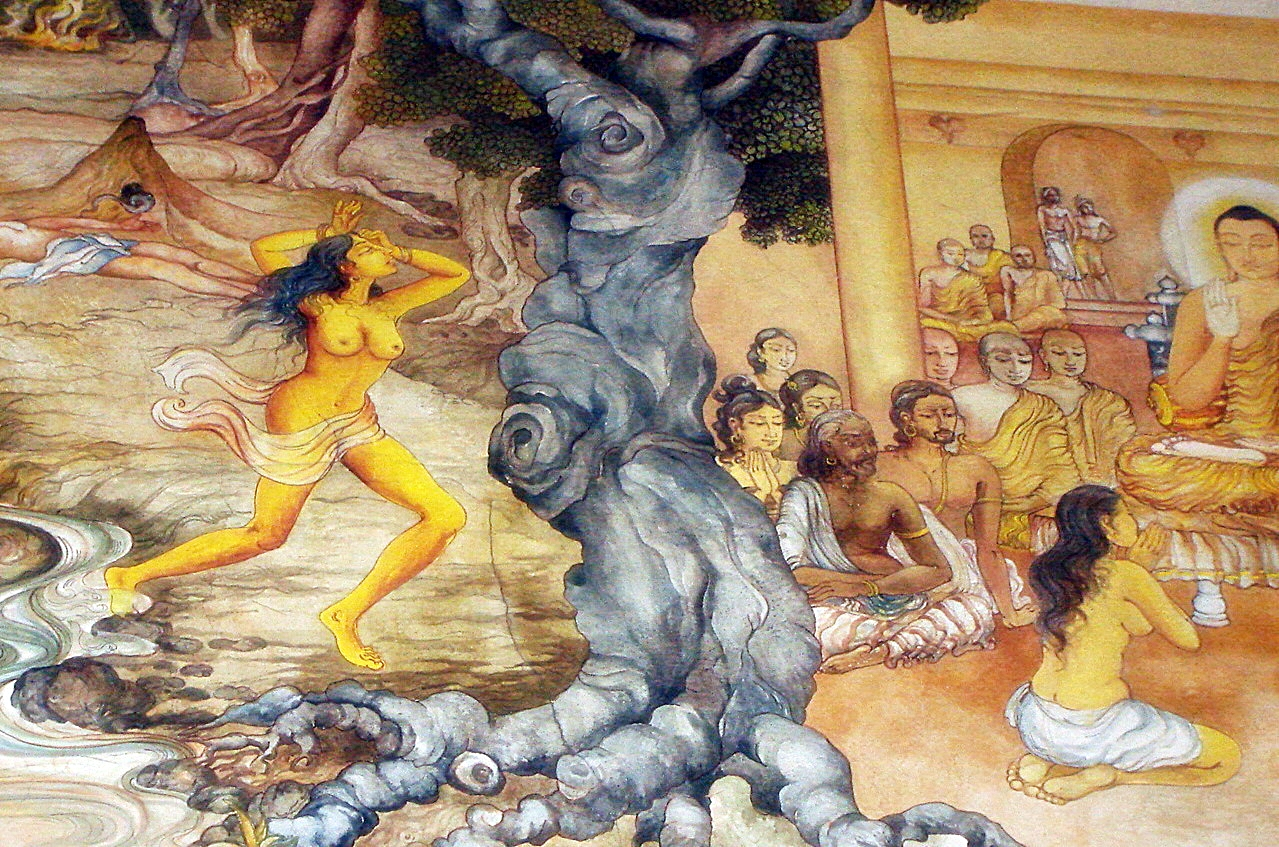
Patacara running naked due to grief, pain and sorrow over loss of her family members

She continued on her journey to Savatthi, but when she came to the river Aciravati, it was overflowing due to heavy rain. Unable to wade across with both children, she left the older child on the shore and carried the baby across to the other shore, before returning to take the first son. When she was midway through her return, a vulture swooped on the baby and flew off. Hearing his mother's screaming, the elder son believed Patacara was calling him and entered the water. He was swept off by the strong current. She had lost her husband and both children. She was devastated. Yet, she continued towards the city, in hope of meeting her parents. But on her way she was informed that her parents and brother had been killed after their house collapsed during the storm. Completely shattered and utterly depressed, Patacara becomes insane and then she crazily starts to scream and undress herself. The people used to throw the stones at her, called her crazy woman and tortured her, while nobody recognized who she was previously. She grew more aggressive and insane day-by-day. Whenever any sympathetic person used to try and cover her nude body with clothes, she used to tear those and scream at them. She gradually became unaware of the importance and conduct of clothes which was a great challenge to the norms and values of society. Thus came the name 'Patacara'. People used to hurl abuses at her. She ended up being completely ostracized from the village.

== Buddhist life ==
At that time the Buddha was staying at the Jetavana, Anathapindika's monastery. Patacara, after running through Savatthi naked and disconsolate, prostrated at the feet of the Buddha, describing her family tragedies. The Buddha explained this using Buddhist doctrines, and Patacara immediately understood the nature of impermanence. When she was asked to tell her actual name, she felt awkward as her actual name was 'Roopwati' which means beauty and her condition was completely opposite of her name. Hence, she introduced herself as 'Patacara' (which means 'cloak-walker'). She thus became a sotapanna, the first stage of aryahood. Then she became a bhikkhuni and soon attained arhat. The Buddha said that she was the foremost Keeper of the Vinaya amongst the Nuns, and thus the female counterpart of the monk Upali. Her interest in the "Rules of Conduct" of the monastic life was attributed to her reflections on her former indulgences.

== Adaptions ==
- The Nepali novel Patachari, based on Patacara's whole life, was written by Nepali author and artist Ashok Mansingh and published in 2009. It describes the complete life story of Patacara with more original details and some colourful pictures.
- The Nepalbhasa film Patachara was released in 2010, the story based on the life of Patacara, starring Nepalese stars Karma and Melina Manandhar.
- In Sri Lanka a Sinhalese Film "Patachara" was screened in 1964 in which Sandhya Kumari played the main role. The film depicted the ancient Patachara katha wasthu. later in 2016 another Sinhalese film Ape Kaalaye Patachara was screened in which, Dulani Anuradha played the role., based on a Patachara-like-story.
- In 2021, Nepali author and critic Diwakar Regmi wrote an epic Patachara, in Nepali पटाचारा. Published by Lulu publication, the metrical composition poignantly portrays the life of the title character, focusing especially on her transformation.
