= Sangili (2019 film) =

2019 Sri Lankan film directed by Lalith Pannipitiya

- Sinhala: සංගිලි
- Directed by: Lalith Pannipitiya
- Written by: A.H. Karunarathna
- Produced by: JMV Films
- Starring: Dulani Anuradha; Saranga Disasekara; Sanath Gunathilake
- Cinematography: Nilantha Chularatne
- Edited by: Pravin Jayaratne
- Music by: Saman Panapitiya
- Distributed by: CEL Theaters
- Release date: 18 January 2019
- Running time: 180 minutes
- Country: Sri Lanka
- Language: Sinhala

Sangile (Sinhala: සංගිලි) is a 2019 Sri Lankan drama film directed by Lalith Pannipitiya and co-produced by G. Dharmarathna and K.G. Shirani Dias for JMV Films. It stars Dulani Anuradha and Saranga Disasekara in lead roles along with Sanath Gunathilake and Veena Jayakody. Music composed by Saman Panapitiya. It is the 1320th Sri Lankan film in the Sinhalese cinema.

The film has been shot around the Kalundewa village in Matale district in 2009. The production cost is 8 million SLR.

== Plot ==
Sangele (Dulani) is a girl who lives alone in a village of people . People in the city are trying to get close to her some even making sexual advances. Punchi Malli (Sanath) is very attracted to Sangile, even though he is married. Meanwhile, a hard working young Sunimal (Saranga) falls in love with Sangile. Punchi Malli was falsely accused in due to a rumor and sent to jail. During this time, Punchi Malli raped Sangile and Punchi Malli's wife (Veena) get to know about the hidden truth. She tried to blame Sangile for dirty works, however Punchi Malli punished her. Sangile gets pregnant and story continues.

== Cast ==
- Dulani Anuradha as Sangile
- Saranga Disasekara as Sunimal
- Sanath Gunathilake as Punchi Malli
- Veena Jayakody as Punchi malli's wife
- Rebeka Nirmali as Sangile's mother
- Wimal Kumara de Costa as Wimale
- Nalin Pradeep Udawela as Monk
- Vasanthi Chathurani as Lady monk
- Kumuduni Adikari as Matchmaker
- Neil Alles
- Mohan Hettiarachchi
- Lionel Wickrama as Village officer
- Anusha Sonali as Sun's ex-wife

== Songs ==
The film consists with two songs.

No.	Title	Lyrics	Singer(s)	Length
1.	"Mandaram Wahi Ahasa Pura"	Saman Panapitiya	Indika Upamali, Saman Lenin
2.	"Udu Mahale Mal Wahi Wahala"	Saman Panapitiya	Nelu Adhikari, Saman Lenin, Saman Panapitiya
