= Andare =

Court jester

Andare අන්දරේ
- Born: c. 1742; Matara, Sri Lanka
- Died: 1782; Udamalala, Hambanthota
- Other names: Sadda Vidda Palanga Pathira සද්ද විද්ද පළඟ පතිර Muthukumarana මුතුකුමාරණ
- Known for: Court Jester

Andare (Sinhala: අන්දරේ) was a court jester employed by the King Keerthi Sri Rajasinghe (c. 1742 - 1782) in Sri Lanka. He used to be an accomplished poet who could instantly compose verses, to suit any ongoing situation. Despite being a mere joker, the tales suggest Andare had a superior intellect that aided him in turning situations to his favour. He was also a skilled archer who could allegedly shoot down a frog croaking in a pond at night by the sound it makes, for which feat he eventually received his title, "Sadda Vidda Palanga Pathira", from the king. After his death he was buried in the town of Udamalala, where is tomb can be found on the banks of the Udamalala wewa. Many Sinhala stories are about his life. He was cunning since the beginning. Two stories are about his childhood. The first one is when he ate some oil cakes and said he gave them to a hungry man, who was Andare himself. The second one is when his mom told him “ගොනෙක් වගේ ඉන්න” before a wedding. She meant ‘behave well’ but it literally translated to ‘behave like an ox’, so Andare did behave like an ox.

Manel Ratnatunge in her book Tales from Sri Lanka: Folk and History captures two Andare stories. The first story (Chapter 1) is about how Andare was summoned by the Chief Minister one day, to relate stories because the Minister found it difficult to fall asleep. A sleepy Andare finally lost his cool and blurted out " Either this fool must sleep or let me sleep". The second story (Chapter 2) is titled "How Andare threw the hill". A farmer wanted a huge stone in his field removed. Andare volunteered on the condition that he be fed rice and black fowl curry for three months. On the appointed day he looked at the large audience and said, " Come on, all of you. Come and lift the hill and place it on my shoulder. Then I will throw it."
