= Sri Vikrama Rajasinha =

King of Kandy from 1798 to 1815

Sri Vikrama Rajasinha ශ්‍රී වික්‍රම රාජසිංහ
- Bhupathi; Lankeshwara; Thrisinhaladheeshwara
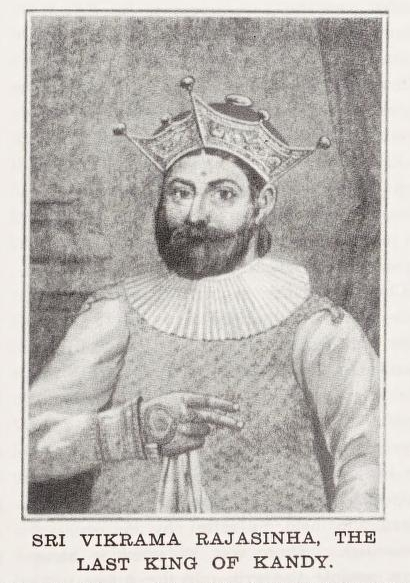
- Sri Vikrama Rajasinha, King of Kandy.

King of Kandy
- Reign: 17 July 1798 – 10 February 1815
- Coronation: 1798
- Predecessor: Rajadhi Rajasinha
- Successor: Kingdom abolished (George III as King of British Ceylon)
- Born: 1780; Kandy, Kingdom of Kandy, Sri Lanka
- Died: 30 January 1832 (aged 51); Vellore Fort, Tamil Nadu, India
- Spouse: Sri Venakatha Rangammal Devi (m. 1798): Venakatha Jammal; Venakatha Ammal; Muttu Kannamma; Pilimathalawe
- Issue: Prince Rajadhi Rajasingha (d. 1843); Princess Raja Letchumi (d. 1856); Princess Raja Nachiar (d. 1860); Princess Sinhala Gauri; Princess Rajaratne Kamsalya
- House: Nayaks of Kandy
- Father: Sri Venkatha Perumal
- Mother: Subbamma Nayak
- Religion: Theravada Buddhism and Shaivite Hinduism

Sri Vikrama Rajasinha (Sinhala:ශ්‍රී වික්‍රම රාජසිංහ, Tamil:ஸ்ரீ விக்கிரம ராஜசிங்கன்; 1780 – 30 January 1832), born Kannasamy Nayak, was the last of four kings to rule the Kingdom of Kandy in Sri Lanka. Being crowned king in 1798 with the backing of Pilamathalawe Adikaram, his capture by the British in 1815 effectively concluded the 2,300-year Sinhalese monarchy on the island. The Nayak Kings were of Telugu origin and practiced Shaivite Hinduism and were patrons of Theravada Buddhism. The Nayak rulers played a huge role in reviving Buddhism in the island. They spoke Telugu and Tamil, and used Tamil as the court language in Kandy alongside Sinhala.

The king was eventually deposed by the British government under the terms of the Kandyan Convention in 1815, ending over 2,300 years of domination by the Sinhalese crown on the island. The island was incorporated into the British Empire, and Sri Vikrama Rajasinha was succeeded by George III, as monarch of British Ceylon.

== Early life ==
Prior to his coronation in 1798, Sri Vikrama Rajasinha was known as Prince Kannasamy Naidu. He was a member of the Madurai Nayak Dynasty and the nephew and successor of Sri Rajadhi Rajasinha. He succeeded his uncle as the King of Kandy in 1798 at the age of eighteen.

== Reign ==
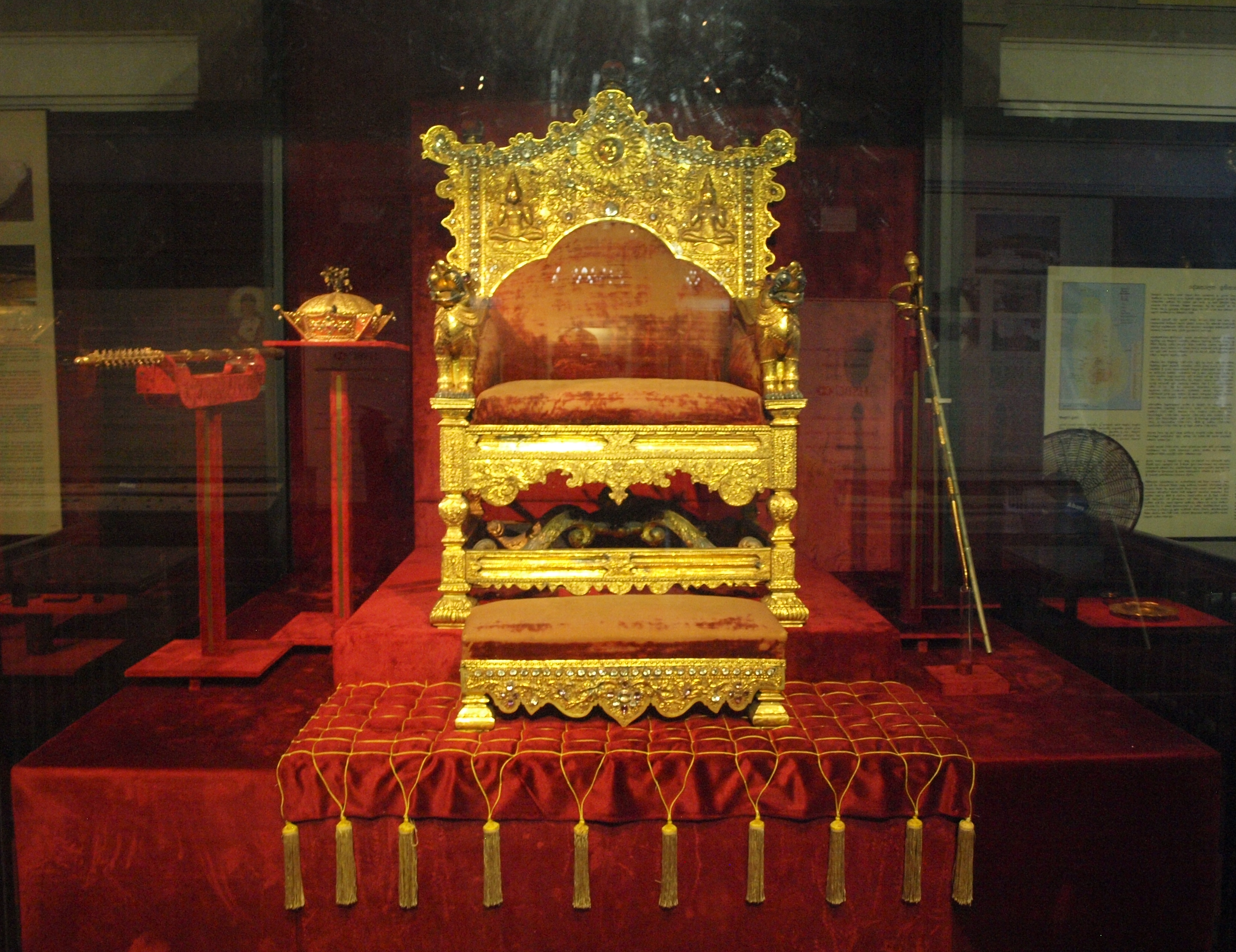
The Throne of Kandyan Kings.

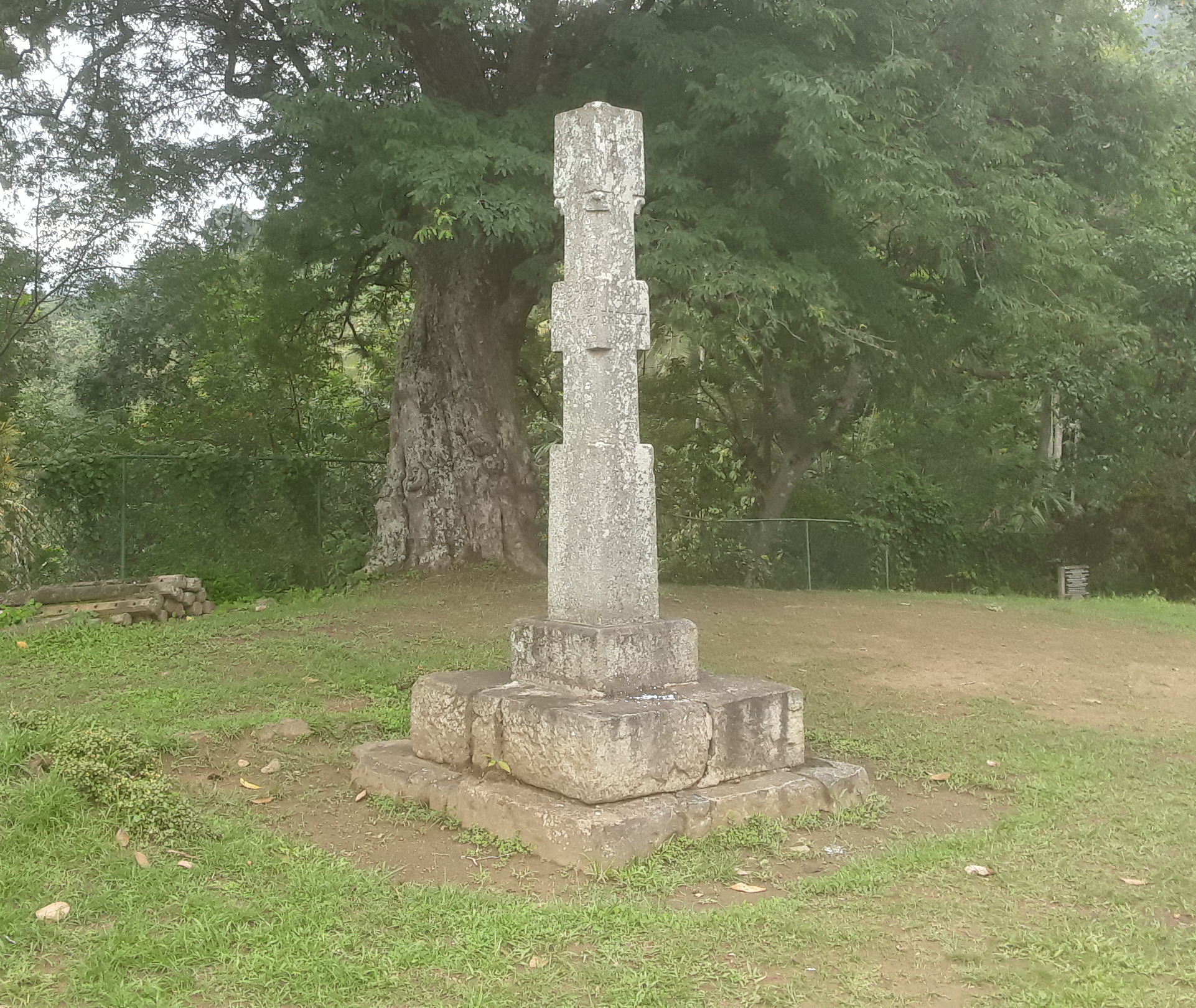
Bomure Memorial.

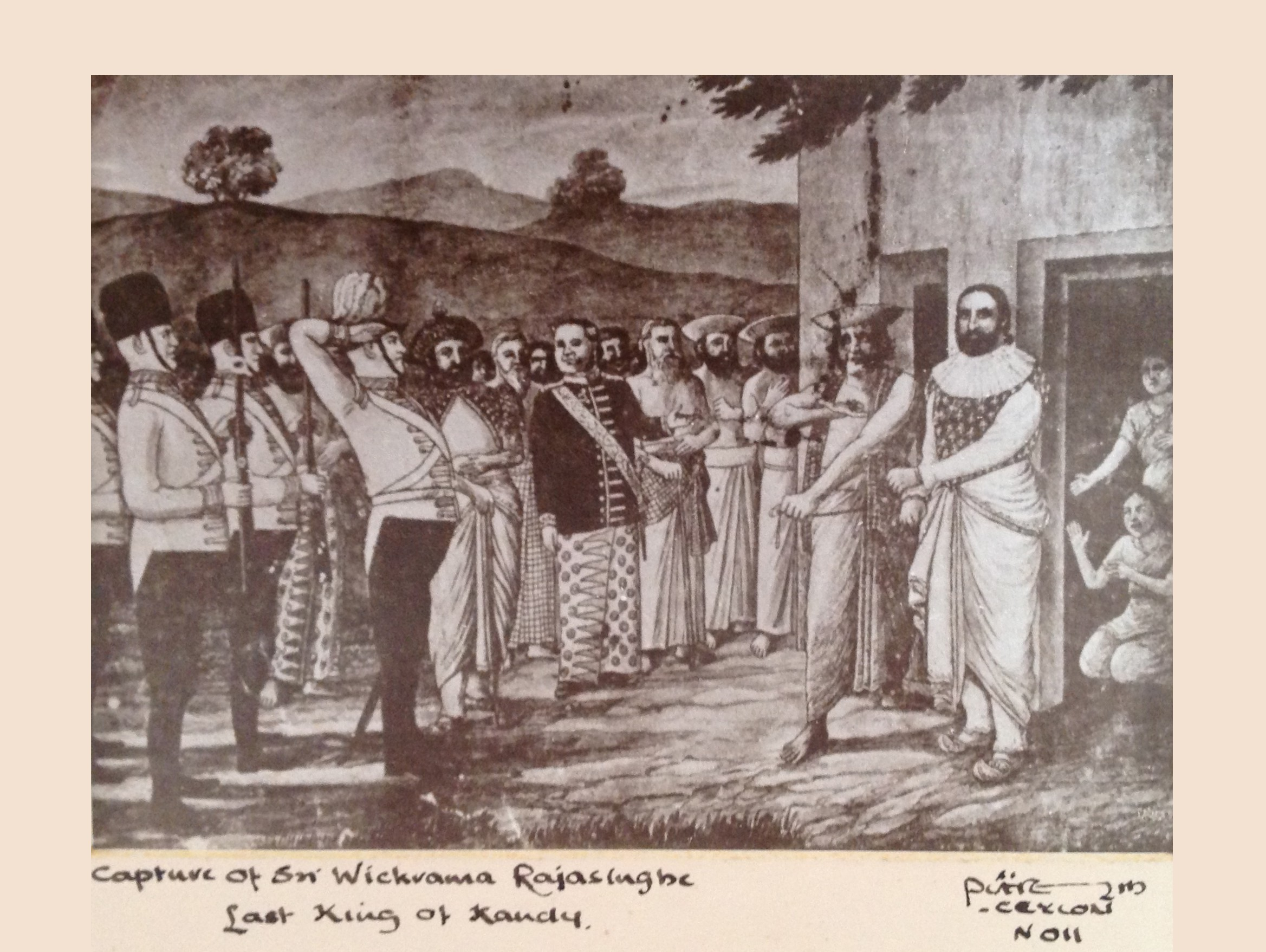
Capture of HM Rajasinha in 1815.

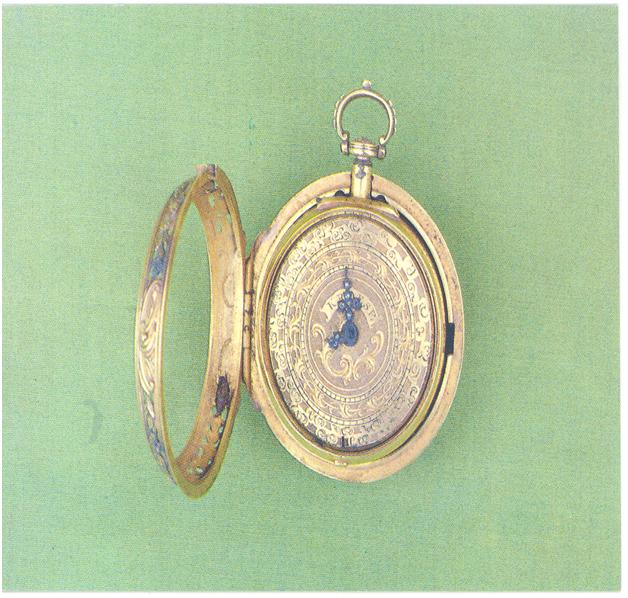
The pocket watch of Sri Wickrama Rajasinghe.

=== Early reign ===
There was a rival claimant to succeed Sri Rajadhi Rajasinha, the brother of Queen Upendrama, Muthuswamy, who had a stronger claim. However, Pilimatalauwa, the first Adigar (prime minister), chose Prince Kannasamy, reportedly with deep-seated plans to usurp the throne to set up a dynasty of his own. Sri Vikrama Rajasinha was faced with numerous conspiracies to overthrow him and reigned through one of the most turbulent periods in Sri Lanka's history.

=== Internal conflict ===
During his time, the British who had succeeded the Dutch in the Maritime Provinces had not interfered in the politics of the Kingdom of Kandy. But Pilimatalauwa, the first Adigar of the King, desiring British control over the island, covertly worked with the British administration to provoke the King into acting aggressively towards them in order to give Britain a casus belli against the Kandyan Kingdom. The Adigar manipulated the King into starting a military conflict with the British, who had gained a strong position in the coastal provinces. War was declared and on 22 March 1803, the British entered Kandy with no resistance, Sri Vikrama Rajasinha having fled. The Adigar massacred the British garrison in Kandy in June and restored the King to the throne. Pilimitalava plotted to overthrow the King and seize the crown for himself, but his plot was discovered, and, having been pardoned on two previous occasions, he was executed.

The disgraced Adigar was replaced by his nephew, Ehelepola Nilame, who soon came under suspicion of following his uncle in plotting the overthrow of Sri Vikrama Rajasinha. A rebellion instigated by Ehalepola was suppressed, after which he fled to Colombo and joined the British. After failing to surrender (after 3 weeks of notice), the exasperated King dismissed Ehelepola, confiscated his lands, and ordered the imprisonment and execution of his wife and children. A propagandised account of the execution was widely circulated by sympathisers.

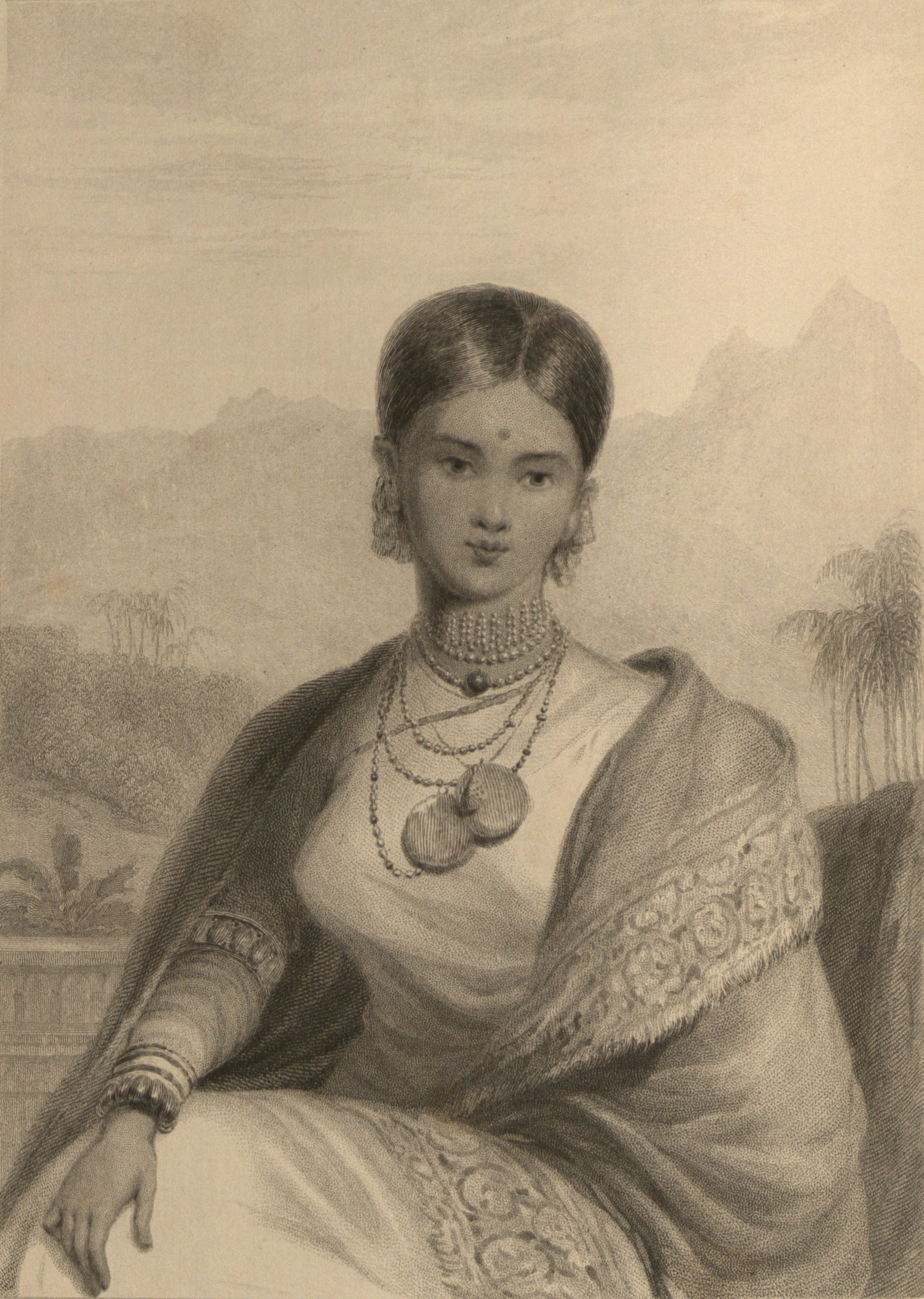
Rangammal Devi, Queen Consort. Drawn by William Daniell in the 1800s.

Ehelepola fled to British-controlled territory, where he persuaded the British that Sri Vikrama Rajasinha's tyranny deserved a military intervention. The pretext was provided by the seizure of a number of British merchants, who were detained on suspicion of spying and were tortured, killing several of them. An invasion was duly mounted and advanced to Kandy without resistance, reaching the city on 10 February 1815. On 2 March, the Kingdom was ceded to the British under a treaty called the Kandyan Convention.

Regarding the King's reign, the historian Louis Edmund Blaze states that "He was not as ardent a patriot as his immediate successors; nor did he show those mental and moral qualities which enabled former Kings to hold their own against rebellion and invasion. To say he was cruel does not mean much, for cruel Kings and nobles were not rare in those days; and it is questionable whether all the cruel deeds attributed to Sri Vickrama Rajasinha were of his own devising or done by his authority. It might be more fair to regard him as a weak tool in the hands of designing chiefs than as the monster of cruelty, which it is an idle fashion with some writers to call him. He did a lot to beautify his capital. The lake and the Octagon in Kandy have always been considered the work of the King."

== Arms ==
Civil and Royal Standard of Sri Vikrama Rajasinha.

== Death ==
On 2 March 1815, the Kingdom was ceded to Britain and Sri Vikrama Rajasinha was deposed and taken as a royal prisoner by the British to Vellore Fort in southern India. He lived on a small allowance given to him with his two queens by the British colonial administration. He died of dropsy on 30 January 1832, aged 52 years.

His death anniversary has been commemorated as Guru Pooja by descendants at Muthu Mandabam, Vellore, Tamil Nadu, India, since 2011.

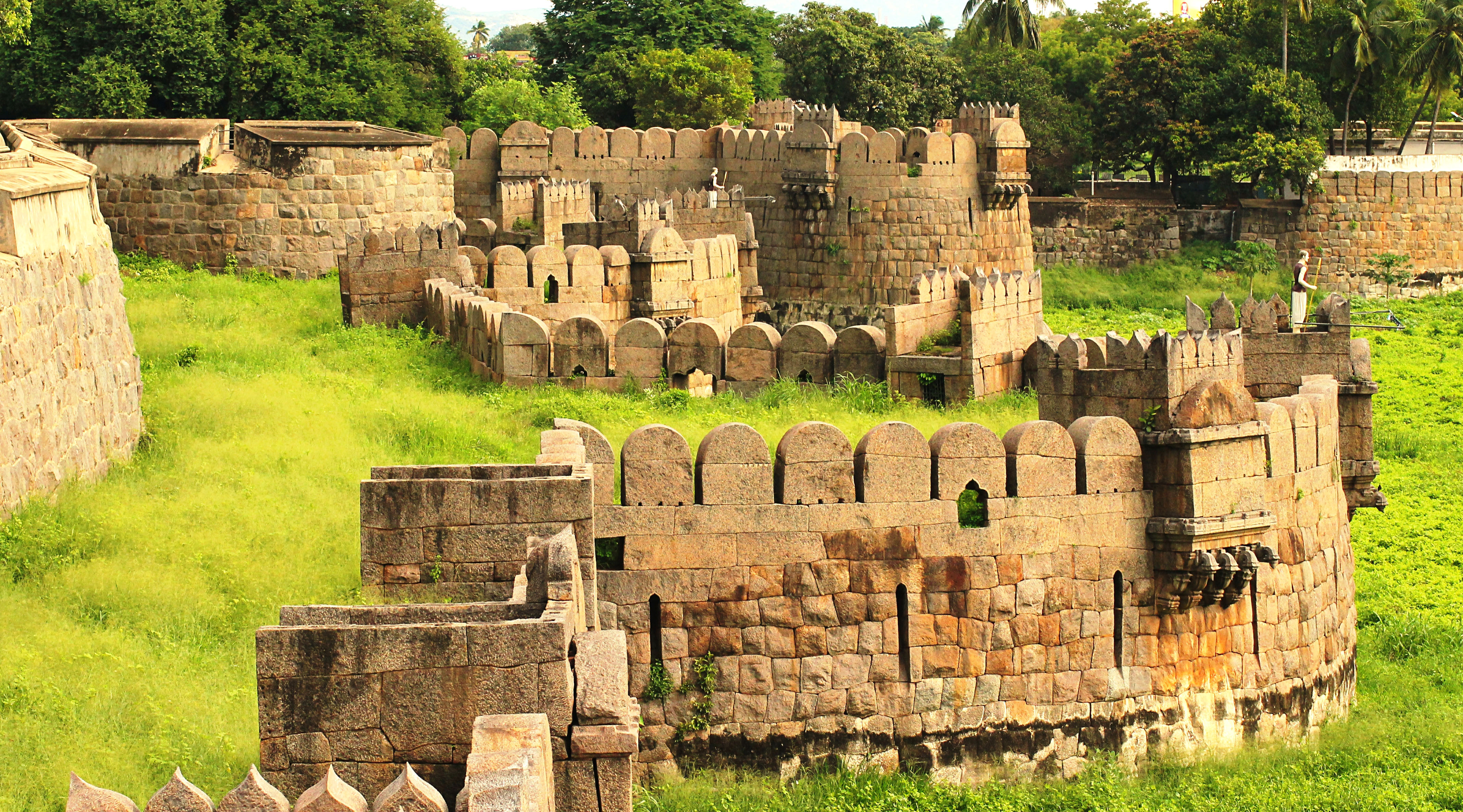
Vellore Fort

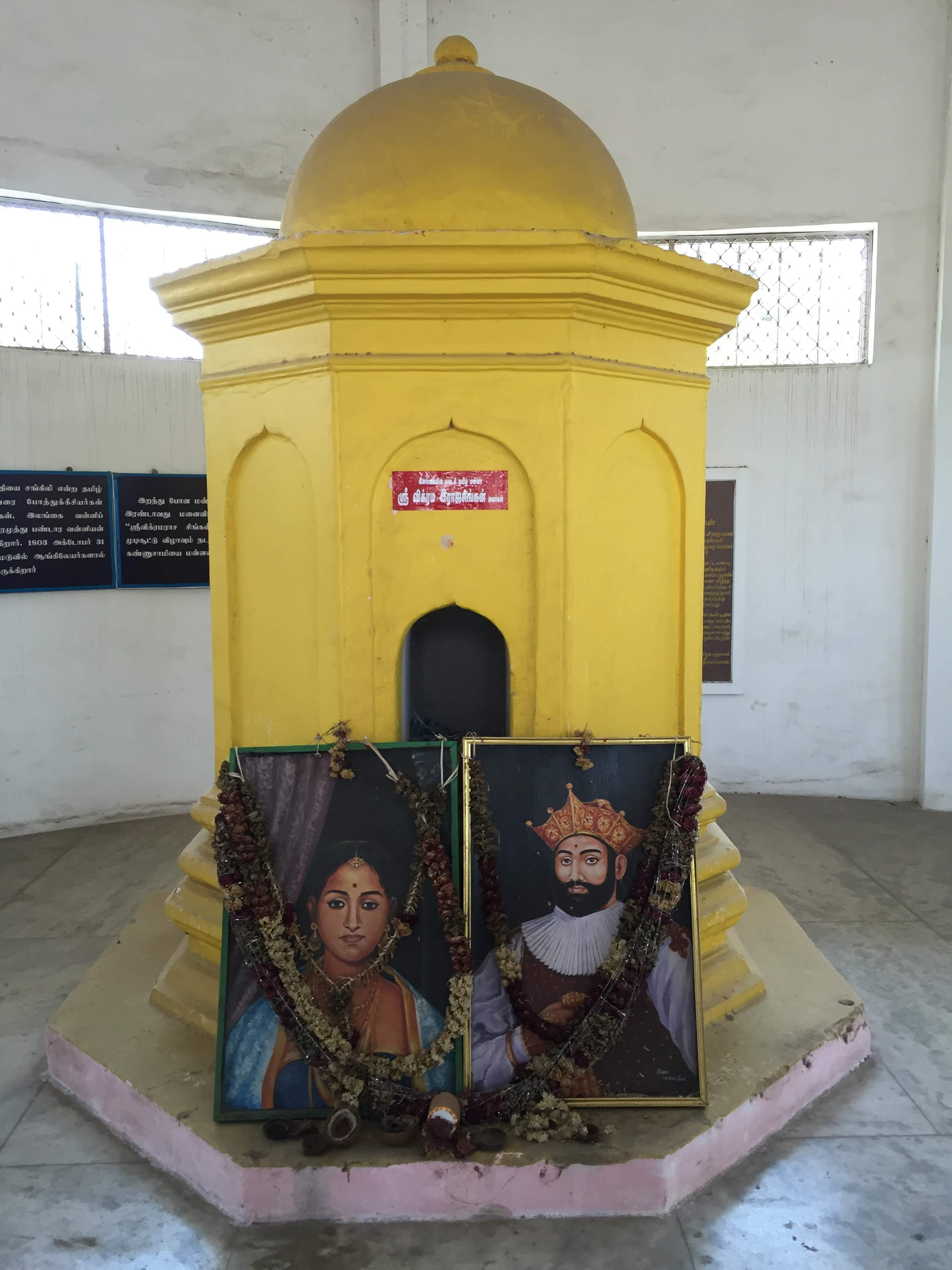
Grave of Vikrama Raja Sinha and Consort, Vellore

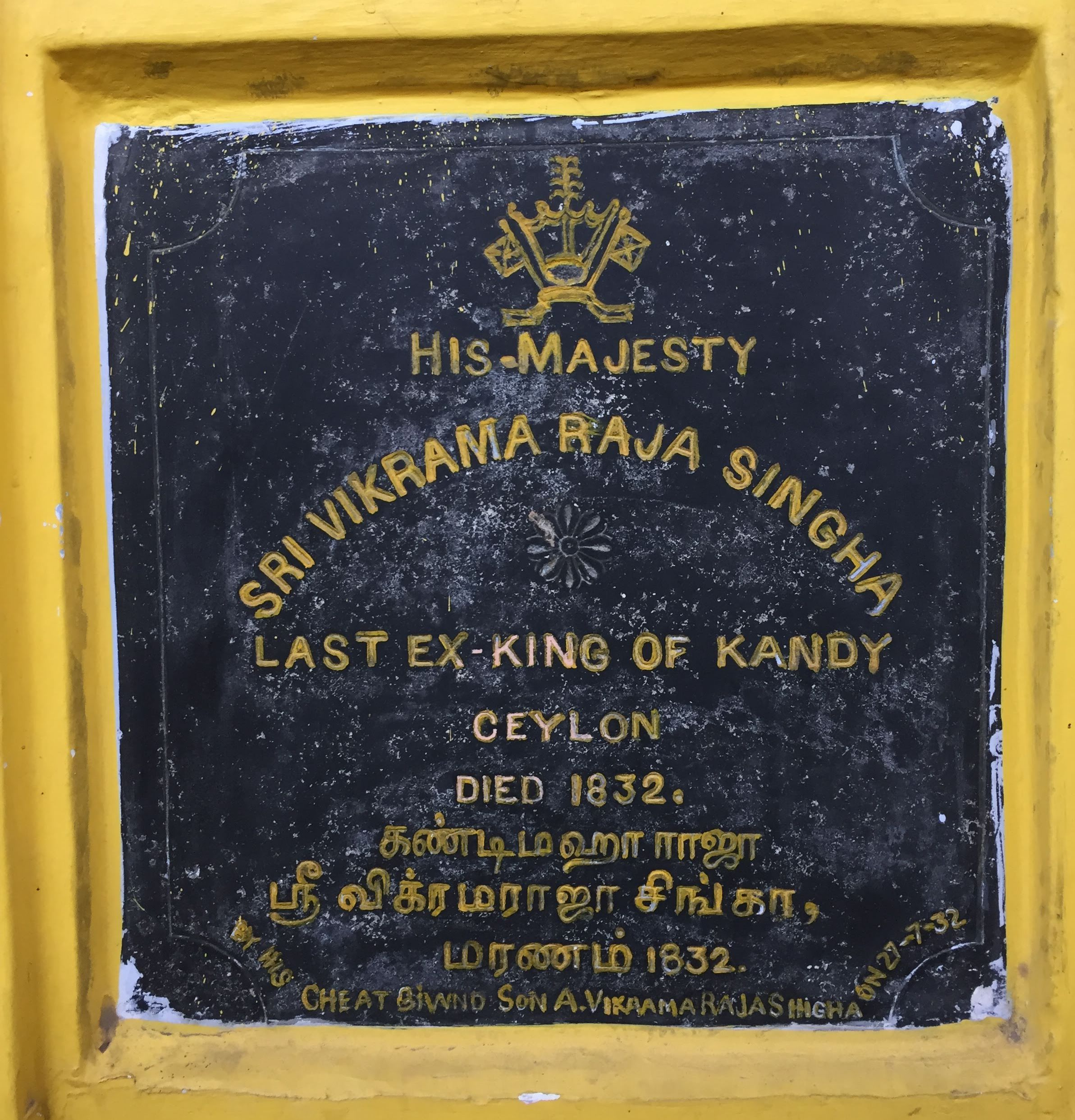
Grave Headstone of Vikrama Raja Sinha, Vellore

== Descendants ==
British records says that he had a son. Social reformer Pattukkottai Alagiri was a descendant of the Royal Family of Kandy.

== Legacy ==
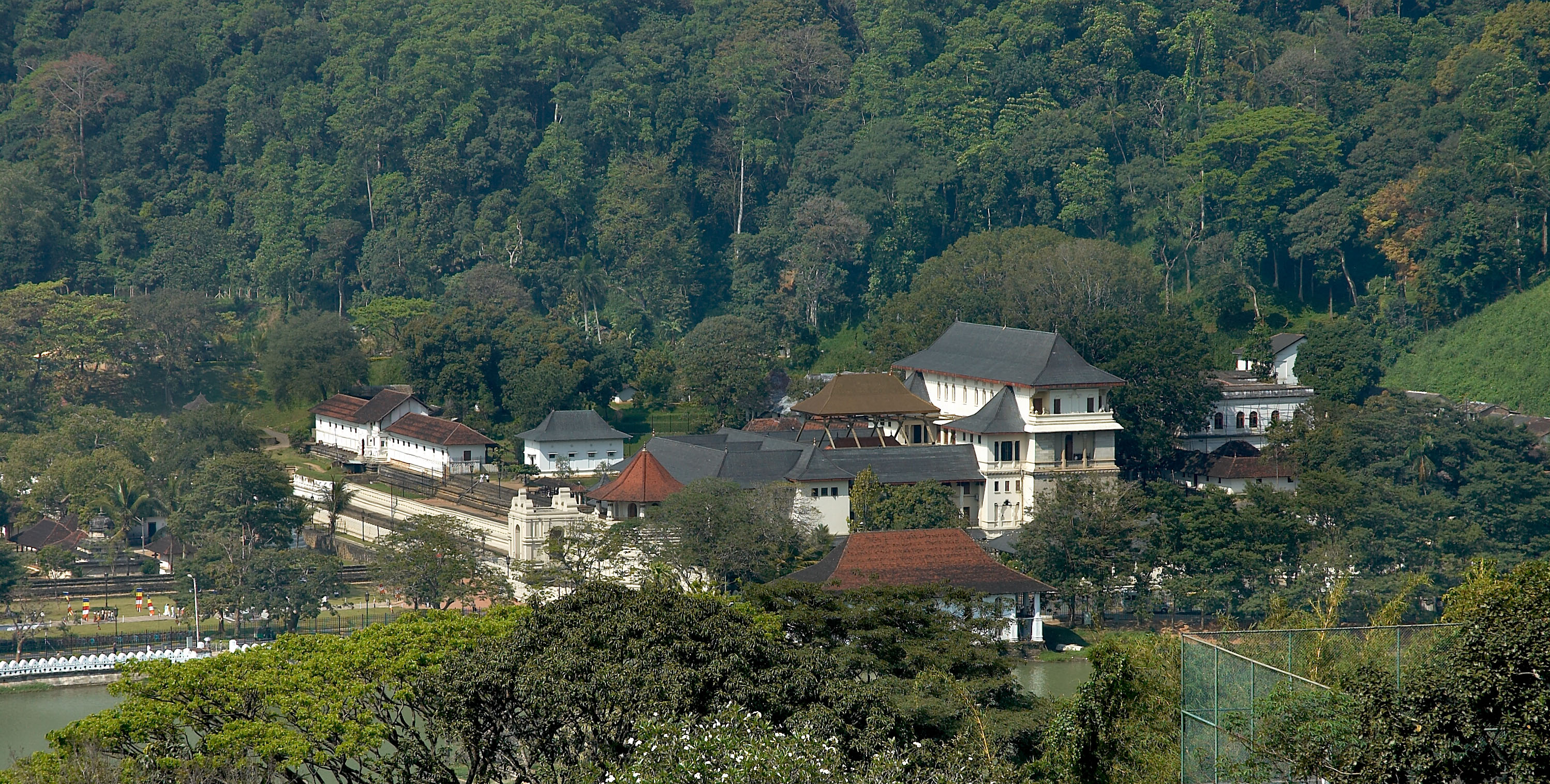
Palace of King Sri Vikrama Rajasinha.

Flag of the Kingdom of Kandy.

The current Flag of Sri Lanka incorporates Sri Vikrama Rajasinha's Royal Standard. In September 1945 it was proposed in an address to the State Council that the flag be adopted as Sri Lanka's national flag:

"This House is of opinion that the Royal Standard of King Sri Vikrama Rajasinha depicting a yellow lion passant holding a sword in its right paw on a red background, which was removed to England after the Convention of 1815, should once again be adopted as the official flag of Free Lanka."

Kandy Lake, an artificial lake overlooking the palace in Kandy, was commissioned by Sri Vikrama Rajasinha.

The Paththirippuwa or Octagon of the Sri Dalada Maligawa, is widely regarded as the epitome or the most admired symbol and representation of Kandyan Sinhalese Architecture. It was built in 1802 A.D. by Devendra Mulachari, Master Craftsman and Royal Architect, on the instructions of King Sri Vikrama Rajasinha.

During Sri Vikrama Rajasinha's time as a royal prisoner in Vellore Fort he received a privy purse, which his descendants continued to receive from the Government of Ceylon until 1965. Muthu Mandapam is a memorial built around the tombstone of Sri Vikrama Rajasinha, the last south Indian origin ruler of Kandy. Situated on the bank Palar River, it is just one km north of Vellore town.

During Sri Vikrama Rajasinha's reign, Tamil was used as one of the court languages in Kandy – a historical fact with implications for the present-day politics of Sri Lanka.

- This ivory piece features an engraved portrait of King Sri Vikrama Raja Sinha, showcasing intricate craftsmanship.
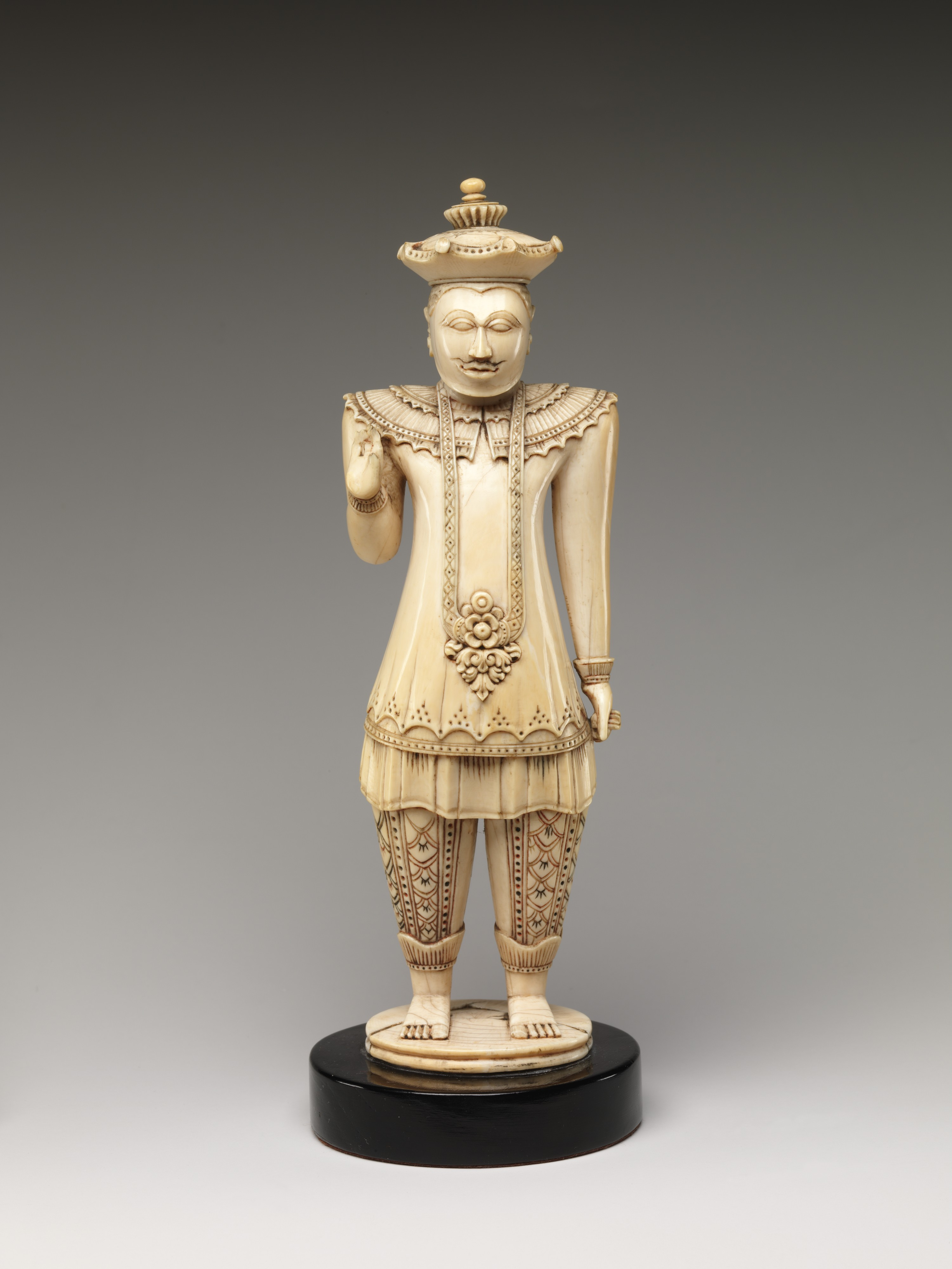
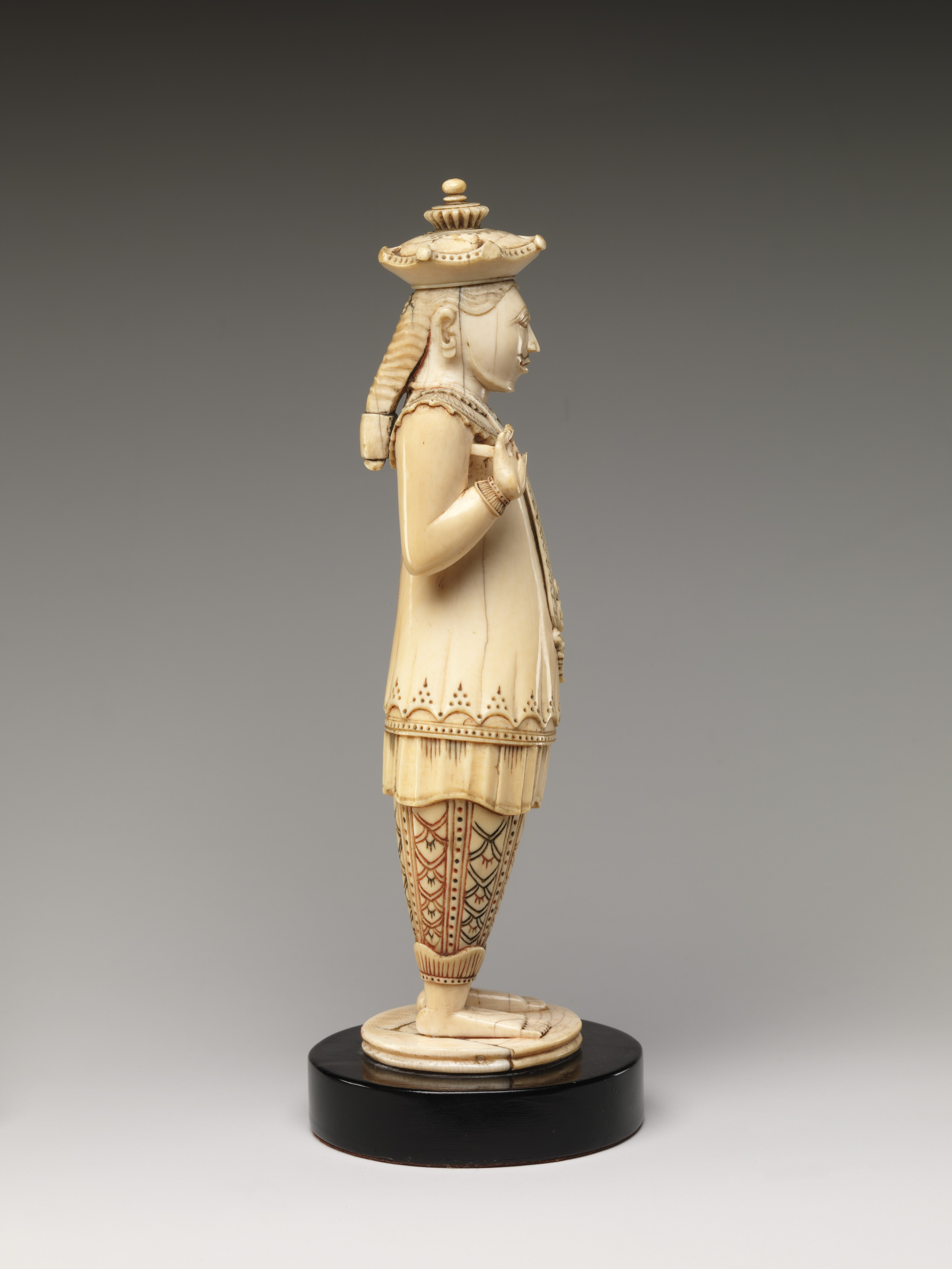
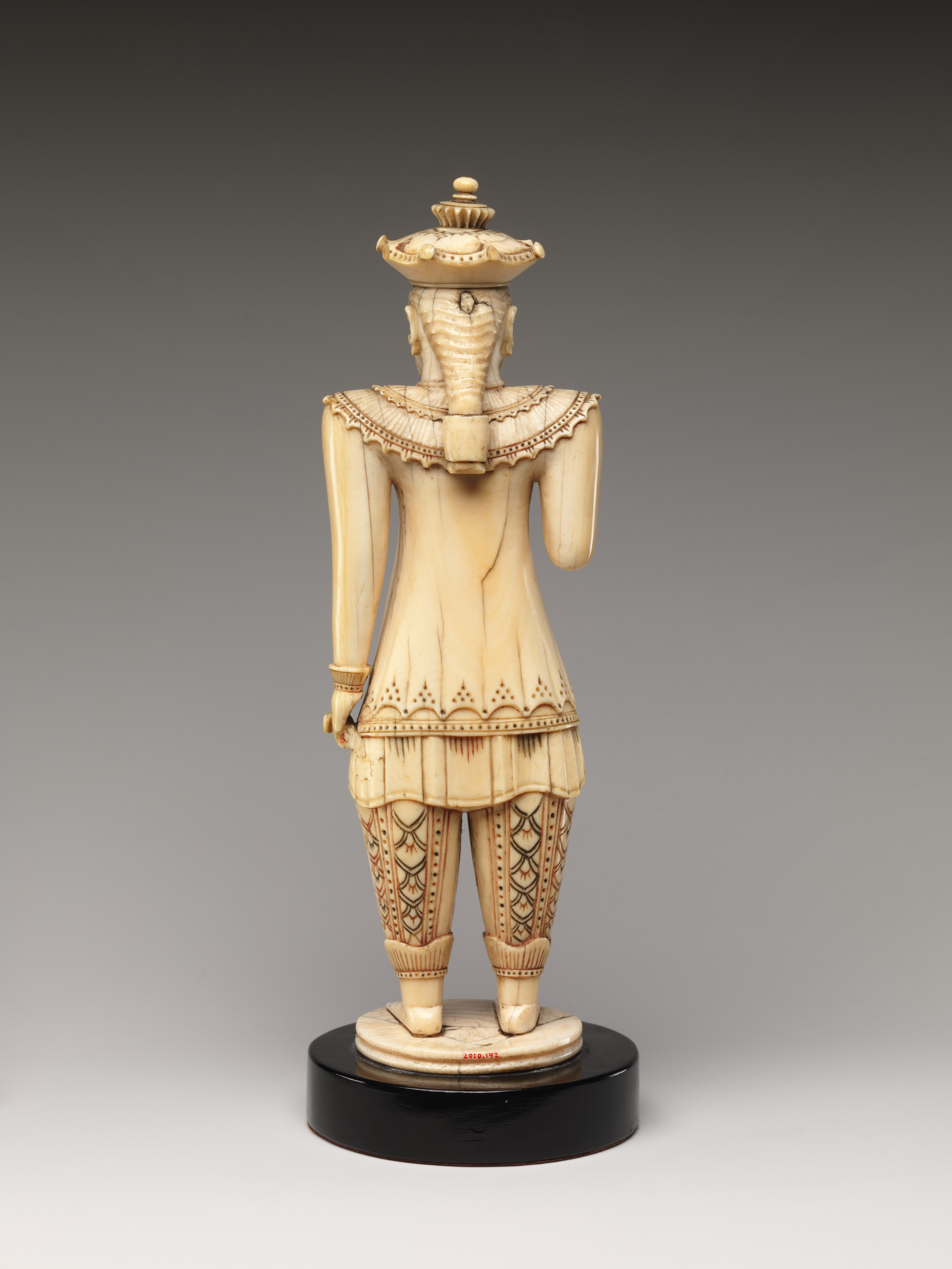
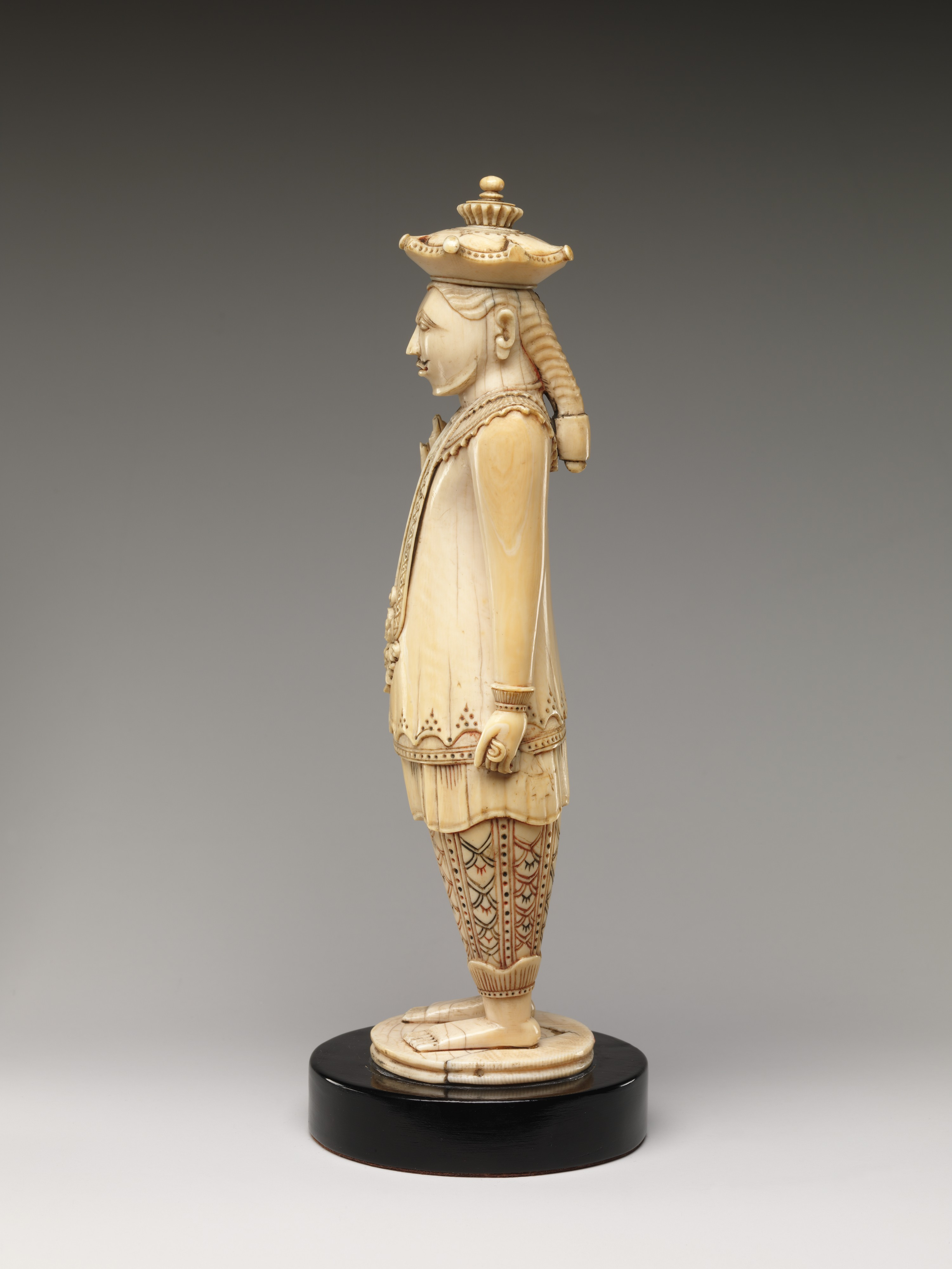

== In popular culture ==
- Portrayed by Ranjith Perera in the 1984 film Madduma Bandara.
- Portrayed by Jackson Anthony in the 2014 film Ahelepola Kumarihami.
- Portrayed by Pubudu Chathuranga in the 2018 film Girivassipura.
- Portrayed by Akhila Dhanuddara in the 2023 biographical film Sri Wickrama.

== See also ==
- List of Sri Lankan monarchs
- Madurai Nayak Dynasty
- Kandyan Wars

Sri Vikrama Rajasinha House of Nayaka Born: ? 1780 Died: January 30 1832
Regnal titles
Preceded by Sri Rajadhi Rajasinha	King of Kandy; 1798 – 10 February 1815	Succeeded by End of Sinhalese monarchy George III of the United Kingdom, As king of British Ceylon
