= Menik Wehera =

Ancient Buddhist monastery complex, Polonnaruwa, Sri Lanka

Religion
- Affiliation: Theravada Buddhism
- Ecclesiastical or organizational status: Archaeological site, Ruin

Location
- Location: Alahana Parivena, Polonnaruwa, Sri Lanka
- Interactive map of Menik Wehera
- Coordinates: 7°56′16.7″N 81°00′19.1″E

Menik Wehera (මැණික් වෙහෙර, lit. 'Gem Shrine' or 'Jewel Monastery') is an ancient Buddhist monastery complex located in the historic city of Polonnaruwa, Sri Lanka. It is situated within the boundaries of the Alahana Parivena, a large medieval monastic university, but archaeological evidence suggests it predates the main foundations of that complex. Dating to the late Anuradhapura or early Polonnaruwa period (c. 8th–10th century CE), it is distinguished by its unique layout, with the main stupa positioned on a high, walled terrace.

== Etymology ==
The name Menik Wehera is derived from the Sinhala words Menik (මැණික්), meaning 'gem' or 'jewel', and Wehera (වෙහෙර), a term for a 'monastery' or 'shrine'. While the exact reason for the name is not recorded, it likely reflects the precious or revered status of the monastery.

== History and Features ==
Menik Wehera is considered one of the older monastic structures in Polonnaruwa. Architectural style and archaeological finds, including pottery, indicate that the complex was established before the 12th-century building boom under King Parakramabahu I. Its design shows a transition between the architectural conventions of the Anuradhapura and Polonnaruwa periods.

The monastery is noted for its distinctive layout. The main religious structures are built on a high, rectangular brick-faced terrace (maluwa), which is surrounded by a perimeter wall (prakara). Gateways are positioned at the four cardinal directions, providing access to the sacred platform.

=== Stupa ===
On the terrace stands a small, well-preserved brick stupa. During conservation efforts led by the Central Cultural Fund, the stupa's relic chamber was excavated. Archaeologists discovered a stone relic casket (karanduwa) along with numerous small terracotta votive stupas, which were likely left as offerings by pilgrims.

=== Other Structures ===
In addition to the main stupa, the foundations of other buildings are visible on the terrace. These include an image house (patimaghara) and what may have been a Bodhighara (a shrine enclosing a sacred Bodhi tree).

Although the site is ancient, it remained significant during the peak of the Polonnaruwa Kingdom. A pillar inscription by King Nissanka Malla (1187–1196) was found near the site, indicating its continued importance and royal patronage even in the late 12th century.

== See also ==
- Alahana Parivena
- Polonnaruwa
- Rankoth Vehera
- Kiri Vehera
- Lankathilaka Viharaya
- Ancient stupas of Sri Lanka
