= Lankapura Dandanatha =

General of Parakramabahu the great

- Military career
- Allegiance: Kingdom of Polonnaruwa
- Branch: Sinhala Army
- Conflicts: Pandyan Civil War (1169-1177)

Lankapura Dandanatha, more commonly referred to as simply Lankapura, was a Senapati of the Sinhala Army during the reign of King Parakramabahu I. He led an expeditionary force to South India in support of the Pandyan king Parakrama Pandyan I, made Vira Pandyan to get the throne. Parakrama Pandyan I was killed during the Siege of Madurai in the early stage of the war Lankapura and his forces were able to summon a Pandyan prince by the name of Vira Pandyan III who is the son of Parakrama Pandyan I and Lankapura succeeded in restoring the Pandyan prince to the throne, and ordered the use of Sri Lankan currency in areas under Pandyan prince control. After his victories, he was defeated and beheaded by Cholas.

== Name ==
Lankapura was the son of Lankadhinatha Kitti, a regional ruler. His real name is unclear. Dandanatha may have been his real name, and Lankapura a title. However, some sources refer to him as Dandanatha of Lankapura, indicating that Lankapura was in fact a place name, likely referring to the region of Lanka, wheres pura means place. It is also possible that Lankapura was the actual given name, and Dandanatha was a title. However, most sources, both modern and ancient, refer to him commonly as Lankapura.

== Invasion ==
The Pandyan king Parakrama Pandya sought assistance from cousin Parakramabahu I in 1167 to face an internal strife in his country. Parakramabahu prepared an army, and appointed Senapati (General) Lankapura as its commander. However, by the time Lankapura and his army reached the port of Mahatittha (Mannar) in the north west of Sri Lanka, Parakrama Pandya had been killed by his rival Kulasekhara Pandya.

Despite this setback, Lankapura proceeded with an invasion to dethrone Kulasekhara Pandya. This was possibly launched in 1173. After sailing for a "day and night", his army landed in South India. He attacked Rameswaram and captured it after several battles. Lankapura fought with and defeated the Pandyan army in several towns and villages after this, and established a fortress at Kundukaal and named it Parakramapura after the king of Sri Lanka.

A counterattack by Kulasekhara Pandya on this fortress was repelled back, and Vira Pandya, Parakrama Pandya's son later joined up with Lankapura. The army of Lankapura continued to march forward and came to a stronghold named Semponmari. Parakramabahu sent another General named Jagath Vijaya to assist Lankapura in another battle against Kulasekhara Pandya who had returned with reinforcements, and they defeated him again. The throne was handed over to Vira Pandya. Lankapura went on to capture several more towns and villages including the city of Madura.

== End of invasion ==
Kulasekhara Pandya subsequently obtained assistance from the Cholas and returned to fight Lankapura's army again. However, Lankapura defeated them again. He ordered the Sri Lankan currency, Kahapana, to be used in the areas under his control. The Indian prisoners of war captured by Lankapura's army were sent to Sri Lanka to repair the Ruwanweli Seya and other buildings damaged by earlier Chola invasions.

Then the Cholas decided to fight Lankapura's army again, but news son arrived from Pilai Pallavarayar that the pradhunis, including Jayadratha and Lankapura dandanayakas, and the entire army from Ceylon, had been defeated.

Chola king Rajadhiraja II then responded by sending his commander Thiruchitrambalamudaiyan Perumanambi along with a strong army with specific instructions to kill Lankapura and Jagad Vijaya of the Polonnaruwa Army and hang their heads from the gates of the palace of Madurai and conquer the Pandyan Kingdom.

Pallavarayar, also known as Tirucirrambalamudaiyan Perumanambi, who was entrusted with these tasks, entertained Kulasekhara suitably during his stay in the Cola country, and having with his army, resources and zeal, brought about the reconquest of the Pandiyan kingdom, he carried out his master’s orders to the letter by nailing the heads of Lankapuri-dandanayaka and others(other Soldiers) to the gates of Madura.

Ancient Sri Lankan sources say that Lankapura returned to Sri Lanka after his victory, and was welcomed by Parakramabahu I as a great war hero and was well rewarded. But there can be no doubt, that in the report of Parakkamabahu I's campaigns in Southern India, Dhammakitti suppresses the fact of the failure which overtook the expedition after its first success. The fact itself however is confirmed by South Indian inscriptions. The narrative in the Culavamsa ends abruptly. But we learn from South Indian inscriptions that Parakkamabahu's general was finally defeated and his head with those of his officers was nailed to the gates of Madhura. The Ceylon account is certainly one sided, and describes the war in true epic fashion. The victory is all in favour of the Ceylonese generals, and yet we find ultimately Vira Pandya does not find himself settled upon his throne firmly, ruling over the country subjugated to his authority.

The Chola inscriptions (such as the Arapakkam inscription) state that he was defeated and the heads of Lankapura, Jagath Vijaya and other soldiers were nailed to the gates of Madurai. After Lankapura's death, the forces of the Sri Lankan king were defeated by Kulasekhara Pandya who ultimately regained the throne. The war thus ended in favour of the Cholas, sometime in the 1170s.

Following rumours that Parakramabahu was preparing for another invasion, Rajadhiraja II sent a brigade commanded by Annan Pallavarayan to launch a pre-emptive strike. Annan Pallavarayan invaded Polonnaruwa and destroyed Parakramabahu's preparations for the invasion. The Cholas also provided support to Sinhalese Prince Sri Vallabha, nephew of Parakramabahu and a rival claimant to the Polonnaruwa throne. Sri Vallabha decided to stay in the Chola camp, assisting the Cholas.

The expedition that was sent with Srivallabha at its head captured and destroyed several places in Ceylon, including Pulaiccēri and Mātōţţam, where Parākramabāhu was gathering his forces; it seized many elephants and set fire to a considerable area extending over twenty kādams from east to west and seventy kādams from north to south, killing some of the Singalese chieftains and soldiers of the locality and taking others(soldiers) captive as prisoners of war. The booty captured in the course of the expedition was then duly presented to the Cōla king by Annan Pallavarāyan, who thus successfully counteracted all the machinations of the Ceylonese ruler.
