= Statue of Parakramabahu I =

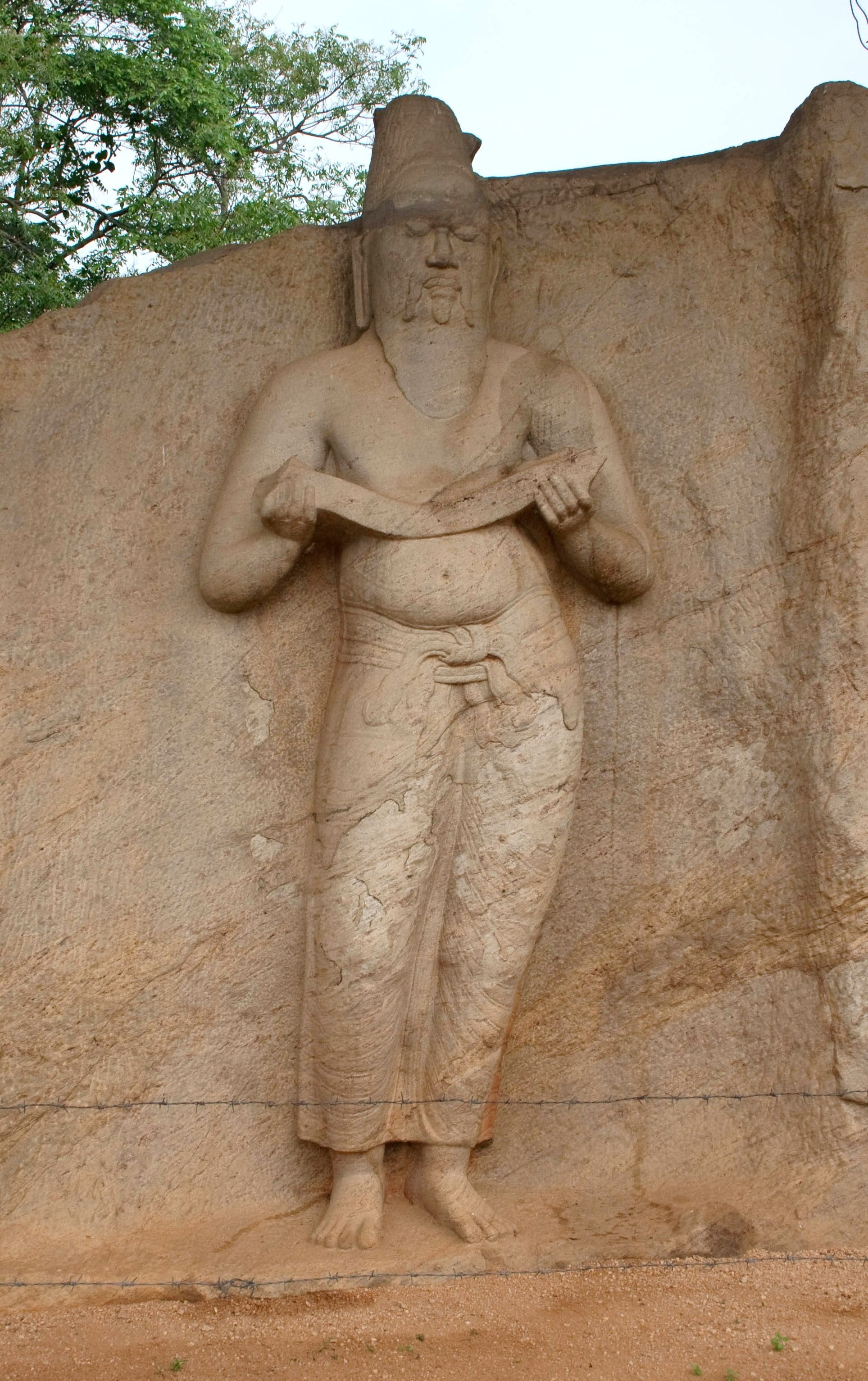
- Year: 12th century
- Type: Stone sculpture
- Dimensions: 3.40 m (11 ft 2 in)
- Location: Polonnaruwa, Sri Lanka; 7°55′35″N 80°59′41″E

Statue of Parakramabahu I, located near the Pothgul Vehera in Polonnaruwa is a stone sculpture dating back to the Polonnaruwa period of ancient Sri Lanka. Its identity is uncertain, although the widely accepted theory is that it is a statue of Parakramabahu I. However, it has also been suggested as the statue of a sage. Carved on a large boulder, the statue depicts a majestic figure with a grave expression, holding a book or yoke in his hands.

== Location ==
The statue, which is located to the north of the city of Polonnaruwa, is situated near the eastern bank of the Parakrama Samudraa reservoir. This reservoir was actually built by Parakramabahu I himself. You can find the statue approximately 100 metres (330 ft) north of the ancient Potgul Vehera monastery.

== Characteristics ==
The statue was built presumably in the 12th century, during the reign of Parakramabahu I. The statue of Parakramabahu I is one of the best stone sculptures belonging to the Polonnaruwa period. The 11-foot-2-inch-high (3.40 m) statue is carved in high relief on a large boulder, with full use being made of its height. Its upper body is bare except for a single thread worn over the left shoulder. A long object is held in the hands. The statue's face carries a grave expression, with half-closed eyes, a high forehead, a long beard and a moustache. The shoulders of the statue are rounded, suggesting "extraordinary strength". The right leg is relaxed with the right knee bent forward slightly. The left leg carries the weight of the body, while the hip is also slightly inclined to the left. According to archaeologist Senarath Paranavitana, this statue is "the very embodiment of strength, majesty and dignity".

== Identity ==
The statue has not been positively identified, but the popular and widely accepted belief is that the statue is of King Parakramabahu I, who ruled the country 1153 to 1186. Historian Mendis Rohanadeera has suggested that the statue shows a man belonging to the Lambakanna clan, because a hare—a symbol of this clan—is depicted above the left shoulder of the statue. This supports the theory that it is a statue of Parakramabahu I, who was of the Lambakanna clan. However, another theory is that it is the statue of a sage; either Agastya or Pulasthi. The object held in the hands of the statue may be an ola (cured palm leaves) book. This, and the fact that it is located close to the Potgul Vehera, which was a library in ancient times, supports this theory. However, another belief is that the object is a "yoke of kingship". There is also a belief that this statue represents King Nissankamalla.
