= Pandyan Civil War (1169–1177) =

Civil war in Southern India

- Part of Pandyan–Sinhalese wars
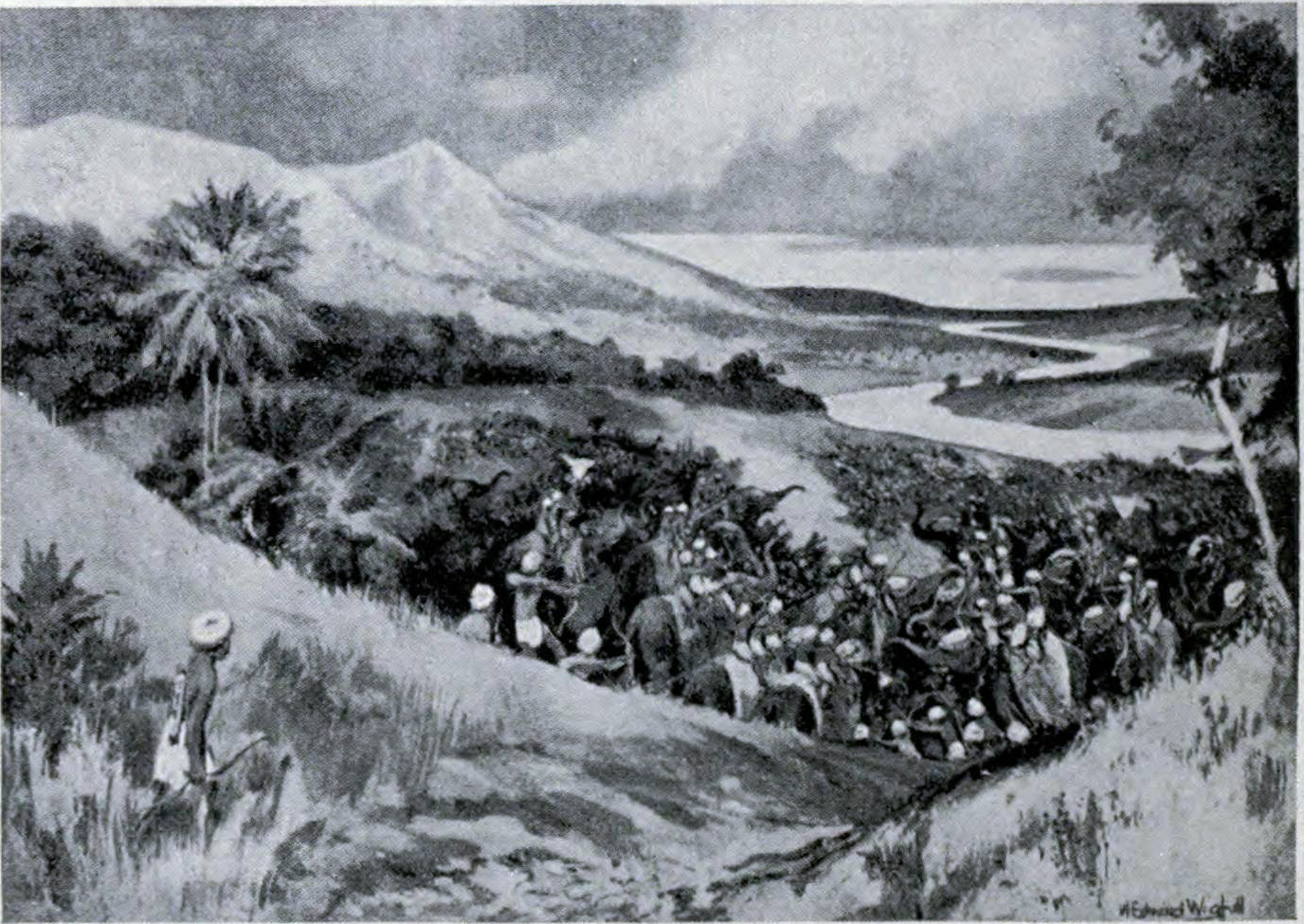
- Sinhalese troops ride into Southern India
Date	1169–1177
Location	Southern India and Sri Lanka
Result	Pandyan civil conflict ends. Rival kingdoms abandon military intervention; Sinhalese-Vira Pandya alliance lost the war against Cholas
Territorial changes	Polonnaruwa kingdom and Vira Pandya III kingdom Alliance occupy Rameshwaram until 1182; Chola backed-faction controls the majority of Pandya Nadu.; Pandya Nadu re-established

Belligerents
Chola dynasty Pandya dynasty	(Anuradhapura kingdom) Kingdom of Polonnaruwa Pandya dynasty

Commanders and leaders
Kings: Rajaraja II (1166–1168); Rajadhiraja II (1174–1177); Kulothunga Chola III (1179–1182); Kulasekara Pandyan (1166-1168); Jatavarman Vira Pandyan (1174–1177); Vikrama Pandiyan (1179–1182); Commanders: Peruman Nambi Pallavarayan (supreme) (1166–1168); Anna Pallavarayan (supreme) (1174–1182); Narasinga Varmarayan (1166–1168); Kandan Suryan Rajaraja Sambuvarayan (1174–1182); Kandadeva Mazhavan; Mazhava Chakkaravrti	Kings: (Anuradhapura kingdom) Parakramabahu I; Parakrama I † (1166–1168); Kulasekara Pandyan (1174–1177); Jatavarman Vira Pandyan (1179–1182); Commanders: (Anuradhapura kingdom) Lankapura Dandanatha (supreme) †; (Anuradhapura kingdom) Jagath Vijaya †; (Anuradhapura kingdom) Lankapura Deva †; (Anuradhapura kingdom) Lankagiri Sora †; (Anuradhapura kingdom) Kesadathu Kitti †; (Anuradhapura kingdom) Kesadathu Loka †; (Anuradhapura kingdom) Gokanna †; Kandadeva Mazhavan; Mazhava Chakkaravarti

Units involved
Chola Army; Chola Navy; Pandyan auxiliaries of Kongu	(Anuradhapura kingdom) Polonnaruwa Army (Anuradhapura kingdom) Polonnaruwa Navy; Pandyan auxiliaries

Casualties and losses
Unknown number of casualties	Sinhala commanders Lankapura Dandanatha, Jagath Vijaya and their officers and soldiers were killed King Parakrama Pandyan I with many number of his soldiers and many number of Sinhalese Soldiers were killed.
- Some Tamils captured from the war were brought to Sri Lanka to renovate the Ruwanwelisaya; Ramanathaswamy temple
- The Cholas killed a lot of Sinhalese and took others captive during and before the counter invasion in Sri Lanka.

The Pandyan Civil War from 1169 to 1177 was precipitated by rival claims of succession to the Pandyan throne. The Civil War began between Parakrama Pandyan and his nephew Kulasekhara Pandyan and lasted for the next 15 years between successive Pandyan kings. The war gradually spread to the rest of Southern India when the Chola King Rajadhiraja II and the Sinhalese King Parakramabahu I of Polonnaruwa entered the fray and took opposing sides in the conflict, eager to increase their influence in the Pandyan kingdom.

In about 1169, Kulasekhara besieged Madurai, forcing the Pandyan king Parakrama I to appeal to the Sinhalese King Parakramabahu I for assistance. But before Parakramabahu I's army could reach Madurai, Parakrama I had been executed, and Kulasekhara Pandyan had ascended the throne. However, Parakrama's son, Vira Pandyan III, sided with the Polonnaruwa forces led by General Lankapura Dandanatha. The Polonnaruwa Army invaded the Pandyan kingdom and, Kulasekhara Pandyan was forced into exile.

== Events ==
=== Prior to the war ===
Images of various gateway towers in the temple in 1169, Kulasekhara Pandyan, a rival claimant of the Pandyan throne, besieged the Pandyan capital at Madurai. Pandyan king, Parakrama Pandyan I, had to call for military support from the King of Polonnaruwa, Parakramabahu I. By the time the Polonnaruwa Army was assembled for an invasion, it was too late. Parakrama Pandyan's position was overrun, and Kulasekhara ascended the throne as Kulasekhara Pandya I. Parakramabahu I instructed his general Lankapura Dandanatha to invade Pandya and besiege Madurai, thus overthrowing Kulasekhara and place Vira Pandya III on the throne.

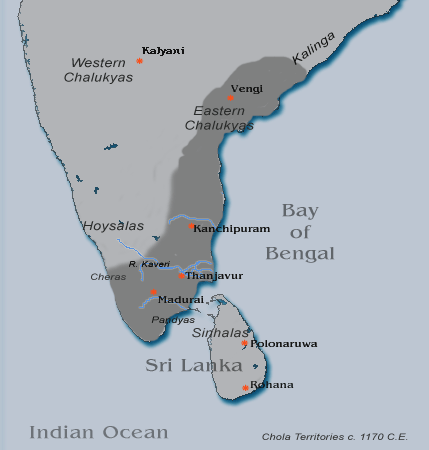
Chola Territory During the war.

=== Sinhalese offensive ===
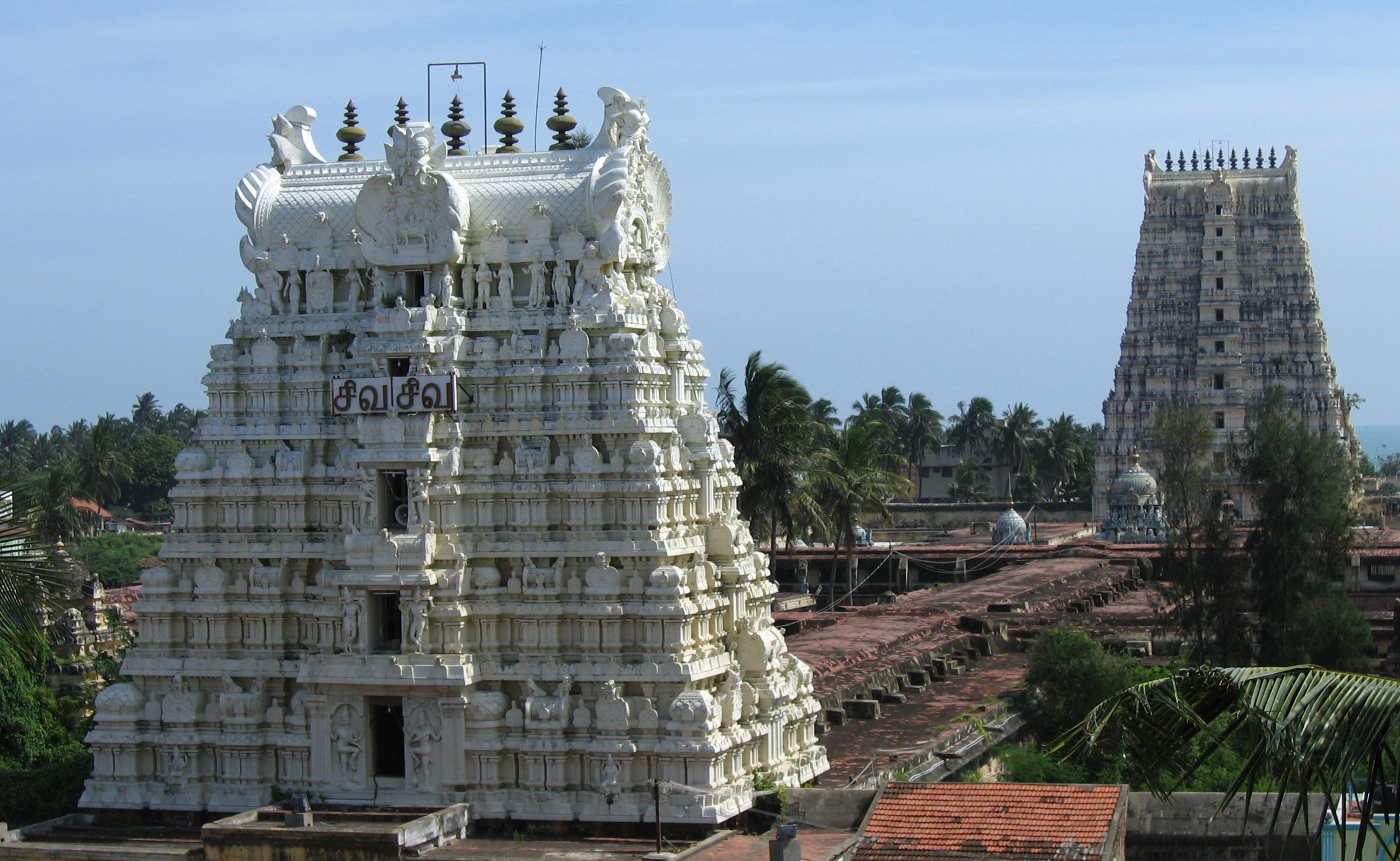
The Ramanathaswamy Temple in Rameswaram was sacked by the Polonnaruwa Army.

The offensive began in 1171 or 1172; the Sinhalese Army and other units of Polonnaruwa led by Lankapura launched the attack on Ramesvaram. After sailing around the Palk Strait for a day, Lankapura landed at Ramesvaram (Ramissara in Old Sinhala) with the Polonnaruwa forces. However, he plundered the Rameshvaram temple's treasury prior to taking position. Afterwards they took up defensive positions in a nearby place called Kundukala, Lankapura named this place Parakramapura (in Sinhala). meaning the Land of Parakrama). Lankapura received a message from Vira Pandya III, the surviving son of Parakrama Pandyan; after being aware that he was alive, Lankapura allied with him. Prisoners of Lankapura were sent to repair the Ruwanwelisaya, which was damaged by the Cholas a century prior.

Lankapura defeated the chieftains, who were apparently loyal to Kulasekhara, at Madamdura; and later took possession of Patapatha, defeating its chieftains.

Kulasekhara Pandya put up a fierce resistance against the invasion and appealed to the Chola King Rajadhiraja II for military support. Rajadhiraja responded by sending a powerful force led by commander Pallavarayar. The Chola Army met the Polonnaruwa forces in a couple of pitched battles at Kilenilaya (identified with the modern-day Kilnilai) and Pon-Amaravathi. In addition to the Cholas, Kulasekhara appealed to some Kongu chieftains, who helped him mobilize his forces. The army led by Lankapura advanced to Madurai, defeating the defenses deployed by the Chola army. Kulasekhara fled Madurai in panic as Vira Pandya was installed on the throne. Then Cholas decided to fight against the Lankapura's army again, then came news from Pilai Pallavarayar that the commanders including Jayadratha (Jagath Vijaya) and Lankapura Dandanatha and the entire army from Sri Lanka had sustained defeat.

=== Chola Offensive ===
Rajadhiraja II then responded by sending his commander Thiruchitrambalamudaiyan Perumanambi along, with a strong army with specific instructions to kill Lankapura and Jagath Vijaya of the Polonnaruwa Army and hang their heads from the gates of the palace of Madurai.

Pallavarayar alias Tirucirrambalamudaiyan Perumanambi, who was entrusted with these tasks, entertained Kulasekhara suitably during his stay in the Chola country and having with his army, resources and zeal, brought about the reconquest of the Pandyan kingdom. He carried out his master's orders to the letter by nailing the heads of Lankapura Dandanatha and others (other Soldiers) to the gates of Madurai in 1174.

The Chola inscriptions that describe this war make it appear that the Chola intervention under Pallava Rayar, the son of Edirisola Sambuvarayan, was effective, and was the deciding factor in the retirement of the Sinhalese. Kulasekhara was able, after the departure of the Sinhala army, to maintain the campaign, and ultimately victory seems to have turned in his favour. The war continued against Vira Pandya even after the retirement of the Sinhalese. Kulasekhara died in the course of the war or soon after. The last great Chola Kulottunga III, as heir-apparent, took up the cause of his son Vikrama Pandya vigorously, and, according to the Chola record at Tirukkollambudur of the fourth year of Kulottunga III (A.D. 1182) "the Sinhalese soldiers had their noses cut off and rushed into the sea. Vira Pandya himself was compelled to retreat. The town of Madurai was captured and made over to Vikrama Pandya." The war thus ended in favour of the Cholas, sometime in the 1170s.

Following rumours that Parakramabahu was preparing for another invasion, Rajadhiraja II sent a brigade commanded by Annan Pallavarayan to launch a pre-emptive strike. Annan Pallavarayan invaded Polonnaruwa and destroyed Parakramabahu's preparations for the invasion. The Cholas also provided support to Sinhalese Prince Sri Vallabha, nephew of Parakramabahu and a rival claimant to the Polonnaruwa throne. Sri Vallabha decided to stay in the Chola camp, assisting the Cholas.

The expedition that was sent with Srivallabha at its head captured and destroyed several places in Sri Lanka, including Pulaiccēri and Mahathiththa, where Parakramabahu was gathering his forces; it seized many elephants and set fire to a considerable area extending over twenty kādams from east to west and seventy kādams from north to south, killing some of the Sinhalese chieftains of the locality and taking others(soldiers) captive as prisoners of war. The booty captured in the course of the expedition was then duly presented to the Chola king by Annan Pallavarayan, who thus successfully counteracted all the machinations of the Sinhalese ruler.

According to K. A. Nilakanta Sastri, Parakramabahu made a volte-face by sending costly gifts such as jewels and gold to Kulasekhara convincing him to invade the Chola Kingdom. Kulasekhara invaded the Cholas but was defeated and driven out. Chola forces then successfully invaded the Pandya kingdom and reinstalled Prince Vira Pandya on the throne. However, S. K. Aiyangar notes that Kulasekhara died in the course of the war, and his son Vickrama Pandya kept rebelling against the occupying forces.

=== Aftermath ===
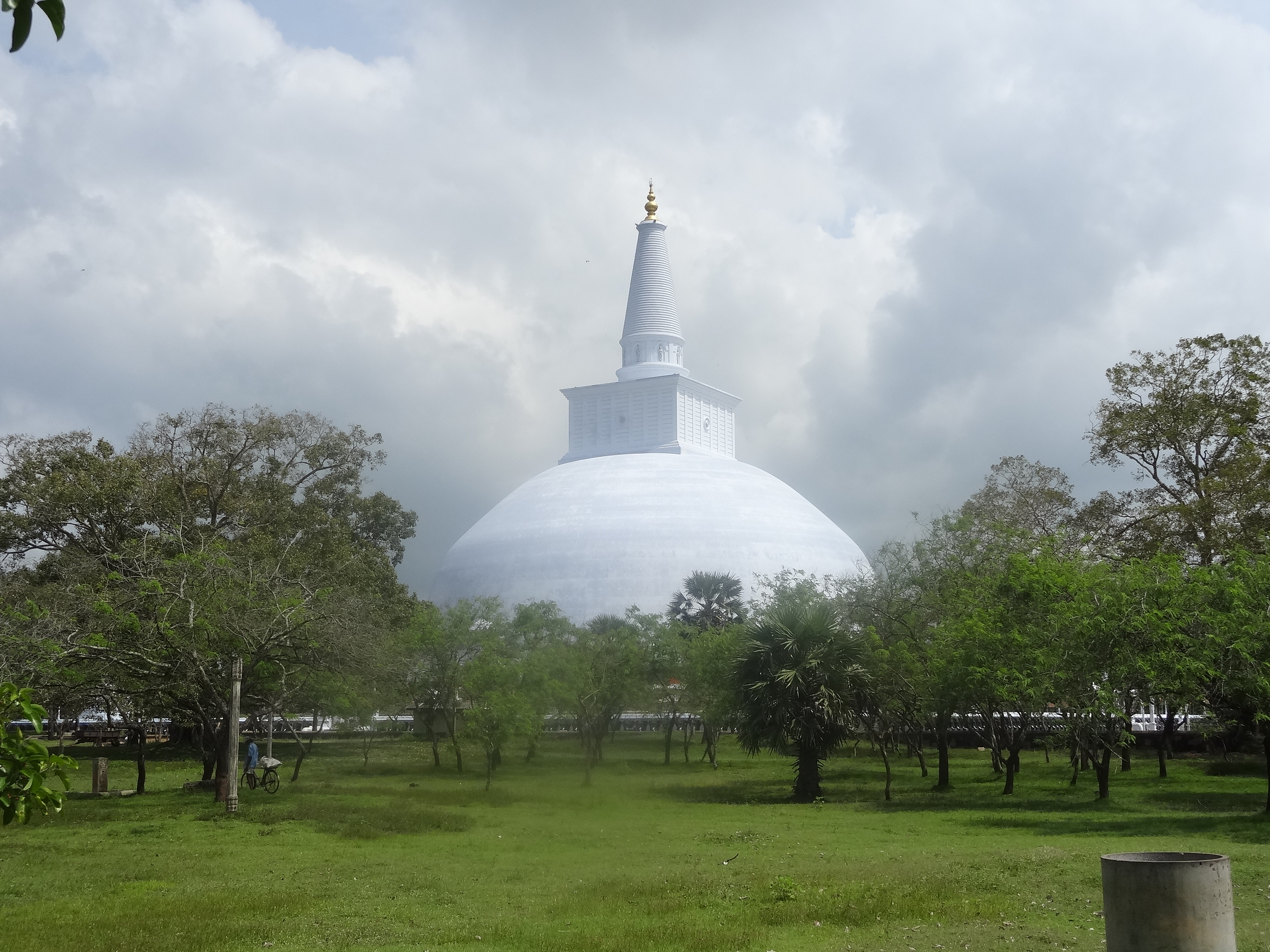
Prisoners of the War were sent to Ruwanwelisaya to repair the stupa previously damaged by Chola Invasions.

Vira Pandya remained a client of the Cholas, however, he decided to grant independence to the Pandya country. His hostilities against the Cholas begun at a time when Kulasekhara's son, Vickrama was rebelling against him. Despite receiving assistance from Parakramabahu, he was defeated and Vickrama ascended the throne. The armies of Parakramabahu and Vira Pandyan controlled Rameswaram until 1182.

== Legacy ==
=== Second conflict ===
The death of Jatavarman Pandyan occurred in 1308, a second conflict stemmed from succession disputes amongst his sons, Jatavarman Sundara Pandyan III, the legitimate and younger son and Jatavarman Veera Pandyan II, the illegitimate older son who the king favoured. Accounts from Muslim historians Wassaf and Amir Khusrau say he was killed by Jatavarman Sundara Pandyan III in 1310.

== See also ==
- Parakrama Pandyan II
- Chola conquest of Anuradhapura
- Anuradhapura invasion of Pandya
- Parakramabahu I § War with Bagan
