= Polonnaruwa =

Town in North Central Province, Sri Lanka

Polonnaruwa පොළොන්නරුව பொலன்னறுவை
- Town
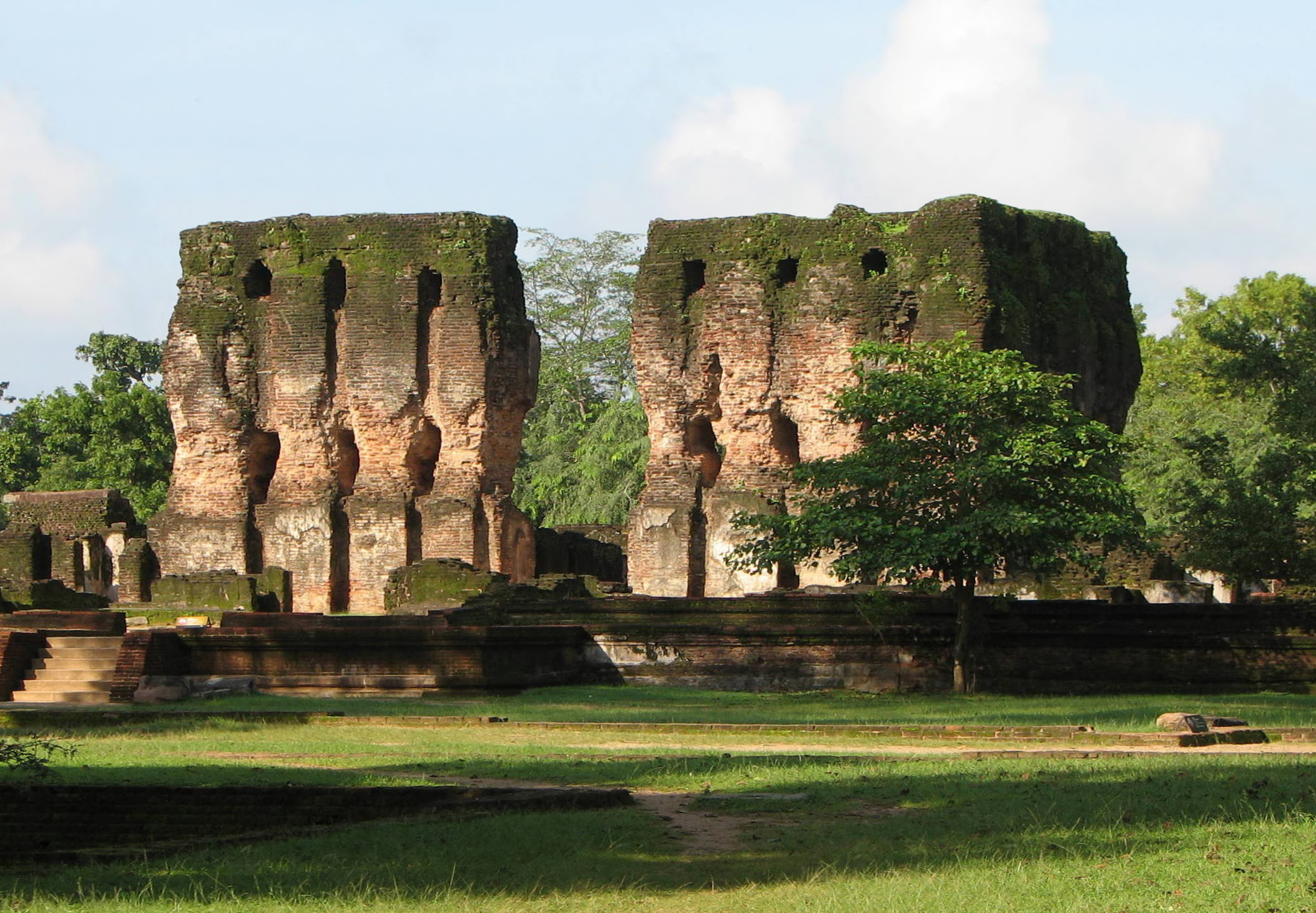
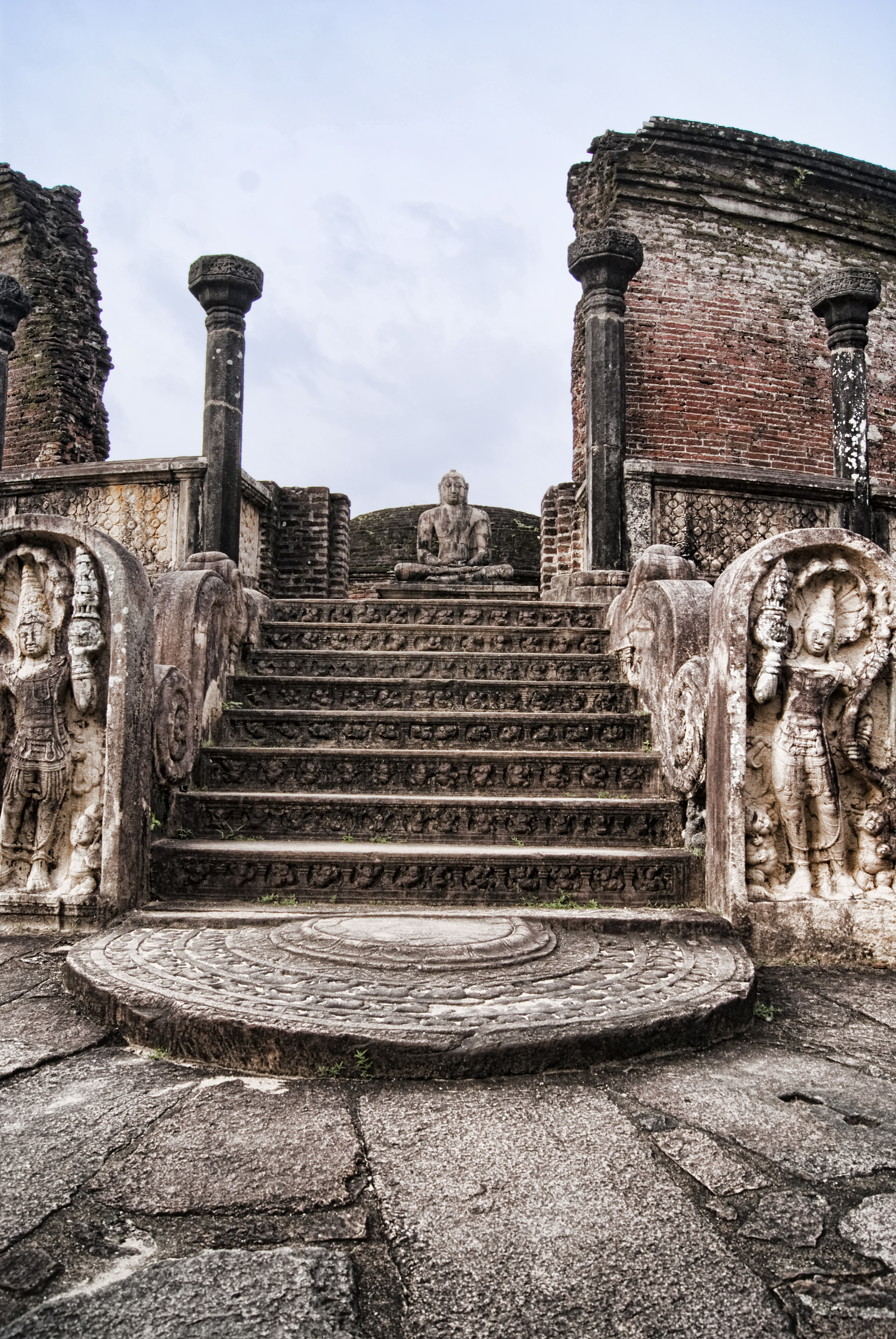
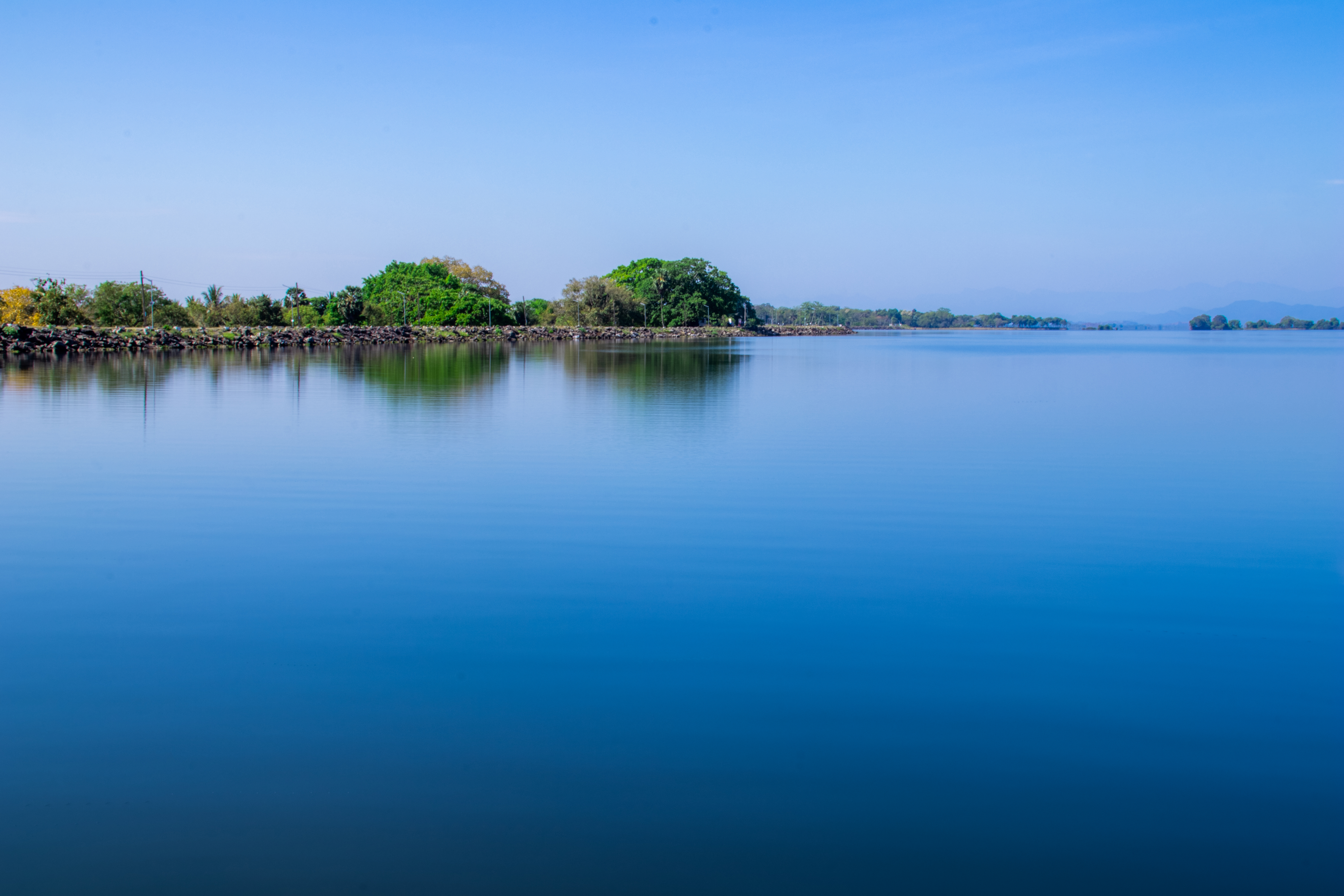
- The Royal Palace of Parakramabahu I Polonnaruwa Vatadage Parakrama Samudra Deepa Uyana Royal Park Polonnaruwa city center

- Location in Sri Lanka
- Coordinates: 7°56′N 81°0′E
- Country: Sri Lanka
- Province: North Central Province
- Polonnaruwa: Before 1070 AD

Population (2024)
  - Total: 447,530
  - Density: 135.9/km^{2} (352/sq mi)
- Time zone: UTC+5:30 (Sri Lanka Standard Time Zone)
- Postal code: 51000
- Area code: 027 (+94 27)
- Website: https://www.polonnaruwa.dist.gov.lk

UNESCO World Heritage Site
- Official name: Ancient City of Polonnaruwa
- Criteria: Cultural: i, iii, vi
- Reference: 201
- Inscription: 1982 (6th Session)

Poḷonnaruwa, (Sinhala: පොළොන්නරුව, romanized: Poḷonnaruva; Tamil: பொலன்னறுவை, romanized: Polaṉṉaṟuvai) also referred as Pulathisipura and Vijayarajapura in ancient times, is the main town of Polonnaruwa District in North Central Province, Sri Lanka. The modern town of Polonnaruwa is also known as New Town, and the other part of Polonnaruwa remains as the royal ancient city of the Kingdom of Polonnaruwa.

The second-oldest of all Sri Lanka's kingdoms, Polonnaruwa was first established as a military post by the Sinhalese kingdom. It was renamed Jananathamangalam by the Chola dynasty after their successful invasion of the country's then capital, Anuradhapura, in the 10th century. The Ancient City of Polonnaruwa has been declared a World Heritage Site.

== Etymology ==
The name Polonnaruwa is of unknown origin. Its Tamil form, Pulainari, is mentioned in Tamil inscriptions of the Chola dynasty found at Polonnaruwa. The name was perhaps a contraction of its ancient name Pulastya nagara or Pulatti nakaram meaning city of the Hindu sage Pulastya.

It was renamed under Chola rule as Jananathapuram or Jananathamangalam. The place was later known as Vijayarajapuram as mentioned in the records of Jayabahu I, which probably was derived from the name of Vijayabahu I.

== History ==
Polonnaruwa was first established as a military post by the Sinhalese kingdom. It was renamed Jananathamangalam by the Chola dynasty after their successful invasion of the country in the 10th century. Raja Raja Chola I built Vanavan Mahadevisvaram, a Shiva temple at Polonnaruwa named after his queen, which presently is known as Siva Devale. The temple among other contained Ganesha and Parvati statues of bronze. During this period, the northern and central regions of Sri Lanka were directly governed as a Chola province under Rajendra Chola I. However, after 1070 AD, Chola rule on the island came to an end, and Polonnaruwa was captured by Vijayabahu I of Polonnaruwa, also known as Vijayabahu the Great.

Starting from Mahanagakula on the south of the Walawe river, Vijayabahu dispatched three armies to attack Polonnaruwa from three fronts. One army was sent along the western shore of the country to the port of Mahathittha to deal with any reinforcements arriving from South India. Afterwards, part of this army moved towards Polonnaruwa and attacked from the northwest. A second army was sent from the east across Magama to attack Polonnaruwa from the east. The third and main force advanced across the country, led by the king. Surrounded by these three armies, Polonnaruwa was besieged for seven months before king Vijayabahu I's forces entered the city. In 1070, Vijayabahu I became the ruler of Polonnaruwa. At that time Sri Lanka was known as Thambapanni.

Trade and agriculture flourished under the patronage of King Parakramabahu the Great, the renowned grandson of Vijayabahu I of Polonnaruwa, who insisted that not a single drop of water falling from the heavens should go to waste, ensuring that every drop contributed to the development of the land. Hence, irrigation systems that are far superior to those of the Anuradhapura period were constructed during Parakramabahu I's reign – systems which to this day supply the water necessary for paddy cultivation during the scorching dry season in the east of the country. The greatest of these systems is the Parakrama Samudra or the Sea of Parakrama which was also used as a large sea-going ship anchorage via the Mahaweli River. The Kingdom of Polonnaruwa was completely self-sufficient during King Parakramabahu I's reign.

With the exception of his immediate successor, Nissankamalla I, the other monarchs of Polonnaruwa were not as strong-willed and were prone to picking fights within their own court. They also went on to form more matrimonial alliances with stronger South Indian kingdoms until these matrimonial links superseded the local royal lineage. This prompted an invasion by the Aryacakravarti dynasty warlord Kalinga Magha in 1214, which resulted in the complete destruction of the metropolises of Anuradhapura and Polonnaruwa by fire.

== Geography and climate ==
Polonnaruwa is situated in the low-country dry zone of Sri Lanka. The region experiences a tropical climate, with warm temperatures throughout the year and seasonal rainfall influenced by the monsoon system. The annual average temperature recorded for Polonnaruwa was 28.6 °C (83.5 °F).

Rainfall in the region is influenced by the northeast monsoon and the inter-monsoon seasons. The second inter-monsoon, which occurs in October and November, and the northeast monsoon, which occurs from December to February, are important rainfall periods. Polonnaruwa District receives an average annual rainfall of approximately 1,584 mm (62.4 in), with December typically recording the highest rainfall. Rainfall amounts vary between locations and years.

The district's dry-zone climate, seasonal rainfall and irrigation infrastructure are closely linked to its agricultural landscape. The Mahaweli River and the region's irrigation reservoirs provide important water resources for cultivation, particularly rice farming.

Climate data for Polonnaruwa
Month	Jan	Feb	Mar	Apr	May	Jun	Jul	Aug	Sep	Oct	Nov	Dec	Year
Mean daily maximum °C (°F)	27.8 (82.0)	29.1 (84.4)	31.7 (89.1)	33.0 (91.4)	33.9 (93.0)	33.9 (93.0)	33.9 (93.0)	33.9 (93.0)	33.9 (93.0)	31.9 (89.4)	29.1 (84.4)	27.9 (82.2)	31.7 (89.0)
Daily mean °C (°F)	24.3 (75.7)	25.0 (77.0)	26.7 (80.1)	28.0 (82.4)	28.9 (84.0)	29.1 (84.4)	28.9 (84.0)	28.7 (83.7)	28.6 (83.5)	27.2 (81.0)	25.4 (77.7)	24.7 (76.5)	27.1 (80.8)
Mean daily minimum °C (°F)	21.5 (70.7)	21.6 (70.9)	22.5 (72.5)	24.2 (75.6)	25.6 (78.1)	26.0 (78.8)	25.7 (78.3)	25.5 (77.9)	25.2 (77.4)	24.1 (75.4)	22.8 (73.0)	22.2 (72.0)	23.9 (75.1)
Average precipitation mm (inches)	114 (4.5)	75 (3.0)	54 (2.1)	92 (3.6)	64 (2.5)	18 (0.7)	25 (1.0)	34 (1.3)	53 (2.1)	182 (7.2)	238 (9.4)	207 (8.1)	1,156 (45.5)
Average rainy days	11	8	7	10	7	3	4	4	6	13	16	15	104
Average relative humidity (%)	82	80	75	75	68	63	62	62	63	73	84	84	73
Mean monthly sunshine hours	5.1	6.2	7.8	9.4	9.9	10.2	10.3	10.1	9.9	8.8	6.6	5.5	99.8
Source: https://en.climate-data.org/asia/sri-lanka/north-central/polonnaruwa-26466/

== Demographics ==
Polonnaruwa has a Sinhalese majority. Muslims form the second largest group. There are also small numbers of Sri Lankan Tamils and Indian Tamils. Others include Burgher and Malay.

=== Ethnicity according to Thamankaduwa DS Division (2012) ===
Ethnicity in Thamankaduwa DS Division
Population	Percent
Sinhalese	82.90%
Muslims	15.82%
Sri Lankan Tamils	1.01%
Indian Tamils	0.10%
Others	0.16%

Source:statistics.gov.lk

== Present day ==
The ancient city of Polonnaruwa has been declared a World Heritage Site by UNESCO, and was also the filming location for the Duran Duran music video Save a Prayer in 1982. Toque macaques have inhabited the ruins since human occupation and have continued to thrive long after the humans departed.

The modern town of Polonnaruwa, the second-largest city in the North Central Province, lies 3 km south of the archaeologial zone. The largest school in the district, Polonnaruwa Royal Central College is situated in the town.

== See also ==
- Polonnaruwa Vatadage
- Hatadage
- Rankoth Vehera
- Nissanka Latha Mandapaya
- Gal Vihara
- Anuradhapura
- Sigiriya
- Mahawamsa
- Place names in Sri Lanka
- Statue of Parakramabahu I
- Polonnaruwa agreement
- Menik Wehera
