= Parakrama Pandyan I =

Kings of Madurai

Parakrama Pandyan I was a Pandyan king of Tamilakkam, ruling from the Pandyan capital in Madurai. He was besieged in the Pandyan Civil War (1169–1177) by his contemporary, rival and throne claimant Kulasekhara Pandyan in 1169, a vassal of the Chola Dynasty. Parakrama Pandyan I sought assistance from the Ceylonese king Parakramabahu I of Polonnaruwa, but was subsequently executed. Kulasekhara Pandyan ascended to the Madurai throne, but was eventually forced to seek refuge in Chola country in 1171. Parakrama Pandyan I's son Vira Pandyan III ascended on the Pandyan throne before he was defeated by Chola forces.

In 1212, a succeeding namesake royal of the dynasty, Parakrama Pandyan II, invaded Ceylon and became monarch at Polonnaruwa for three years with the title Parakrama Pandya of Polonnaruwa.

In December 2023, five copper plates were found in Arulmigu Kutralanathar Swamy Temple, located in Courtallam of Tenkasi district. The rare discovery belongs to the period of Perumal Parakrama Pandyan of the Pandya Kingdom.
