= Parakramabahu I =

King of Polonnaruwa from 1153 to 1186

Parākramabāhu the Great මහා පරාක්‍රමබාහු
- Siri Saṅgabo; Sakala Siṃhaḷa Chakravartthi; Laṅkādvīpādhipathi; Antaścara-śatruvijaya; Arirājaveśyābhujaṅga
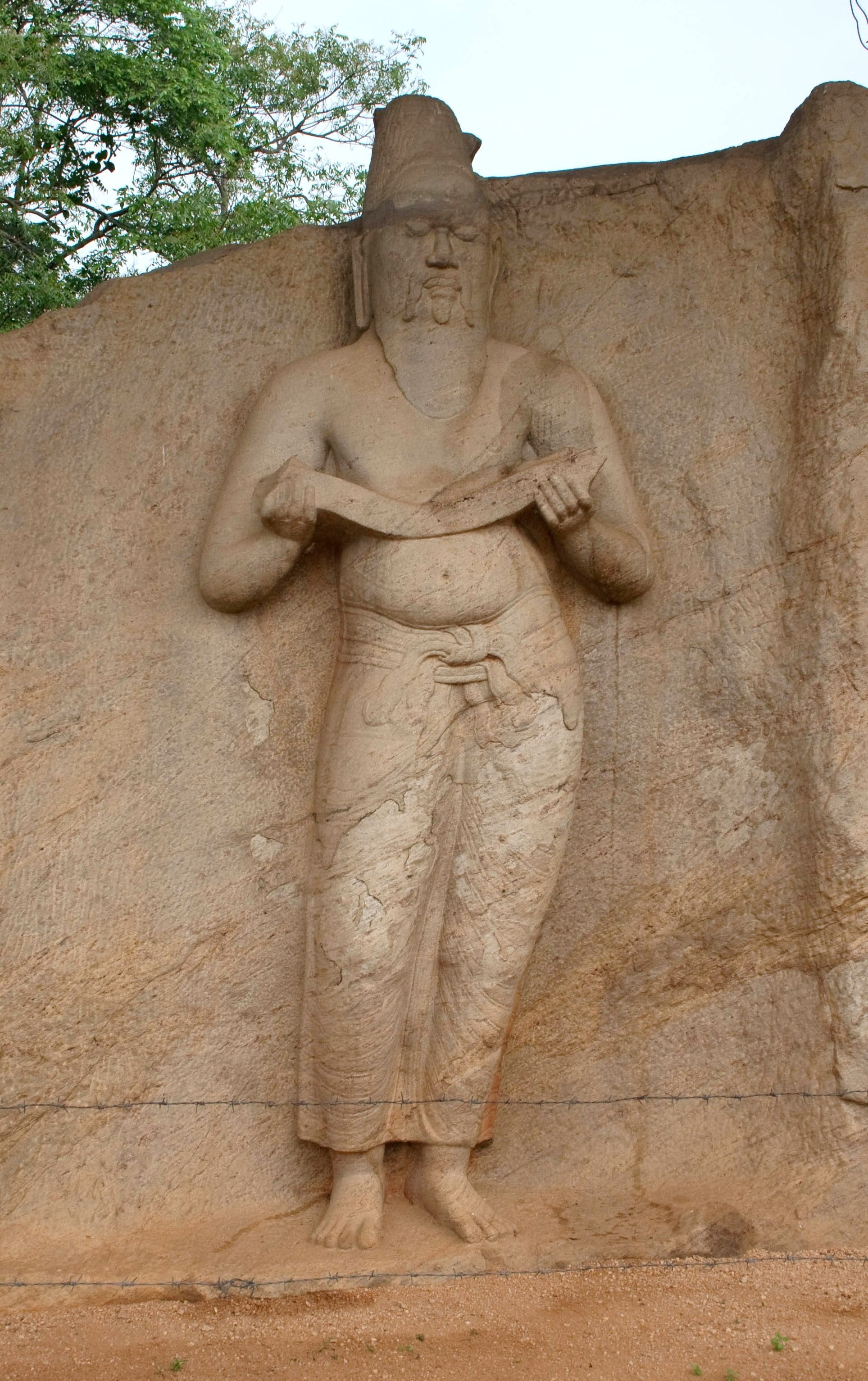
- The statue in Polonnaruwa traditionally held to be of Parākramabāhu the Great

King of Polonnaruwa
- Reign: 1153–1186
- Coronation: 1153
- Predecessor: Manabharana of Ruhuna
- Successor: Vijayabâhu II
- Born: 1123; Punkhagama, Dakkhinadesa
- Died: 1186 (aged 62–63); Polonnaruwa
- Spouse: Queen Leelawathi Queen Rupawathi Queen Subhadra
Names
- Maha Parakramabahu; Deva Parākramabhuja
- House: House of Vijayabahu
- Dynasty: Arya (Note: The monarchy was divided between two monastic branches, the Kalinga, of the Kalingan descendants, and the Arya, of the Pandyan descendants)
- Father: Prince Manabharana of Dakkhinadesa
- Mother: Princess Ratnavali
- Religion: Theravada Buddhism

Parākramabāhu I (Sinhala: මහාරජ පරාක්‍රමබාහු (Maharaja Parakramabahu), c. 1123–1186), or Parakramabahu the Great, was the king of Polonnaruwa from 1153 to 1186. He oversaw the expansion and beautification of his capital, constructed extensive irrigation systems, reorganised the country's army, reformed Buddhist practices, encouraged the arts and undertook military campaigns in South India and Burma. The adage, "Not even a drop of water that comes from the rain must flow into the ocean without being made useful to man" is one of his most famous utterances."

In 1140, Parakramabahu following the death of his uncle, Kitti Sri Megha, Prince of Dakkinadesa, ascended the throne of Dakkhinadesa. Over the next decade, he strengthened both the region’s infrastructure and its military. Following a protracted civil war, he secured power over the entire island around 1153 and remained in this position until his death in 1186. During Parākramabāhu I's reign, he launched a punitive campaign against the kings of Burma, aided the Pandyan dynasty against the Chola dynasty in southern India and maintained extensive trade relations with China, Angkor, and countries in the Middle East. Within the island, he consecrated religious monuments, built hospitals, social welfare units, canals and large reservoirs, such as the Parakrama Samudra, but also banned the advanced practices and books of Mahayana Buddhism.

== Background ==
=== Early ===
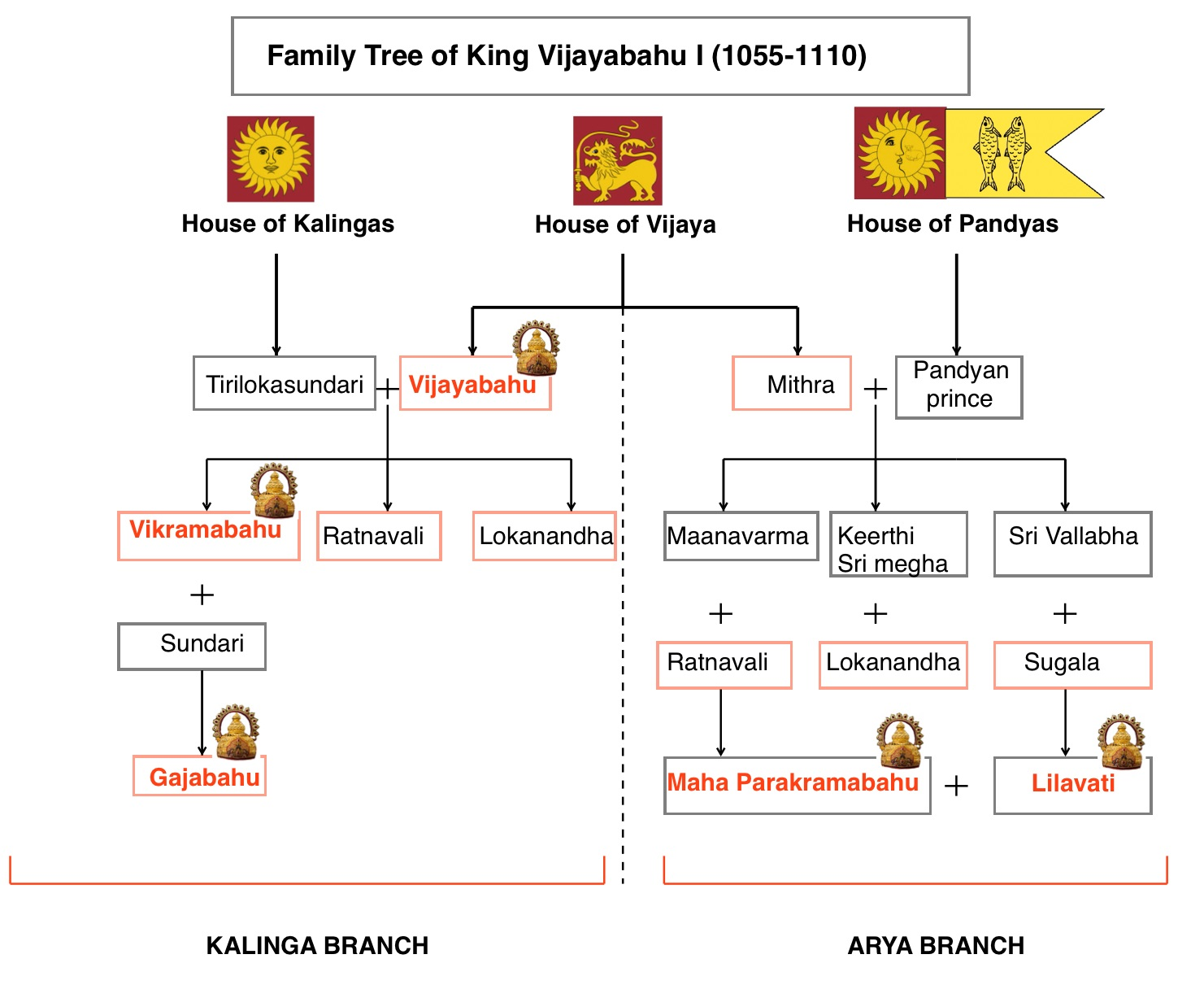
a chart of notable individuals to the throne of Polonnaruwa

The island of Sri Lanka was disrupted by Cholas, following an invasion by Raja Raja Chola I, who took advantage from an internal strife and conquered nearly half of the island. It was not until his successor, the island was almost under Chola control. These regions remained under Chola control until the reign of Vijayabahu I (1070–1100); when Vijayabahu I successfully drove the Chola invaders out of the island, he continued the capital at Polonnaruwa rather than Anuradhapura. By the reign of Vikramabāhu I (1111–1132), the island was divided into three kingdoms—Kingdom of Rajarata, Kingdom of Dakkhinadesa, and Kingdom of Ruhuna. Vijayabahu I had given his sister Mitta's hand in marriage to a Tamil Pandyan prince, and that Pandyan prince would go on to become the father of Manabharana, who in turn was the father of Parakramabahu I. While Vikramabāhu was regarded as the most dignified, as he ruled Rajarata with its sites of religious and historical significance, Manabharana, king of Dakkhinadesa (the Southern Country), along with his brothers Sri Vallabha and Kitti Sri Megha, the joint rulers of Ruhuna, were formidable rivals for the throne. Furthermore, all three were descendants of Vijayabahu’s sister and therefore held a strong claim to the throne; in the Culavamsa, they are referred to as the Arya branch of the royal dynasty, whereas Vikramabāhu I belonged to the Kalinga branch.

=== Birth ===
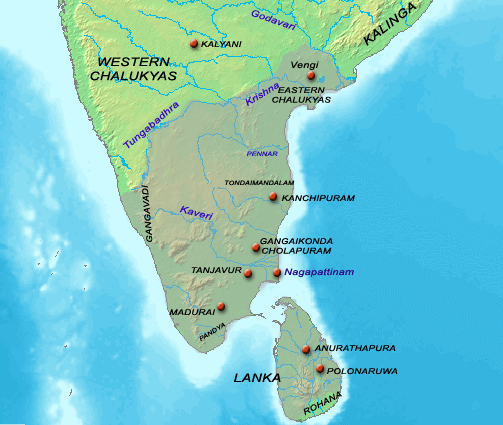
Extent of the Chola Empire on the eve of Vijayabahu I's rebellion

At the time of Parakramabahu’s birth, Manabharana, the governor of Dakkhinadesa and the eldest of the Arya kings, had two daughters, Mitta and Phabavati, but no sons. He said:

We from the pure race of the moon, ... yet we three have been defeated by Vikrama Bahu ... and yet, there seem not any likelyhood of coming to us a son who would wipe off this stain.

On the other hand, his younger brother, Sri Vallabha and his wife Sugala, had two children, one of them being a son, challenged the party of Manabharana. As per this, he stepped down and passed his work to his ministers.

The chronicle further states that Parākramabāhu I’s birth was foretold by a god-like figure appearing in a dream to his father, King Manabharana of Dakkhinadesa. Subsequently, a son was born to Manabharana’s wife, Ratnavali, and was named Parākramabāhu. Though the year of his birth cannot be known exactly confirmed, it is generally thought to be around 1123 AD. The location would almost certainly have been the capital of Dakkhinadesa, Punkhagama.

Upon being informed of the child's birth, Vikramabāhu I in Polonnaruwa ordered that the boy be brought up as the heir to his throne. This kind of adoption may have been an olive branch of sorts on the part of Vikramabāhu, who wished to keep the throne until his death, after which it would be passed on to Parākramabāhu. Manabharana, however, rejected the offer, stating that "It is not (prudent) ... to send away such a jewel of a son". He also speculated that "...if the boy is taken thither, the party of Vikkamabahu... will gleam with mighty, up-shooting flames, but our misfortune, alas so great, will become still worse!"

Soon after the child's birth, Manabharana fell ill and died. His younger brother Kitti Sri Megha, who was joint king of Ruhuna, ascended the throne of Dakkhinadesa, while Sri Vallabha was declared sole king of Ruhuna. Parākramabāhu, his mother Ratnavali and his two sisters Mitta and Pabhavati, were sent to live in Mahanagahula, the capital of Ruhuna, under the care of Manabharana's brother Sri Vallabha.

== Youth ==
=== In Ruhuna and Dakkhinadesa ===
Whilst he was still young, his eldest sister Mitta was forcibly married to their cousin, Manabharana, the son of Sri Vallabha of Ruhuna, against the wishes of Queen Ratnavali. Ratnavali was herself of the Kalinga clan of the royal family, and though she was the widow of a king of the Arya branch of the royal family, she preferred to see her daughters married to a king from the Kalinga clan. During his time at Sri Vallabha's court, Parākramabāhu met his future mahesi "queen consort", Lilavati, Sri Vallabha's daughter, who, went on to rule the country in her own right. (Note: Lilavati would rule Sri Lanka on three separate occasions until her ousting in 1212, from 1197–1200, from 1209–1210 and from 1211-1212 - Paranavitana & Nicholas (1961, p. 345))

In 1132 AD, following the death of Vikramabāhu, his son, Gajabahu II succeeded to the throne of Rajarata. Two monarchs of the Arya branch of the royal family, Sri Vallabha and Kitti Sri Megha, tried unsuccessfully to seize Rajarata by force.

On the other hand, Parākramabāhu, impatient having only a minor state to rule, left Sri Vallabha's palace in Ruhuna and returned to Dakkhinadesa, where he took up residence with his uncle. Impatience is also to be attributed to Sri Vallabha's plans to place Manabharana of Ruhuna on the throne of Rajarata, which made Parākramabāhu's position increasingly precarious in court. In Dakkhinadesa, on the other hand, he was well received by Kitti Sri Megha, who had no sons of his own, where he was essentially adopted.

=== In Rajarata ===
Some time after his coming of age, the young prince left Dakkhinadesa in secrecy and set out for Gajabahu II's realm in Rajarata. Having met his allies at Badalattha (modern Batalagoda), he visited the senapati Sankha, on the border between Rajarata and Dakkhinadesa. When Sankha tried to inform Kitti Sri Megha of the prince's journey, Parākramabāhu had him killed. Parākramabāhu then seized Buddhagama (modern Menikdena Nuwara) and all of Sankha's property. He continued his journey, having evaded a force sent against him by Kitti Sri Megha, who feared complications with the court of Polonnaruwa, and traveled through the Malaya region to Gajabahu's court.

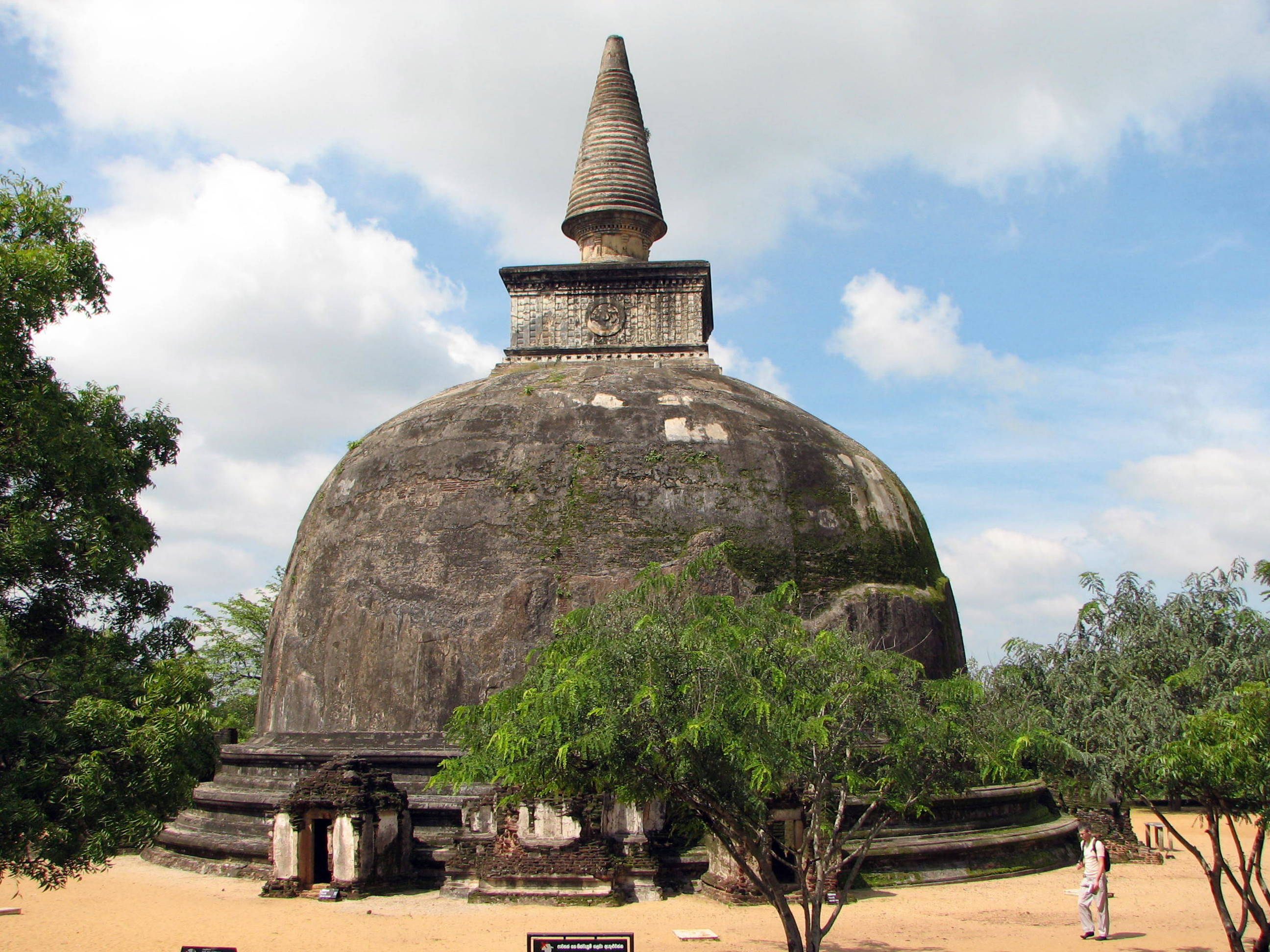
Few Sri Lankan kings built as many dagobas as Parākramabāhu I.

The reason provided for Kitti Sri Megha's efforts to bring the prince back to Dakkhinadesa are presented as nothing more than concern for the well being of his nephew as well as concerns that Parākramabāhu may reignite hostilities between the Arya and Kalinga factions. However, that the king of Dakkhinadesa was "tenderly attached" to his nephew is regarded as "fiction", and it is pointed out that "the spirit in which the accounts of these conflicts are conceived is irreconcilable with the theory of untroubled relations between uncle and nephew."

During his time in Gajabahu's court, the Parākramabāhu did two things of significance. The first was to enmesh the court of Gajabahu in a web of espionage and the other was to marry one of his sisters called Bhaddavati, to King Gajabahu. Through this marriage, Parākramabāhu managed matters that Gajabahu II completely trusted him, as much as he did the royal family. Nevertheless, he retained the entirety of Bhaddavati's dowry for himself. The second was secretly negotiating with Gajabahu's general, Gokanna. However, Gajabahu eventually grew suspicious of Parākramabāhu's activities, and aware, Parākramabāhu departed Rajarata in secrecy by night and returned to Dakkhinadesa.

=== Return to Dakkhinadesa ===
In Dakkhinadesa, Parākramabāhu was reluctant to enter the capital Sankhatthali to see his uncle, King Kitti Sri Megha, until persuaded by his mother Ratnavali to do so. Kitti Sri Megha however died soon after Parākramabāhu's return and the Culavamsa notes that the prince "was not mastered by the agitation called forth by the grief at his father's (sic) death"—perhaps a sign of lingering ill feeling between the two. Parākramabāhu was now king of Dakkhinadesa.

== King of Dakkhinadesa ==
=== Government and construction ===
Parakramabahu was the sole king of Dakkhinadesa by c. 1140; his objective for Dakkhinadesa was to expand it so that it would surpass the greatness of other two kingdoms, in a short period of time. He formed an administration center called Parakramapura, solely for him. The capital of Parakramapura is identified with modern city Panduwas Nuwara.

Afterwards, he started a huge program of construction and renovation of shrines and other structures, the remnants of which can still be seen in North Central Province, Sri Lanka, today. It is mentioned of him as having restored an ancient causeway called the Kotabaddha, over the Deduru Oya (Deduru Lake) near modern Kurunegala. The new king's personality was illustrated when the architects commissioned to the project informed him that it was well-nigh impossible to carry out, to which Parākramabāhu replied that "What is there in the world that cannot be carried out by people of energy?". He ordered the construction of canals and dams, and cleared a large area of forest around them for new fields. Most notably, he constructed the Parakrama Samudra, a giant reservoir from which a large swathe of territory derived its water supply. On islands in the middle of the reservoir he constructed a palace and a stupa. (Note: cited in #Construction)

=== Trade from Dakkhinadesa ===
Trade was a key source of income for Dakkhinadesa, as Sri Lanka’s strategic location had long placed it at the intersection of several major trade routes. Chinese silk was a significant import and was used in the consecration of statues and shrines. Pearls and gems (of which the king took particular interest) constituted an important part of the island's exports, as did cinnamon (which remained, until the 19th century, Sri Lanka's major export), and war elephants. Most trade was carried out through the main seaports of the principality, Kalpitiya, Halawatha (Chilaw) and Colombo.

==== Preparation for war ====
Parākramabāhu resolved to expand the region through a war that lasted over a decade. He first decided to reorganize the guards of Dakkhinadesa kingdom.

Parākramabāhu's army had a diverse ethnic make-up. Some of his officers were from the two grand old clans of Sri Lanka, the Moriya and the Lambakanna, who had between them dominated Rajarata from Anuradhapura. Under a commander styling himself as the king of Malaya (modern Dumbara), the army also included, by the time hostilities broke out between Dakkhinadesa and Rajarata, Veddas, Vellalar, and people from the lower castes who were not traditionally involved in martial activities. The Culavamsa places the number of soldiers at somewhere around 100,000 people but the real figure was probably lower. Parākramabāhu’s army would have included war elephants, cavalry, and siege engines, making it a formidable threat to Gajabahu’s authority in the north.

=== Conquest of Rajarata ===
==== War with Gajabahu ====
Around 1150 AD, Parākramabāhu made his first move by seizing control of Malaya, strategically securing his eastern flank. He then moved his forces against various chieftains on the border of Rajarata. The final stage of this early campaign was the defeat of an army of Gajabahu himself, after which there was a brief ceasefire between the two sides.

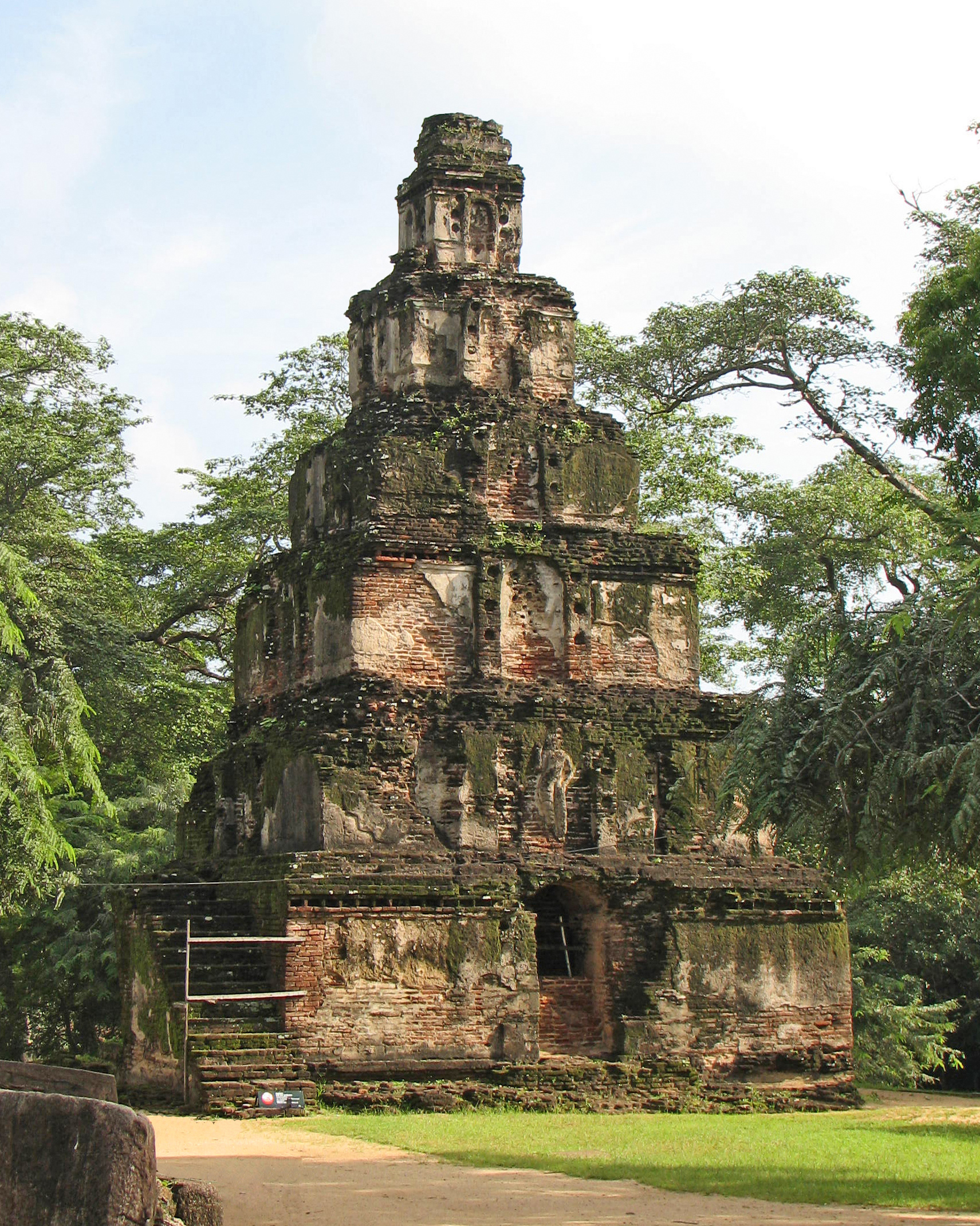
Sathmahal Prasada, a temple in Polonnaruwa bearing a striking similarity to Cambodian architecture, reflecting the ethnically varied populace of the country

Hostilities resumed soon afterwards. Gajabahu had resorted to securing support from abroad, and by the time hostilities resumed between him and Parākramabāhu, the army of Rajarata included nobles of heretical faith from abroad. Parākramabāhu himself did not participate in the invasion of Rajarata, but was responsible for the overall strategy of the campaign, which was based on the writings of Kautilya.

The forces of Dakkhinadesa struck at the fortress of Mallavalana near the mouth of the Kala Oya, seizing it and occupying the western coast of Sri Lanka. The army then sailed up to the north and landed at a place called Muttakara or Mutukara ('Pearl-mine') near modern Mannar, Sri Lanka. In the meantime, Gajabahu's senior general Gokanna suffered several defeats in the vicinity of Kala Wewa and was forced to appeal to Gajabahu in order to receive reinforcements. Despite some initial successes in Malaya, Gokanna was decisively defeated by Parākramabāhu’s general Mahinda. The defeat was so complete that Gokanna fled the battlefield, leaving behind his umbrella—an important status symbol in medieval Sri Lanka. The remnants of his force constructed a fortress in a jungle and took no further part in the war. The retreating forces used horses with carriages to escape into the jungle, with supplies in carriages.

Dakkhinadesi troops advanced through the Amban river and advanced into Bogambara. Afterwards, defeated the heavily reinforced army and bodyguards of Gajabahu, and captured Rajarata. Gajabahu was locked in the palace. Parakramabahu ordered the troops of the Dakkhinadesa army to treat Gajabahu with respect and not to pillage Rajarata.

Despite this, some members of the Dakkhinadesa army are reported to have disregarded his orders, breaking into houses in Rajarata and plundering goods, including raiment and ornaments, from the city’s inhabitants. This pillaging was to have dire consequences for Parākramabāhu. Angered by the actions of the forces of Dakkhinadesa, Gajabahu appealed to Manabharana of Ruhuna, who was at Sorabara, in the center of the country, for assistance.

==== War with Manabharana ====
Parākramabāhu sent his senapathi Deva to restore order to Polonnaruwa, but he found himself in battle with Manabharana of Ruhuna before he could reorganize his troops. The king of Ruhuna kept to his word and delivered Parākramabāhu's forces a crushing blow, driving them from Polonnaruwa. For the Kalinga clan however, the alliance with Manabharana of the Arya clan, backfired and it was soon made clear to Gajabahu that Manabharana intended to keep the city for himself. He put to death many of Gajabahu's senior officials, and imprisoned Gajabahu, letting him starve to death.

Gajabahu then appealed to Parākramabāhu for assistance by secretly sending a message, and Parākramabāhu ordered his troops to cut off grain supplies by roaming around the towns of Manabharana of Ruhuna; the troops blockaded the roads between Ruhuna and Polonnaruwa. As a result, all the people in the town with Manabharana became "weakened birds in a cage". With the sporadic attacks from Dakkhinadesa forces slowly grinding down his power in the north, Manabharana left Polonnaruwa to attack a force commanded by Rakkha that had been wreaking havoc in western Rajarata. In his absence Parākramabāhu's forces seized Polonnaruwa, liberated Gajabahu II, and took into their possession the entirety of the treasure of Manabharana of Ruhuna. The king of Ruhuna returned to his capital with the sacred relics, the tooth relic and the alms bowls.

Gajabahu, who had been set free by Parakramabahu, left Polonnaruwa before Parākramabāhu arrived and decided to leave the country by ship. However, an attack by some of Gajabahu's followers on Parākramabāhu's troops reignited hostilities between the two, and Parākramabāhu had to send his army to capture Gajabahu. By late 1153, after suffering a number of defeats, Gajabahu realized his capture was imminent, and appealed to the Sangha to intervene. They persuaded Parākramabāhu that the ailing king no longer posed a threat, and that he should be allowed to live out the rest of his days in peace. Manabharana tried to woo the king back to the battle against Parākramabāhu, but Gajabahu refused, having the words "I have made over Rajarata to Parākramabāhu" inscribed on a stone tablet (Sangamuwa Inscription) to confirm his abdication in favor of Parākramabāhu. Gajabahu moved to Gantale (Kantalai), where he died in the 22nd year after his coronation as king of Rajarata.

==== Coronation and defeat of Manabharana ====
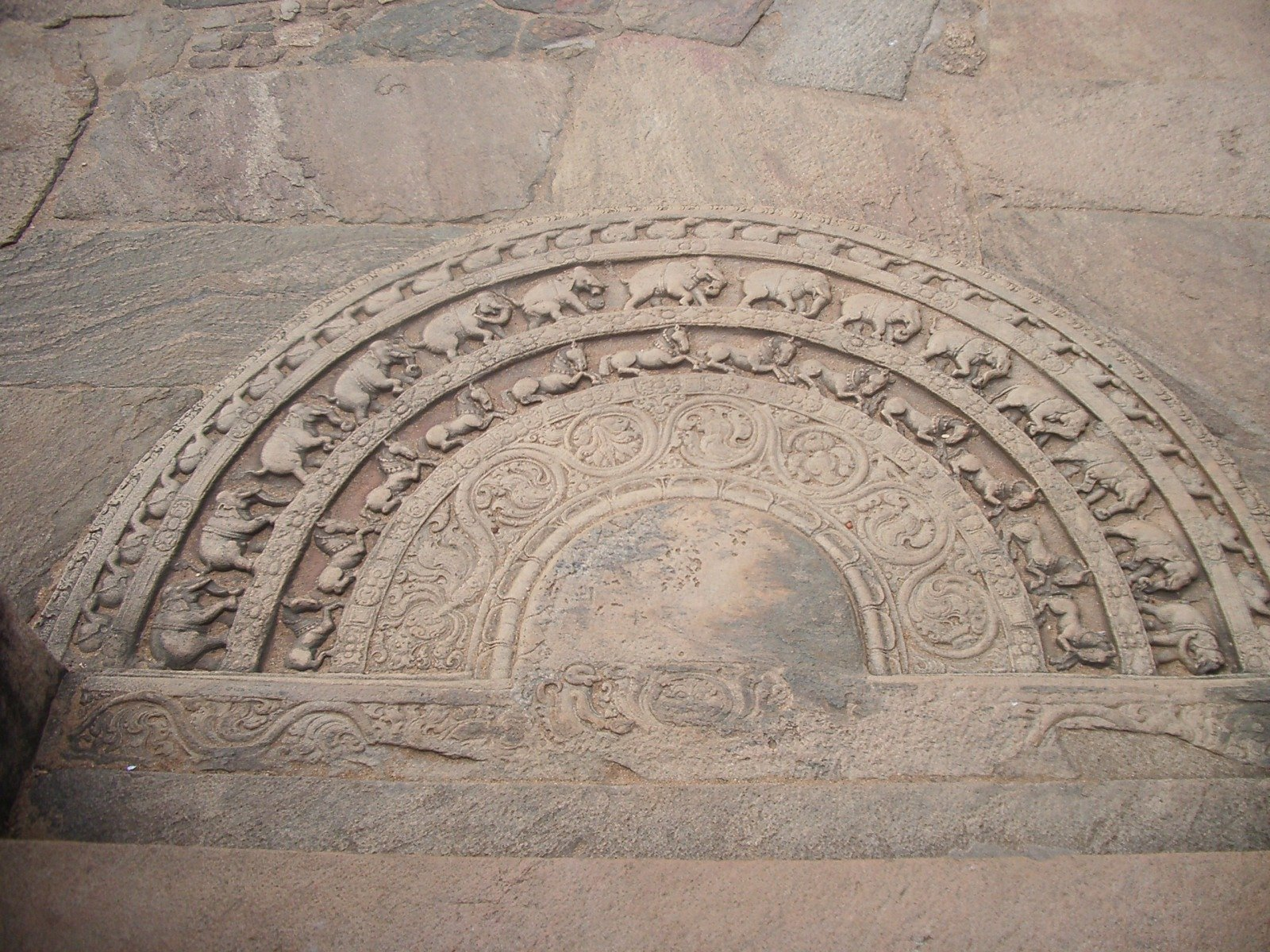
Parākramabāhu's reign was remarkable for the flowering of art forms, as seen in the sandakada pahana of Polonnaruwa.

Parākramabāhu was immediately crowned king of Rajarata, but the war was far from over. Manabharana struck again, sending his armies to the Mahaweli River and attempting to cross into Rajarata via two fords. In the meantime, Narayana, a chieftain based at Anuradhapura, rose in rebellion, and Parākramabāhu's hold in the north was again threatened.

On this occasion Parākramabāhu decided to vanquish Manabharana once and for all; "Not even in Rohana will I permit King Manabharana who is here crushed in war, to find a hold". Rakkha was commanded to hold the fords at the Mahaweli while Parākramabāhu himself attacked from Dakkhinadesa into Ruhuna. Narayan's rebellion was suppressed by another force, leaving Rakkha, who had successfully held the fords at the Mahaweli River, free to invade from the north. Manabharana, supported by some loyalist inhabitants, defeated Dakkhinadesan army and drove them back to Rajarata. Parākramabāhu found himself facing dissension within his own ranks and the defeat of his forces in Malaya; Manabharana even recaptured Polonnaruwa and advanced into Giritale. Despite this Parākramabāhu persevered with the offensive, withdrawing from his southern campaign and concentrating his forces in the north. Manabharana once again found himself besieged in Polonnaruwa. Both sides were exhausted by the incessant warfare of the preceding years, and Manabharana eventually fled the city for Ruhuna. His forces were overtaken at the Mahaweli River by Parākramabāhu's army and annihilated; the king returned to the south in time to pass away from a combination of disease and exhaustion.

Parākramabāhu was finally the unquestioned lord of the entire island of Sri Lanka, even though it had been at the cost of around five years of incessant warfare. In years to come the king himself was to regard this war as one of the most significant events of his reign, mentioning it in several of his edicts carved on stone, such as the one near Devangala. He celebrated by summoning Manabharana's son to Polonnaruwa and concluding a peace with him, followed by a lavish coronation ceremony.

Timeline of accession of Parākramabāhu to the throne
Kingdom	Monarch
Kingdom	1090	1100	1110	1120	1130	1140	1150	1160	1170	1180
Rajarata			Vikramabāhu I			Gajabāhu II
Dakkhinadesa	Vijayabāhu I		Manabharana		Kitti Sri Megha		Parākramabāhu I
Ruhuna			Sri Vallabha & Kitti Sri Megha		Sri Vallabha	Manabharana

== Reign ==
Parākramabāhu established himself at Polonnaruwa (Pulatthinagara as mentioned in the Chulavamsa) from 1153 onwards and ruled over the entirety of Sri Lanka for the next 33 years. During this time he undertook much of the work he is best remembered for, most significantly in the areas of religious reform, construction, and war.

=== Economic policies and trade ===
Shipwrecks were common on the area. Goods from ships were halved as long they didn't carry horses or elephants. Parākramabāhu's economic theory was largely based on the teachings of Kautilya, these could be an equivalent of what's known as state capitalism. As such, all trade, including Alcohol, were carried by the government. This aside from reducing alcoholism in the Sri Lankan society, also ensured the local produce was of the highest quality. During his rule, he also imposed a tax policy to fund government expenditures.

=== Religious reform ===
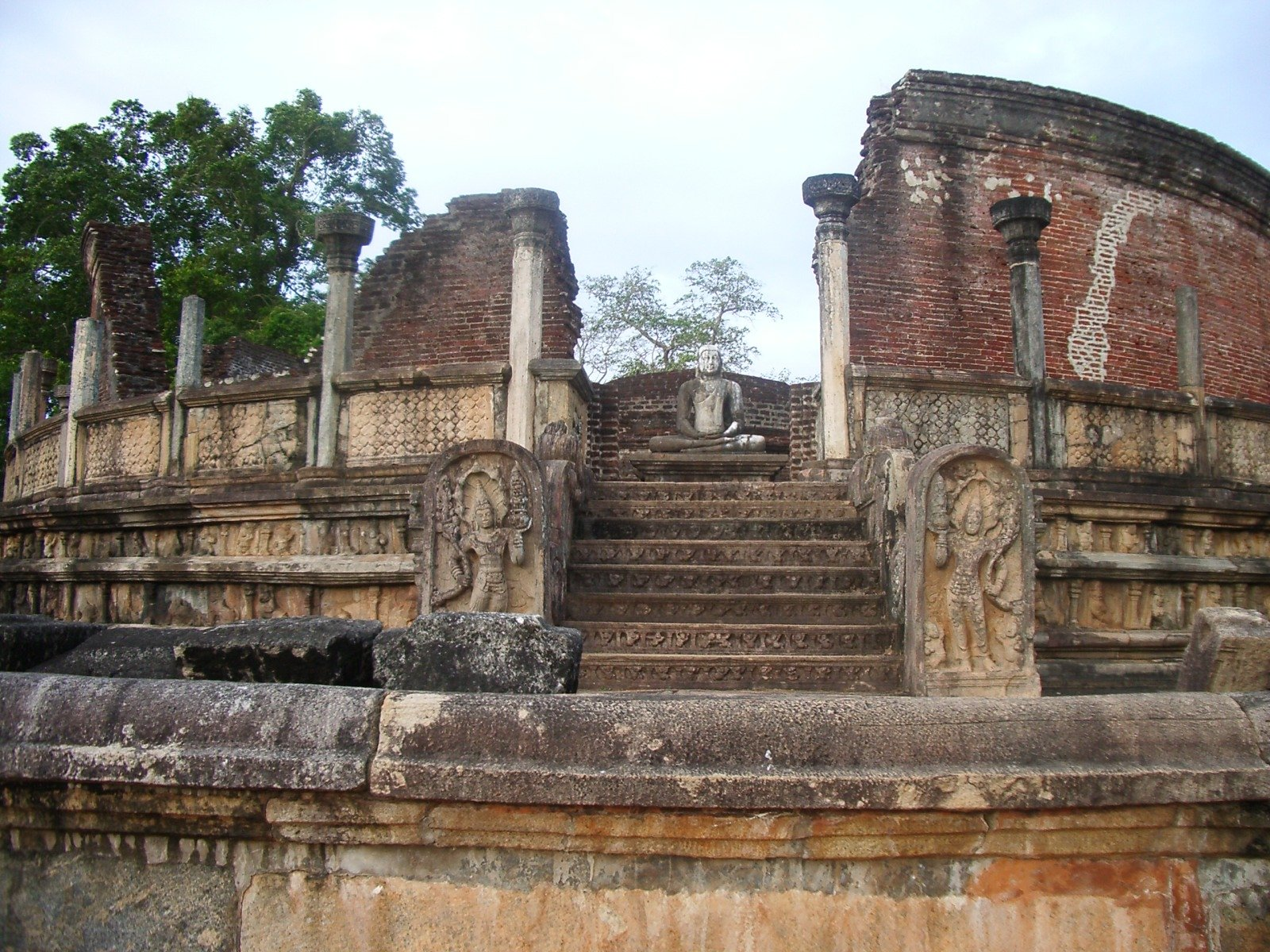
Parākramabāhu's Temple of where he stored the Tooth Relic

During the reign of king Vaṭṭagāmini Abhaya (104 BCE, 88–76 BCE), the sangha of the country had divided into three rival orders—the orders of the Mahavihara, Abhayagiri vihāra and Dakkhina vihara. (Note: The Mahayana was influential in the Abhayagiri vijara) One of Parākramabāhu's ambitions was the reunification of these groups into one order, as had existed at the time of Dutugamunu. Furthermore, much of the sangha had become corrupted over the years, with bhikkhus marrying and having children, and in many cases behaving much like upāsakas in their pursuit of worldly gain.

In c. 1165, a Theravada council was called in Polonnaruwa to discuss the reform of the sangha. Parākramabāhu's chief agent in the enterprise was to be the Mahathera Kassapa, an experienced monk who "knew the Tipiṭaka and was exceedingly well versed in the Vinaya". There was immense resistance to Parākramabāhu's efforts, in particular from the Abhayagiri sect who practiced advanced practices of Mahayana Buddhism. Many monks moved abroad rather than face such severe religious bigotry, whilst some others simply abandoned the cloth and returned to lay life. In this they may well have been encouraged by Parākramabāhu, who seems to have felt that the "purification" of the priestly orders depended as much on the expulsion and exclusion of the religious minority as it did on the rewarding and encouragement of the orthodox. Finally, the king summoned the leaders of the sangha on the island once a year, centering the visit on a ritual on the banks of the Mahaweli river—possibly a practical means of keeping up-to-date with their progress and their standards. After Parakramabahu's repression, Mahayana and Vajrayana in Sri Lanka never recovered.

Following the crushing of rebellions in Ruhuna, in 1157, Parākramabāhu recovered the Tooth relic and the alms bowls from Ruhuna and brought them to Polonnaruwa; afterwards placed the relics in a shrine known as the Temple of the Tooth Relic in Polonnaruwa. Such constructions became a hallmark of Parākramabāhu's reign; his buildings for the reformed sangha are described in great detail in the Culavamsa and are often accompanied with inscriptions stating his intentions and accomplishments, such as at the Gal Vihara. A large revival of Theravada is recorded during the time of Parakramabahu.

=== Construction ===
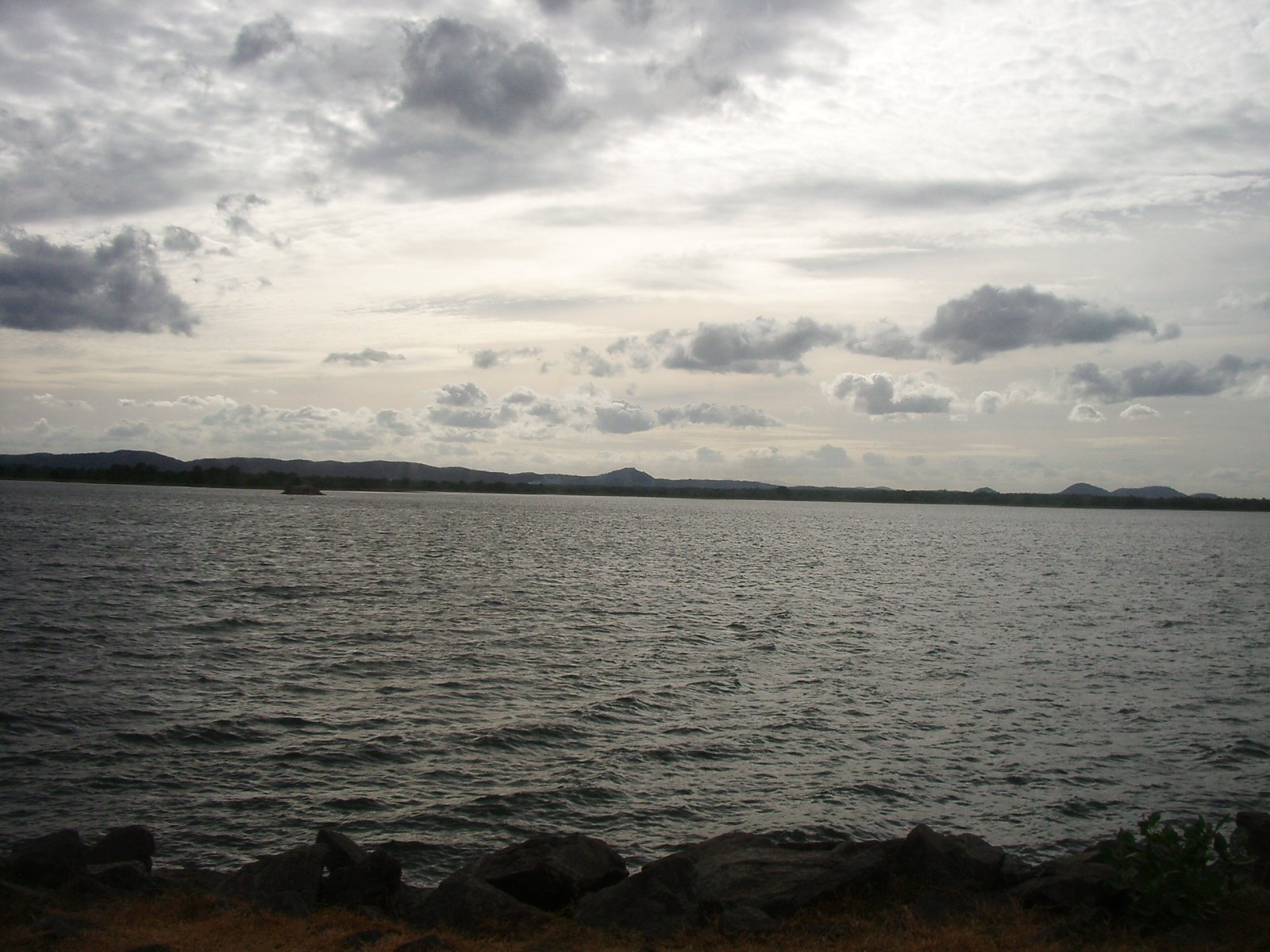
The Parakrama Samudra (Sea of Parakarama), the largest irrigation tank built by Parakramabahu

Parākramabāhu's constructions work made up a significant chunk of the material history of Sri Lanka. Much of the remnants of Polonnaruwa date from his reign, as well as sites in western and south-eastern Sri Lanka. One of Parākramabāhu's first projects was the restoration of Anuradhapura, including the restoration of Thuparamaya (which had been lost to the jungle), Mihintale, and Ruwanwelisaya. Parakramabahu, having abolished his office at Parakramapura of Dakkhinadesa, turned his attention on Polonnaruwa. Unsurprisingly, due to the near-yearly sieges, the city had suffered and had reached a state that nothing but its name remained. It is perhaps because of this that so little of pre-12th century Polonnaruwa remains until today.

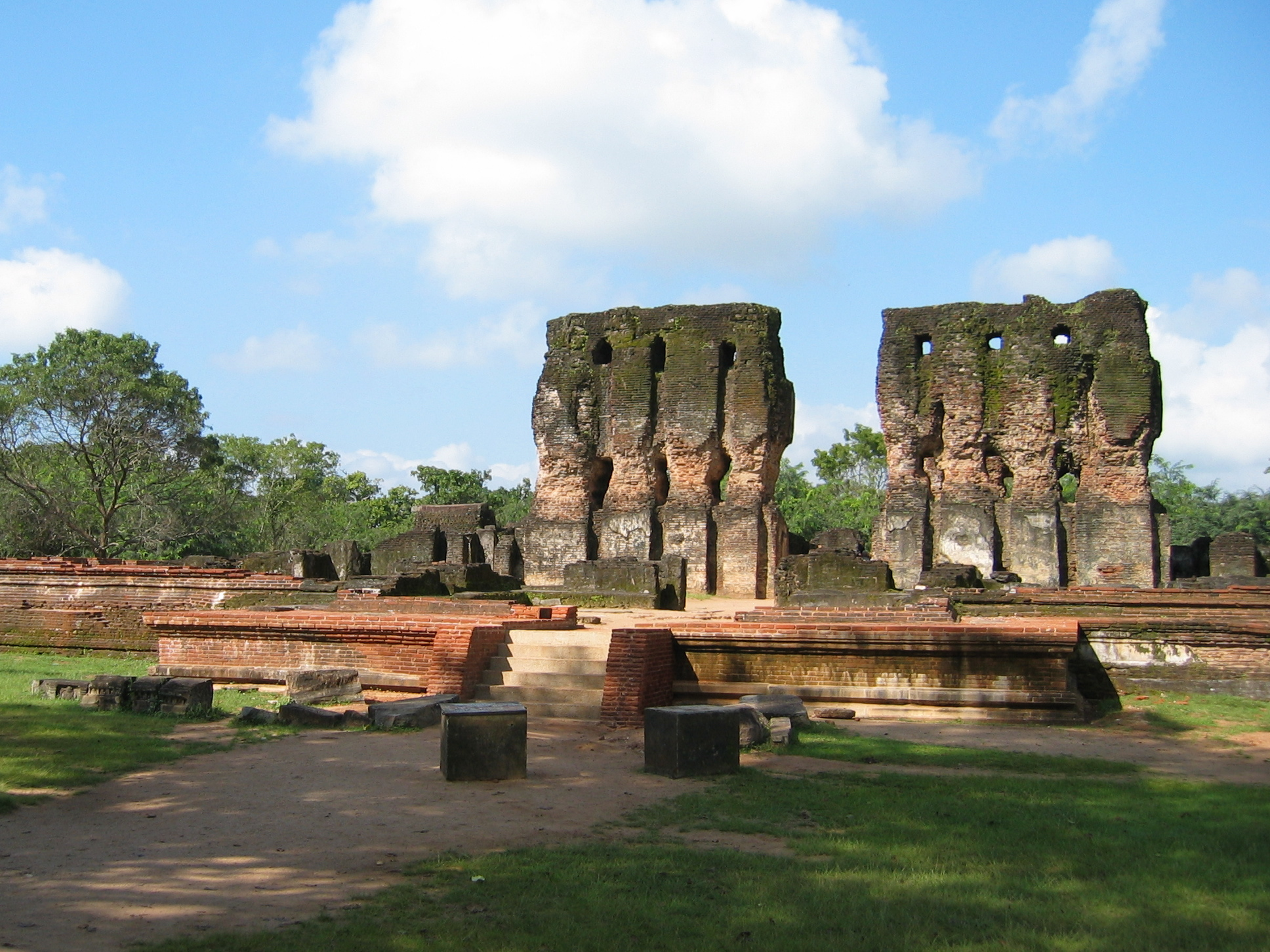
The royal palace of Polonnaruwa.

It is said that the city was initially divided into four districts, each marked with its own alms-giving house for the clergy, containing "vessels of bronze, cushions and pillows, mats, carpets and bedsteads". He ordered the construction of hospitals, which he visited on several occasions. He also expanded Polonnaruwa's defensive walls, constructing an elaborate three-walled complex featuring turrets for archers and fourteen gates. None of which has survived till modern times. Beyond the city precinct it is believed he constructed or renovated three smaller townships, in addition to Parakramapura - Rajavesi Bhujanga, Raja Kulantaka (Sinhapura), and Vijitapura. Extensive gardens were also laid down around Polonnaruwa, featuring ponds and bathing-pools, one of which, the Twin Pools, survives till this date. One such garden, the 'Island Garden', extended into the middle of Thupa Wewa ('Wewa' meaning 'tank' or 'reservoir' in Sinhala) on a promontory.

Much else survives, such as the Gal Vihare, or "Stone Shrine", near Polonnaruwa. The Culavamsa attributes the monument in its entirety to Parākramabāhu, though in truth his contribution may have been extensive refurbishment. The Polonnaruwa Vatedage, considered the peak construction out of all Vatadage temples ("Circular Shrine"), was constructed around 1157, likely to store the tooth relic. The Lankatilaka Temple, Alahena Pirivena, Jetavanaramaya and the Demala Maha Cetiya were also constructed in his reign. At the center of Polonnaruwa Parākramabāhu expanded and beatified the royal palace, with audience halls and bathing ponds. Little of it remains today, but its soaring walls hint at the grand scale of the king's vision.

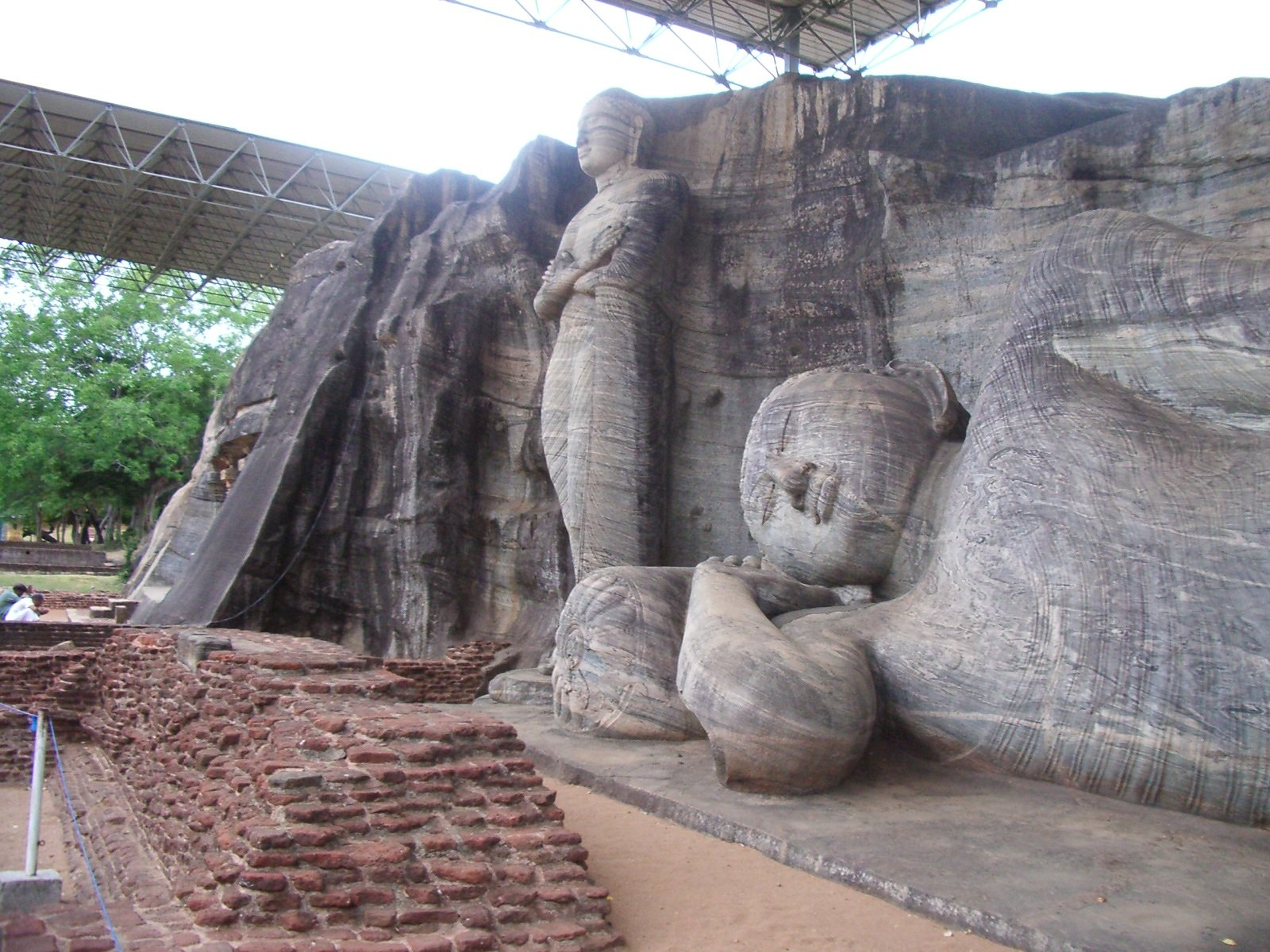
Gal Vihare ('The Stone Shrine') features three statues of the Buddha in three different poses carved from the same large rock.

Parākramabāhu also continued his program of hydraulic works begun in Dakkhinadesa, including the renovation and reconstruction of reservoirs and canals wrecked during the Chola invasion. He built the Parakrama Samudra which is 2,400 hectares (5,928 acres) of water. Inscriptions detailing his work can be found at the Maha Wewa near Uruwela, Padavi Wewa and Panda Wewa in North-Western Province. A column discovered at the bottom of the Padavi Wewa in the 19th century included the inscription "Made for the benefit of the whole world by the prosperous Sri Parakrama-Bahu, born at Sinhapura, minded of what was fit to be done". Though the Culavamsa attributes the construction of various tanks to him, it has been suggested that much of Parākramabāhu's work was renovation, and indeed that some of the projects undertaken by his successor, Nissanka Malla of Polonnaruwa, may have been attributed to him. In the Culawamsa, Parākramabāhu is said to have restored or constructed over 165 large tanks, in addition he renovated 2376 minor tanks and 3910 canals and 163 dams.

Despite their magnificence, Parākramabāhu's works exacted a heavy toll on the populace and the treasury. For much of the work in Anuradhapura he utilized Tamil prisoners of war seized during the Pandyan War, the POWs were revengefully sent to repair those destroyed during the Chola invasion. Nevertheless taxation and rajakariya (a feudal system in which work was owed to the king by commoners) contributed in large part to the projects. An interesting indicator of the burden of taxation is the disappearance of larger gold coins towards the end of Parākramabāhu's reign.

=== Military campaigns ===
Parākramabāhu's reign is memorable for two major campaigns—in the south of India as part of a Pandyan war of succession, and a punitive strike against the kings of Ramañña (Lower Burma) for various perceived insults to Sri Lanka. He also had to suppress wars against him in Ruhuna on several occasions.

==== Revolts ====
In 1156, Queen Sugala of Ruhuna, the mother of Manabharana of Ruhuna who had fought Parākramabāhu bitterly for the throne, joined a revolt against Parākramabāhu. The situation turned dire when a group of mercenaries took the opportunity afforded by the absence of Parākramabāhu's army, and his most formidable general Rakkha, to revolt in 1157. The revolt was organized by the army of Ruhuna.

Parākramabāhu dispatched another general, Bhuta, to assist Rakkha, who had become bogged down in conflict in Ruhuna. Despite reinforcements, Rakkha still appear to have become stuck in a war of attrition not unlike Parākramabāhu's wars for the throne. Certainly it outlasted a simultaneous rebellion in the north, which after three months of fighting ended after an engagement in the vicinity of Dik Wewa. The only major victory of this early phase of the rebellion in Ruhuna was the seizure of the Sacred Relics in late 1157.

One of former enemies of Parakramabahu, a general named Sukarabhatudev, who was a POW, escaped and went to Badulla, where he commanded forces against the armies of Parākramabāhu. During the war, Rakkha fell ill and died subsequently.

The tide finally turned when reinforcements arrived in Ruhuna, probably in early 1158, through Sabaragamuwa, and from the western coast. Mahagama was seized and Queen Sugala captured. The forces of Parākramabāhu then inflicted mass killings on the nobility and citizens of Ruhuna, seemingly accepted by Parākramabāhu. "They caused many foes to whom severity was due, to be brought before them, and at villages and market-towns they had numbers of stakes set up on which they impaled many hundreds of the enemy. Many other foes they had hanged on the gallows and burnt and showed forth in every way the majesty of Parākramabāhu". It may well have been the case that the king was tired of the constant animosity directed at him by the kingdom. The brutal suppression of the rebellion ensured that, apart from a brief insurrection in 1160, Ruhuna remained quiet for the rest of his reign. The fate of Queen Sugala is not recorded.

The only other rebellion of Parākramabāhu's reign occurred in the region of modern Mantota in from 1168–1169.

==== War with Bagan ====
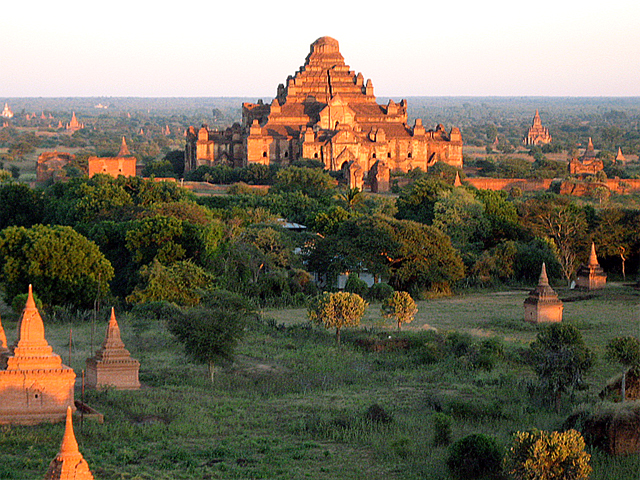
Bagan, the capital of the kingdom against which Parākramabāhu launched an invasion in 1164

The Bagan Kingdom in modern Burma and Sri Lanka enjoyed a cordial relationship based on trade and a common Theravada Buddhist faith for a long time. Bagan emerged as a power in the 9th century and by the 11th century its capital city, Arimaddhanapura, was a centre of Buddhist learning. Bagan was also a long-time opponent of the Chola dynasty. However with the accession of Narathu (1167–1171), to the throne, and the hostilities between the Angkor and Burma, the situation changed dramatically. According to Sri Lankan sources, the new king caused several grievances and mistreated Sri Lankan envoys to the kingdom.

Whatever the reason, Parākramabāhu was incensed. After preparing a navy at Pallavavanka, he dispatched to Bagan a formidable naval force. The size of the army is not known, but it is recorded as containing a year's supply of grains, specially modified arrows, and war elephants. The army arrived at a city near the Bago River and captured it. Thereafter, the armies are said to have captured several other cities, including Arimaddhanapura, assassinated Narathu, and restored relations between the two countries to normal.

The account of the campaign in Bagan is possibly exaggerated, particularly as Burmese chronicles do not mention any massive invasion. However, they do note that Narathu was assassinated, potentially by Sri Lankans. Furthermore, a contemporary inscription at Devanagala mentions the awarding of land to the general Kitti Nagaragiri for his leadership in a campaign to 'Ramanna', naming the king of Bagan as 'Bhuvanaditta', a possible Sinhalization of 'Narathu'.

George Coedes states Parakramabahu I then launched the retaliatory raid in 1180 (even after the Pandyan war), after Narapatisithu (son of Narathu) imprisoned Sinhalese envoys.

==== Pandya War, 1169–1177 ====
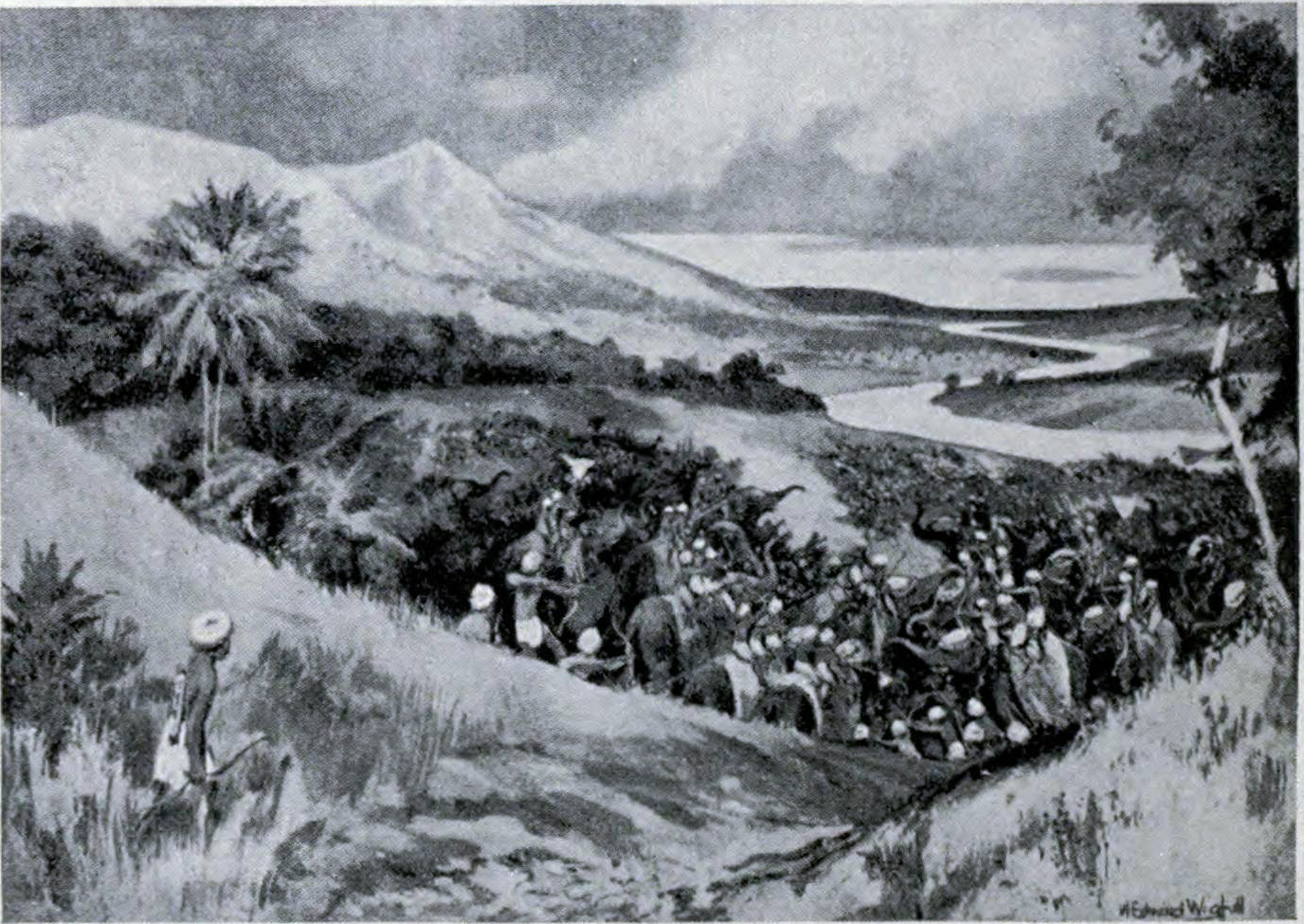
Parakramabahu I and Vira Pandyan invaded Pandya Kingdom

In 1167 the Pandyan king Parakrama appealed to his namesake in Sri Lanka for assistance against an alliance of his rival Kulasekhara Pandya and the Cholas. Such an appeal was not unusual, as the Pandya had long found allies in the Sinhalese monarchs, specially wars against the Cholas, and their nobility had spent some time in exile at the court of Mahinda IV (956–972) after the invasion of their land by Parantaka Chola II.

On this occasion however the Sri Lankan help came too late. By the time Parākramabāhu's general Lankapura Dandanatha arrived in Pandya Nadu, Kulasekhara had captured the capital city of Madurai and killed Parakrama's wife and children. His son Prince Vira Pandu however had managed to escape. Rather than head for Madurai, Lankapura landed in the vicinity of Ramanathapuram and captured the city of Rameswaram, which remained in Sri Lankan hands till the reign of Nissanka Malla. Here they built a fortress called Parakramapura. In this early phase of the war they allied with Vira Pandyan army and fought Kulasekhara on several occasions, eventually laying siege to him in Madurai and seizing the city. Vira Pandya was restored to power and crowned as the Pandyan King, also the Lankapura's army remained in Madurai, and continued to engage the Cholas, eventually raiding the Chola territory and striking fear into its feaudatories. Then Cholas decided to fight against Lankapura's army, then came news from Pilai Pallavarayar that the commanders including Jayadratha (Jagath Vijaya) and Lankapura Dandanatha and the entire army from Sri Lanka had sustained defeat and retreated. The Culavamsa dedicates much of chapter LXXVII to a description of the ensuing war between Lankapura and Kulasekhara, who apparently fought on with assistance from the Cheras. However the account ends abruptly.

Kulasekhara Pandya subsequently obtained assistance from the Cholas and returned to fight Lankapura's army again in Madurai. However, Lankapura defeated them again. Then Cholas decided to fight against Lankapura's army again, then came news from Pilai Pallavarayar that the commanders including Jayadratha (Jagath Vijaya) and Lankapura Dandanatha and the entire army from Ceylon had sustained defeat and retreated. He ordered the Sri Lankan currency of Kahapana to be used in the area in Pandyan Kingdom under Vira Pandyan control. The Tamil prisoners of war captured by Lankapura's army were sent to Sri Lanka to repair the Ruwanweli Seya and other buildings damaged by earlier Chola invasions of the country.

Ancient Sinhalese sources say that Lankapura returned to Sri Lanka after his victory, and was welcomed by Parakramabahu I as a great war hero and was well rewarded. But there can be no doubt, that in the report of Parakkamabahu I's campaigns in Southern India, Sinhalese sources suppresses the fact of the failures which overtook the expedition after its first success. The fact itself is confirmed by South Indian inscriptions that sinhalese soldiers lost this war and generals along with soldiers were nailed to the gates of Madhura. The narrative in the Culavamsa ends abruptly. But we learn from South Indian inscriptions that Parakkamabahu's general was defeated and his head with those of his officers was nailed to the gates of Madhura. Ceylon account is certainly one sided, and describes the war in true epic fashion. The victory is all in favour of the Ceylonese generals, and yet we find ultimately Vira Pandya does not find himself settled upon his throne firmly, ruling over the country subjugated to his authority

Archeological Chola inscriptions such as the Tiruvalangadu inscription of Rajadhiraja II and Arapakkam inscription confirms that Rajadhiraja II ordered his commander Thirumala Perumanambi along with a strong army with specific instructions to kill Lankapura and Jagath Vijaya of the Polonnaruwa Army and hang their heads from the gates of the palace of Madurai and Conquer Pandyan kingdom. Pallavarayar alias Tirucirrambalamudaiyan Perumanambi, who was entrusted with these tasks, entertained Kulasekhara suitably during his stay in the Chola country, and having with his army, resources and zeal, brought about the reconquest of the Pandiyan kingdom, he carried out his master's orders to the letter by nailing the heads of Lankapura Dandanatha and others (other Soldiers) to the gates of Madura. The war thus ended in favour of the Cholas, sometime in the 1170s.

Following rumours that Parakramabahu I was preparing for another invasion, Rajadhiraja II sent a brigade commanded by Annan Pallavarayan to launch a pre-emptive strike. Annan sailed to Sri Lanka and destroyed Parakramabahu's preparations for the invasion. The Cholas also provided support to Sinhalese Prince Sri Vallabha, nephew of Parakramabahu and a rival claimant to the Polonnaruwa throne. Sri Vallabha decided to stay in the Chola camp, assisting the Cholas.

The expedition that was sent with Srivallabha at its head captured and destroyed several places in Ceylon, including Pulaiccēri and Mahathitha, where Parākramabāhu I was gathering his forces; it seized many elephants and set fire to a considerable area extending over twenty kādams from east to west and seventy kādams from north to south, killing some of the Sinhalese chieftains of the locality and taking other soldiers captive as prisoners of war. The booty captured in the course of the expedition was then duly presented to the Chola king by Annan Pallavarāyan who thus successfully counteracted all the machinations of the Ceylonese ruler.

According to K. A. Sastri Nilakanta, Parakramabahu did a volte-face by sending costly gifts such as jewels and gold to Kulasekhara convincing him to invade the Chola Kingdom. Kulasekhara invaded the Cholas but was defeated and driven out. Chola forces then successfully invaded the Pandya kingdom and reinstalled the Prince Vira Pandya on the throne.

== Death and legacy ==
=== Succession ===
The Culavamsa states only that Parākramabāhu "carried on rule for thirty-three years", and that he died in Polonnaruwa. He was succeeded by Vijayabahu II of Polonnaruwa, described as his "sister's son", who he had summoned from Sinhapura, capital of Kalinga. His place of burial is unknown. Vijayabahu II brought back the friendly relations between Polonnaruwa and Rāmmana, who Parākramabāhu fought against during his reign.

Despite his personal reputation and authority, it is noted by historians such as H.W Corrington and Wilhelm Geiger, that Parākramabāhu did not take any steps towards ensuring a smooth succession. One reason offered is the strength of Sri Lankan conventional law, which contained fairly fluid conventions for the replacement of rulers. Excluding Nissanka Malla, all the successors of him appears to have been weak. The chronic instability and the renewal of the civil war of the years following the end his reign undid many of his constructions.

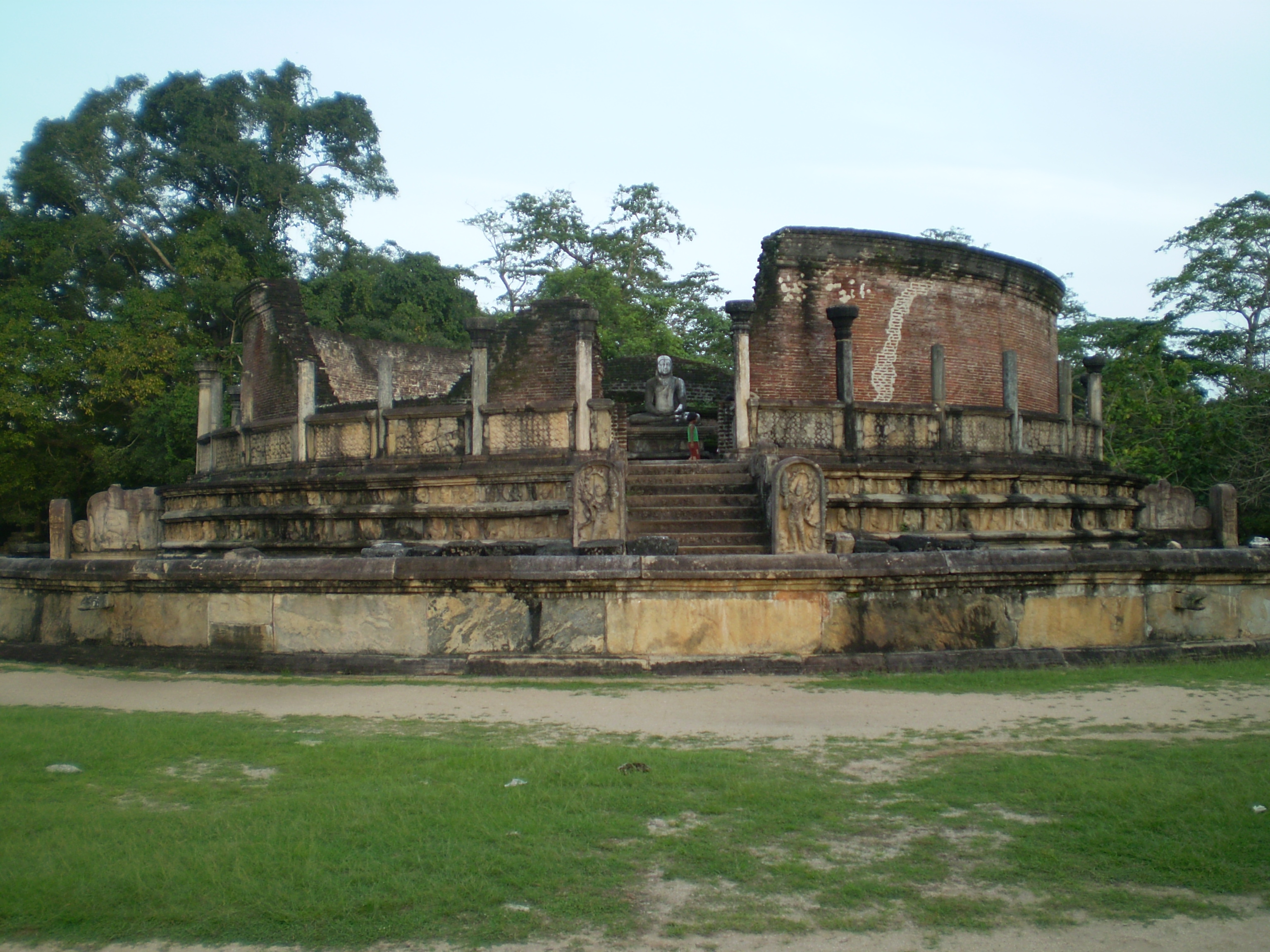
The Vatadage which was discovered

Furthermore, Polonnaruwa was lost to jungle, only to be discovered by the Department of Archeology of Ceylon in 1903. Harry Charles Purvis Bell in 1903 noted that it was mostly destroyed.

=== Legacy and issues ===
During his reign, Sinhalese power failed to contribute to the destabilizing of the Chola dynasty of south India thus the Parākramabāhu's designs had been totally frustrated and his candidates steadily kept out of the Madura kingdom. Repeated expeditions of his forces on the mainland had been successfully met and in spite of temporary victories, the ruler of Ceylon had lost heavily in the fighting and his military and naval resources had been greatly damaged.That under Rājādhirāja the Cõļa empire continued to retain the same proportions as under Rājarāja II may be inferred from the provenance of his inscriptions which are found in Nellore and Kāļahasti and Nandalūr. Sinhalese forces continued to have a presence in Rameswaram till the end of the reign of Nissanka Malla. There are also records of Sinhala presence in Rameswaram until well into the reign of King Nissanka Malla (1187–1196).

Furthermore the sheer size and extent of the king's construction projects can still be seen in Polonnaruwa today, as well as in the various carvings dotted around the country vaunting the accomplishments of the "Great King". However such success came at a price. Relentless warfare took its toll on the country and taxation was high under his reign and high-value coinage all but disappeared towards the end of his rule, a sign of increasing poverty.

His other weakness was the lack of restraint in his spending, taking Sri Lanka to greater heights that it had reached in a long time, but exhausting the island's resources in the process.

=== Name ===
The popularity of Parākramabāhu is attested by the fact that no less than seven monarchs adopted his name over the next four centuries, of whom only two or three could lay claim to even a fraction of his successes. The Sri Lankan Navy has two ships named after Parakramabahu.

== See also ==
- Mahavamsa
- List of monarchs of Sri Lanka
- History of Sri Lanka
- Architecture of ancient Sri Lanka

== Notes ==
Parakramabahu I House of Vijayabahu Born: ? 1123 Died: ? 1186
Regnal titles
Preceded by Gajabahu II	King of Polonnaruwa; 1153–1186	Succeeded by Vijayabahu II
