= Arapakkam, Kanchipuram =

Arpakkam
- village
- Location in Tamil Nadu, India Arpakkam (India)
- Coordinates: 12.734°N 79.761°E
- Country: India
- State: Tamil Nadu
- District: Kanchipuram
- Block: Kanchipuram

Area
  - Total: 8.3407 km^{2} (3.2204 sq mi)
- Elevation: 65 m (213 ft)

Population (2011)
  - Total: 2,937
  - Density: 352.1/km^{2} (912.0/sq mi)

Languages
  - Official: Tamil
- Time zone: UTC+5:30 (IST)

Arpakkam is a village in the Kanchipuram district of Tamil Nadu, India. According to the 2011 census of India, it has a population of 2937.

== History ==
The Arpakkam inscription, dated to the fifth regnal year of the Chola ruler Rajadhiraja II (r. c. 1166–1178), states that a Chola chieftain had granted the village to a religious leader named Umapati-deva (also known as Jnana-Siva and Svamidevar). The inscription states that Umapati-deva was a native of the Dakṣina Rāḍha (present-day West Bengal), and had migrated to the southern Chola kingdom. Around this time, the Sinhala army captured the neighbouring Pandya kingdom, and then began offensives against the Chola feudatories. The Chola chieftain Edirilisola Sambuvarayan appointed Umapati-deva to offer prayers and conduct worship rituals, in order to avert this crisis. After 28 days of worship, Sambuvarayan received a letter from his son , the Chola general Pallavarayan, informing him that the Sinhala generals Jayadratha, Lankapuri and others had retreated. Believing that Umapati-deva had divine powers, Sambuvarayan granted him the village of Alpakkam (modern Arpakkam), comprising 167 velis of land, as a tax-free endowment.

== Temples ==
Arapakkam has 1000-year old Jain, Shiva and Adi Kesava Perumal temples. The Perumal temple housed 3 statues of Buddha as well.

=== Idol theft ===
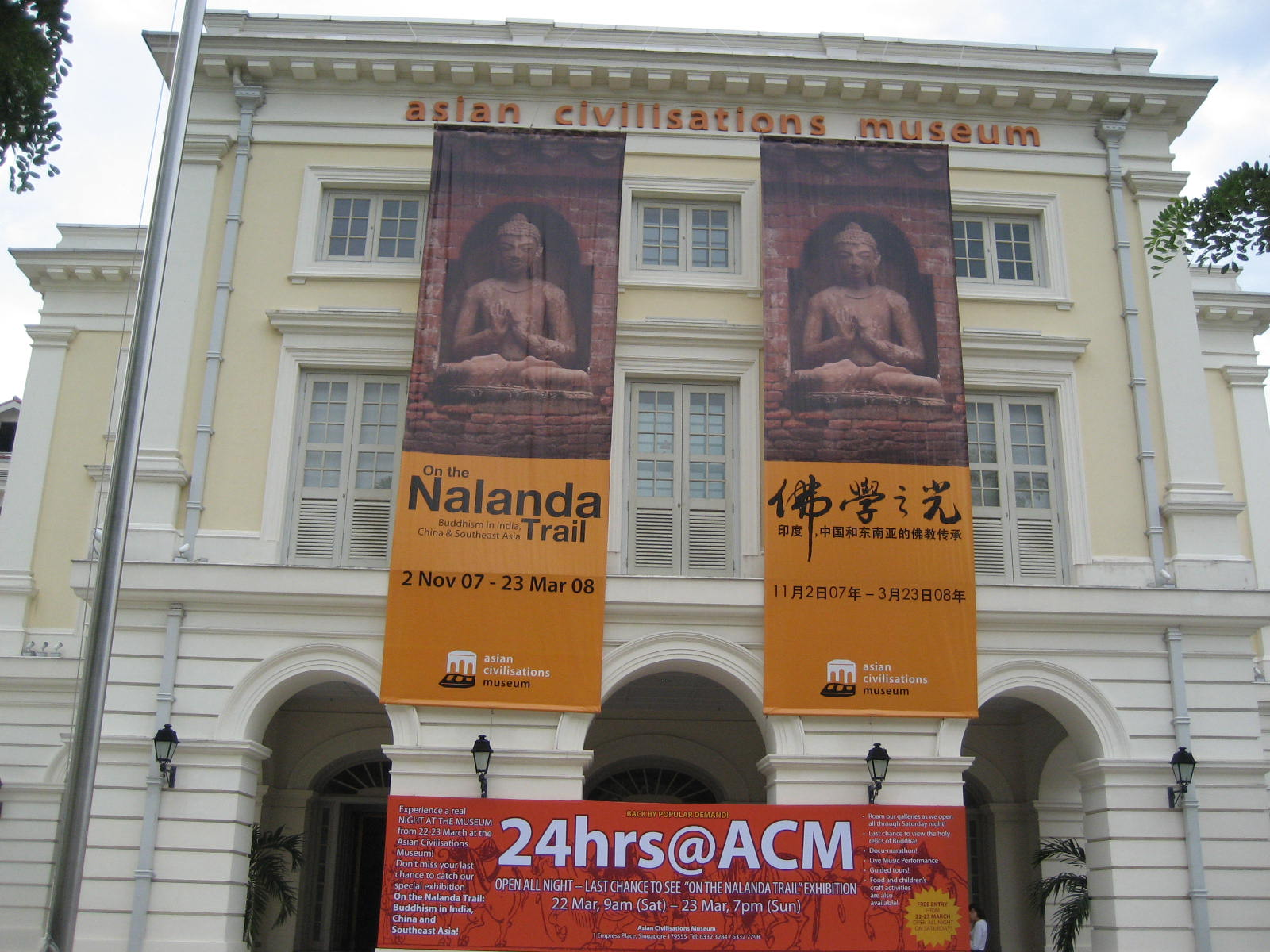
On the Nalanda Trail, ACM Singapore

A seated Buddha statue from the Perumal temple was stolen on the night of 25 November 2003 and smuggled abroad. The statue was then spotted in the exhibition named On the Nalanda Trail at Asian Civilisations Museum, Singapore, where it was advertised as Nagapattinam Buddha. The so-called Nagapattinam Buddha was later seized in New York by the Homeland Security in 2012.
