= Parakrama Samudra =

Parakrama Samudraya
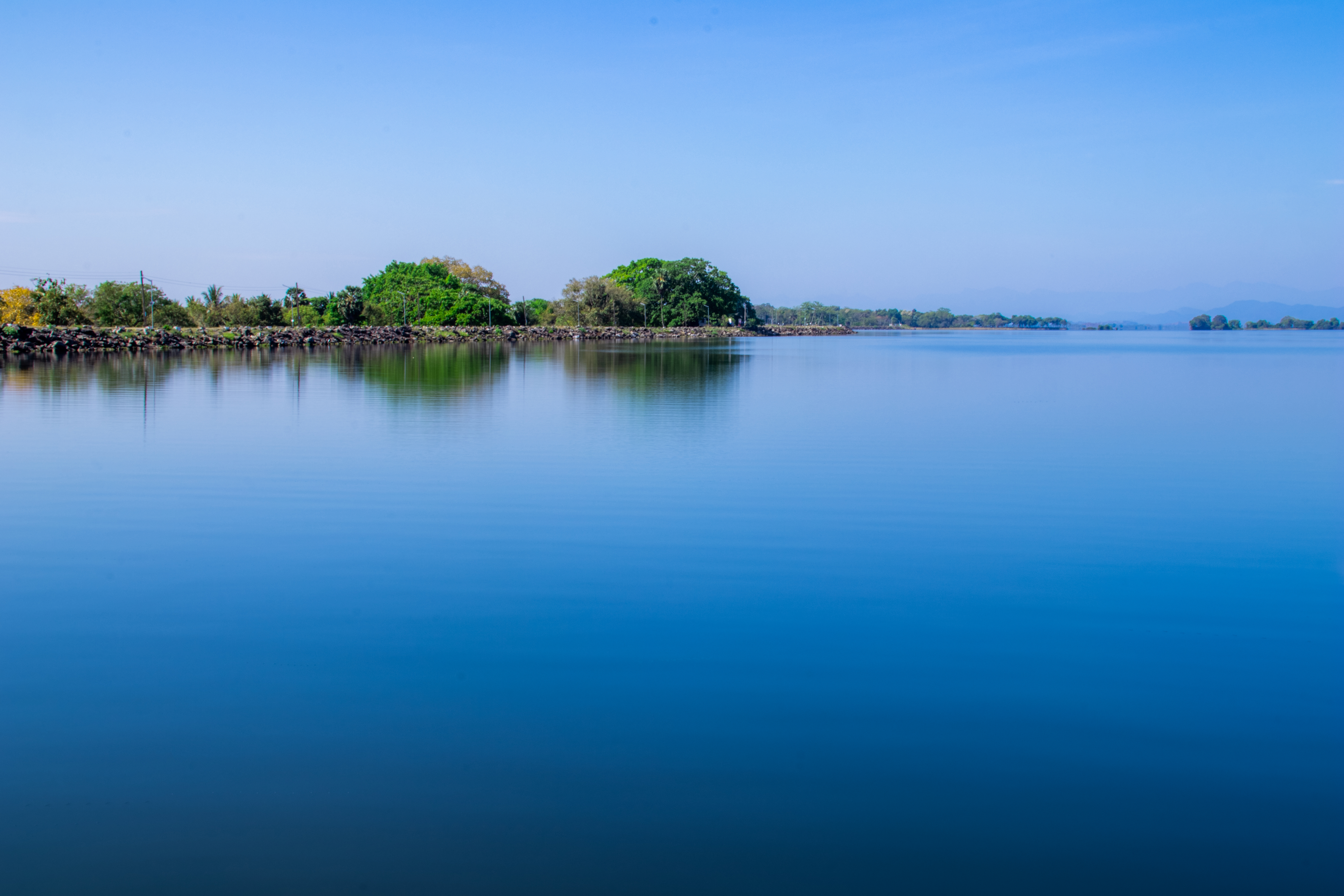
- Reflection of the sky in Parakrama Samudraya Evening at parakrama samudraya

- Location within Sri Lanka
- Location: Polonnaruwa
- Coordinates: 7°54′N 80°58′E
- Type: reservoir
- Catchment area: 75×10^{6} m^{2} (75 km^{2}; 29 sq mi)
- Basin countries: Sri Lanka
- Surface area: 22.6×10^{6} m^{2} (22.6 km^{2}; 8.7 sq mi)
- Average depth: 5 m (16 ft)
- Max. depth: 12.7 m (42 ft)
- Surface elevation: 58.5 m (192 ft)

Parakrama Samudra (or King Parakrama's sea or the Sea of King Parakrama) is a shallow reservoir (wewa), consisting of five separate wewa (reservoirs) (thopa, dumbutulu, erabadu, bhu, kalahagala tanks) connected by narrow channels in Polonnaruwa, Sri Lanka.

The northernmost reservoir is the oldest and referred to as Topa wewa (Sinhalese "wewa" is almost equal to English word lake or reservoir, but used unique Sri Lankan technology) built around 386 AD. The middle section Eramudu wewa and the southernmost portion, at the highest elevation, is Dumbutula wewa, both sections were added and the reservoir expanded during the reign of King Parâkramabâhu I. This wewa (reservoir) was built under the quote "do not let even a drop of rainwater in this country go to the sea without being made useful to man.". (in sinhala අහසින් වැටෙන එක් දිය බිඳක් හෝ මිනිසාගේ ප්‍රයෝජනයට නොගෙන මහ මුහුදට ගලා යාමට ඉඩ නොදිය යුතුයි ) The wewa (reservoir) was so large it was called Samudhraya, which means "the ocean".

== History ==
The Parakrama Samudra developed from a group of reservoirs constructed during different periods of Sri Lanka's ancient history. The northern section, known as Thopawewa, is believed to date back to the 4th century AD, while other sections were incorporated into the larger irrigation system during the reign of King Parakramabahu I (1153–1186).

Parakramabahu I expanded the existing water-storage system by connecting several reservoirs through canals, creating one of the largest irrigation works of the Polonnaruwa period. The project formed part of his wider program to improve agriculture and manage water resources across the kingdom. Water was brought from the Amban Ganga through the Angamadilla diversion system to supply the reservoir.

Following the decline of the Polonnaruwa Kingdom, the irrigation system gradually fell into disrepair. The reservoir was later identified and restored during the British colonial period and underwent major rehabilitation between 1937 and 1944. Further reconstruction during the 1950s altered parts of the original reservoir arrangement, including the separation of some of its former sections. Subsequent improvements to the spillway and irrigation structures increased its storage capacity and enabled the reservoir to continue serving the surrounding agricultural areas.

== Bathymetry and measurements ==
Parakrama Samudra is a relatively shallow reservoir with a surface area of approximately 22.6 km². Its average depth is about 5 meters, while the maximum recorded depth is approximately 12.7 meters. The reservoir has a reported water volume of 0.1273 km³ and a catchment area of approximately 73–75 km².

The reservoir's water level is regulated and normally fluctuates by around 4.4 meters over the course of the year, depending on rainfall, inflow, and irrigation releases. Its water storage area is formed by a system of interconnected basins, with the northern section occupying a lower elevation than the southern section.

The present dam is an earthfill embankment approximately 12.4 km long, with an average height of about 15 meters and a maximum height of 15.85 meters. The reservoir's full supply level is recorded at 59.43 meters above mean sea level, while its high flood level is 59.74 meters.

Physical and engineering measurements of Parakrama Samudra
Measurement	Recorded value
Surface area	22.6 km²
Mean depth	5.0 m
Maximum depth	12.7 m
Reported water volume	0.1273 km³
Catchment area	Approximately 73–75 km²
Annual water-level fluctuation	Approximately 4.4 m
Dam length	12.4 km
Average dam height	15 m
Maximum dam height	15.85 m
Full supply level	59.43 m MSL
High flood level	59.74 m MSL

== Engineering and reconstruction ==
The engineering system of Parakrama Samudra combines a large embankment, water diversion canals, sluices and spillways. Its feeder system includes the Angamadilla Yoda Ela, which diverts water from the Amban Ganga through a diversion structure at Angamadilla. The Theppan Ala canal connects the reservoir's component basins, allowing water to move between them.

The original irrigation system included several sluice structures used to regulate the release of stored water into irrigation channels. Remains of ancient sluices can still be found around the reservoir, including structures near Thopawewa and Bendiwewa. The Raja Bamma diversion structure at Angamadilla was reconstructed around 1939 as part of the modern restoration program.

Major rehabilitation work was carried out between 1937 and 1944, followed by further modifications during the 1950s. These works included changes to the reservoir's component sections and improvements to its storage and water-control structures. Modern spillway gates were subsequently installed to improve the regulation of water levels and flood releases.

In more recent times, the dam underwent further safety rehabilitation under the World Bank funded Dam Safety and Water Resources Planning Project. The work included strengthening the embankment, repairing its protective stone pitching (riprap), improving drainage at the downstream toe, and addressing seepage problems. Sluice and spillway gates were also repaired, while monitoring equipment, inspection access and safety facilities were introduced to support the long-term operation of the reservoir.

== Irrigation and other uses ==
The principal function of Parakrama Samudra is to provide irrigation water for agriculture in the surrounding areas of Polonnaruwa District. Water is diverted from the Amban Ganga through the Angamadilla diversion structure and conveyed to the reservoir through a feeder canal system. From the reservoir, water is distributed to agricultural land through sluices and irrigation canals. The irrigation scheme serves more than 10,100 hectares of farmland, with paddy cultivation being its main agricultural use. Water is supplied during the Maha and Yala cultivation seasons, with distribution managed according to reservoir storage, rainfall and agricultural requirements.

In addition to irrigation, the reservoir supports inland fisheries, including the production of food and ornamental fish. Its water resources also contribute to other local livelihoods, such as home gardening, cultivation of other field crops and animal husbandry. The reservoir and its surrounding environment also support wildlife habitats and nature-based tourism in the region.

== See also ==
- Polonnaruwa District
- Parakramabahu I in the (Polonnaruwa period) Kingdom of Polonnaruwa
- Polonnaruwa City
