= Kingdom of Tambapanni =

Sinhalese kingdom in present-day Sri Lanka (543-437 BC)

Kingdom of Tambapaṇṇī තම්බපණ්ණිය රාජධානිය (Sinhala) Tambapaṇṇī Rājadhāniya
- 543 BC–437 BC
- Kingdom of Tambapanni
- Capital: Tambapaṇṇī; Upatissagāma; Vijithapura
- Common languages: Elu
- Demonym: Sinhalese
- Government: Monarchy
- King
  - 543–505 BC: Vijaya
  - 505–504 BC: Upatissa
  - 504–474 BC: Panduvasdeva
  - 474–454 BC: Abhaya
  - 454–437 BC: Tissa
- Historical era: Pre Anuradhapura period
  - Indo-Aryan settlement: 543 BC
  - Consecration of Vijaya: 543 BC
  - Nineteen Years' War: 458–439 BC
  - Kingdom moved to Anuradhapura: 437 BC
Preceded by	Succeeded by
Naga people (Lanka); Yakkha people	Anuradhapura Kingdom

The Kingdom of Tambapaṇṇī (Sinhala: තම්බපණ්ණිය රාජධානිය, romanized: Tambapaṇṇī Rājadhāniya) was the first Sinhalese kingdom in Sri Lanka. Its administrative centre was based at Tambapaṇṇī. It existed between 543 BC and 437 BC. According to the Mahavamsa, the Kingdom was founded by Prince Vijaya and his followers.

== Name ==
Tambapaṇṇī is a name derived from Tāmraparṇī or Tāmravarṇī (in Sanskrit). This has got reference to the Thamirabarani river in Southern Tamil Nadu, India. This means the colour of copper or bronze because when Vijaya and his followers landed in Sri Lanka, when their hands and feet touched the ground they became red with the dust of the red-earth. Therefore, the city founded on that spot was named Tambapaṇṇī. A derivative of this name is Taprobane (Greek).

== Background ==
Ancient grave sites that were used before 600 BC and other signs of civilisation have also been discovered in Sri Lanka, but little is known about the history of the island before this time. According to the Mahāvamsa, a chronicle written in Pāḷi, the inhabitants of Sri Lanka prior to the Arya migration were the Yakkha (Sanskrit: यक्ष yakṣa; Pali: yakkha) and Nāga races.

Archaeological excavations including early Iron Age settlements at Anuradhapura and megalithic burial sites such as Ibbankatuwa indicate that organized, agrarian, and metal-working communities thrived across the island even before the 6th century BCE. Furthermore, historical records note that these indigenous Yakkha communities possessed established urban centers such as Sirivastu and Lankapura, structured governance, and domestic cotton-spinning industries prior to Vijaya's arrival. Modern historians emphasize that the Sinhalese people emerged through the cultural and genetic assimilation of these foundational indigenous Yakka and naga populations with early Indo-Aryans arrivals.The political history period of Sri Lanka traditionally starts in 543 BC with the arrival of Prince Vijaya.

Legend has it that when Prince Vijaya landed on the shores of the island he kissed the sand, called it 'Thambapanni' and planted a flag depicting a lion in the ground. (The famous 'Sanchi' ruins of India depict the events of Prince Vijaya'a landing). After landing in Tambapaṇṇī, Vijaya met Kuveni the queen of the Yakkhas, who was disguised as a beautiful woman but was really a yakkhini named Sesapathi.

== History ==
Prior to the 6th century BCE, northwestern and central Sri Lanka were governed by indigenous Yakkha rulers operating from established urban centers, notably their capital at Sirīsavatthu (believed to be near modern-day Anuradhapura or Ritikanda) and Lankapura. When Prince Vijaya and his 700 followers landed along the northwestern coast specifically near the mouth of the Malvathu Oya (Aruvi Aru) south of Mannar, though some traditions place it further south near Chilaw.He was able to establish a foothold only through a political marriage and alliance with the local Yakkha ruler Kuveni. Although later monastic chronicles such as the Mahāvaṃsa symbolically synchronized Vijaya's arrival with the Buddha's Parinibbāna (543 BCE) and framed him as the progenitor of the Sinhalese monarchy, modern historians and archaeologists emphasize that the Sinhalese people and their governance evolved over centuries from the assimilation of these pre-existing Yakkha and Nāga polities rather than originating from Vijaya's landing alone.

Upatissagāma was the second capital of the kingdom. It was seven or eight miles further north of the previous capital Tambapaṇṇī. The city was established by Upatissa, a follower and senior minister of Vijaya.

During the end of his reign Vijaya, who was having trouble choosing a successor, so sent a letter to the city of his ancestors at Sinhapura, in order to invite his brother Sumitta to take over the throne. However Vijaya had died before the letter had reached its destination so the monarchy was succeeded by his chief minister Upatissa who acted as king for a year.

== See also ==
- Pre Anuradhapura period
- List of Sri Lankan monarchs
