= Pre-Anuradhapura period =

Period in Sri Lankan history

Pre Anuradhapura period
- 543 BC – 437 BC
Prehistory of Sri Lanka	Anuradhapura period
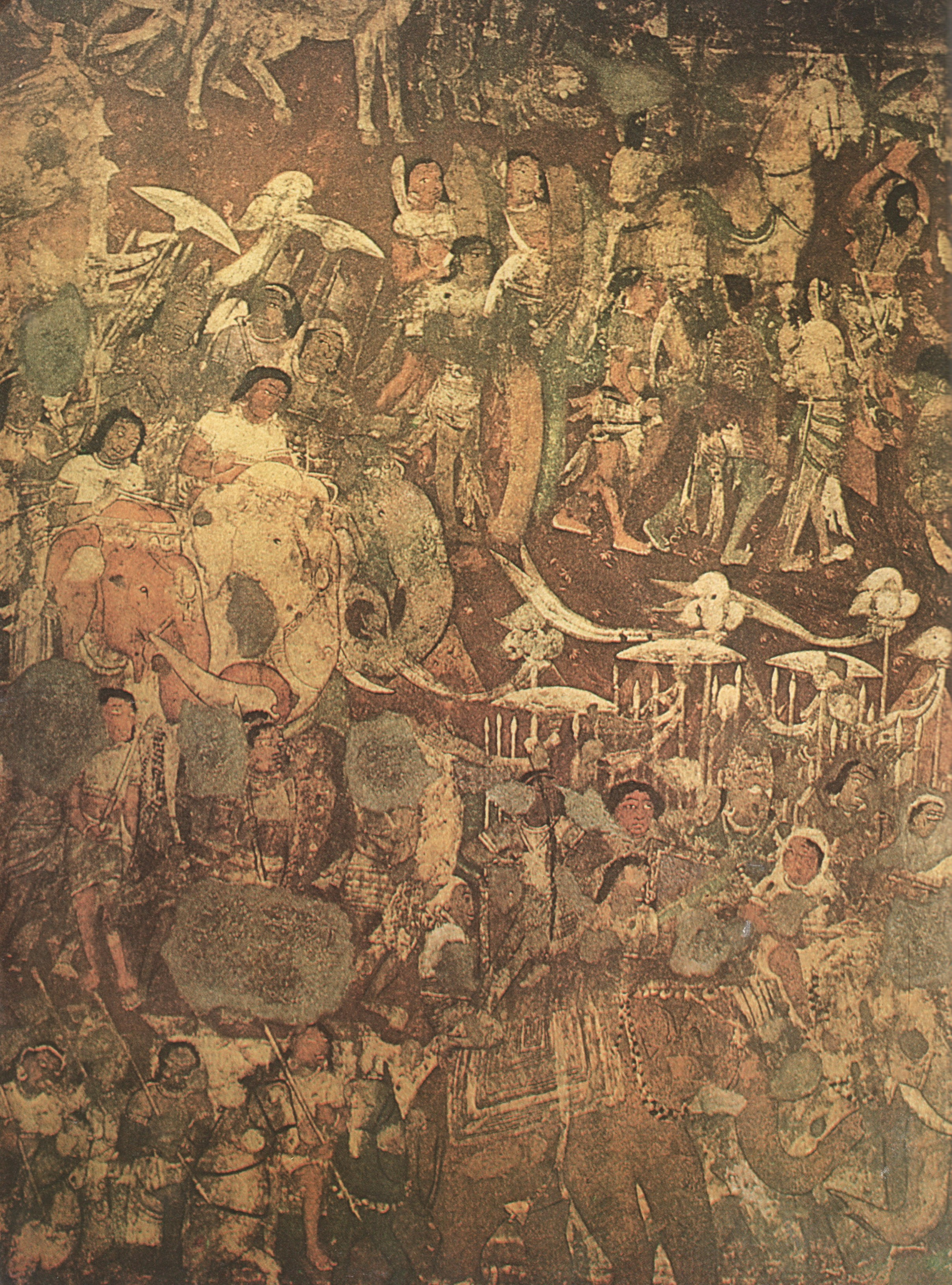
- A section of the mural from Ajanta Caves 17, depicting the "coming of Sinhala".
- Monarchs: House of Vijaya: Vijaya; Upatissa (regent); Panduvasdeva; Abhaya; Tissa (regent)

The Pre-Anuradhapura period of Sri Lankan history spans from the emergence of early Iron Age settlements radiocarbon-dated at Anuradhapura to at least 900–800 BCE until King Pandukabhaya unified the island's clans and established Anuradhapura as his royal capital in 377 BCE.

Before the 6th century BCE, indigenous Yaksha and Nāga clans governed established centers including Sirīsavatthu, Lankapura, and Kelaniya, practicing iron metallurgy, wet-rice agriculture, and tank irrigation. Following the 543 BCE landing of Prince Vijaya and his alliance with the Yakkha ruler Kuveni, the island's indigenous populations assimilated with early Indo-Aryan settlers to form the Sinhalese people. This integration culminated under Pandukabhaya, whose Yaksha heritage and co-governance with indigenous chieftains Cittaraja and Kalavela consolidated Anuradhapura as the island's permanent capital.

== Overview ==
Periodization of Sri Lanka's history:

Dates	Period	Period	Span (years)	Subperiod	Span (years)	Main government
300,000 BP	Prehistoric Sri Lanka	Stone Age	300,000		–	Unknown
~1000 BCE–543 BCE	Prehistoric Sri Lanka	Iron Age	457		–	Republic
543 BCE–437 BCE	Ancient Sri Lanka	Pre-Anuradhapura	106		–	Monarchy
437 BCE–463 CE	Ancient Sri Lanka	Anuradhapura	1454	Early Anuradhapura	900	Monarchy
463–691	Ancient Sri Lanka	Anuradhapura	1454	Middle Anuradhapura	228	Monarchy
691–1017	Post-classical Sri Lanka	Anuradhapura	1454	Late Anuradhapura	326	Monarchy
1017–1070	Post-classical Sri Lanka	Polonnaruwa	215	Chola conquest	53	Monarchy
1055–1196	Post-classical Sri Lanka	Polonnaruwa	215	High Polonnaruwa	141	Monarchy
1196–1232	Post-classical Sri Lanka	Polonnaruwa	215	Late Polonnaruwa	36	Monarchy
1232–1341	Post-classical Sri Lanka	Transitional	365	Dambadeniya	109	Monarchy
1341–1412	Post-classical Sri Lanka	Transitional	365	Gampola	71	Monarchy
1412–1592	Early Modern Sri Lanka	Transitional	365	Kotte	180	Monarchy
1592–1707	Early Modern Sri Lanka	Kandyan	223	Early Kandyan	115	Monarchy
1707–1760	Early Modern Sri Lanka	Kandyan	223	Middle Kandyan	53	Monarchy
1760–1815	Early Modern Sri Lanka	Kandyan	223	Late Kandyan	55	Monarchy
1815–1833	Modern Sri Lanka	British Ceylon	133	Post-Kandyan	18	Colonial monarchy
1833–1927	Modern Sri Lanka	British Ceylon	133	Colebrooke–Cameron Reforms era	94	Colonial monarchy
1927–1948	Modern Sri Lanka	British Ceylon	133	Donoughmore Reforms era	21	Colonial monarchy
1948–1972	Contemporary Sri Lanka	Sri Lanka since 1948	78	Dominion	24	Constitutional monarchy
1972–present	Contemporary Sri Lanka	Sri Lanka since 1948	78	Republic	54	Unitary semi-presidential constitutional republic

== Background ==
According to several sources, the Naga people were one of the groups that lived in coastal regions of Sri Lanka and before the arrival of Aryans in Lanka. Some recorded naga settlements in Sri Lanka were Kelaniya and the modern-day Jaffna Peninsula. One of the evidence that can be used to prove that point is the Jaffna Peninsula being called Nagadeepa in pali or Nakadiva in early Sinhala. The Naga people probably followed a set of beliefs unique to them just like other indigenous communities worldwide. We can speculate that part of their traditions included the veneration of serpents. And they may have started to follow the teachings in the Vedic scriptures and Buddhism (Probably non-denominational Buddhism that existed before the second buddhist council) after they came into contact with Aryans. They were later integrated into the dominant cultures of the areas where they lived, which were yakka culture and Deva culture.These are the Pre-Anuradapura Sinhala culture in Sri Lanka.

== Political History ==
The Kingdom of Tambapanni existed from 543 BC to 505 BC. According to Mahavamsa, the legendary Prince Vijaya and seven hundred of his followers came to Sri Lanka after being expelled from Sinhapura in India. Vijaya is said to have landed on the island on the day of Gautama Buddha's death, although it is suspected that the dates have coincided purposefully during writing. Before Parinirvana, the Buddha had asked the deities to protect the island because Buddhism will flourish and continue to exist in Sri Lanka. Prince Vijaya established the Kingdom of Tambapanni. He married a local Yakkhini named Kuveni, and their children gave rise to the Pulinda race (identified with the Vedda people). Vijaya also married a princess of the Pandu kingdom (identified with Pandyan kingdom) but did not have any children with her. His followers also married maidens sent by the Pandu king, and their descendants gave rise to the Sinhalese race.

== Historiography ==
The Pali chronicles, the Dipavamsa, Mahavamsa, Thupavamsa and the Culavamsa as well as a large collection of stone inscriptions, the Indian Epigraphical records, the Burmese versions of the chronicles etc., provide an exceptional record for the history of Sri Lanka from about the sixth century BC.

The Mahavamsa, written around 400 AD, using the Dipavamsa, the Attakatha and other written sources available, it correlates well with Indian histories of the period. Emperor Asoka's reign is recorded in the Mahavamsa. The Mahavamsa account of the period prior to Asoka's coronation, (218 years after the Buddha's death) seems to be part legend. The account of the Mahavamsa, a Pali text written largely from the Sinhalese perspective, has mythological beginnings but becomes historical from the third century BC, with the arrival of Buddhism under Devanampiya Tissa of Sri Lanka. Epigraphic sources also appear with the presence of Buddhism, from about the third century BC. The earliest historiographic literature, such as the Mahavamsa, dates to the sixth century AD. The entire ancient period of history written in the Mahavamsa is dominated by the Anuradhapura Kingdom. The medieval period in Sri Lanka is taken to begin with the fall of the Anuradhapura Kingdom in AD 1017.

=== Legacy ===
Within Sri Lanka, the legend of Vijaya is often treated as a factual account of a historical event. However, multiple scholars consider the legend of dubious historicity. Satchi Ponnambalam called it a "pure flight of fantasy". According to Gavin Thomas, the narration of historical events in Mahavamsa and its continuation Culavamsa is "at best questionably-biased, and at worst totally imaginary", aimed at establishing the royal lineage of the Sinhalese and the Buddhist credentials of the island. According to H.W. Codrington, Vijaya is probably a composite character, and the legend is aimed at connecting the early history of Sri Lanka with that of Buddha.

=== Indigenous Yaksha civilization and pre-Vijayan heritage ===
While traditional chronicles such as the Mahavamsa emphasize the arrival of Prince Vijaya in 543 BCE as a major political milestone, Sri Lankan historiography and archaeological findings indicate that an organized, advanced civilization existed on the island prior to the 6th century BCE. Ancient chronicles themselves describe that when Vijaya arrived, the indigenous Yaksha people including Queen Kuveni already maintained established cities such as Sirivastu and Lankapura, organized governance, iron metallurgy, and domestic cotton weaving industries.

Modern Sri Lankan historians and anthropologists note that the Sinhalese people emerged through the cultural and genetic assimilation of these indigenous island populations.The Yaksha, Naga, Deva, and Vedda clans with early Indo-Aryan settlers. In this historical perspective, Queen Kuveni and the indigenous Yaksha tribes represent foundational ancestors of Sri Lankan civilization rather than a secondary prelude to the Vijayan era.

== Monarchs ==
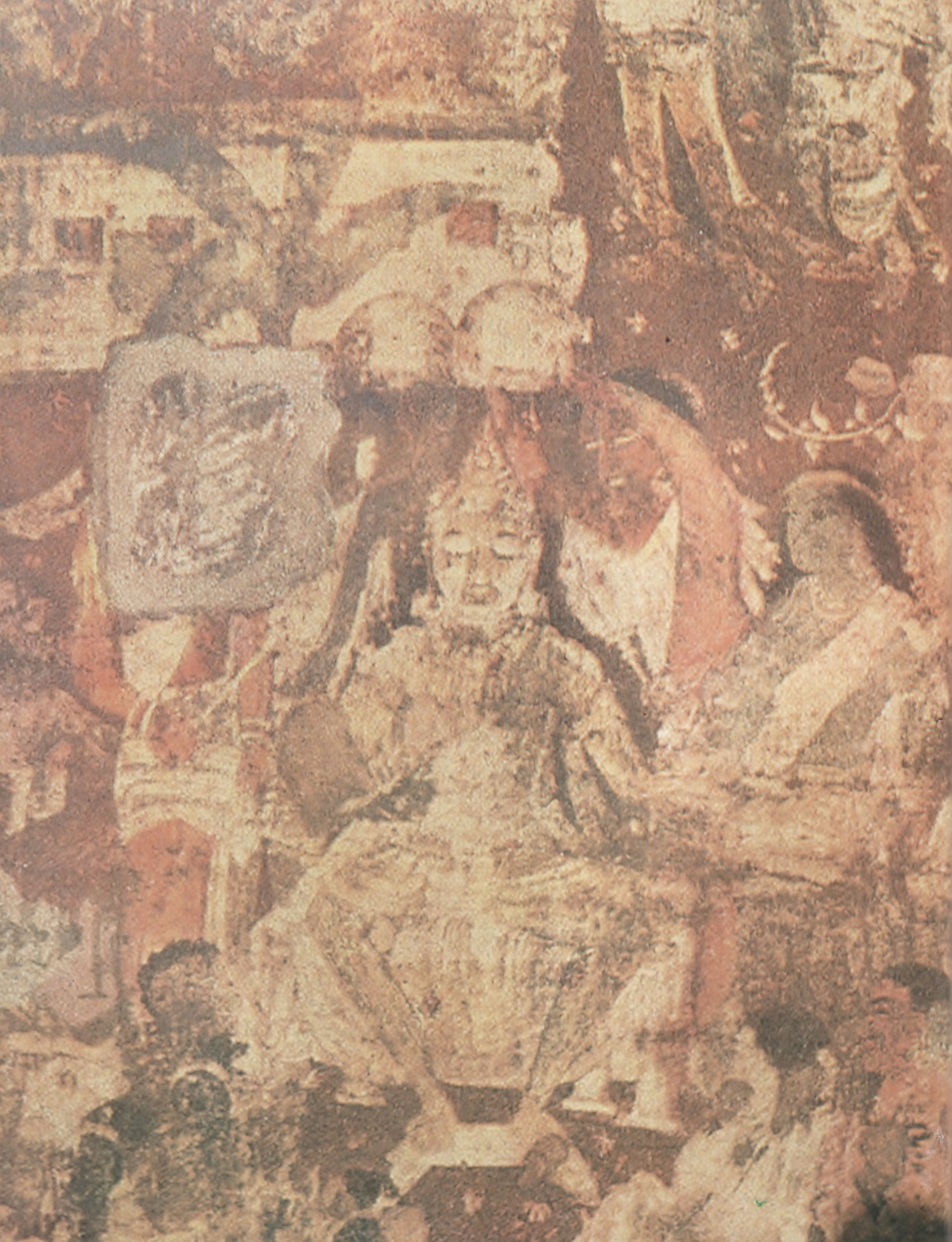
Prince Vijaya (543 BC–505 BC)

The House of Vijaya produced four monarchs and two regents who ruled during this period.

#	Name	Era	House	Reign		Duration
#	Name	Era	House	From	To	(years, months, days)
1	Vijaya	Tambapanni	Vijaya	543 BC	505 BC	38 Years
-	Upatissa	Tambapanni	Vijaya	505 BC	504 BC	1 Year
2	Panduvasdeva	Tambapanni	Vijaya	504 BC	474 BC	30 Years
3	Abhaya	Tambapanni	Vijaya	474 BC	454 BC	20 Years
-	Tissa	Tambapanni	Vijaya	454 BC	437 BC	17 Years

== Timeline ==
│
553 BC
│
543 BC
│
533 BC
│
523 BC
│
513 BC
│
503 BC
│
493 BC
│
483 BC
│
473 BC
│
463 BC
│
453 BC
│
443 BC
Pre Anuradhapura period

=== Events ===
- 543 BC: The Kingdom of Tambapanni is established by Prince Vijaya

== In popular culture ==
- Vijaya Kuweni, 2012 Sinhala epic biographical history film.

== See also ==
- Sinhala Kingdom
- List of Sinhalese monarchs

Preceded by Prehistoric Sri Lanka	Pre Anuradhapura period of Sri Lankan history 543 BC–377 BC	Succeeded by Anuradhapura period
