= Upatissa =

Upatissa is a Pali and Sinhala name. It may refer to:

- An alternate name for Sariputta, one of the chief male disciples of Gautama Buddha
  - Upatissagāma, his birthplace, near Rajgriha, in Magadha, India
- Upatissa (regent), chief minister and member of Prince Vijaya's followers, Sinhalese regent of the Kingdom of Tambapanni (505 BC–504 BC)
- Arahant Upatissa (Sri Lanka, 1st or 2nd century CE), the reputed author of the Vimuttimagga, an ancient Buddhist meditation manual
- Upatissa I of Anuradhapura, King of Anuradhapura (370–412)
- Upatissa II of Anuradhapura, King of Anuradhapura (525–526)
- Upatissa (monk) (Sri Lanka, 10th Century CE), reputed author of the Mahabodhivamsa
- Upatissa Gamanayake (1948–1989), former deputy leader of the Janatha Vimukthi Peramuna
- Upatissagāma, capital of the Kingdom of Tambapanni in Sri Lanka

== See also ==
- Tissa (disambiguation)
