= Prehistoric South Asia =

Prehistoric India may refer to any period in the history of South Asia predating the 3rd century BCE.

== By periods ==
- South Asian Stone Age
- South Asian Bronze Age
- South Asian Iron Age
  - Vedic period
  - Mahajanapadas

== By regions ==
- Prehistoric Sri Lanka

== See also ==
- Ancient India
- History of India § Prehistoric era (until c. 3300 BCE)
- History of Pakistan § Prehistory
- History of South Asia
- Prehistoric Asia
