= Tissa =

Tissa may refer to:

== People ==
- Devanampiya Tissa of Anuradhapura, King of Anuradhapura
- Prince Tissa, Sinhalese regent of the Kingdom of Tambapanni (454 BC–437 BC)
- Vitashoka, the brother of Ashoka, called Tissa in the Southern Buddhist tradition
- Tissa (prince), viceroy of Vientiane, took part in Lao rebellion (1826–1828)
- Tissa Balasuriya (1924–2013), Sri Lankan Roman Catholic priest and theologian
- Tissa Vitharana (1934–2026), Sri Lankan physician and politician
- Tissa Wijeyeratne (1923–2002), former Sri Lankan barrister, diplomat and businessman

== Places ==
- Tissa, Germany, municipality in Thuringia, Germany
- Tissa, Cameroon, settlement of the Bata people in North Region (Cameroon)
- Tisza, tributary of the Danube
- Tissa, India, village in the Muzaffarnagar district of Uttar Pradesh, and one of the twelve villages comprising the Saadat-e-Bara
- Tissa, Morocco

== See also ==
- Upatissa (disambiguation)
- Hermits Tissa and Thiha, Burmese Buddhist monks
