= Tamraparni =

Sanskrit term for various ancient places

Tamraparni (Tamil / Sanskrit for "with copper leaves" or "red-leaved") is an older name for multiple distinct places, including Sri Lanka, Tirunelveli in India, and the Thamirabarani River that flows through Tirunelveli in Tamil Nadu.

== As a name for Sri Lanka ==
The rock edicts of the 3rd century BCE Indian emperor Ashoka mention the word Tamraparni (as "Tambapanni") in connection with his foreign missions. One edict states that his dhamma vijaya (victory through dhamma) prevailed in frontier kingdoms of the Choda (Cholas), Pada (Pandyas), and as far as Tambapanni. This seems to be a reference to Sri Lanka, as the Buddhist chronicles of Sri Lanka mention that a port city called Tammapanni was established there during the reign of the legendary king Vijaya. The city was called "Tammena" during the reign of Vijaya's successor Panduvasdeva and "Tammapanni" during the reign of Ashoka's missionary son Mahendra. According to these chronicles, the place was so called because its dust stuck to Mahendra's skin, making him appear copper-coloured. The name was subsequently applied to the entire island of Sri Lanka.

According to one theory, "Taprobane", an ancient Greek name for Sri Lanka, is derived from the word "Tamraparni". The name may be a reference to the "copper colored" shores of Sri Lanka, and may have entered Greek via the Pali "Tambapanni". Megasthenes, a Greek ambassador to Ashoka's grandfather Chandragupta, describes Taprobane as being separated from the mainland by a river, and as being "more productive of gold and large pearls than India." This seems to be a reference to Sri Lanka. In the world map drawn by the ancient Greek (Ptolemy's Geographia, 150 CE), a huge island located south of the Indian subcontinent is referred to by the Greek as "Taprobane", which modern historians identify as the island of Sri Lanka.

== As a name for the river ==
The name "Tamraparni" was applied to Tirunelveli and the river flowing through it relatively later, after having been used as a name for Sri Lanka. Historian R. Champakalakshmi theorizes that the Sanskrit word "Tamraparni" and Prakrit word "Tambapanni" are renderings of the Tamil language words "Tan porunai". According to this theory, the Thamirabarani River was originally known as "Tan Porunai" (literally "cool toddy"). This name of the river occurs in Ettuthokai, the ancient Tamil anthologies.
