= Transitional period of Sri Lanka =

Period of Sri Lankan history from 1232 to 1597

The Transitional period of Sri Lanka spans from the end of the Kingdom of Polonnaruwa, in 1232, to the start of the Kandyan period in 1597. The period is characterised by the succession of capitals that followed the fall of the Polonnaruwa Kingdom and the creation of the Jaffna kingdom and Crisis of the Sixteenth Century.

== Overview ==
Periodization of Sri Lanka history:

Dates	Period	Period	Span (years)	Subperiod	Span (years)	Main government
300,000 BP	Prehistoric Sri Lanka	Stone Age	300,000		–	Unknown
~1000 BCE–543 BCE	Prehistoric Sri Lanka	Iron Age	457		–	Republic
543 BCE–437 BCE	Ancient Sri Lanka	Pre-Anuradhapura	106		–	Monarchy
437 BCE–463 AD	Ancient Sri Lanka	Anuradhapura	1454	Early Anuradhapura	900	Monarchy
463–691	Ancient Sri Lanka	Anuradhapura	1454	Middle Anuradhapura	228	Monarchy
691–1017	Post-classical Sri Lanka	Anuradhapura	1454	Late Anuradhapura	326	Monarchy
1017–1070	Post-classical Sri Lanka	Polonnaruwa	215	Chola conquest	53	Monarchy
1055–1196	Post-classical Sri Lanka	Polonnaruwa	215	High Polonnaruwa	141	Monarchy
1196–1232	Post-classical Sri Lanka	Polonnaruwa	215	Late Polonnaruwa	36	Monarchy
1232–1341	Post-classical Sri Lanka	Transitional	365	Dambadeniya	109	Monarchy
1341–1412	Post-classical Sri Lanka	Transitional	365	Gampola	71	Monarchy
1412–1592	Early Modern Sri Lanka	Transitional	365	Kotte	180	Monarchy
1592–1707	Early Modern Sri Lanka	Kandyan	223	Early Kandyan	115	Monarchy
1707–1760	Early Modern Sri Lanka	Kandyan	223	Middle Kandyan	53	Monarchy
1760–1815	Early Modern Sri Lanka	Kandyan	223	Late Kandyan	55	Monarchy
1815–1833	Modern Sri Lanka	British Ceylon	133	Post-Kandyan	18	Colonial monarchy
1833–1927	Modern Sri Lanka	British Ceylon	133	Colebrooke–Cameron Reforms era	94	Colonial monarchy
1927–1948	Modern Sri Lanka	British Ceylon	133	Donoughmore Reforms era	21	Colonial monarchy
1948–1972	Contemporary Sri Lanka	Sri Lanka since 1948	78	Dominion	24	Constitutional monarchy
1972–present	Contemporary Sri Lanka	Sri Lanka since 1948	78	Republic	54	Unitary semi-presidential constitutional republic

== Political history ==
=== Dambadeniya period (1232–1341) ===
Dambadeniya is an ancient capital of Sri Lanka. Four kings ruled from there, Vijayabâhu III (1220–1236), Parâkkamabâhu II (1236–1270), Vijayabâhu IV (1270–1272), and Bhuvanaikabâhu I (1272–1283). The first king to choose Dambadeniya as his capital was Vijayabâhu III. He was able to bring about unity among the sangha who had scattered due to the hostile invasion of the Kalinga magha. He also succeeded in holding a Buddhist convention in 1226 to bring about peace among the Buddhist clergy. Parâkkamabâhu II inherited the throne from Vijayabâhu III. He was considered a genius who was a great poet and prolific writer. Among the books he wrote are Kausilumina, which is considered a great piece of literature. Unifying the three kingdoms that existed within Sri Lanka at that point in time is regarded as his greatest achievement.

Vijayabâhu, as the eldest son of Parâkkamabâhu II, was crowned in 1270. He was well known for his modest behaviour and for his religious activities. He was killed in the second year of his reign by a minister called Miththa. After the demise of his elder brother Vijayabâhu, king Bhuvanaikabâhu I, as the next in line to the throne, shifted the capital to Yapahuwa for reasons of security. He followed his father's footsteps as a writer and continued with the religious activities started by his brother Vijayabâhu.

=== Jaffna Kingdom (1215–1624) ===
The Jaffna kingdom came into existence after the invasion of Magha, who is said to have been from Kalinga, in South India. It was a tribute-paying feudatory region of the Pandyan Empire in modern South India in 1250, but it later became independent with the fragmentation of the Pandyan control. For a brief period, in the early and middle 14th century, it was an ascendant power in the island of Sri Lanka when all regional kingdoms accepted subordination. However, the Jaffna kingdom came under the rule of the south on one occasion; in 1450, following the conquest by Parâkramabâhu VI's adopted son, Prince Sapumal. He ruled the North from 1450 to 1467. It was freed of Kotte control in 1467. Its subsequent rulers directed their energies towards consolidating its economic potential by maximising revenue from pearls and elephant exports and land revenue. It was less feudal than most of other regional kingdoms in the island of the same period. During this period, important local Tamil literature was produced and Hindu temples were built, including an academy for language advancement.

=== Gampola period (1341–1412) ===
The capital was moved to Gampola by Buwanekabahu IV, he is said to be the son of Sawulu Vijayabāhu. During this time, a muslim traveller and geographer named Ibn Battuta came to Sri Lanka and wrote a book about it. The Gadaladeniya Viharaya is the main building made in the Gampola Kingdom period. The Lankatilaka Viharaya is also a main building built in Gampola.

Chinese admiral Zheng He and his naval expeditionary force landed at Galle, Sri Lanka in 1409 and got into battle with the local king Vira Alakesvara of Gampola. Zheng He captured King Vira Alakesvara and later released him. Zheng He erected the Galle Trilingual Inscription, a stone tablet at Galle written in three languages (Chinese, Tamil, and Persian), to commemorate his visit.

=== Kotte period (1412–1597) ===
By the sixteenth century the population of the island was approximately 750,000, the majority, 400-450 thousand lived in the Kingdom of Kotte which was the largest and most powerful polity on the island. Its boundaries reached from the Malvatu Oya in the North to the Valave River in the South, and from the central highlands to the western coast. The Kotte kings regarded themselves as Chakravartis (Emperors), laying claim to the whole island, after Parakramabahu VI, but actual power was limited to within their own boundaries. Despite areas under its direct jurisdiction changing from time to time, Kotte held the island's lands where trade and agriculture were most developed. The Kotte kings were the largest land owners in the country, with much of the royal income coming from land revenue as opposed to trade. The Gabadāgam (Royal lands) accounted for more than three quarter of the annual royal income, and monetization of the economy in the littoral region began at least as far back as the fifteenth century.

During this time the Portuguese entered into the internal politics of Sri Lanka. Largely by accident, first contact between the two nations was in 1505-06. But it was not until 1517-18 that the Portuguese sought to establish a fortified trading settlement in order to establish control over the island's Cinnamon trade, as opposed to territorial conquest. The building of a fort, near Colombo, had to be given up due popular hostility that was fanned by Moorish traders, who had established themselves on the island and controlled a large portion of its external trade. The Portuguese at no stage established dominance over the politics of South Asia, but sought to do so over its commerce by means of subjugation through naval power. Using their superior technology and sea power at points of weakness or divisions, the Portuguese would attain influence in greater proportions to their actual strength. Portuguese anxiety to establish a Bridgehead in Sri Lanka to control the island's Cinnamon trade drew them further into the politics of Sri Lanka.

Kotte suffered from persistent succession disputes during this time. Though all were subordinate to the emperor of Kotte, brothers of the king would take the title Raja (king) and rule parts of the kingdom. This practice was possibly tolerated to humour princes who had some claim to the throne by giving them positions of responsibility, and the belief that having loyal relatives in outlying districts afforded some security to the king. However this political structure inevitably led to its own weakening in the long run, as those princes, who could, virtually administered the areas they claimed as autonomous principalities.

==== Crisis of the Sixteenth Century (1521–1597) ====
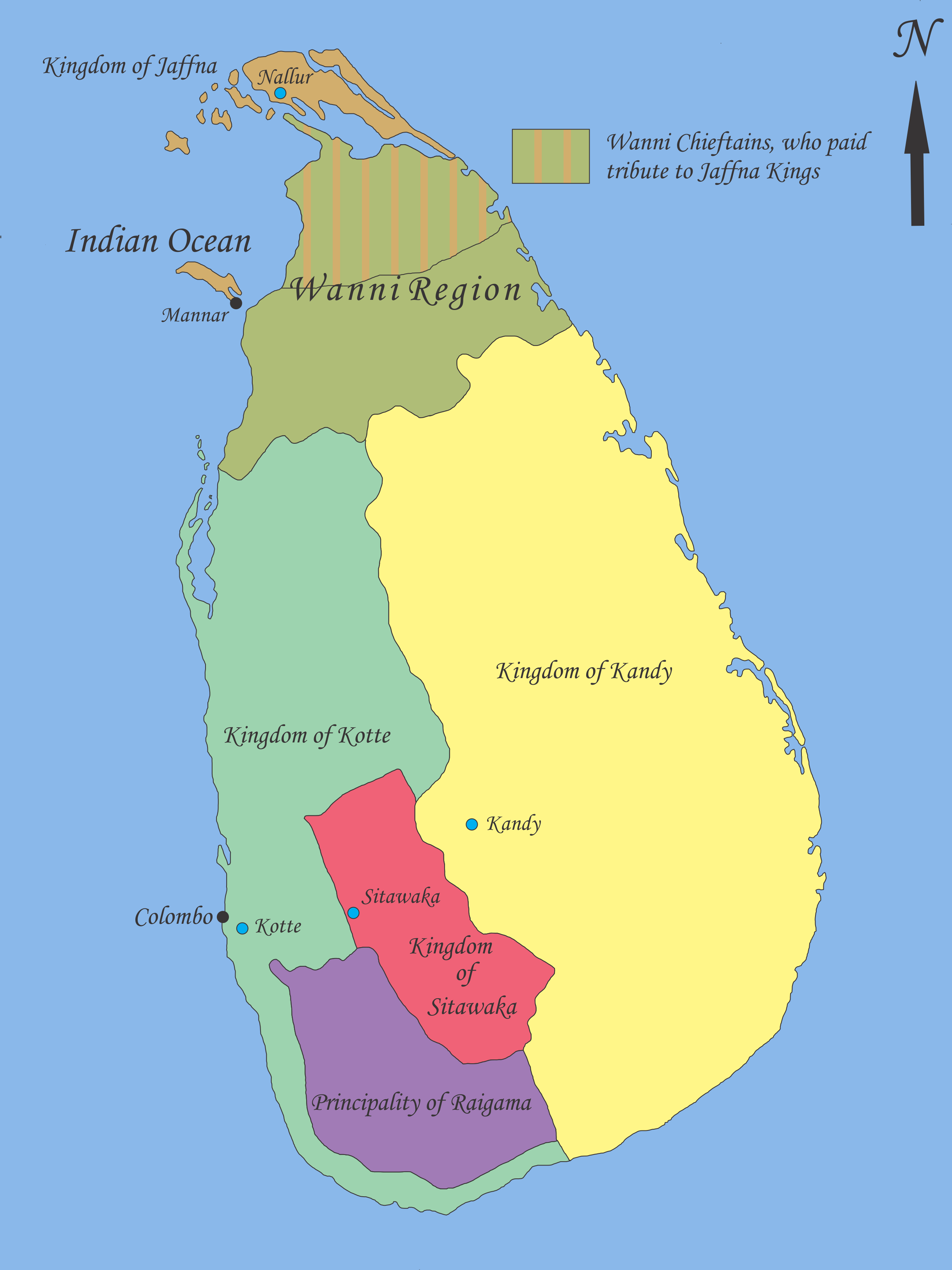
Sri Lanka after Vijayabā Kollaya in 1521

In 1521 the Vijayabā Kollaya was one such and the most eventful of succession disputes in the kingdom and would trigger the most chaotic period in the history of Sri Lanka. Vijayabāhu VI, who had four sons by two wives, sought to select his youngest son for the succession of the kingdom. In reaction the three older brothers assassinated their father, with the assistance of the Kandyan ruler, and divided the kingdom among themselves. With this partition the fragmentation of the Sri Lankan polity seemed well beyond the capacity of any statesman to repair. The Kandyan ruler took advantage of the situation in a cynical and shrewd move to aggravate the political instability as an opportunity to assert their independence from the control of Kotte. Kanday ruler Jayavira Bandara (1511–52) readily aided the three princes against their father, and it was clear the decline of the Kingdom of Kotte was necessary for the rise of the Kingdom of Kandy.

== See also ==
- Mahavamsa
- Sinhala Kingdom
- List of Sinhalese monarchs
