= Kandyan period =

Period of Sri Lankan history from 1597 to 1815

The Kandyan period covers the history of Sri Lanka from 1597–1815. After the fall of the Kingdom of Kotte, the Kandyan Kingdom was the last independent monarchy of Sri Lanka. The Kingdom played a major role throughout the history of Sri Lanka. It was founded in 1476. The kingdom located in the central part of Sri Lanka managed to remain independent from both the Portuguese and Dutch rule who controlled coastal parts of Sri Lanka; however, it was colonised by the British in 1815. The Kingdom of Kandy was the last independent monarchy of Sri Lanka.

== Overview ==
Periodization of Sri Lanka history:

Dates	Period	Period	Span (years)	Subperiod	Span (years)	Main government
300,000 BP	Prehistoric Sri Lanka	Stone Age	300,000		–	Unknown
~1000 BCE–543 BCE	Prehistoric Sri Lanka	Iron Age	457		–	Republic
543 BCE–437 BCE	Ancient Sri Lanka	Pre-Anuradhapura	106		–	Monarchy
437 BCE–463 CE	Ancient Sri Lanka	Anuradhapura	1454	Early Anuradhapura	900	Monarchy
463–691	Ancient Sri Lanka	Anuradhapura	1454	Middle Anuradhapura	228	Monarchy
691–1017	Post-classical Sri Lanka	Anuradhapura	1454	Late Anuradhapura	326	Monarchy
1017–1070	Post-classical Sri Lanka	Polonnaruwa	215	Chola conquest	53	Monarchy
1055–1196	Post-classical Sri Lanka	Polonnaruwa	215	High Polonnaruwa	141	Monarchy
1196–1232	Post-classical Sri Lanka	Polonnaruwa	215	Late Polonnaruwa	36	Monarchy
1232–1341	Post-classical Sri Lanka	Transitional	365	Dambadeniya	109	Monarchy
1341–1412	Post-classical Sri Lanka	Transitional	365	Gampola	71	Monarchy
1412–1592	Early Modern Sri Lanka	Transitional	365	Kotte	180	Monarchy
1592–1707	Early Modern Sri Lanka	Kandyan	223	Early Kandyan	115	Monarchy
1707–1760	Early Modern Sri Lanka	Kandyan	223	Middle Kandyan	53	Monarchy
1760–1815	Early Modern Sri Lanka	Kandyan	223	Late Kandyan	55	Monarchy
1815–1833	Modern Sri Lanka	British Ceylon	133	Post-Kandyan	18	Colonial monarchy
1833–1927	Modern Sri Lanka	British Ceylon	133	Colebrooke–Cameron Reforms era	94	Colonial monarchy
1927–1948	Modern Sri Lanka	British Ceylon	133	Donoughmore Reforms era	21	Colonial monarchy
1948–1972	Contemporary Sri Lanka	Sri Lanka since 1948	78	Dominion	24	Constitutional monarchy
1972–present	Contemporary Sri Lanka	Sri Lanka since 1948	78	Republic	54	Unitary semi-presidential constitutional republic

== Background ==
Senasammata Vikramabahu ruled the Kingdom of Kandy as a semi-independent kingdom under the Kingdom of Kotte, Vikramabahu founded the city of Kandy making it the new capital of the Kandyan Kingdom. After 1476 the kingdom became a separate entity seceding from Kotte. Vikramabahu was succeeded by his son Jayaweera Astana (1511–1551) and then by Karaliyadde Bandara (1551–1581) who was succeeded by his daughter Dona Catherina (1581–1581). Dona Catherina was succeeded by Rajasinha (I) aka Tikiri Bandara (1581–1591) he was succeeded by Vimala Dharma Suriya (I) aka Konappu Bandara and his baptismal name Don Joao of Austria (1591–1604) and he was succeeded by his first cousin Senarat (1604–1635).

== Political history ==
=== Early Kandyan period (1592–1707) ===
In 1595, Vimaladharmasurya brought the sacred Tooth Relic, the traditional symbol of royal and religious authority amongst the Sinhalese, to Kandy, and built the Temple of the Tooth. In spite of on-going intermittent warfare with Europeans, the kingdom survived. Later, a crisis of succession emerged in Kandy upon king Vira Narendrasinha's death in 1739. He was married to a Telugu-speaking Nayakkar princess from South India (Madurai) and was childless by her.

When the Dutch captain Joris van Spilbergen landed in 1602, the king of Kandy appealed to him for help.

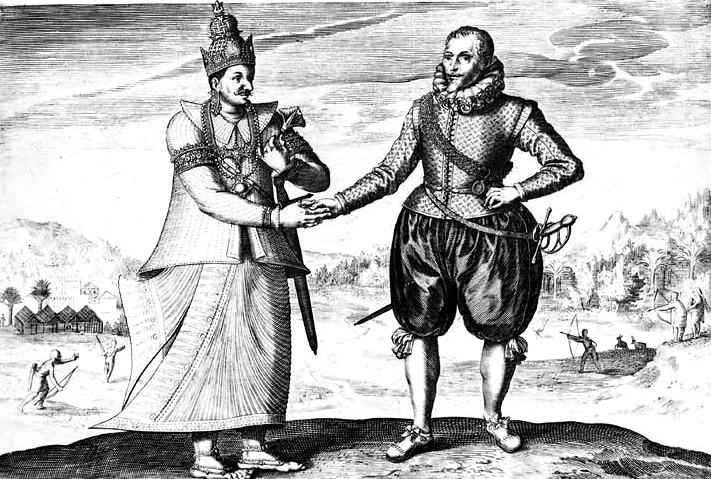
A 17th-century engraving of Dutch explorer Joris van Spilbergen meeting with King Vimaladharmasuriya in 1602

In 1619, succumbing to attacks by the Portuguese, the independent existence of Jaffna kingdom came to an end.

Rajasinha II

Rajasinha II was the son of Senarat and Empress Dona Catherina. He ruled from 1629 to 6 December 1687. It was during his time the Battle of Gannoruwa took place. The Portuguese forces who attempted to invade the Kandyan Kingdom were defeated at the city of Gannoruwa.900 Portuguese soldiers came to attack and only 33 were soldiers were alive after the battle. After the death of his son Vimala Dharma Suriya (II) took over. Vimala Dharma Suriya married a princess from Madurai, Tamil Nadu. After Vimala Dharma Suriya's (II) death his seventeen years old son ascended the throne. Vira Narendra Sinha of Kandy reigned from (1707–1739). In his reign, the Kandy Maha Dewale was founded in 1731.His wife was a Madurai Nayak Dynasty princess from southern India. Since he had no children of his own he was succeeded by his wife's brother, Sri Vijaya Rajasinha, who was of Nayakkar nationality which originated from south India. After that the throne of the Sinhalese kings passed to the Nayakkars till the history of Sri Lankan monarchies ended.

During the reign of the Rajasinghe II, Dutch explorers arrived on the island. In 1638, the king signed a treaty with the Dutch East India Company to get rid of the Portuguese who ruled most of the coastal areas. The main conditions of the treaty were that the Dutch were to hand over the coastal areas they had captured to the Kandyan king in return for a Dutch monopoly over the cinnamon trade on the island. The following Dutch–Portuguese War resulted in a Dutch victory, with Colombo falling into Dutch hands by 1656. The Dutch remained in the areas they had captured, thereby violating the treaty they had signed in 1638. By 1660 they controlled the whole island except the land-locked kingdom of Kandy. The Dutch (Protestants) persecuted the Catholics and the remaining Portuguese settlers but left Buddhists, Hindus and Muslims alone. The Dutch levied far heavier taxes on the people than the Portuguese had done. An ethnic group named Burgher people emerged in Sri Lankan society as a result of Dutch rule.

=== Middle Kandyan period (1707–1760) ===
Eventually, with the support of bhikku Weliwita Sarankara, the crown passed to the brother of one of Narendrasinha's princesses, overlooking the right of "Unambuwe Bandara", Narendrasinha's own son by a Sinhalese concubine. The new king was crowned Sri Vijaya Rajasinha later that year. Kings of the Nayakkar dynasty launched several attacks on Dutch controlled areas, which proved to be unsuccessful.

Kirti Sri Rajasinha

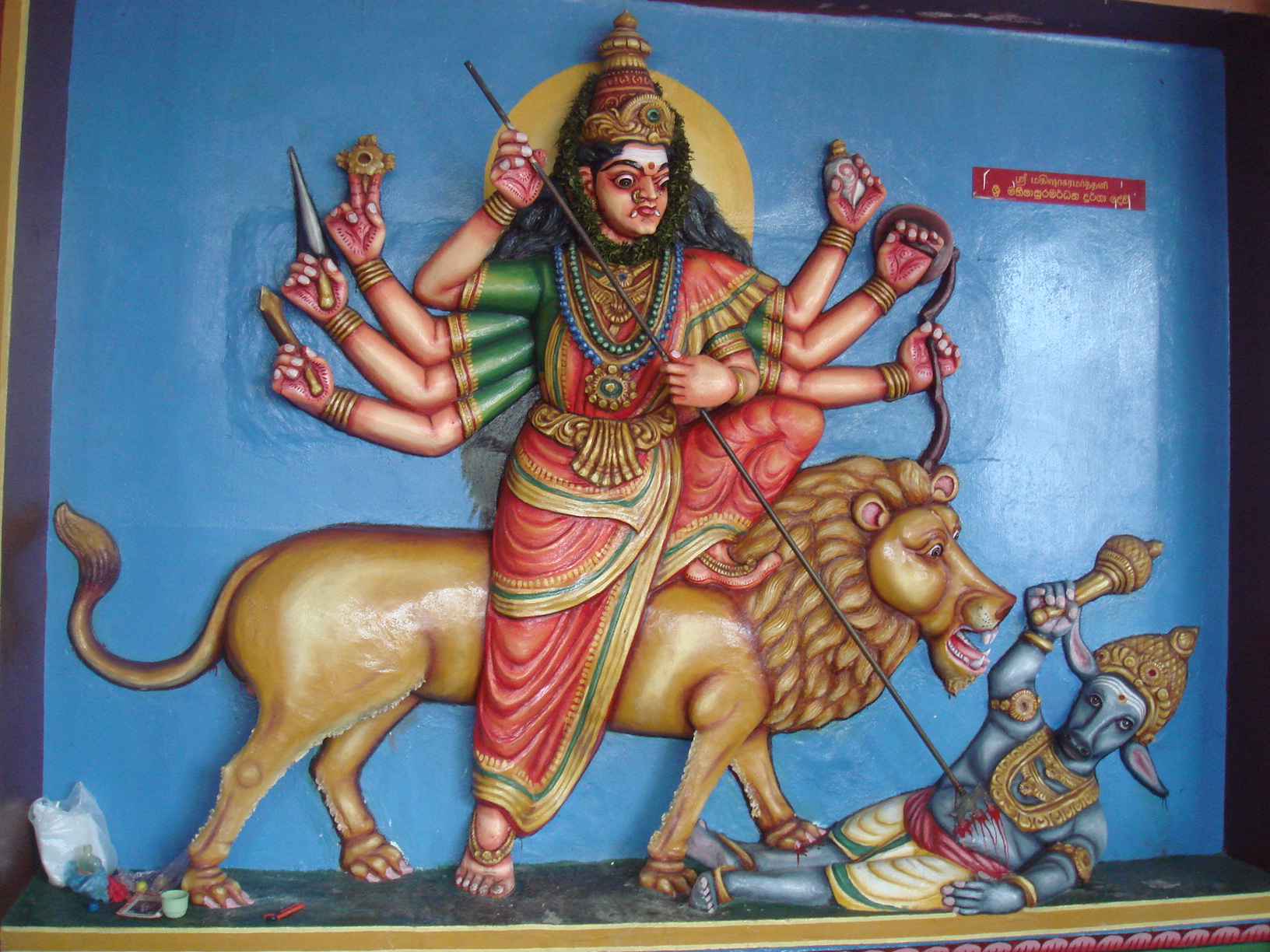
Munneswaram temple, rebuilt by Kirthi Sri Rajasinha

Kirti Sri Raja Singha was the second Nayaka king of Kandy. The is credited for the revival of Buddhism and literature in Sri Lanka. Under the guidance and influence of Weliwita Sri Saranankara Thero, with the Dutch assistance, Kirti Sri Raja Singha successfully invited Bhikkus from Siam (Thailand) to revive the higher ordination of Buddhist monks in Sri Lanka. He also built the existing inner temple of the Sacred Tooth Relic and Raja Maha Vihara (Gangarama) in Kandy. During his reign the Mahavamsa chronicle was continued from the time of Parakramabahu IV of Dambadeniya. He also rebuilt the Munneswaram temple close to Chilaw.

=== Late Kandyan period (1760–1815) ===
Sri Rajadhi Rajasinha

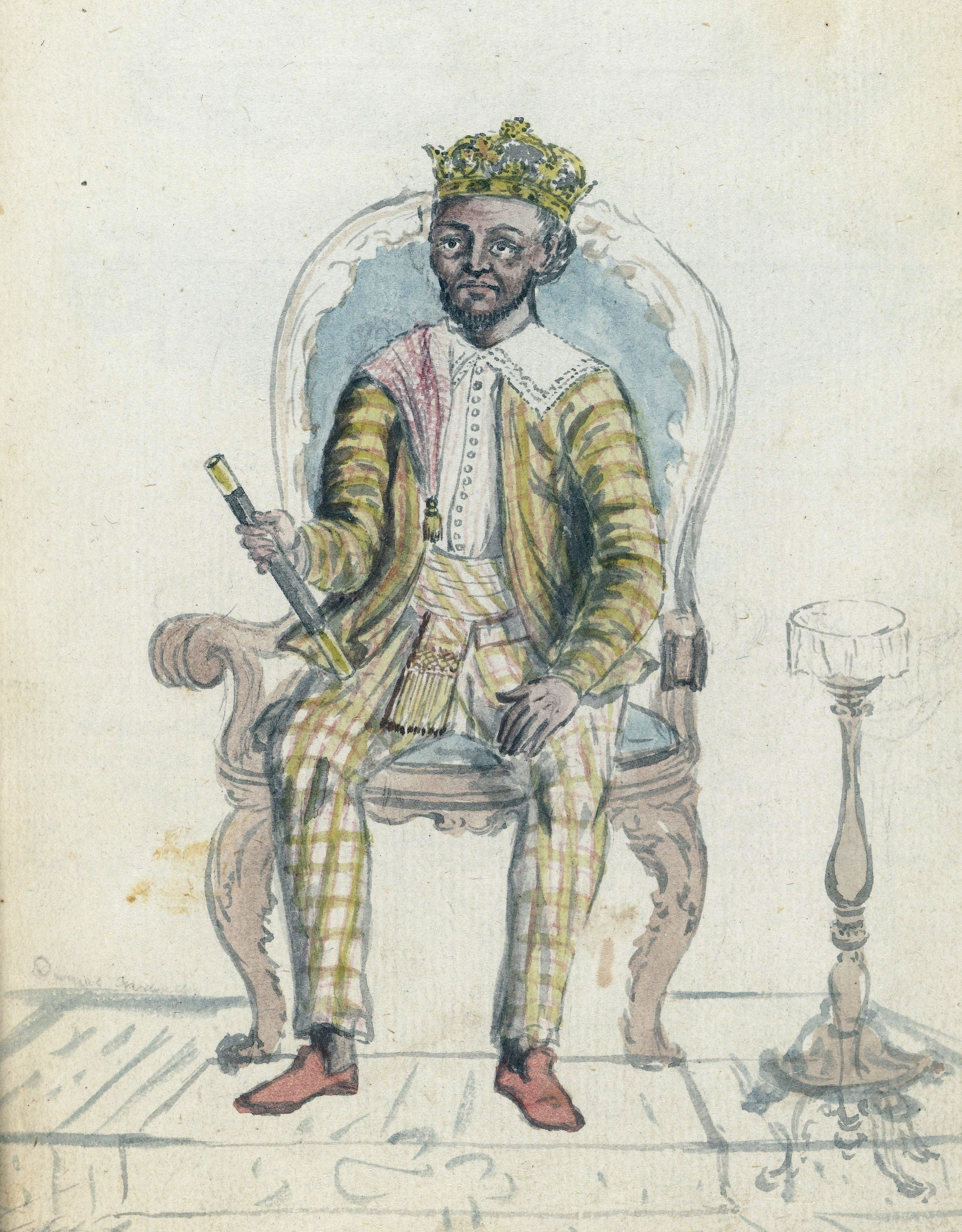
Sri Rajadhi Rajasinha

Sri Rajadhi Rajasinha (reigned 1782–1798) was a member of the Madurai royal family and succeeded his brother, Kirti Sri Rajasinha as of Kandy in 1782. Sri Rajadhi Raja Sinha was fluent in many languages including Pali and Sanskrit. His nephew Prince Kannasamy succeeded him. Prince Kannasamy was only 18 when he took over the throne.

Sri Vickrama Rajasinha

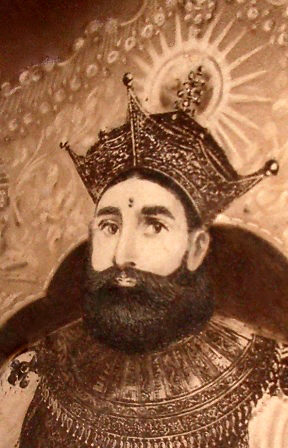
Sri Vikrama Rajasinha of Kandy, the last ruling Sinhalese monarch

Sri Vikrama Rajasinha was the last monarch to rule Sri Lanka. After he was captured by the British in 1815 it ended the history of Sri Lankan self governed monarchical rule. During his reign, he completed the Dalada Maligawa Temple by building the Paththirippuwa. He also built the Kandy Lake.

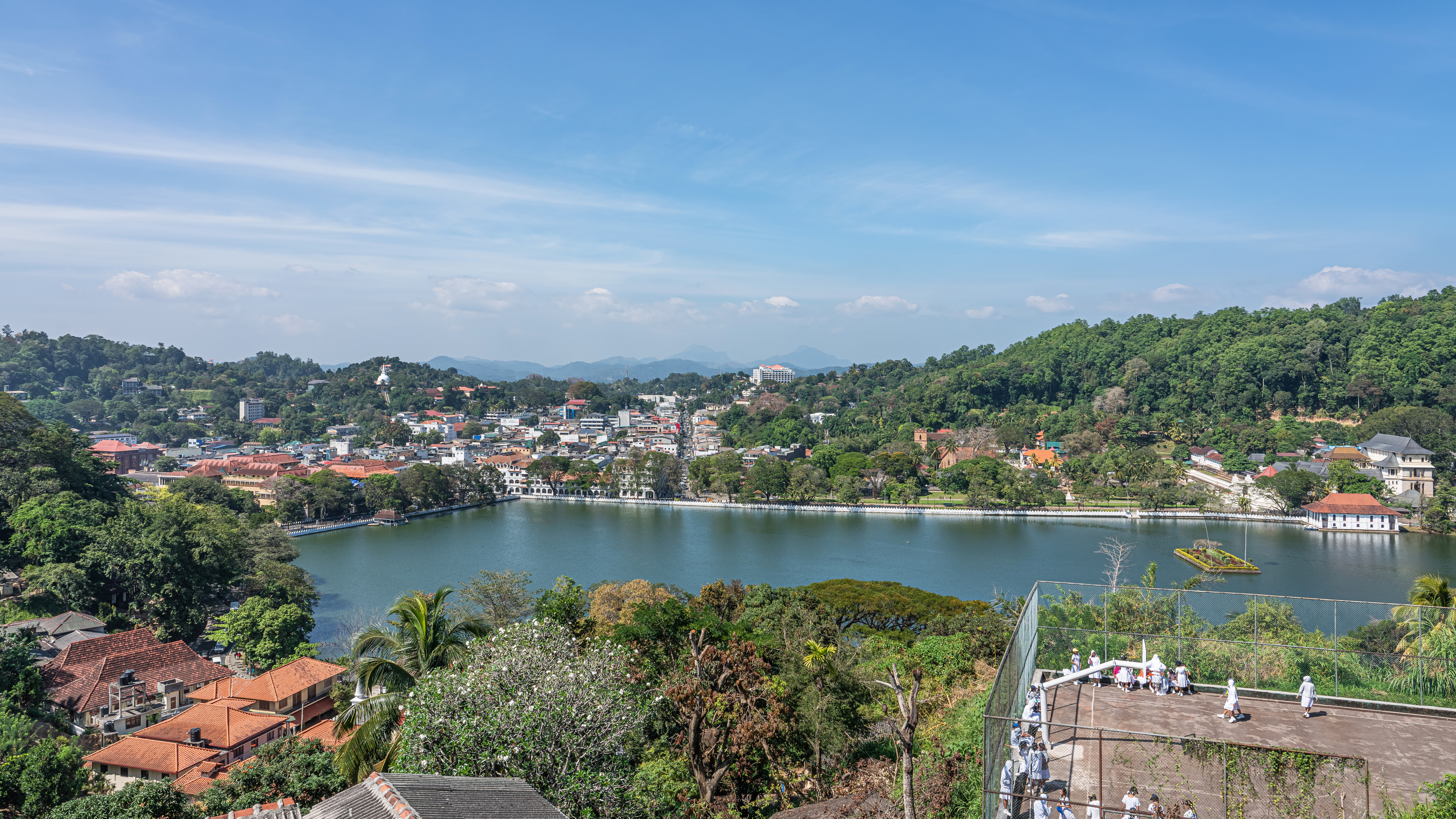
Kandy Lake built by Sri Vickrama Rajasinha

He also donated more lands to Dalada Maligawa and the King gave high prominence to Dalada Perahara. Sri Vickrama Rajasinha embraced Buddhism and did sacrifices to the Tooth Relic of Buddha. Several ministers under the king conspired against him. They actively provided intelligence to the British Empire. On 14 February 1815, a British division entered Kandy and took possession of the city. Several of the ministers signed the Kandyan Convention which was an agreement for the deposition of Sri Vikrama Rajasinha and ceding of the Kingdom's territory to British rule. There were twelve signatories to the Kandyan Convention signed in the following languages: four signed in Tamil, three, in Tamil and Sinhalese and four, in Sinhalese. This act effectively ended the Sovereignty of the Kandy Nayakar Dynasty. The king was captured by the British and send to Madurai as a prisoner. The signing of the convention is known as the greatest act of traitorship in Sri Lankan history.

Vannimai were feudal land divisions ruled by Vanniar chiefs south of the Jaffna Peninsula in northern Sri Lanka. Pandara Vanniyan allied with the Kandy Nayakars led a rebellion against the British and Dutch colonial powers in Sri Lanka in 1802. He was able to liberate Mullaitivu and other parts of northern Vanni from Dutch rule. In 1803, Pandara Vanniyan was defeated by the British and Vanni came under British rule. During the Napoleonic Wars, fearing that French control of the Netherlands might deliver Sri Lanka to the French, Great Britain occupied the coastal areas of the island (which they called Ceylon) with little difficulty in 1795-96. Two years later, in 1798, the Kandyan king, Sri Rajadhi Rajasinha died of a fever. Following his death, a nephew of Rajadhi Rajasinha, eighteen-year-old Kannasamy, was crowned. The young king, now named Sri Vikrama Rajasinha, faced a British invasion in 1803 but successfully retaliated. The First Kandyan War ended in a stalemate.

Great Rebellion of 1817–18

The Great Rebellion of 1817–18 took place in the former Kandyan Kingdom after two years of it being captured by the British. The purpose of the rebellion was to make a blood relative of the Nayak kings named Doraisami the ruler again. Keppetipola Disawe was sent initially by the British government to stop the uprising but ended up joining the rebellion as its leader and is celebrated for his actions even today in Sri Lanka. The rebels captured Matale and Kandy before Keppetipola fell ill and was captured and beheaded by the British. His skull was abnormal — as it was wider than usual — and was sent to Britain for testing. It was returned to Sri Lanka after independence, and now rests in the Kandyan Museum. The rebellion failed due to a number of reasons. It was not well planned by the leaders. The areas controlled by some Chiefs who helped the British provided easy transport routes for British supplies. Doraisami who was said to have a claim to the Sinhalese throne was found not to have any relation.

== See also ==
- Mahavamsa
- List of Sinhalese monarchs
