= British Ceylon =

British territorial possession in Sri Lanka (1796–1948)

Coordinates: 7°N 80°E

Ceylon (1796–1802) British Settlements and Territories in the Island of Ceylon with its Dependencies (1802–1833) Island of Ceylon and its Territories and Dependencies (1833–1931) Island of Ceylon and its Dependencies (1931–1948)
- 1796–1948
- Flag
- Anthem: God Save the King/Queen
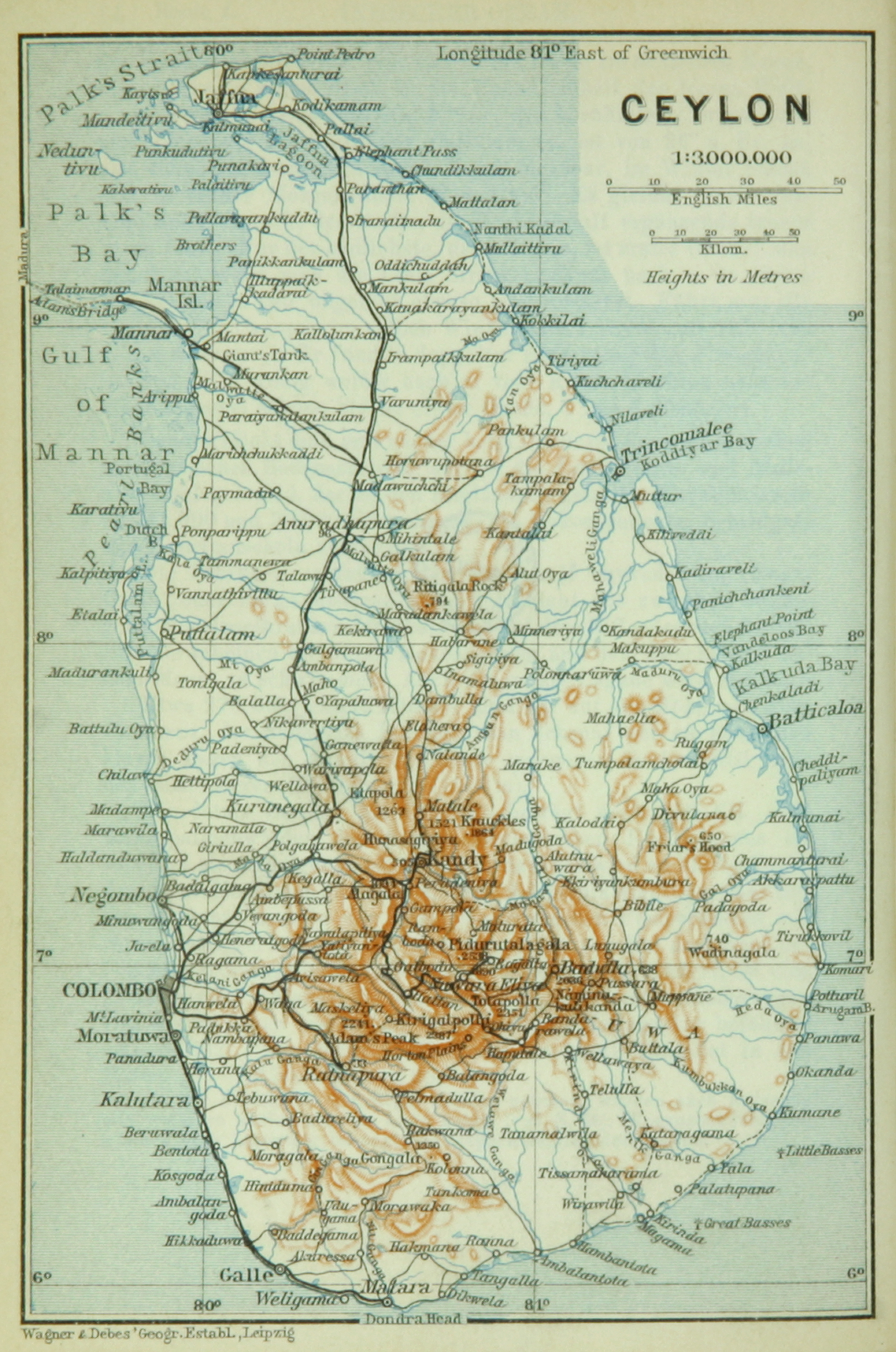
- British Ceylon map, published in Leipzig, c. 1914

- Territorial evolution of British Ceylon
- Status: Chartered territory of East India Company under India (Note: Administration based in India; a jurisdiction distinct from India) (1795/96–1802); Crown colony of the United Kingdom (1802–1948)
- Capital: Colombo
- Common languages: English (official); Sinhala; Tamil
- Government: Oligarchy (1796–1798); Dual administration (Note: East India company and the British crown) (1798–1802); Monarchy (1802–1948)
- Monarch
  - 1815–1820: George III (first)
  - 1936–1948: George VI (last)
- Governor
  - 1798–1805: Frederick North (first)
  - 1944–1948: Sir Henry Monck-Mason Moore (last)
- Prime Minister
  - 1947–1948: Don Stephen Senanayake
- Legislature: Legislative Council (1833–1931); State Council (1931–47); Parliament (1947–48)
- History
  - Capture of Dutch Ceylon: 5 March 1796
  - Establishment of dual administration: 12 October 1798
  - Proclamation of the Crown colony: 25 March 1802
  - Signing of Kandyan Convention: 2 March 1815
  - Independence: 4 February 1948

Area
- 1946: 65,993 km^{2} (25,480 sq mi)

Population
  - 1827: 889,584 (Note: Non scientific census of the whole island)
  - 1901: 3,565,954
  - 1946: 6,657,339
- Currency: Ceylonese rixdollar (1815–28); British pound (1825–71); Ceylonese rupee (1872–1948)
Preceded by
Kingdom of Kandy
Dutch Ceylon
Vanni chieftaincies
Succeeded by
Dominion of Ceylon
- Today part of: Sri Lanka

British Ceylon (Note: Sinhala: බ්‍රිතාන්‍ය ලංකාව, romanised: Britānya Langkāwa Tamil: பிரித்தானிய இலங்கை, romanised: Biritthāṉiya Ilaṅkai) (Note: Officially British Settlements and Territories in the Island of Ceylon with its Dependencies from 1802 to 1833, then the Island of Ceylon and its Territories and Dependencies from 1833 to 1931 and finally the Island of Ceylon and its Dependencies from 1931 to 1948.) refers to the imperial possessions of the United Kingdom in the island of Ceylon, present-day Sri Lanka, between 1796 and 4 February 1948. Initially, the area it covered did not include the Kingdom of Kandy, which was a protectorate, but from 1817 to 1948 the British possessions included the whole island. The British Ceylon period is the history of Sri Lanka between 1815 and 1948. It follows the fall of the Kandyan Kingdom into the hands of the British Empire, ending over 2300 years of Sinhalese monarchy. The British rule on the island lasted until 1948 when the country regained independence following the Sri Lankan independence movement.

== Context ==
Periodisation of Sri Lanka history:

Dates	Period	Period	Span (years)	Subperiod	Span (years)	Main government
300,000 BP	Prehistoric Sri Lanka	Stone Age	300,000		–	Unknown
~1000 BCE–543 BCE	Prehistoric Sri Lanka	Iron Age	457		–	Republic
543 BCE–437 BCE	Ancient Sri Lanka	Pre-Anuradhapura	106		–	Monarchy
437 BCE–463 CE	Ancient Sri Lanka	Anuradhapura	1454	Early Anuradhapura	900	Monarchy
463–691	Ancient Sri Lanka	Anuradhapura	1454	Middle Anuradhapura	228	Monarchy
691–1017	Post-classical Sri Lanka	Anuradhapura	1454	Late Anuradhapura	326	Monarchy
1017–1070	Post-classical Sri Lanka	Polonnaruwa	215	Chola conquest	53	Monarchy
1055–1196	Post-classical Sri Lanka	Polonnaruwa	215	High Polonnaruwa	141	Monarchy
1196–1232	Post-classical Sri Lanka	Polonnaruwa	215	Late Polonnaruwa	36	Monarchy
1232–1341	Post-classical Sri Lanka	Transitional	365	Dambadeniya	109	Monarchy
1341–1412	Post-classical Sri Lanka	Transitional	365	Gampola	71	Monarchy
1412–1592	Early Modern Sri Lanka	Transitional	365	Kotte	180	Monarchy
1592–1707	Early Modern Sri Lanka	Kandyan	223	Early Kandyan	115	Monarchy
1707–1760	Early Modern Sri Lanka	Kandyan	223	Middle Kandyan	53	Monarchy
1760–1815	Early Modern Sri Lanka	Kandyan	223	Late Kandyan	55	Monarchy
1815–1833	Modern Sri Lanka	British Ceylon	133	Post-Kandyan	18	Colonial monarchy
1833–1927	Modern Sri Lanka	British Ceylon	133	Colebrooke–Cameron Reforms era	94	Colonial monarchy
1927–1948	Modern Sri Lanka	British Ceylon	133	Donoughmore Reforms era	21	Colonial monarchy
1948–1972	Contemporary Sri Lanka	Sri Lanka since 1948	78	Dominion	24	Constitutional monarchy
1972–present	Contemporary Sri Lanka	Sri Lanka since 1948	78	Republic	54	Unitary semi-presidential constitutional republic

== History ==
=== Background ===
The first Europeans to visit Ceylon in modern times were the Portuguese: Lourenço de Almeida arrived in 1505, finding the island divided into seven warring kingdoms and unable to fend off intruders. The Portuguese founded a fort at the port city of Colombo in 1517 and gradually extended their control over the coastal areas. In 1592 the Sinhalese moved their capital to the inland city of Kandy, a location more secure against attack from invaders. Intermittent warfare continued through the 16th century. Many Lowland Ceylonese were forced to convert to Christianity while the coastal Moors were religiously persecuted and forced to retreat to the Central highlands while some of them desired to leave the country. The Buddhist majority disliked Portuguese occupation and its influences and welcomed any power who might rescue them and defeat the Portuguese. In 1602, therefore, when the Dutch captain Joris van Spilbergen landed, the king of Kandy appealed to him for help.

In 1669, the British sea captain Robert Knox landed by chance on Ceylon and was captured by the king of Kandy. He escaped 19 years later and wrote an account of his stay. This helped to bring the island to the attention of the British.

The island attracted the attention of the newly formed Dutch Republic when they were invited by the Sinhalese King to fight the Portuguese. It was in 1639 that the Dutch attacked in earnest but ended with an agreement (which was disrespected by both parties), and not until 1656 that Colombo fell. By 1660 the Dutch controlled the whole island except the kingdom of Kandy. The Dutch (who were Protestants) persecuted the Catholics (the left-over Portuguese settlers) but left the Buddhists, Hindus and Muslims alone. However, they taxed the people far more heavily than the Portuguese had done. A mixed Dutch-Sri Lankan people known as Burgher people are the legacy of Dutch rule.

In the late 18th century the Dutch, weakened by their wars against Great Britain, were conquered by Napoleonic France, and their leaders became refugees in London. No longer able to govern their part of the island effectively, the Dutch transferred the rule of it to the British, although this was against the wishes of the Dutch residing there. The capture of the island immediately yielded £300,000 of money in goods, as well as the acquisition of the cinnamon plantations, making this a valuable venture.

=== Post-Kandyan period (1815–1833) ===
==== Kandyan Wars ====
In 1803, as soon as Great Britain gained the European-controlled parts of Sri Lanka from the Dutch, they wanted to expand their new sphere of influence by making the native Kingdom of Kandy a protectorate, an offer initially refused by the King of Kandy. Although the previous Dutch administration had not been powerful enough to threaten the reign of the Kandyan Kings, the British were much more powerful. The Kandyan refusal to accept a protectorate led eventually (1803) to the 1st Kandyan War, but was repulsed. In 1815 Kandy was captured in the Second Kandyan War, ending Sri Lankan independence.

The rule of King Sri Vikrama Rajasinghe was not favoured by his chieftains. The king, who was of South Indian ancestry, faced powerful chieftains and sought cruel measures to repress their popularity with the people. A successful coup was organised by the Sinhala chiefs in which they accepted the British Crown as their new sovereign. This ended the line of the kingdom of Kandy and King Rajasinghe was taken as a prisoner, ending his hope that the British would allow him to retain power. The Kandyan treaty which was signed in 1815 was called the Kandyan Convention and stated the terms under which the Kandyans would live as a British protectorate. The Buddhist religion was to be given protection by the Crown, and Christianity would not be imposed on the population, as had happened during Portuguese and Dutch rule. The Kandyan Convention is an important legal document because it specifies the conditions which the British promised for the Kandyan territory.

It took the ruling families of Kandy less than two years to realise that the authority of the British government was a fundamentally different one to that of the (deposed) Nayakkar dynasty. Soon the Kandyans rebelled against the British and waged a guerrilla war. Discontent with British activities soon boiled over into open rebellion, commencing in the duchy of Uva in 1817, so-called the Uva Rebellion, also known as the Third Kandyan War. The main cause of the rebellion was the British authorities' failure to protect and uphold the customary Buddhist traditions, which were viewed by the islanders as an integral part of their lives.

The rebellion, which soon developed into a guerrilla war of the kind the Kandyans had fought against European powers for centuries, was centred on the Kandyan nobility and their unhappiness with developments under British rule since 1815. However it was the last uprising of this kind and in the Uva Province a scorched earth policy was pursued, which included the killing of cattle and other livestock, the destruction of private property (including homes and stocks of salt) and the burning of rice paddies. In the rebellion, more than 10,000 Sinhalese were killed. In addition to the scorched earth policies, the colonial government also confiscated properties owned by insurgents. The British Crown annexed the Kingdom of Kandy to British Ceylon in 1817.

=== Reform and reconstruction (1833–1850) ===
A group of British appointed Kandyan chiefs, with John Penry Lewis, Government Agent, Central Province in 1905

Following the suppression of the Uva Rebellion, the Kandyan peasantry was stripped of their lands by the Crown Lands (Encroachments) Ordinance No. 12 of 1840 (sometimes called the Crown Lands Ordinance or the Waste Lands Ordinance), a modern enclosure movement and reduced to penury. The British found that the uplands of Sri Lanka were very suited to coffee, tea and rubber cultivation, and by the mid-19th century Sri Lankan tea had become a staple of the British market, bringing great wealth to a small class of European tea planters. To work the estates, the planters imported large numbers of Tamil workers as indentured labourers from south India, who soon made up 10% of the island's population. These workers lived in harsh conditions and were accommodated in line rooms, not very different from cattle sheds.

The British colonial government favoured the semi-European Burghers, certain high-caste Sinhalese and the Tamils who were mainly concentrated to the north of the country while ignoring the other ethnic groups on the island. Nevertheless, the British also introduced democratic elements to Sri Lanka for the first time in its history. The Burghers were given some degree of self-government as early as 1833. It was not until 1909 that constitutional development began with a partly elected assembly, and not until 1920 that elected members outnumbered official appointees. Universal suffrage was introduced in 1931, over the protests of the Sinhalese, Tamil and Burgher elite who objected to the common people being allowed to vote.

=== Plantation economy (1850–1910) ===
Sivasundaram argues, reinforcing the analysis first made by famed local historian, G.C. Mendis in his book, Ceylon Under the British, that the British used geographical knowledge to defeat the Kandyan holdouts in the mountainous and jungle areas in the centre of Ceylon. They used local informants and British surveyors to map the island, and then built a network of roads to open the central region. This made possible export production of plantation agriculture, as well as tighter military control.

With its trading ports of Trincomalee and Colombo, the colony was one of the very few sources of cinnamon in the world. The spice was extremely valuable, and the British East India Company began to cultivate it in 1767, but Sri Lanka remained the main producer until the end of the 18th century.

The laying of the railway was carried out during the Governorship of Sir Henry Ward. Other major works of the British include road-building projects and the establishment of coffee and tea plantations, hospitals, and maternity homes.

=== Economic stagnation (1910–1927) ===
The Ceylon National Congress (CNC) was founded to agitate for greater autonomy. The party soon split along ethnic and caste lines. Prof. K. M. de Silva, the famous Peradeniya historian has pointed out that the refusal of the Ceylon Tamils to accept minority status to be one of the main causes which broke up the CNC. The CNC did not seek independence or "Swaraj". What may be called the independence movement broke into two streams, viz., the "constitutionalists", who sought independence by gradual modification of the status of Ceylon, and the more radical groups associated with the Colombo Youth League, Labour movement of Goonasinghe, and the Jaffna Youth Congress. These organisations were the first to raise the cry of Swaraj, or outright independence, following the Indian example, when Jawaharlal Nehru, Sarojini Naidu and other Indian leaders visited Ceylon in 1926. The efforts of the constitutionalists led to the arrival of the Donoughmore Commission reforms (1931) and the Soulbury Commission recommendations, which essentially upheld the 1944 draft constitution of the Board of ministers headed by D. S. Senanayake. The Marxist Lanka Sama Samaja Party (LSSP), which grew out of the Youth Leagues in 1935, made the demand for outright independence a cornerstone of their policy. Its deputies in the State Council, N.M. Perera and Philip Gunawardena, were aided in this struggle by Colvin R. de Silva, Leslie Goonewardene, Vivienne Goonewardene, Edmund Samarakkody and K. Natesa Iyer. They also demanded the replacement of English as the official language by Sinhala and Tamil. The Marxist groups were a tiny minority and yet their movement was viewed with grave suspicion by the British administration. The concerted (but ineffective) attempts to rouse the public against the British Raj in revolt would have led to certain bloodshed and a delay in independence. British state papers released in the 1950s show that the Marxist movement had a very negative impact on the policy makers at the Colonial office.

=== Towards independence (1927–1948) ===
The Soulbury Commission was the most important result of the agitation for constitutional reform in the 1930s. The Tamil leadership had by then fallen into the hands of G. G. Ponnambalam who had rejected the "Ceylonese identity". Ponnamblam had declared himself a "proud Dravidian", and attempted to establish an independent identity for the Tamils. Ponnamblam was a politician who attacked the Sinhalese, and their historical chronicle known as the Mahavamsa. One such inflamed attack in Navalapitiya led to the first Sinhala-Tamil riot in 1939. Ponnambalam opposed universal franchise, supported the caste system. This "50-50" or "balanced representation" policy became the hallmark of Tamil politics of the time. Ponnambalam also accused the D. S. Senanayake government of having established colonisation in "traditional Tamil areas", and having favoured the Buddhists by the Buddhist temporalities act. The Soulbury Commission rejected these submissions by Ponnambalam, and even noted their unacceptable communal character. Sinhalese writers pointed out the large immigration of Tamils to the southern urban centres, especially after the opening of the Jaffna-Colombo railway. Meanwhile, Senanayake, Baron Jayatilleke, Oliver Gunatilleke and others lobbied the Soulbury Commission without confronting them officially. The unofficial submissions contained what was to later become the draft constitution of 1944.

The close collaboration of the D. S. Senanayake government with the war-time British administration led to the support of Lord Louis Mountbatten. His dispatches and a telegram to the Colonial office supporting Independence for Ceylon have been cited by historians as having helped the Senanayake government to secure the independence of Sri Lanka. The shrewd cooperation with the British as well as diverting the needs of the war market to Ceylonese markets as a supply point, managed by Oliver Goonatilleke, also led to a very favourable fiscal situation for the newly independent government.

==== Second World War ====
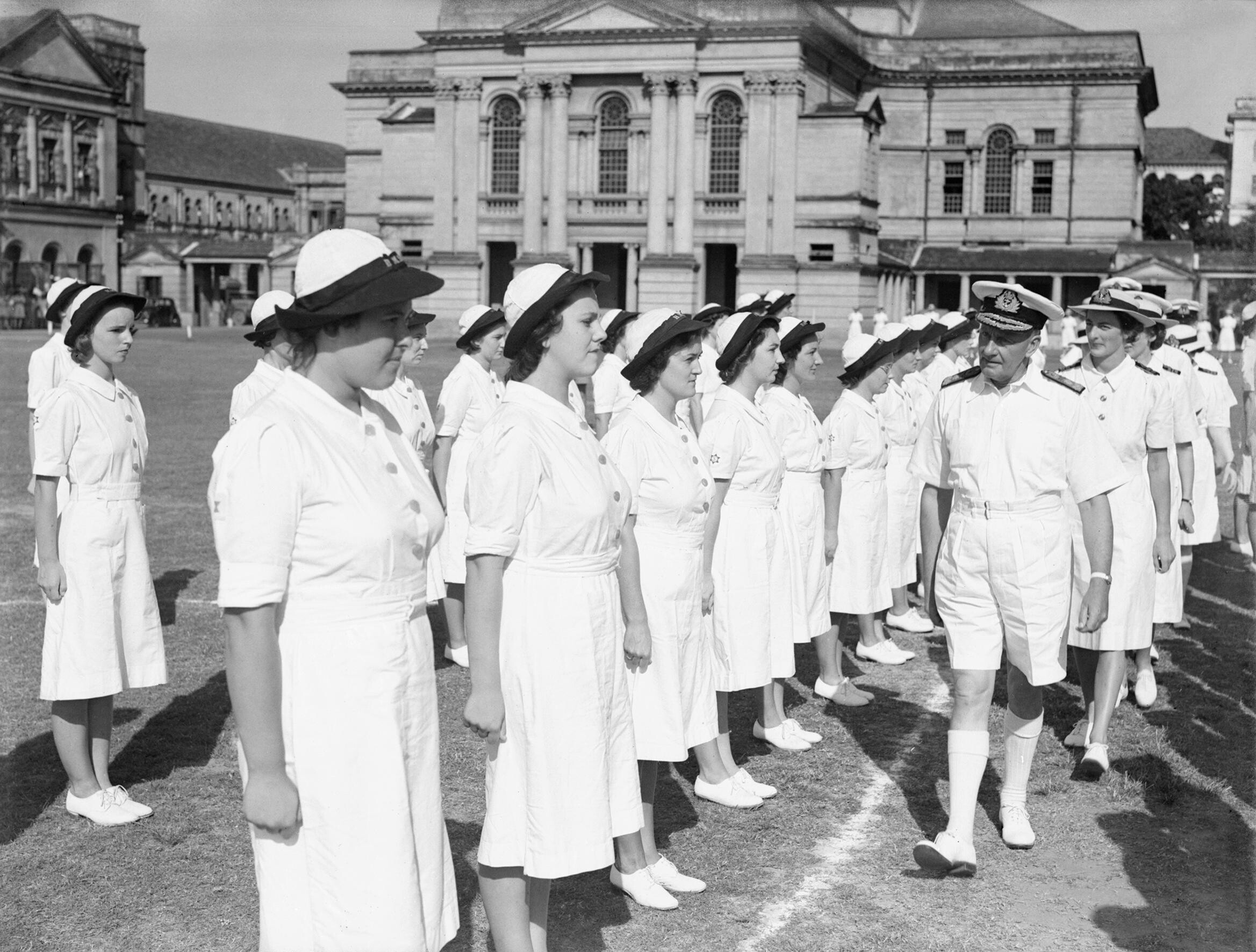
Admiral Sir James Somerville inspecting a detachment of Wrens serving with the East Indies Fleet in Colombo, July 1944

During World War II, Sri Lanka was a front-line British base against the Japanese. Opposition to the war in Sri Lanka was orchestrated by Marxist organisations. The leaders of the LSSP pro-independence agitation were arrested by the Colonial authorities. On 5 April 1942, the Japanese Navy bombed Colombo, which led to the flight of Indian merchants, dominant in the Colombo commercial sector. This flight removed a major political problem facing the Senanayake government. Marxist leaders also escaped, to India, where they participated in the independence struggle there. The movement in Ceylon was minuscule, limited to the English educated intelligentsia and trade unions, mainly in the urban centres. These groups were led by Robert Gunawardena, Philip's brother. In stark contrast to this "heroic" but ineffective approach to the war, the Senanayake government took advantage of the war to further its rapport with the commanding elite. Ceylon became crucial to the British Empire in the war, with Lord Louis Mountbatten using Colombo as his headquarters for the Eastern Theater. Oliver Goonatilleka successfully exploited the markets for the country's rubber and other agricultural products to replenish the treasury. Nonetheless, Sinhalese continued to agitate for independence and Sinhalese sovereignty, using the opportunities offered by the war to establish a special relationship with Britain.

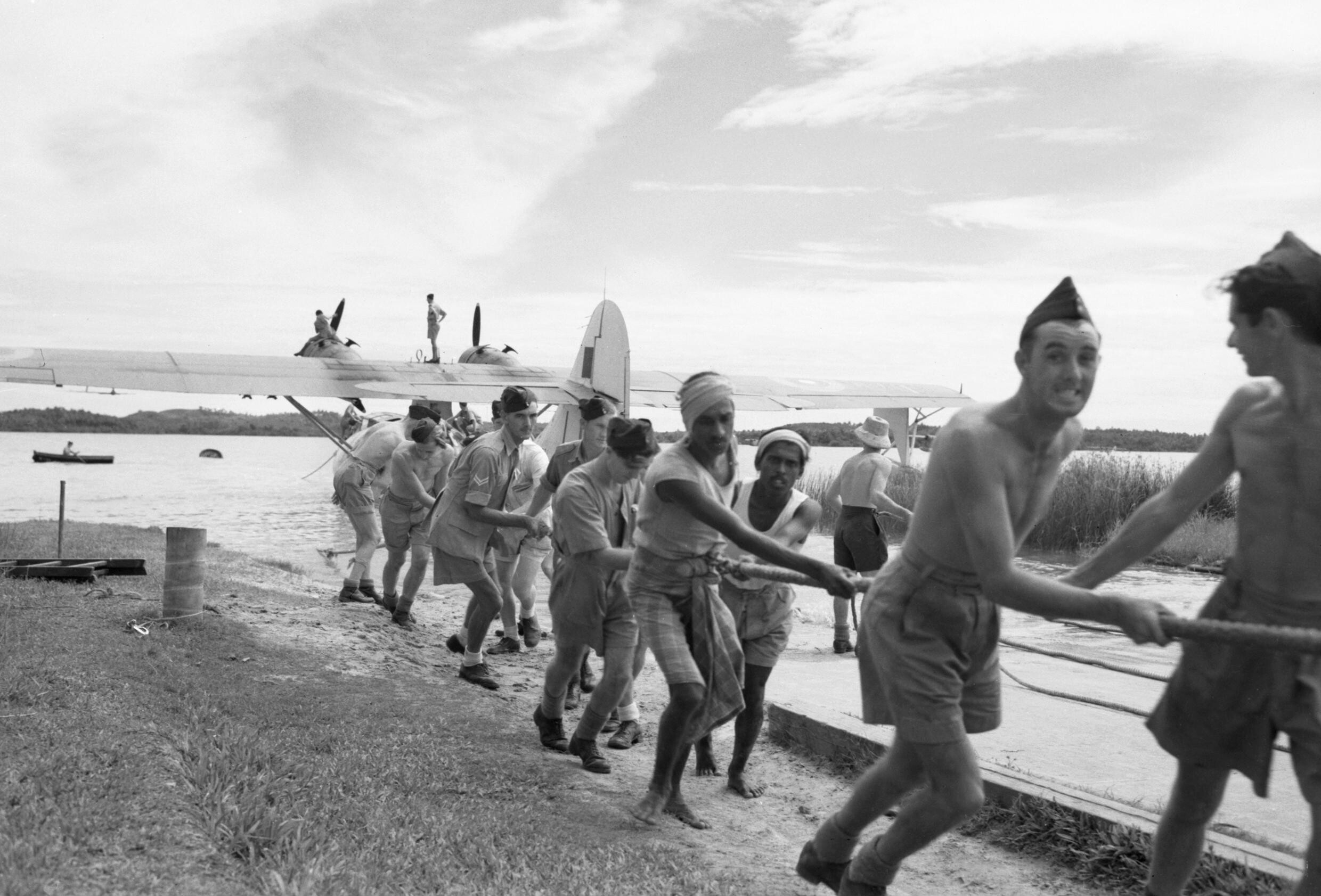
RAF crew and local Sinhalese in August 1945

Meanwhile, the Marxists, identifying the war as a sideshow between rival empires and desiring a proletarian revolution, chose a path of agitation disproportionate to their negligible combat strength and diametrically opposed to the "constitutionalist" approach of Senanayake and other Ethnic Sinhalese leaders. A small garrison on the Cocos Islands, crewed by Ceylonese, attempted to expel the British. It has been claimed that the LSSP had some hand in the action, though this is far from clear. Three of the participants were the only British Subject Peoples to be shot for "mutiny" during World War II.

Sri Lankans in Singapore and Malaysia formed the 'Lanka Regiment' of the Indian National Army.

The constitutionalists, led by D. S. Senanayake, (the first prime minister) succeeded in winning independence. The Soulbury constitution was essentially what Senanayake's board of ministers had drafted in 1944. The promise of Dominion status, and independence itself, had been given by the Colonial office

==== Post-war ====
The Sinhalese leader Don Stephen Senanayake left the CNC on the issue of independence, disagreeing with the revised aim of 'the achieving of freedom', although his real reasons were more subtle. He subsequently formed the United National Party (UNP) in 1946, when a new constitution was agreed on, based on the behind-the-curtain lobbying of the Soulbury Commission. At the elections of 1947, the UNP won a minority of the seats in Parliament but formed a coalition with the Sinhala Maha Sabha of Solomon Bandaranaike and the Tamil Congress of G.G. Ponnambalam. The successful inclusions of the Tamil-communalist leader Ponnambalam, and his Sinhala counterpart Bandaranaike were a remarkable political balancing act by Senanayake. However, the vacuum in Tamil Nationalist politics created by Ponnamblam's transition to a moderate opened the field for the Tamil Arasu Kachchi, a Tamil sovereignist party (rendered into English as the "Federal" party) led by S. J. V. Chelvanaykam, the lawyer son of a Christian minister.

== Demographics ==
Historical population
Year	Pop.	±%
1871	2,400,380	—
1881	2,759,700	+15.0%
1891	3,007,800	+9.0%
1901	3,566,000	+18.6%
1911	4,106,400	+15.2%
1921	4,498,600	+9.6%
1931	5,306,000	+17.9%
1946	6,657,300	+25.5%
Source: Department of Census and Statistics Sri Lanka

The multiracial population of Ceylon was numerous enough to support the European colonists; the Portuguese and the Dutch offspring of the past 440 odd years of colonial history was large enough to run a stable government. Unlike the previous rulers, the British embarked on a plantation programme which initially brought coffee plantations to the island. These were later wiped out by coffee rust. Coffee plants were replaced by tea and rubber plantations. This made Ceylon one of the richest countries in Asia.

The British also brought Tamils from British India and made them indentured labourers in the Hill Country. This was in addition to the several hundred thousand Tamils already living in the Maritime provinces and another 30,000 Tamil Muslims. The linguistically bipolar island needed a link language and English became universal in Ceylon.

Censuses in Ceylon began in 1871 and continued every ten years. The 1881 census shows a total population of 2.8 million, consisting of 1.8 million Sinhalese; 687,000 Ceylon and Indian Tamils; 185,000 Moors; as well as 4,800 Europeans; 17,900 Burghers and Eurasians; 8,900 Malays; 2,200 Veddhas; and 7,500 other.

The Censuses of 1871, 1881, 1891 and 1901 had shown Ceylon Tamils and Indian Tamils of Sri Lanka grouped together. By 1911 Indian Tamils were shown as a separate category. The population statistics reveal that by 1911, Indian Tamils constituted 12.9%, whereas Sri Lankan Tamils formed 12.8% of the population of 4,106,400; in 1921, 13.4% and 11.5%; in 1931, 15.2% and 11.3%, and in 1946, 11.7% and 11.0% respectively. The censuses show that during a large period of time in the history of Ceylon, Indian Tamils outnumbered Ceylon Tamils until between 1971 and 1981 when more than 50 per cent of the Indian Tamil population were repatriated as Indian citizens back to India. However, many Indian Tamils were also granted Sri Lankan citizenship whereupon declared themselves as Sri Lankan Tamils.

== Government and military ==
=== British Governors of Ceylon ===
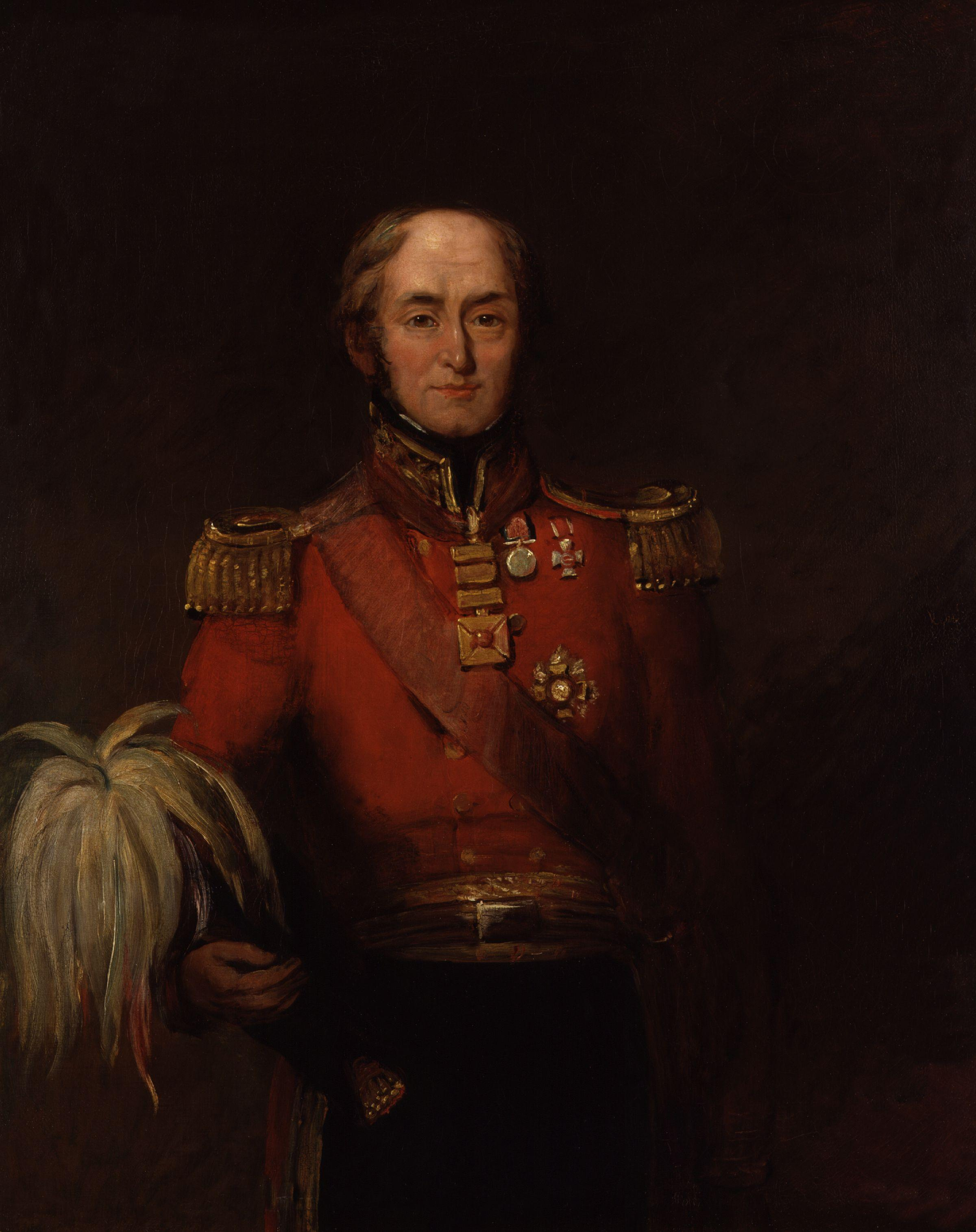
Sir Edward Barnes was Governor of Ceylon from 1824 to 1831

Between 1796 and 1948, Ceylon was a British Crown colony. Although the British monarch was the head of state, in practice his or her functions were exercised in the colony by the colonial Governor, who acted on instructions from the British government in London.

On the approach to self-government and independence, the Donoughmore Commission recommended the Donoughmore Constitution of 1931–1947, one of a series of attempts to create a workable solution that would allow for inter-communal differences. This was replaced by the Soulbury Commission proposals that led to the Dominion of Ceylon of 1948–1972, after which the Free, Sovereign and the Independent Republic of Sri Lanka was established.

=== Armed forces ===
The Ceylon Defence Force (CDF) was the military of British Ceylon. Established in 1881 as the Ceylon Volunteers, as the military reserve in the British Crown colony of Ceylon, by 1910 it grew into the Ceylon Defence Force, a regular force responsible for the defence of Ceylon. The CDF was under the command of the General Officer Commanding, Ceylon, of the British Army in Ceylon if mobilised. However, mobilisation could be carried out only under orders from the Governor. The Ceylon Defence Force has seen action in a number of wars such as the Second Boer War and both World Wars. It is the predecessor to the Ceylon Army.

Trincomalee Harbour was an important strategic base for the British Royal Navy until 1948, primarily to control the sea lanes of the Indian Ocean.

== See also ==
- Portuguese Ceylon
- Dutch Ceylon
- History of Sri Lanka
- 1906 malaria outbreak in Ceylon
- 1934–35 malaria outbreak in Ceylon
