= Polonnaruwa period =

Period in Sri Lankan history

- 1017–1232
Anuradhapura period	Transitional period
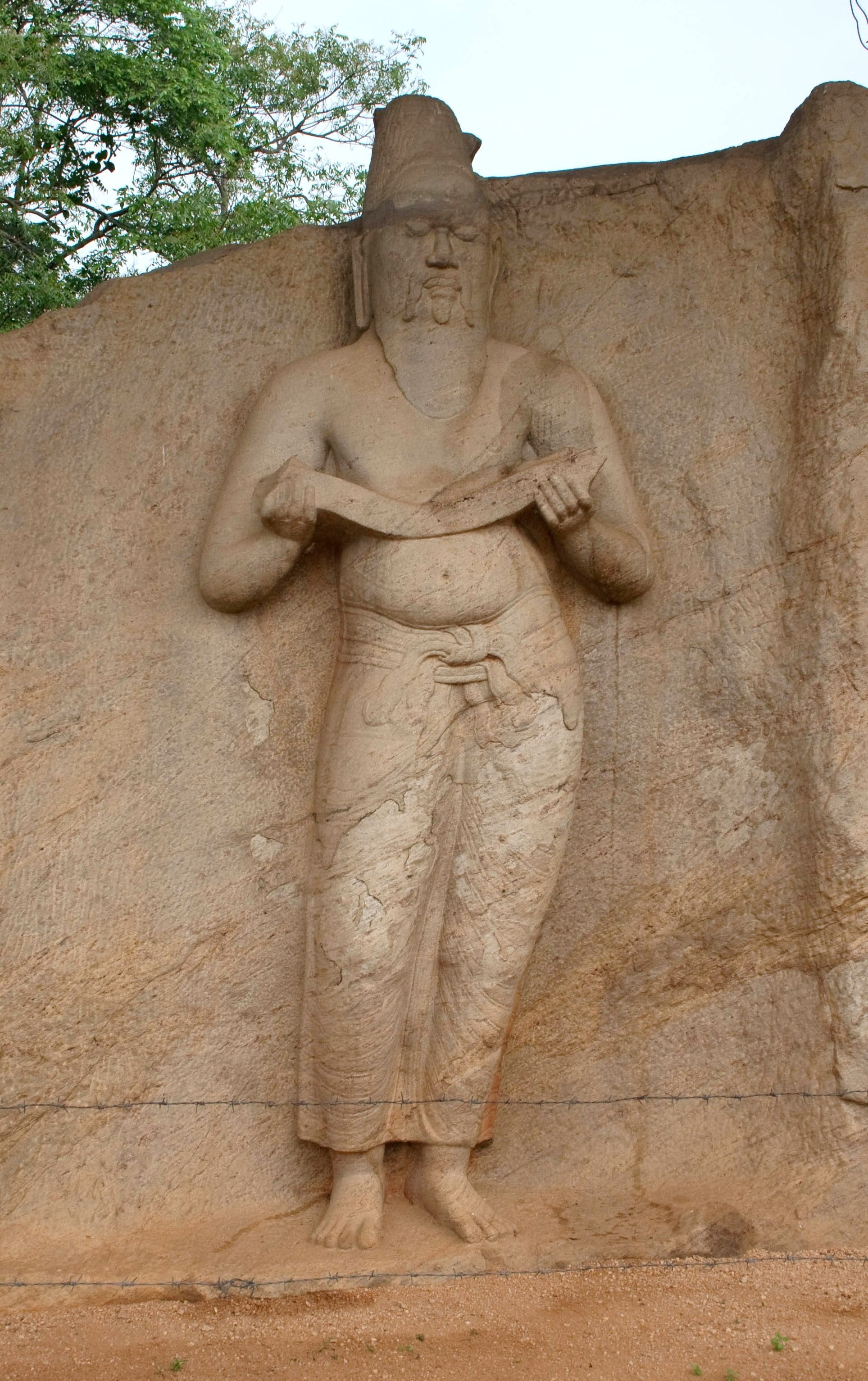
- Statue of Parakramabahu I
- Including: Chola conquest; Kingdom of Polonnaruwa
- Monarchs: House of Vijayabahu; House of Kalinga; Lokissara; Parakrama Pandyan II; Kalinga Magha

The Polonnaruwa period was a period in the history of Sri Lanka from 1017, after the Chola conquest of Anuradhapura and when the center of administration was moved to Polonnaruwa, to the end of the Kingdom of Polonnaruwa in 1232.

The Kingdom of Polonnaruwa was the second major Sinhalese kingdom of Sri Lanka. It lasted from 1055 under Vijayabahu I until 1212 under the rule of Lilavati. The Kingdom of Polonnaruwa came after the Anuradhapura Kingdom, which was invaded by Chola forces under Rajaraja I. It also followed the Kingdom of Ruhuna, in which the Sinhalese Kings ruled during Chola occupation.

== Overview ==
Periodization of Sri Lanka history:

Dates	Period	Period	Span (years)	Subperiod	Span (years)	Main government
300,000 BP	Prehistoric Sri Lanka	Stone Age	300,000		–	Unknown
~1000 BCE–543 BCE	Prehistoric Sri Lanka	Iron Age	457		–	Republic
543 BCE–437 BCE	Ancient Sri Lanka	Pre-Anuradhapura	106		–	Monarchy
437 BCE–463 CE	Ancient Sri Lanka	Anuradhapura	1454	Early Anuradhapura	900	Monarchy
463–691	Ancient Sri Lanka	Anuradhapura	1454	Middle Anuradhapura	228	Monarchy
691–1017	Post-classical Sri Lanka	Anuradhapura	1454	Late Anuradhapura	326	Monarchy
1017–1070	Post-classical Sri Lanka	Polonnaruwa	215	Chola conquest	53	Monarchy
1055–1196	Post-classical Sri Lanka	Polonnaruwa	215	High Polonnaruwa	141	Monarchy
1196–1232	Post-classical Sri Lanka	Polonnaruwa	215	Late Polonnaruwa	36	Monarchy
1232–1341	Post-classical Sri Lanka	Transitional	365	Dambadeniya	109	Monarchy
1341–1412	Post-classical Sri Lanka	Transitional	365	Gampola	71	Monarchy
1412–1592	Early Modern Sri Lanka	Transitional	365	Kotte	180	Monarchy
1592–1707	Early Modern Sri Lanka	Kandyan	223	Early Kandyan	115	Monarchy
1707–1760	Early Modern Sri Lanka	Kandyan	223	Middle Kandyan	53	Monarchy
1760–1815	Early Modern Sri Lanka	Kandyan	223	Late Kandyan	55	Monarchy
1815–1833	Modern Sri Lanka	British Ceylon	133	Post-Kandyan	18	Colonial monarchy
1833–1927	Modern Sri Lanka	British Ceylon	133	Colebrooke–Cameron Reforms era	94	Colonial monarchy
1927–1948	Modern Sri Lanka	British Ceylon	133	Donoughmore Reforms era	21	Colonial monarchy
1948–1972	Contemporary Sri Lanka	Sri Lanka since 1948	78	Dominion	24	Constitutional monarchy
1972–present	Contemporary Sri Lanka	Sri Lanka since 1948	78	Republic	54	Unitary semi-presidential constitutional republic

== Political history ==
=== Chola conquest (1017–1070) ===
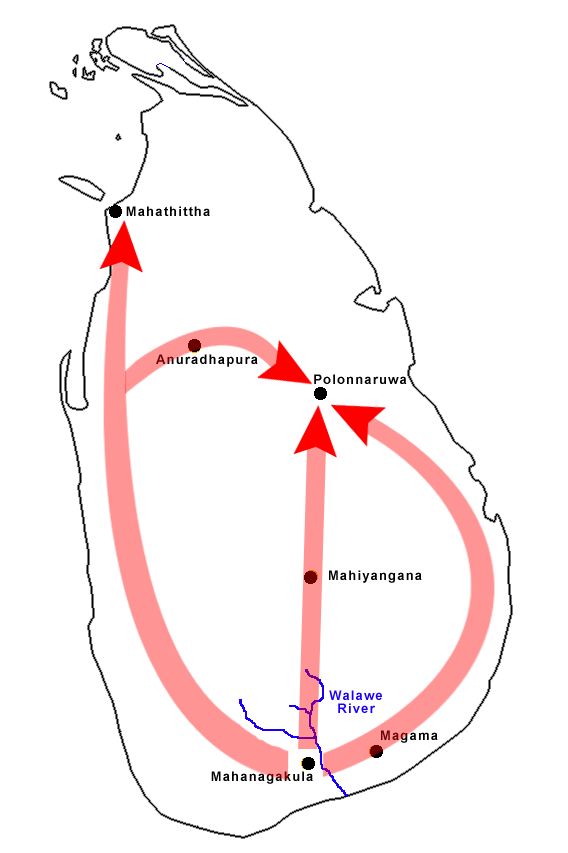
Vijayabāhu I sent three armies to attack Polonnaruwa. One was sent along the western shore to Mahatittha and Polonnaruwa, another from the east across Magama and the third and main force across Mahiyangana.

A partial consolidation of Chola power in Rajarata had succeeded the initial season of plunder. With the intention to transform Chola encampments into more permanent military enclaves, Saivite temples were constructed in Polonnaruva and in the emporium of Mahatittha. Taxation was also instituted, especially on merchants and artisans by the Cholas. In 1014 Rajaraja I died and was succeeded by his son Rajendra Chola I, perhaps the most aggressive king of his line. Chola raids were launched southward from Rajarata into Rohana. By his fifth year, Rajendra claimed to have completely conquered the island. The whole of Anuradhapura including the south-eastern province of Rohana were incorporated into the Chola Empire. As per the Sinhalese chronicle Mahavamsa, the conquest of Anuradhapura was completed in the 36th year of the reign of the Sinhalese monarch Mahinda V, i.e. about 1017–18. But the south of the island, which lacked large an prosperous settlements to tempt long-term Chola occupation, was never really consolidated by the Chola. Thus, under Rajendra, Chola predatory expansion in Sri Lanka began to reach a point of diminishing returns. According to the Culavamsa and Karandai plates, Rajendra Chola led a large army into Anuradhapura and captured Mahinda V's crown, queen, daughter, vast amount of wealth and the king himself whom he took as a prisoner to India, where he eventually died in exile in 1029. After the death of Mahinda V the Sinhalese monarchy continued to rule from Rohana until the Sinhalese kingdom was re-established in the north by Vijayabāhu I. Mahinda V was succeeded by his son Kassapa VI (1029–1040).

=== High Polonnaruwa period (1055–1196) ===
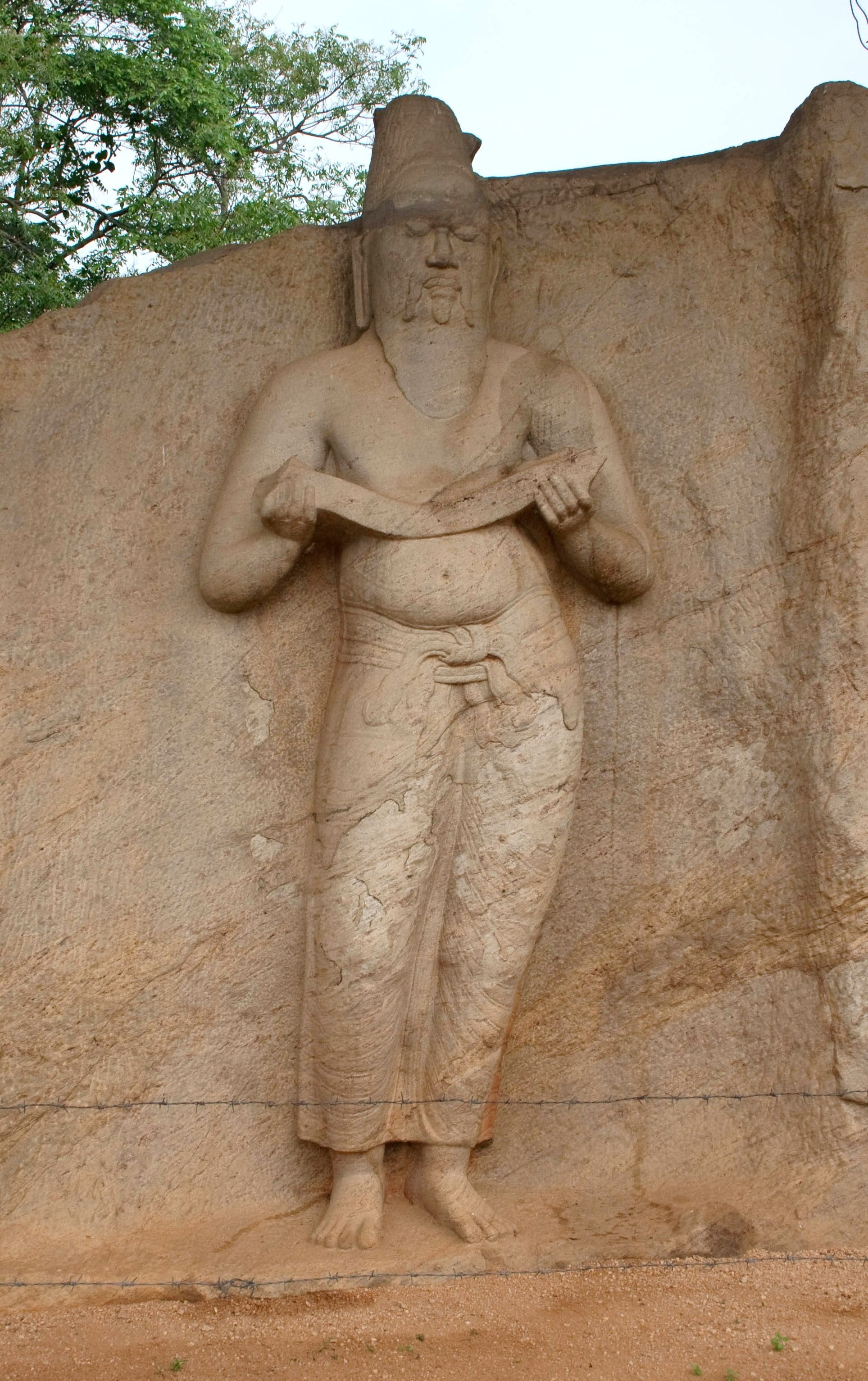
The statue traditionally held to be of Parākramabāhu the Great

Following a long war of liberation Vijayabāhu I successfully expelled the Cholas out of Sri Lanka as Chola determination began to gradually falter. Vijayabāhu possessed strategic advantages, even without a unified "national" force behind him. A prolonged war of attrition was of greater benefit to the Sinhalese than to the Cholas. After the accession of Virarajendra Chola (1063–1069) to the Chola throne, the Cholas were increasingly on the defensive, not only in Sri Lanka, but also in peninsular India, where they were hard-pressed by the attacks of the Chalukyas from the Deccan. Vijayabāhu launched a successful two-pronged attack upon Anuradhapura and Polonnaruva, when he could finally establish a firm base in southern Sri Lanka. Anuradhapura quickly fell and Polonnaruva was captured after a prolonged siege of the isolated Chola forces. Virarajendra Chola was forced to dispatch an expedition from the mainland to recapture the settlements in the north and carry the attack back into Rohana, in order to stave off total defeat. What had begun as a profitable incursion and occupation was now deteriorating into desperate attempts to retain a foothold in the north. After a further series of indecisive clashes the occupation finally ended in the withdrawal of the Cholas. By 1070 when Sinhalese sovereignty was restored under Vijayabāhu I, he had reunited the country for the first time in over a century.

Vijayabāhu I (1055–1110), descended from, or at least claimed to be descended from the House of Lambakanna II. He crowned himself in 1055 at Anuradhapura but continued to have his capital at Polonnaruwa as it was more central and made the task of controlling the turbulent province of Rohana much easier. Aside from leading the prolonged resistance to Chola rule Vijayabāhu I proved to be outstanding in administration and economic regeneration after the war and embarked on the rehabilitation of the island's irrigation network and the resuscitation of Buddhism in the country. Buddhism had suffered severely in the country during the Chola rule, where precedence was given to Saivite Hinduism. The influence of Hinduism on religion and society during this period also saw a hardening of caste attitudes in the Kingdom of Polonnaruwa. Economic, social structure, art and architecture of the Kingdom of Polonnaruwa was a continuation and development of that of the Anuradhapura period. Internal and external trade made the kingdom more prosperous than just relying on its primarily agricultural economy. Seafaring crafts were built in Sri Lanka and were known to have sailed as far as China, some may have even been used as troop transport ships to Burma. However those used in external trade were mostly of foreign construction. The island's importance as an important center of international trade attracted many foreign merchants, the most prominent of which were descendants of Arab traders. The south of India also hosted settlements of these Arab merchants, and they would become a dominant influence on the country's external trade, but it was by no means a monopoly.

Upon Vijayabāhu I's death a succession dispute jeopardized the recovery from the Chola conquest. His successors proved unable to consolidate power plunging the kingdom into a period of civil war, from which Parākramabāhu I (1153–1186), a closely related royal emerged. Parākramabāhu I established control over the island and secured his recognition as Vijayabāhu's heir by obtaining the Tooth and bowl relics of the Buddha, which by now had become essential to the legitimacy of royal authority in Sri Lanka.

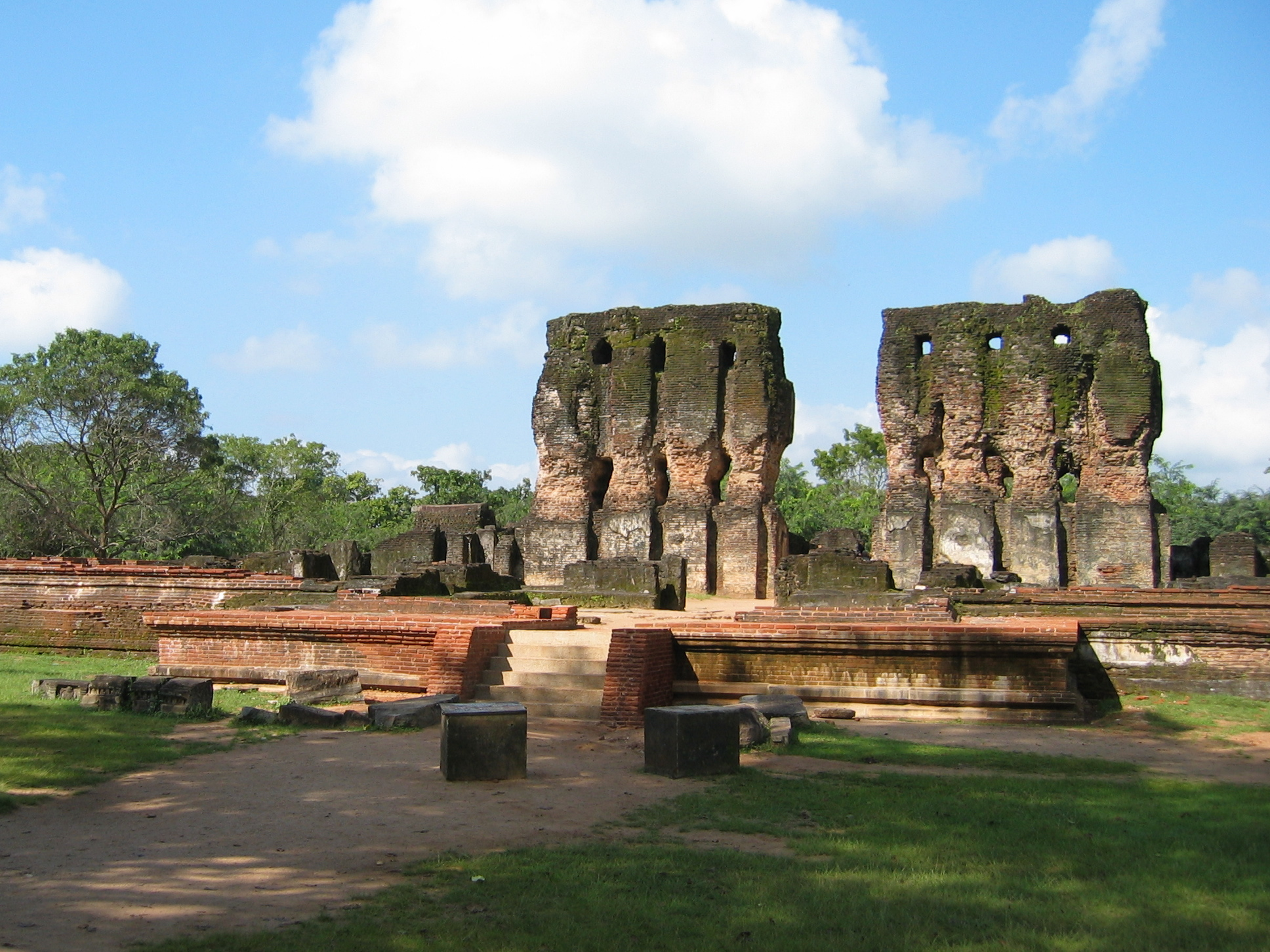
Ruins of Parākramabāhu's royal palace at Polonnaruwa

By the time of the Polonnaruwa period the Sinhalese has centuries of experience in irrigation technology behind them and so the Polonnaruwa kings, especially Parākramabāhu the Great, made distinguished contributions of their own at honing these techniques to cope with the special requirements of the immense irrigation projects at the time. Sri Lanka's irrigation network was extensively expanded during the reign of Parākramabāhu the Great. He built 1470 reservoirs – the highest number by any ruler in Sri Lanka's history – repaired 165 dams, 3910 canals, 163 major reservoirs, and 2376 mini-reservoirs. His most famous construction is the Parakrama Samudra, the largest irrigation project of medieval Sri Lanka. Having re-established the political unification of the island, Parākramabāhu continued Vijayabāhu policy in keeping a tight check on separatist tendencies within the island, especially in Rohana where particularism was a deeply ingrained political tradition. Parākramabāhu faced a formidable rebellion in 1160 as Rohana did not accept its loss of autonomy lightly. A rebellion in 1168 in Rajarata also manifested. Both were put down with great severity and all vestiges of its former autonomy purposefully eliminated. Particularism was now much less tolerated than it was during the Anuradhapura period. This new over-centralization of authority in Polonnaruwa would however work against the Sinhalese in the future and the country would eventually pay dearly as a result.

Parākramabāhu's reign is memorable for two major campaigns – in the south of India as part of a Pandyan war of succession, and a punitive strike against the kings of Ramanna (Myanmar) for various perceived insults to Sri Lanka. Parākramabāhu I was the last of the great ancient Sri Lankan kings. His reign is considered as a time when Sri Lanka was at the height of its power. Parākramabāhu had no sons, which complicated the problem of succession upon his death. Amid the succession crisis a scion of a foreign dynasty, Niśśaṅka Malla established his claims as a Prince of Kalinga, (Note: The birthplace of Prince Vijaya and the ancestors of the Sinhalese.) claiming to be chosen and trained for the succession by Parākramabāhu himself. He was also either the son-in-law or nephew of Parākramabāhu.

Niśśaṅka Malla (1187–1196) was the first monarch of the House of Kalinga and the only Polonnaruwa monarch to rule over the whole island after Parākramabāhu. His reign gave the country a brief decade of order and stability before the speedy and catastrophic break-up of the hydraulic civilisations of the dry zone. With his death there was a renewal of political dissension, now complicated by dynastic disputes. Though he and his predecessors Vijayabāhu and Parākramabāhu achieved much in state building. The conspicuous lack of restraint, especially that of Parākramabāhu, in combination with an ambitious and venturesome foreign policy, and an expensive diversion of state resources towards public works projects, sapped the strength of the country and contributed to its sudden and complete collapse.

=== Late Polonnaruwa period (1196–1232) ===
Polonnaruwa period (1017–1232)

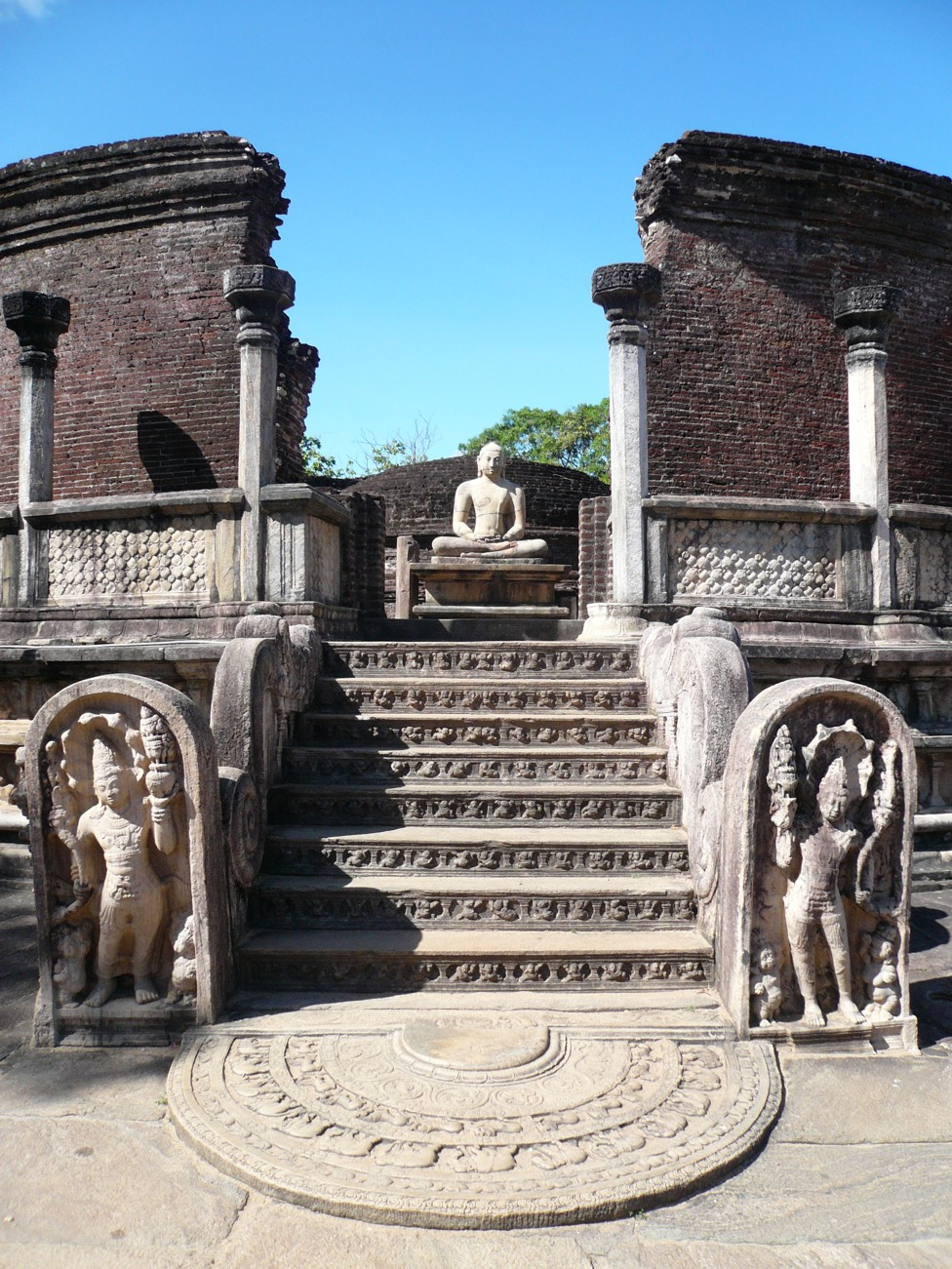
Polonnaruwa Vatadage

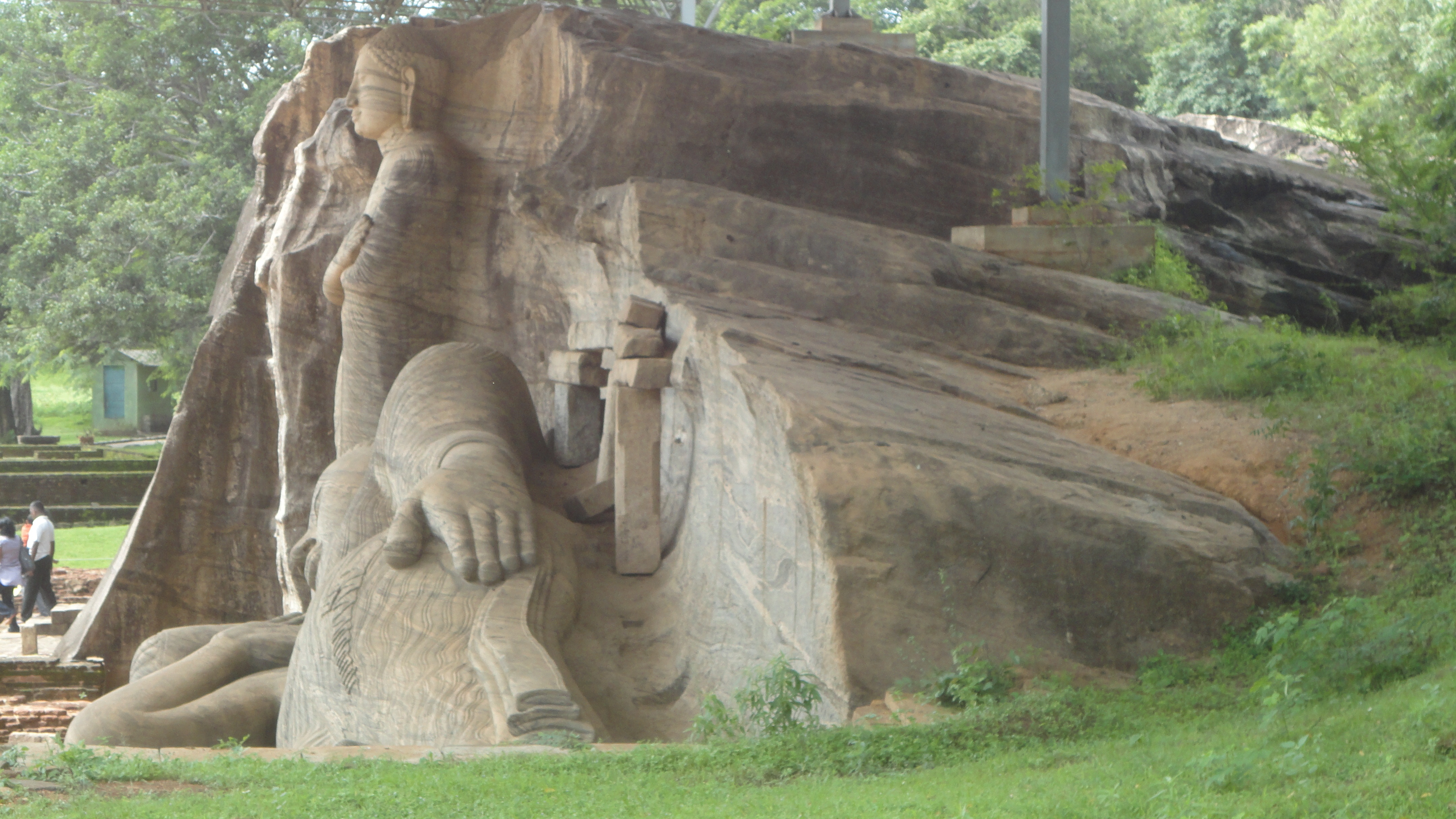
Gal Vihara

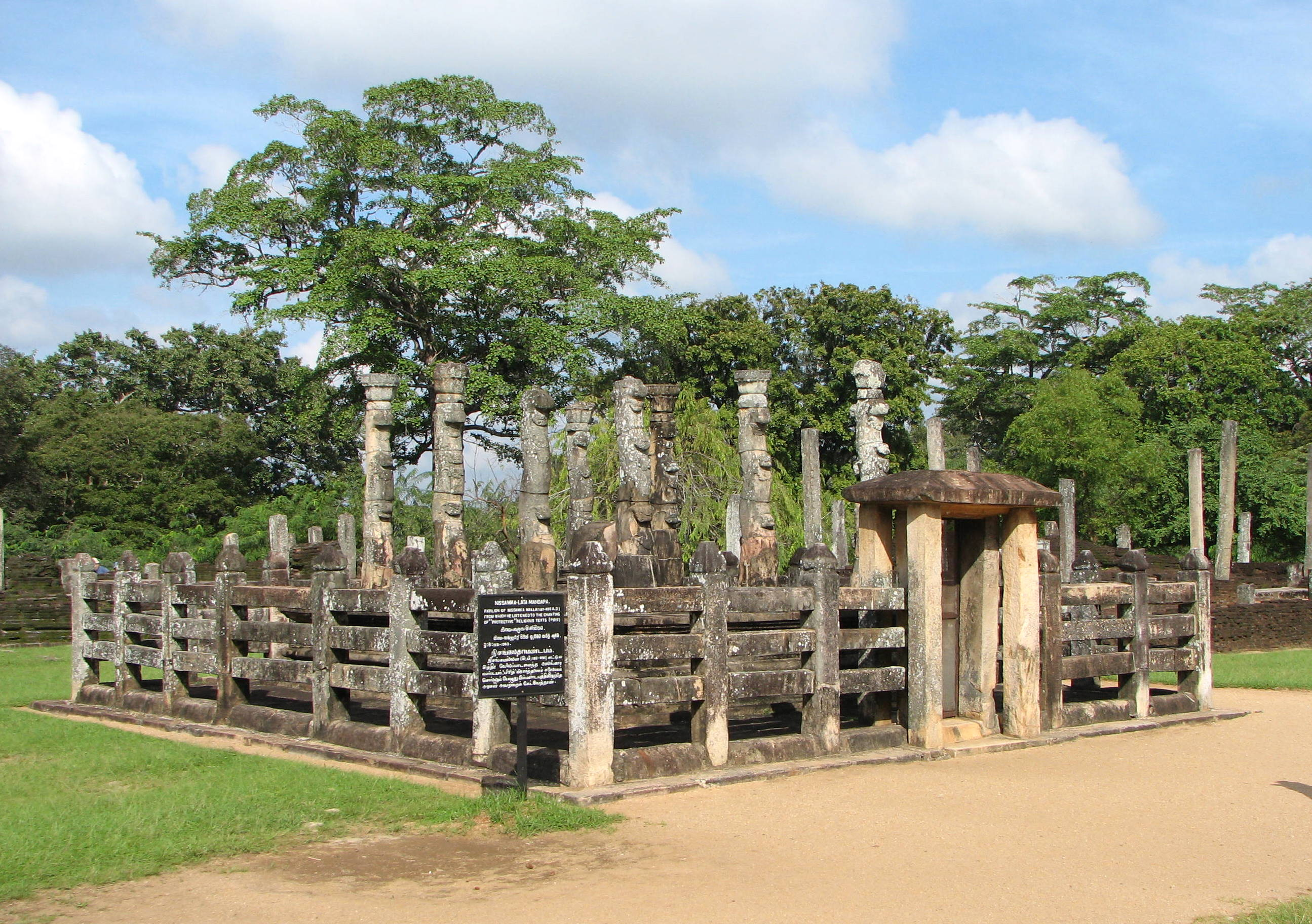
Nissanka Latha Mandapaya

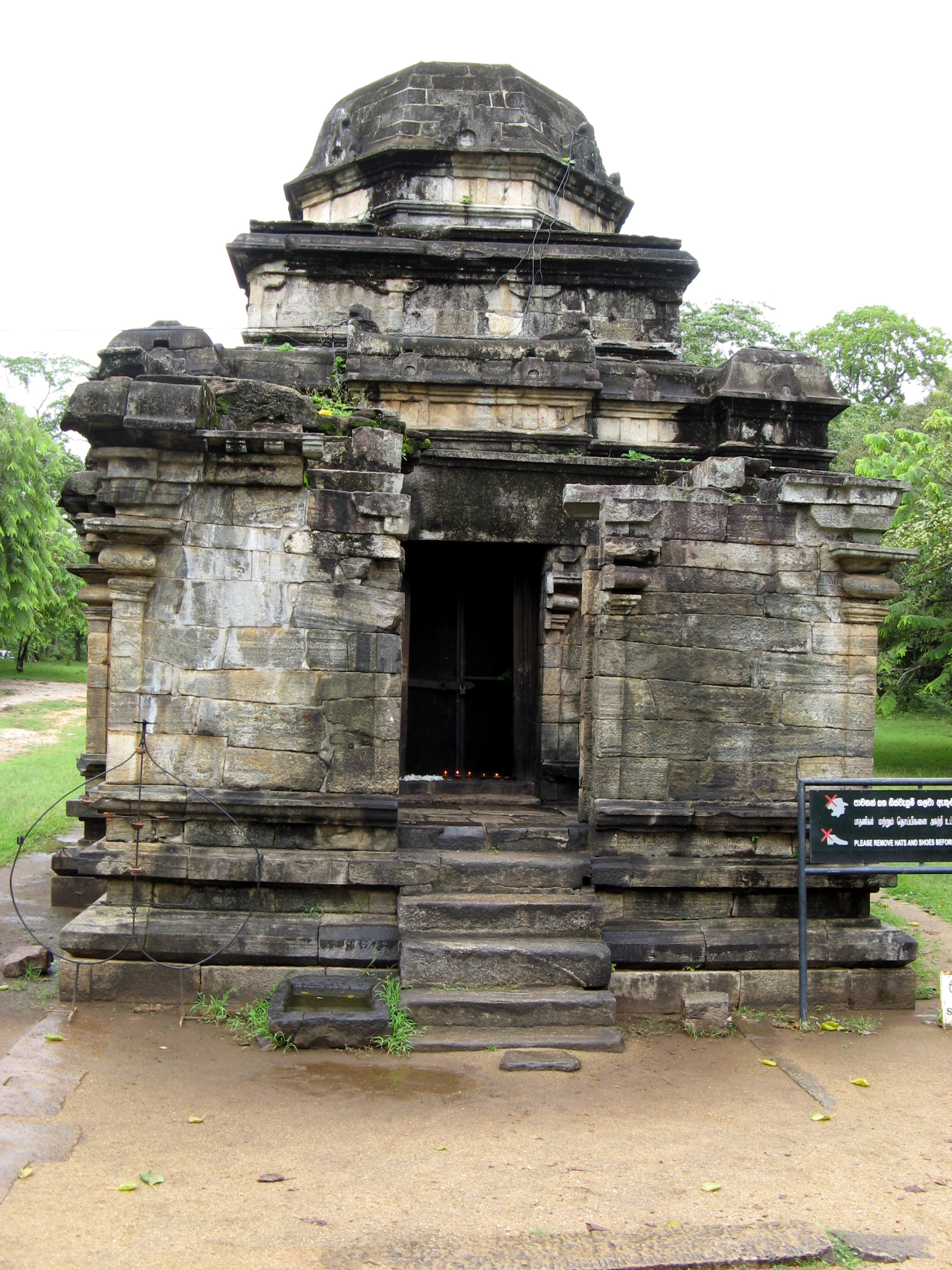
Polonnaruwa Siva Devale No. 2 (Note: Considered as one of the oldest Hindu shrine in Polonnaruwa founded during Chola occupation built during 1015-1044)

The House of Kalinga would maintain itself in power, but only with the support of an influential faction within the country. Their survival owed much to the inability of the factions opposing them to come up with an aspirant to the throne with a politically viable claim, or sufficient durability once installed in power, therefore the House of Kalinga's hold on the throne was inherently precarious. On three occasions, the queen of Parākramabāhu, Lilāvatī, was raised to the throne out of desperation. The factional struggle and political instability attracted the attention of South Indian adventures bent on plunder, culminating in the devastating campaign of pillage under Māgha of Kalinga (1215–1236), claiming the inheritance of the kingdom through his kinsman who reigned before.

Māgha, a bigoted Hindu, persecuted Buddhists, despoiling the temples and giving away lands of the Sinhalese to his followers. His priorities in ruling were to extract as much as possible from the land and overturn as many of the traditions of Rajarata as possible. His reign saw the massive migration of the Sinhalese people to the south and west of Sri Lanka, and into the mountainous interior, in a bid to escape his power. Māgha's rule of 21 years and its aftermath are a watershed in the history of the island, creating a new political order. After his death in 1255 Polonnaruwa ceased to be the capital, Sri Lanka gradually decayed in power and from then on there were two, or sometimes three rulers existing concurrently. Parakramabahu VI of Kotte (1411–1466) would be the only other Sinhalese monarch to establish control over the whole island after this period. The Rajarata, the traditional location of the Sinhalese kingdom and Rohana, the previously autonomous subregion were abandoned. Two new centers of political authority emerged as a result of the fall of the Polonnaruwa kingdom.

In the face of repeated South Indian invasions the Sinhalese monarchy and people retreated into the hills of the wet zone, further and further south, seeking primarily security. The capital was abandoned and moved to Dambadeniya by Vijayabāhu III establishing the Dambadeniya era of the Sinhalese kingdom. A second poilitical center emerged in the north of the island where Tamil settlers from previous Indian incursions occupied the Jaffna Peninsula and the Vanni. (Note: The land between Anuradhapura and Jaffna) Many Tamil members of invading armies, mercenaries, joined them rather than returning to India with their compatriots. By the 13th century the Tamils too withdrew from the Vanni almost entirely into the Jaffna peninsula where an independent Tamil kingdom had been established.

== See also ==
- Mahavamsa
- Architecture of ancient Sri Lanka
- Sinhala Kingdom
- List of Sinhalese monarchs
