= Prehistory of Sri Lanka =

The prehistory of Sri Lanka covers the Palaeolithic, Mesolithic and early Iron Age of the country until the Pre Anuradhapura period in 543 BC.

There is evidence of Paleolithic (Homo erectus) people in Sri Lanka from about 300,000 BP and possibly even as early as 500,000 BP. There is strong evidence of prehistoric settlements in Sri Lanka by about 125,000 BP. Evidence of a transition between the Mesolithic and the Iron Age is scant.

Fluctuations in sea level led to Sri Lanka being linked to the Indian subcontinent from time to time over the past million years. The last such link occurred about 5000 BC.

== Overview ==
Periodization of Sri Lanka history:

Dates	Period	Period	Span (years)	Subperiod	Span (years)	Main government
300,000 BP	Prehistoric Sri Lanka	Stone Age	300,000		–	Unknown
~1000 BCE–543 BCE	Prehistoric Sri Lanka	Iron Age	457		–	Republic
543 BCE–437 BCE	Ancient Sri Lanka	Pre-Anuradhapura	106		–	Monarchy
437 BCE–463 CE	Ancient Sri Lanka	Anuradhapura	1454	Early Anuradhapura	900	Monarchy
463–691	Ancient Sri Lanka	Anuradhapura	1454	Middle Anuradhapura	228	Monarchy
691–1017	Post-classical Sri Lanka	Anuradhapura	1454	Late Anuradhapura	326	Monarchy
1017–1070	Post-classical Sri Lanka	Polonnaruwa	215	Chola conquest	53	Monarchy
1055–1196	Post-classical Sri Lanka	Polonnaruwa	215	High Polonnaruwa	141	Monarchy
1196–1232	Post-classical Sri Lanka	Polonnaruwa	215	Late Polonnaruwa	36	Monarchy
1232–1341	Post-classical Sri Lanka	Transitional	365	Dambadeniya	109	Monarchy
1341–1412	Post-classical Sri Lanka	Transitional	365	Gampola	71	Monarchy
1412–1592	Early Modern Sri Lanka	Transitional	365	Kotte	180	Monarchy
1592–1707	Early Modern Sri Lanka	Kandyan	223	Early Kandyan	115	Monarchy
1707–1760	Early Modern Sri Lanka	Kandyan	223	Middle Kandyan	53	Monarchy
1760–1815	Early Modern Sri Lanka	Kandyan	223	Late Kandyan	55	Monarchy
1815–1833	Modern Sri Lanka	British Ceylon	133	Post-Kandyan	18	Colonial monarchy
1833–1927	Modern Sri Lanka	British Ceylon	133	Colebrooke–Cameron Reforms era	94	Colonial monarchy
1927–1948	Modern Sri Lanka	British Ceylon	133	Donoughmore Reforms era	21	Colonial monarchy
1948–1972	Contemporary Sri Lanka	Sri Lanka since 1948	78	Dominion	24	Constitutional monarchy
1972–present	Contemporary Sri Lanka	Sri Lanka since 1948	78	Republic	54	Unitary semi-presidential constitutional republic

== Stone Age ==
The Stone Age had approximately existed from 125,000 years ago to 1800 BC minimum.

=== Palaeolithic ===
Findings at Iranamadu indicate that there were Paleolithic people in Sri Lanka as early as 300,000 BP. There is definite evidence of settlements by prehistoric people in Sri Lanka by about 125,000 BP. These people made tools of quartz and chert which are assignable to the Middle Palaeolithic period. The inhabitants could be found in 8 main areas in the land of Sri Lanka. They were namely,

1. Lowland Arid Zone
2. Lowland semi-arid region
3. Lowland dry zone
4. Lowland Intermediate Dry Zone
5. Mountain Dry Intermediate Zone
6. Lowland Intermediate Wet Zone
7. Wet mountain zone
8. Wet highland region

=== Mesolithic ===
The island appears to have been colonized by the Balangoda Man (named after the area where his remains were discovered) prior to 34,000 BP. They have been identified as a group of Mesolithic hunter-gatherers who lived in caves. Fa Hien Cave has yielded the earliest evidence (at c. 34,000 BP) of anatomically modern humans in South Asia.

Several of these caves including the well known Batadombalena and the Fa Hien Cave have yielded many artefacts that points to their being the first modern inhabitants of the island. There is evidence from Belilena that salt had been brought in from the coast earlier than 27,000 BP. In June 2020 research carried out by the Max Planck Institute, Griffith University in Australia, and the Department of Archaeology (Government of Sri Lanka), showed that occupants of the Fa-Hien Lena cave had developed bow and arrow technology 48,000 BP. This is the oldest use of this technology outside of Africa.

Several small granite tools of about 4 centimeters in length, earthenware and remnants of charred timber, and clay burial pots that date back to the Stone Age Mesolithic people who lived 8,000 years ago have been discovered during recent excavations around a cave at Warana Raja Maha Vihara and also in Kalatuwawa area.

The skeletal remains of dogs from Nilgala cave and from Bellanbandi Palassa, dating from the Mesolithic era, about 4500 BC, suggest that Balangoda People may have kept domestic dogs for driving game. The Sinhala Hound is similar in appearance to the Kadar Dog, the New Guinea Dog and the dingo. It has been suggested that these could all derive from a common domestic stock. It is also possible that they may have domesticated jungle fowl, pig, water buffalo and some form of Bos (possibly the ancestor of the Sri Lankan neat cattle which became extinct in the 1940s).

The Balangoda Man appears to have been responsible for creating Horton Plains, in the central hills, by burning the trees in order to catch game. However, evidence from the plains suggests the incipient management of oats and barley by about 15,000 BC.

=== Mesolithic–Iron Age transition ===
The transition in Sri Lanka from the Mesolithic to the Iron Age has not been adequately documented. A human skeleton found at Godavaya in the Hambantota district, provisionally dated back to 5000–3000 BC, was accompanied by tools of animal-bone and stone.

However, evidence from Horton Plains indicates the existence of agriculture by about 8000 BC, including herding of Bos and cultivation of oats and barley. Excavations in the cave of Dorawaka-kanda near Kegalle indicate the use about 4300 BC of pottery, together with stone stools, and possibly cereal cultivation.

Slag found at Mantai dated to about 1800 BC could indicate the knowledge of copper-working.

Cinnamon, which is native to Sri Lanka, was in use in Ancient Egypt in about 1500 BC, suggesting that there were trading links with the island, although the cinnamon could also have been from Kerala. It is possible that Biblical Tarshish was located on the island (James Emerson Tennent identified it with Galle).

== Iron Age ==
During the protohistoric period (1000-500 BCE) Sri Lanka was culturally united with southern India, and shared the same megalithic burials, pottery, iron technology, farming techniques and megalithic graffiti. This cultural complex spread from southern India along with Dravidian clans such as the Velir, prior to the migration of Prakrit speakers.

A large settlement appears to have been founded before 900 BC at the site of Anuradhapura, where signs of an Iron Age culture have been found. The size of the settlement was about 15 hectares at that date, but it expanded to 50 ha, to 'town' size within a couple of centuries. A similar site has been discovered at Aligala in Sigiriya.

The earliest chronicles the Dipavamsa and Mahavamsa say that the island was inhabited by tribes of Yakkhas (demons), Nagas (cobras) and devas (gods).

Pottery that was claimed to date back to the early 4th century BCE was found at Anuradhapura, bearing Brāhmī script (among the earliest extant examples of the script) and non-Brahmi writing, which may have arisen through contact with Semitic trading scripts from West Asia. This has been disputed by leading epigraphist Harry Falk who states that regional chauvinism is to blame for the claims of a pre-Ashokan Brahmi script. He cites flaws in carbon dating calibration curves and stratification techniques for these pre Ashokan dates.

The emergence of new forms of pottery at the same time as the writing, together with other artifacts such as red glass beads, indicate a new cultural impulse, possibly an invasion from North India. The Brahmi writing appears to be in Indo-Aryan Prakrit and is almost identical to the Asokan script dated to the 3rd century BC; corroborating the view that Indo-Aryan was pre-dominant from the earliest literate phase in Sri Lanka. Also Some Tamil Brahmi Inscriptions are also found in this period.

== See also ==
- History of Sri Lanka
- Prehistoric Asia
- South Asian Stone Age
