= Abhaya of Tambapanni =

King of Upatissa Nuwara (Sri Lanka) from 474 to 454 BC

Abhaya
- King of Upatissa Nuwara
- Reign: 474 BC – 454 BC
- Predecessor: Panduvasdeva
- Successor: Tissa
- House: Vijaya
- Father: Panduvasdeva
- Mother: Queen Princess Buddhakachchana

Abhaya (Sinhala:අභය) was king of Upatissa Nuwara (modern-day Sri Lanka) from 474 BC to 454 BC. He succeeded his father Panduvasdeva after being chosen by his siblings as the oldest among them to be the next monarch of Upatissa Nuwara. He was succeeded by his brother, Tissa.

Later, he was named to the post of `Nagaraguttika’ (Guardian of the City) and the government for the night-time was handed over to him by his nephew Pandukabhaya.

== See also ==
- List of Sri Lankan monarchs
- Mahavamsa
- History of Sri Lanka
- Place names in Sri Lanka

Abhaya of Tambapanni Vijaya Born: ? ? Died: ? ?
Regnal titles
Preceded by Panduvasdeva	King of Upathissa Nuwara; 474 BC – 454 BC	Succeeded by Tissa
