= Panduvasdeva =

Sri Lankan king of Upatissa Nuwara from 504 to 474 BC

Panduvasdeva පණ්ඩුවාසුදේව රජතුමා
- King of Upatissa Nuwara
- Reign: 504 BC – 474 BC
- Predecessor: Upatissa
- Successor: Abhaya
- Died: 474 BC
- Spouse: Princess Buddhakachchana
- Issue: Abhaya; Tissa; Uththiya; Asela; Vithaba; Rama; Siva of Girikanda; Matha; Maththakala; Unmadachithra
- House: Vijaya
- Father: Sumitta
- Mother: Princess of Madha

Panduvasudeva (Sinhala:පණ්ඩුවාසදේව) (died 474 BC) was King of Upatissa Nuwara (in modern-day Sri Lanka) from 504 BC to 474 BC. He was the first monarch of the Kingdom of Upatissa Nuwara and succeeded Upatissa, who reigned as regent. Panduvasudeva had ten sons, including Abhaya and Tissa and one daughter, Unmada Chitra. He was a nephew of Prince Vijaya.

Panduvasdeva Vijaya Born: ? ? Died: ? 474 BC
Regnal titles
Preceded by Upatissa	King of Upathissa Nuwara; 504 BC – 474 BC	Succeeded by Abhaya
