= Tambapaṇṇī =

Tambapanni is the district in Sri Lanka where Prince Vijaya landed after leaving Supparaka. Later on the capital was founded in Tambapanni and following that the whole island came to bear the same name.

== See also ==
- Kingdom of Tambapanni
