= Prince Tissa =

King of Upatissa Nuwara (Sri Lanka) from 454 to 437 BC

Tissa
- King of Upatissa Nuwara
- Reign: 454 BC – 437 BC
- Predecessor: Abhaya
- Successor: Pandukabhaya
- House: Vijaya
- Father: Panduvasdeva

Tissa (Sinhala:තිස්ස) was king of Upatissa Nuwara (modern-day Sri Lanka) from 454 BC to 437 BC. He succeeded his older brother Abhaya after his deposition. Appointed regent by his eight younger brothers, Tissa was to be consecrated king only after defeating his nephew Pandukabhaya. However, he was ultimately deposed by Pandukabhaya.

== See also ==
- List of Sri Lankan monarchs
- Mahavamsa
- History of Sri Lanka
- Place names in Sri Lanka

Prince Tissa Vijaya Born: ? ? Died: ? ?
Regnal titles
Preceded by Abhaya	King of Upathissa Nuwara; 454 BC – 437 BC	Succeeded by Pandukabhaya
