= Upatissa (regent) =

Sri Lankan king of Upatissa Nuwara from 505 to 504 BC

- King of Upatissa Nuwara
- Reign: 505 BC – 504 BC
- Predecessor: Vijaya
- Successor: Panduvasdeva
- Died: Tambapanni
- Issue: 10 sons and a daughter

Upatissa (Sinhala:උපතිස්ස) was purohita (Vedic priest) to King Vijaya of Sri Lanka. He built the city of Upatissa Nuwara which he named after himself. This became the second Sinhalese kingdom in Sri Lanka.

He was the King of Upatissa Nuwara for a short period after the death of Prince Vijaya until the arrival from India of the heir to the throne, King Panduvasdeva.

== See also ==
- List of Sri Lankan monarchs

Upatissa (regent) Monarchs of Sri Lanka Born: ? ? Died: ? ?
Regnal titles
Preceded by Vijaya	King of Upathissa Nuwara; 505 BC – 504 BC	Succeeded by Panduvasdeva
