= Upatissagāma =

Upatissagāma was the second capital of the Kingdom of Tambapanni, during the Pre Anuradhapura period of Sri Lanka. It was seven or eight miles further north of the previous capital Tambapaṇṇī, which was in present-day Puttalam. The city was established by Upatissa, a follower and senior minister of Vijaya.

During the end of his reign Vijaya, who was having trouble choosing a successor, so sent a letter to the city of his ancestors at Sinhapura, in order to invite his brother Sumitta to take over the throne. However Vijaya had died before the letter had reached its destination so the monarchy was succeeded by his chief minister Upatissa who acted as king for a year.

== See also ==
- Capital of Sri Lanka
- Pre Anuradhapura period
