= Udamadura Grama Niladhari Division =

Udamadura
- Grama Niladhari Division
- Interactive map of Udamadura
- Coordinates: 7.096225°N 80.919325°E
- Country: Sri Lanka
- Province: Central Province
- District: Nuwara Eliya District
- Divisional Secretariat: Walapane Divisional Secretariat
- Electoral District: Nuwara-Eliya Electoral District
- Polling Division: Walapane Polling Division

Area
  - Total: 1.34 km^{2} (0.52 sq mi)
- Elevation: 944 m (3,097 ft)

Population (2012)
  - Total: 544
  - Density: 406/km^{2} (1,050/sq mi)
- ISO 3166 code: LK-2309220

Udamadura

Udamadura Grama Niladhari Division is a Grama Niladhari Division of the Walapane Divisional Secretariat of Nuwara Eliya District of Central Province, Sri Lanka . It has Grama Niladhari Division Code 518.

Udamadura are located within, nearby or associated with Udamadura.

Udamadura is a surrounded by the Kalaganwatta, Ambanella, Galkadawela, Kosgolla, Udawela and Udamadura North Grama Niladhari Divisions.

== Demographics ==
=== Ethnicity ===
The Udamadura Grama Niladhari Division has a Sinhalese majority (100.0%) . In comparison, the Walapane Divisional Secretariat (which contains the Udamadura Grama Niladhari Division) has a Sinhalese majority (63.0%) and a significant Indian Tamil population (33.8%)

Ethnicity in Udamadura
1. Sinhalese (100.0%)
2. Other (0.00%)

=== Religion ===
The Udamadura Grama Niladhari Division has a Buddhist majority (100.0%) . In comparison, the Walapane Divisional Secretariat (which contains the Udamadura Grama Niladhari Division) has a Buddhist majority (62.7%) and a significant Hindu population (33.1%)

Religion in Udamadura
1. Buddhist (100.0%)
2. Other (0.00%)
