= Walapane =

Walapane වලපනේ வலபனை
- Town
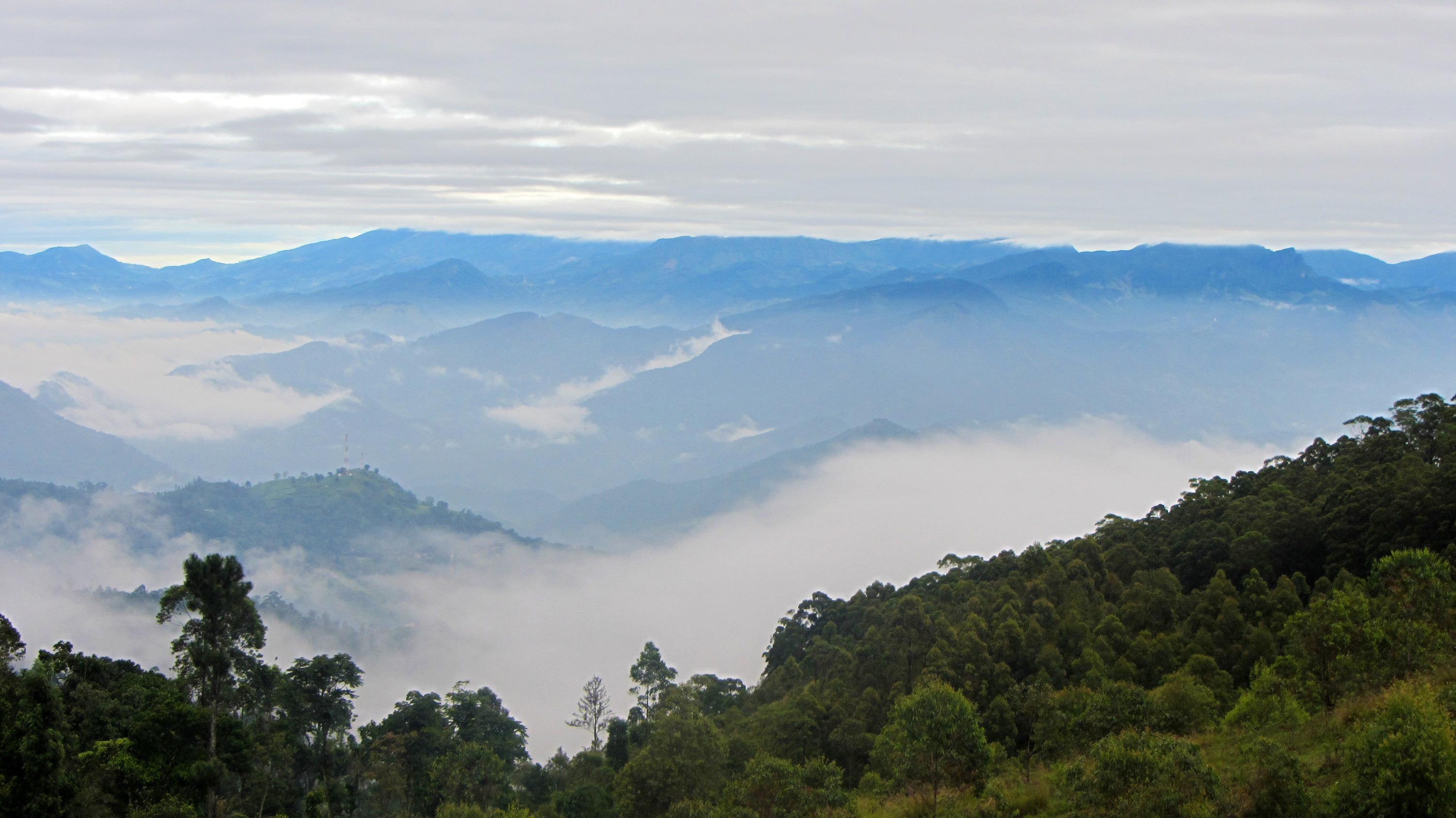
- View from Walapane.
- Interactive map of Walapane
- Coordinates: 7°20′N 80°45′E
- Country: Sri Lanka
- Division: Walapane
- Former seat: Walapane

Area
  - Total: 320 km^{2} (120 sq mi)

Gross Regional Product (2010)
  - Total: Rs 465 billion
  - Rank: 4th (9.6% of total)
- Time zone: UTC+05:30 (Sri Lanka)
- ISO 3166 code: LK-23
- Official Languages: Sinhala, Tamil, English

Walapane is a town located in Nuwara Eliya District of Sri Lanka. It is a high country area with many green mountains. It was called Wathtumulla in the past. The name Watumulla derived from the former tea factory which was located in the heart of the Walapane town and now demolished since the production of Wattumulla Plantation declined. Walapane is administered by the government of *Sri Lanka through *Walapane Divisional Secretariat.

== History ==
Walapane was a division controlled by ancient Kandy Kingdom.

== Geography ==
The province has an area of 320 km², a population of 103,152.

== Climate ==
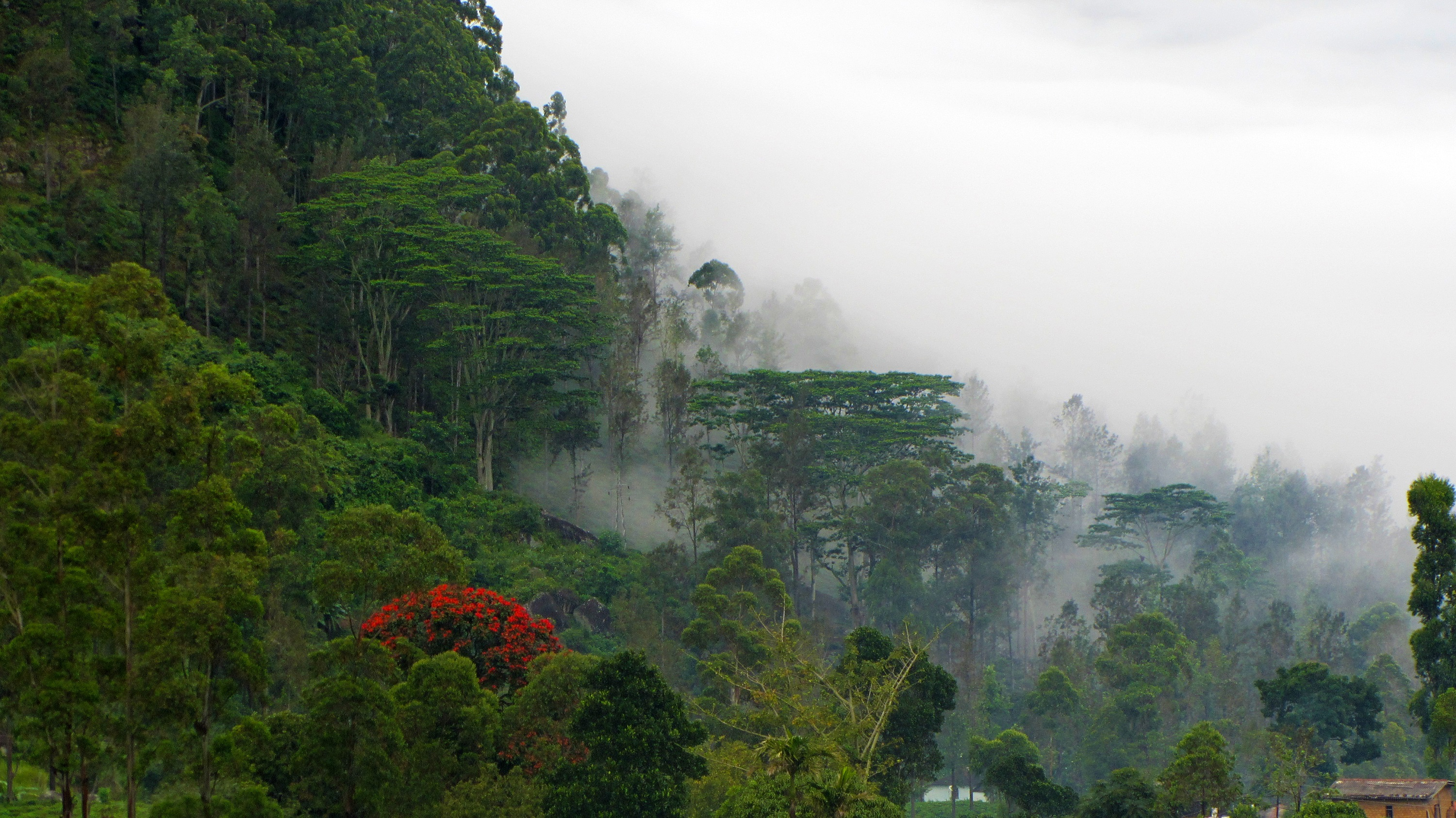
View from Walapane.

The climate is cool, Walapane is located above 910 metres above sea level, often have chilly nights. Some slopes are very wet, some places having almost 7000 mm of rain per year. Some slopes are parts of the mid-dry zone as it is receiving rain only from North-Eastern monsoon. The temperatures range from 24 °C to just 16 °C in Walapane. The highest mountains in Walapane is. The terrain is mostly mountainous, with deep valleys cutting into it. The two main mountain regions are the Pidurutalagala range.

== Demographics ==
The population is a mixture of Sinhalese, Tamil and the Moors. Many tea plantation workers are Indian Tamils, brought to Sri Lanka by the British in the 19th century.

=== Ethnicity ===
Ethnic group	Population	%
Sinhala		
Indian Tamil		
Sri Lankan Moor		
Sri Lankan Tamil		
Burger		
other		
Total		

== Administrative divisions ==
- Walapane Divisional Secretariat.

=== Divisional Secretariats ===
The districts of the Sri Lanka are divided into administrative sub-units known as divisional secretariats. These were originally based on the feudal counties, the korales and ratas. They were formerly known as 'D.R.O. Divisions' after the 'Divisional Revenue Officer'. Later the D.R.O.s became 'Assistant Government Agents' and the Divisions were known as 'A.G.A. Divisions'. Currently, the Divisions are administered by a 'Divisional Secretary', and are known as a 'D.S. Divisions'.

There are 36 divisional secretariats divided in Central Province, which are listed below, by district. There are 20 in Kandy District, 11 in Matale District and 5 in Nuwara Eliya District.

== Villages of Walapane ==
- Mahauwa
- Egodakanda
- Harasbedda
- Kumbalgamuwa
- Manelwala
- Rupaha
- Karandagolla
- Rasingolla
- Kumbukwella
- Udamadura
- Teripaha
- Madulla
- Weralla
- Napala
- Diggala

== Small Towns ==
- Walapane
- Ragala
- Nildandahinna
- Padiyapelella
- Udapussallawa

== See also ==
- Provinces of Sri Lanka
- Districts of Sri Lanka
- Tea production in Sri Lanka

== Maps ==
- Searchable Map of Sri Lanka
