= Sri Sumangala National College =

- ශ්‍රී සුමංගල ජාතික පාසල; ஶ்ரீ சுமங்கல தேசிய கல்லூரி

Location
- Nildandahinna; Sri Lanka
- Coordinates: 7°4′44″N 80°53′30″E

Information
- School type: National
- Motto: Sinhala: නොනැවතී ඉදිරියට; Nonawathi Idiriyata (Keep moving forward)
- Religious affiliation: Buddhist
- Established: c. 1864
- Founder: A.D. Ished Siriwardhana
- School district: Nuwara Eliya
- Principal: Kapila Aththanayake
- Grades: 1-13
- Gender: Mixed
- Age range: 6 to 19
- Enrollment: 2500
- Colors: Maroon and Yellow
- Nickname: S.N.C.
- Website: Sri Sumangala National College

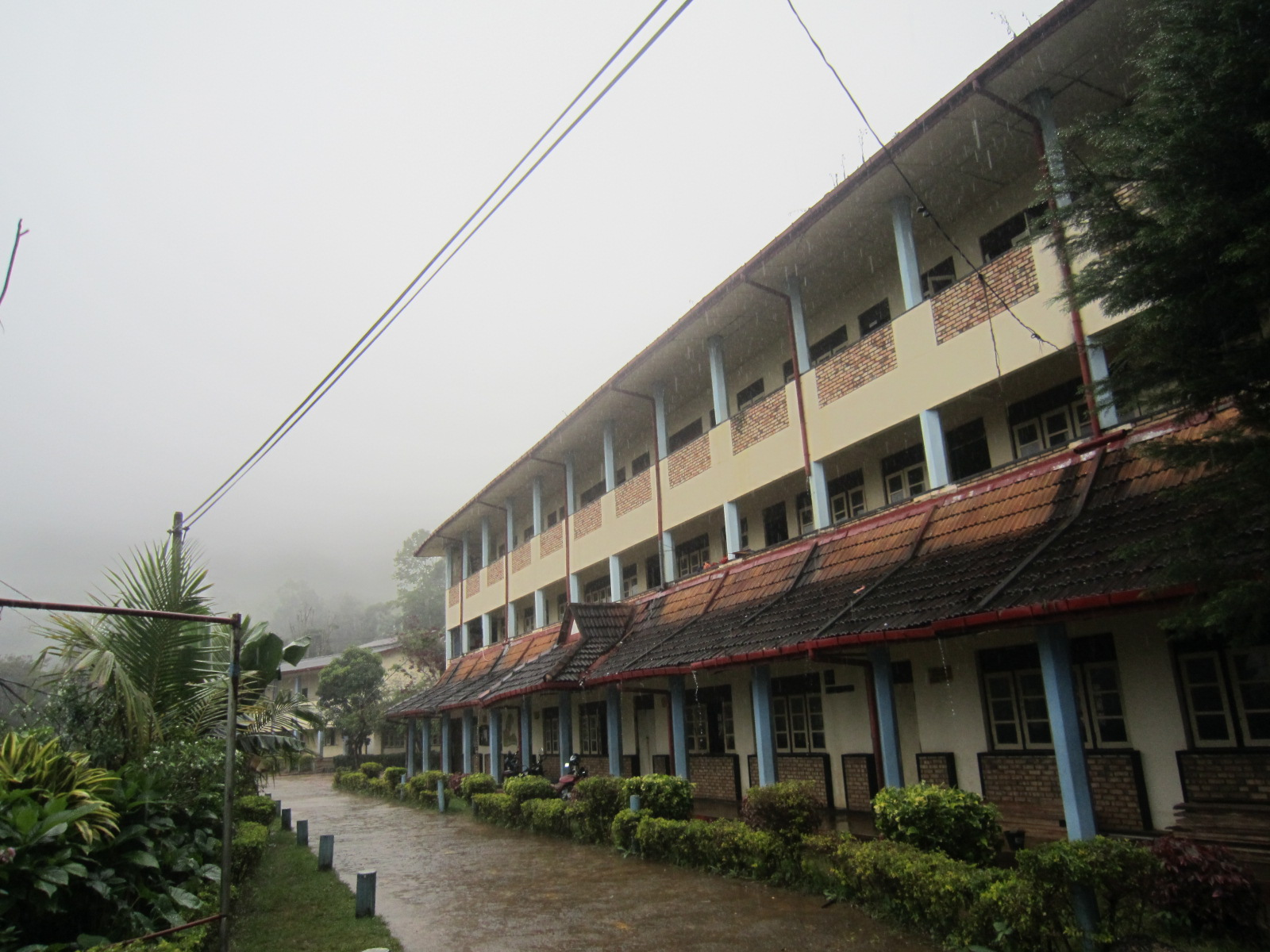
Main Hall of Sri Sumangala National College

Sri Sumangala National College (Sinhala: ශ්‍රී සුමංගල ජාතික පාසල), in Nildandahinna, Nuwara Eliya District, Sri Lanka, was founded in 1864. It is a national school with a bilingual education program and belongs to Walapane Education zone.

== History ==
Sri Sumangala National College was founded in 1864 with A. D. Ished Siriwardana as the first principal. The school was started with a very few number of students as a mixed school with only one building and was named Nildandahinna Royal School. Afterwards, the school was divided into two schools, a separate school for girls with Mrs Meegasdeniya as the first principal.

At present, the school roll is approximately 3,000 students in all grades.

== Sports achievements ==
The Taekwondo team of Sri Sumangala National School in Nildandahinna, Walapane, won the Inter-School Taekwondo championship - 2017, making history as the only school to win four years in a row.

The Sumangala team swept the board at the national championships this year with three gold medals, six silver medals and 13 bronze medals. Sumangala also won the overall championship title in 2014, 2015 and 2016.

== Houses ==
The college has three houses, named after kings of Sri Lanka.

House	Named after
Vijaya	King Vijaya
Gemunu	King Gemunu
Parakum	King Parakramabahu I

== Name history ==
Year	Name
1864 to ?	Nildandahinna Royal School
? to 1982	Sri Sumangala Maha Vidyalaya
1982 to 1993	Sri Sumangala Madya Maha Vidyalaya
1993 to date	Sri Sumangala National College
