= Hiranya =

Hiranya ("gold" in Sanskrit) may refer to:

== Given name ==
- Hiranya Peiris (born 1974), British astrophysicist
- Hiranya Herath (born 1986), Sri Lankan lawyer and politician
- Hiranyamayee Lama, Bhutanese politician, elected to the Tshogdu in 1979

== Other ==
- Hiranya, a 2009 album by Merzbow
- Hiranyakeshi river, a tributary of the Ghataprabha River in India
- Hiranya (film), a 2024 Indian Kannada-language action drama film

== See also ==
- Hiranyagarbha ("golden womb/egg"), a term for the source of universal creation in Vedic philosophy
  - Brahma, also known as Hiranyagarbha, Hindu god of creation who was born from the egg
- Hiranyagarbha (donation), an ancient Indian ceremony of donating a golden vessel
- Hiranyakashipu ("clothed in gold"), an Asura mentioned in the Puranas
- Hiranyaksha ("golden-eyed"), an Asura
- Hiranya Varna Mahavihar ("Golden Great Monastery"), a Buddhist vihara in Patan, Nepal
