= Sinhapura =

Capital of the legendary Indian king Sinhabahu

Sinhapura ("Lion City" for Sanskrit; IAST: Siṃhapura) was the capital of the legendary Indian king Sinhabahu. It has been mentioned in the Buddhist legends about Prince Vijaya. The name is also transliterated as Sihapura or Singhapura.

The location of Sinhapura is disputed with some scholars stating the city was located in eastern India. The city is linked to the origin of the Sinhalese people and Sinhalese Buddhist ancient texts.

== The legend ==
According to Mahavamsa, the king of Vanga (historic Bengal region) married the daughter of the king of Kalinga (present-day Odisha). The couple had a daughter named Suppadevi, who was prophesied to copulate with the king of beasts. As an adult, Princess Suppadevi left Vanga to seek an independent life. She joined a caravan headed for Magadha, but it was attacked by Sinha ("lion") in a forest of the Lala (or Lada) region. The Mahavamsa mentions the "Sinha" as an animal. Lala is variously identified as Rarh (an area in the Vanga-Kalinga region), or as Lata (a part of the present-day Gujarat).

Suppadevi fled during the attack, but encountered Sinha again. Sinha was attracted to her, and she also caressed him, thinking of the prophecy. Sinha kept Suppadevi locked in a cave, and had two children with her: a son named Sinhabahu (or Sihabahu; "lion-armed") and a daughter named Sinhasivali (or Sihasivali). When the children grew up, Suppadevi escaped with them to Vanga. They met a general who happened to be a cousin of Suppadevi, and later married her. Meanwhile, Sinha started ravaging villages in an attempt to find his missing family. The King of Vanga announced a reward for anyone who could kill Sinha. Sinhabahu killed his own father to claim the reward. By the time Sinhabahu returned to the capital, the King of Vanga had died. Sinhabahu was declared the new king by the ministers, but he later handed over the kingship to his mother's husband, the general. He went back to his birthplace in Lala, and founded the city of Sinhapura.

Sinhabahu married his sister Sinhasivali, and the couple had 32 sons in form of 16 pairs of twins. Vijaya was their eldest son, followed by his twin Sumitta. Vijaya and his followers were expelled from Sinhapura for their violent deeds against the citizens. During their exile, they reached the present-day Sri Lanka, where they found the Kingdom of Tambapanni. Meanwhile, in Sinhapura, Sumitta succeeded his father as the king. Before an heirless Vijaya died in Lanka, he sent a letter to Sumitta, asking him to come to Lanka and govern the new kingdom. Sumitta was too old to go to Lanka, so he sent his youngest son Panduvasdeva instead.

== Identification ==
Mahavamsa mentions that Sinhapura was founded in Lala, but does not mention the exact location of Lala, according to some scholars, the "Lala region" is actually the present-day Rarh region of Bengal, which was referred to as Lala in the past. Scholars who believe the legend of Prince Vijaya to be semi-historical have tried to identify the legendary Sinhapura with several modern places in India.

According to one theory, Sinhapura was located in Bengal modern day Singur region. Some scholars also suggest it may have been in Kalinga present-day Odisha, Jharkhand or the northern part of Andhra Pradesh. A city named Simhapura (another variant of "lion city") was the capital of Kalinga region during Mathara, Pitrubhakta and Vasistha dynasties. The inscriptions of three Kalinga kings – Candavarman, Umavarman and Ananta Saktivarman – were issued from Simhapura. Ananta Saktivarman's inscription is dated approximately to the 5th century CE on paleographic grounds. A Sanskrit-language plate inscription, also dated approximately to 5th century CE, mentions that it was issued by a vassal king named Satrudamanadeva from the Simhapura city. The inscription was found at Pedda Dugam, a place in Jalumuru mandal of Srikakulam district, Andhra Pradesh. Simhapura was the capital of a kingdom in Kalinga region in as late as the 12th century CE. The inscriptions of the Sri Lankan king Nissanka Malla state that he was born in Sinhapura of Kalinga in 1157/8 CE, and that he was a descendant of Vijaya. However, his records are considered to be boastful exaggerations.

R. C. Majumdar mentions that the Kalinga capital Simhapura and Sinhapura of Mahavamsa may have been same, but "the whole story is too legendary to be considered seriously". Even those who identify Sinhapura with Simhapura of Kalinga differ in opinion about its exact location. One source identifies the ancient city with the Singupuram village near Srikakulam in Andhra Pradesh. Another source identifies Sinhapura with Singhpur town near Jajpur in present-day Odisha.

Manmath Nath Das points out that according to Mahavamsa, Lala (and therefore, Sinhapura) was located on the way from Vanga (present-day Bengal) to Magadha (present-day Bihar). If Mahavamsa is correct, Sinhapura could not have been located in today's Odisha or Andhra Pradesh, because these places lie to the south of Bengal, away from Bihar. He, therefore, concludes that the Sinhapura of Mahavamsa was different from the capital city mentioned in records of Kalinga's rulers: it was probably located in the present-day Chota Nagpur area. S. Krishnaswami Aiyangar also believed that Lala and Sinhapura were located on the road connecting Vanga to Magadha, an area being either a part of or bordering to Kalinga.

Historians such as A. L. Basham and Senarath Paranavithana believe that the Lala kingdom was situated far away from the Vanga-Kalinga region, in present-day Gujarat. According to them, Sinhapura was located in present-day Sihor.

According to Hem Chandra Raychaudhuri, Sinhapura was in the Rarh region of Vanga. He identifies it with the present-day Singur in West Bengal.

Other scholars claim the city was located in Southeast Asia. Paranavitana indirectly claimed the city was located in Malaya while Rohanadheera claimed the city was Sing Buri, close to the city of Lopburi, which was located within the Khmer Empire at the time, later ruled by the Thai kingdoms.
