= Kuveni =

6th-century BC legendary Yakshini queen in Sri Lanka

- Queen of Lanka
- Successor: Vijaya
- Spouse: Vijaya
- Issue: Jeevahatta; Disala

Kuveni (කුවේණි/குவேணி, Pali: Kuveṇī) or Kuvanna (Pali: Kuvaṇṇā), also known as Sesapati or Leelavati, was a Yakshini queen in Sri Lanka mentioned in the ancient Pali chronicles Mahavamsa and Dipavamsa of the Sinhalese people. The primary source for her life-story is the Mahavamsa. She is venerated as Maha Loku Kiriammaleththo by the Veddas. Other names for her varying with Veddas habitats are Indigolle Kiriamma, Unapane Kiriamma, Kande Kiriamma, Divas Kiriamma, Wellasse Kiriamma, Kukulapola Kiriamma and Bili Kiriamma.

Kuveni was the wife of Vijaya, Sri Lanka’s first recorded legendary king, and together they had two children: a son, Jīvahattha, and a daughter, Dipellā. According to the genesis myth of the Sinhalese people, as recorded in the Mahāvaṃsa, the Veddas—the island’s indigenous population—are said to be descended from Kuveni’s children. Kuveni herself is described as a Pandyan princess and a descendant of the rākṣasas mentioned in the Ramayana, including Ravana, who also resided in Lanka.

According to Dayananda Binaragama, another prevalent legend about Kuveni among the Veddas is that she is the elder sister of deity Saman. For the Veddas, Devas too were and are another living tribe.

== Legend ==
According to legend, 2,500 years ago, the demon queen Kuveni ruled Sri Lanka. According to the Mahavamsa, Vijaya's arrival in Sri Lanka is said to have coincided with the passing away of the Buddha. Indeed, the first 'person' that Vijaya supposedly encounters on the island is the God Sumana Saman, who is charged by the ailing Buddha with looking after Vijaya and his descendants.

When Prince Vijaya landed on Tambapanni (5th century BC) with his seven hundred followers, they saw a dog. Vijaya's men, surmising that 'Only where there is a village are dogs to be found', followed the creature, only to come upon the Queen of the Yakkhas, Kuveni. Though the protection of Suman Saman prevented Kuveni from devouring the hapless man, it did not prevent her from hurling him - and all of Vijaya's other companions - into a chasm.

Vijaya eventually comes upon Kuveni and threatens her with death unless she releases his men. When this is done, Kuveni supplies them with food and clothing, and, assuming the lovely form of a sixteen-year-old maiden, seduces Vijaya. Then, in a complete reversal of her allegiances, she states that she 'will bestow Kingship on my Lord (Vijaya)' and thus 'all the Yakkhas must be slain, for (else) the Yakkhas will slay me, for it was through me that men have taken up their dwelling (in Lanka)'. This Vijaya goes on to do, vanquishing the Yakkhas and driving them from the island, all the time with Kuveni at his side.

Though Kuveni bears him two children, a son and a daughter, Vijaya eventually rejects her with the words 'Go now, dear one, leaving the two children behind; men are ever in fear of superhuman beings'. Despite begging Vijaya not to send her away, a broken-hearted Kuveni eventually leaves the palace, taking the two children despite being ordered not to. Kuveni was killed by her relatives when she went back to them to ask for help, leaving the two children in the forest glades of Bambawa of the North West region in Sri Lanka. And when the mother did not return they trekked towards Sabaragamuwa.

An alternative tale is that Kuveni flung herself from Yakdessa Gala, imploring the Gods to curse Vijaya for his cruelty - which they do by preventing any of Vijaya's children from ever sitting on the throne of Rajarata. 'Vijaya's curse' is held by some to still hold sway over Sri Lanka's troubled politics.

== Palace of Kuveni ==
Ruins of the palace of Kuveni can be found inside Wilpattu National Park Sri Lanka. There is no archaeological or literary evidence for this claim.

== See also ==
- List of monarchs of Sri Lanka
- Mahavamsa
- History of Sri Lanka
- Place names in Sri Lanka
- Vedda people

== Sources ==
- The curse and sublimation of Kuveni
- The first battle for freedom
