= Renuka Herath =

Sri Lankan politician

Hon. Renuka Herath Member of Parliament
- රේණුකා හේරත් ரேணுகா ஹேரத்
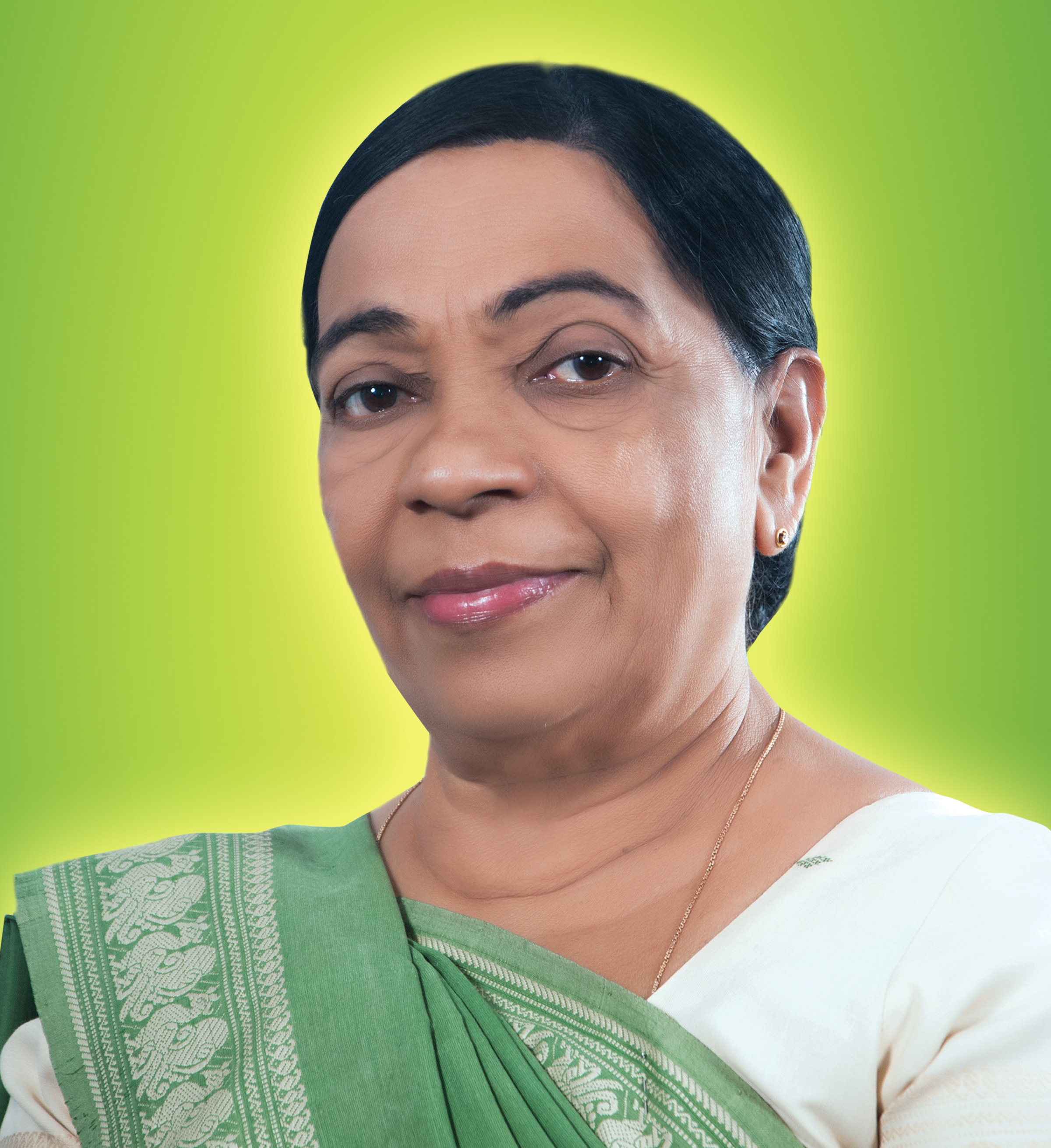

Member of Parliament for Nuwara Eliya District
- In office 1989–2000
- In office 2006–2010

Personal details
- Born: 7 September 1945 Wewakale, Walapane
- Died: 13 March 2017 (aged 71)
- Party: United National Party
- Other political affiliations: United National Front
- Spouse: Wimal Sisira Bandara Ranaweera
- Children: Hiranya Herath
- Education: Padiyapelalla Junior School, Poramadulla Central College
- Occupation: Politician
- Known for: Minister of Health

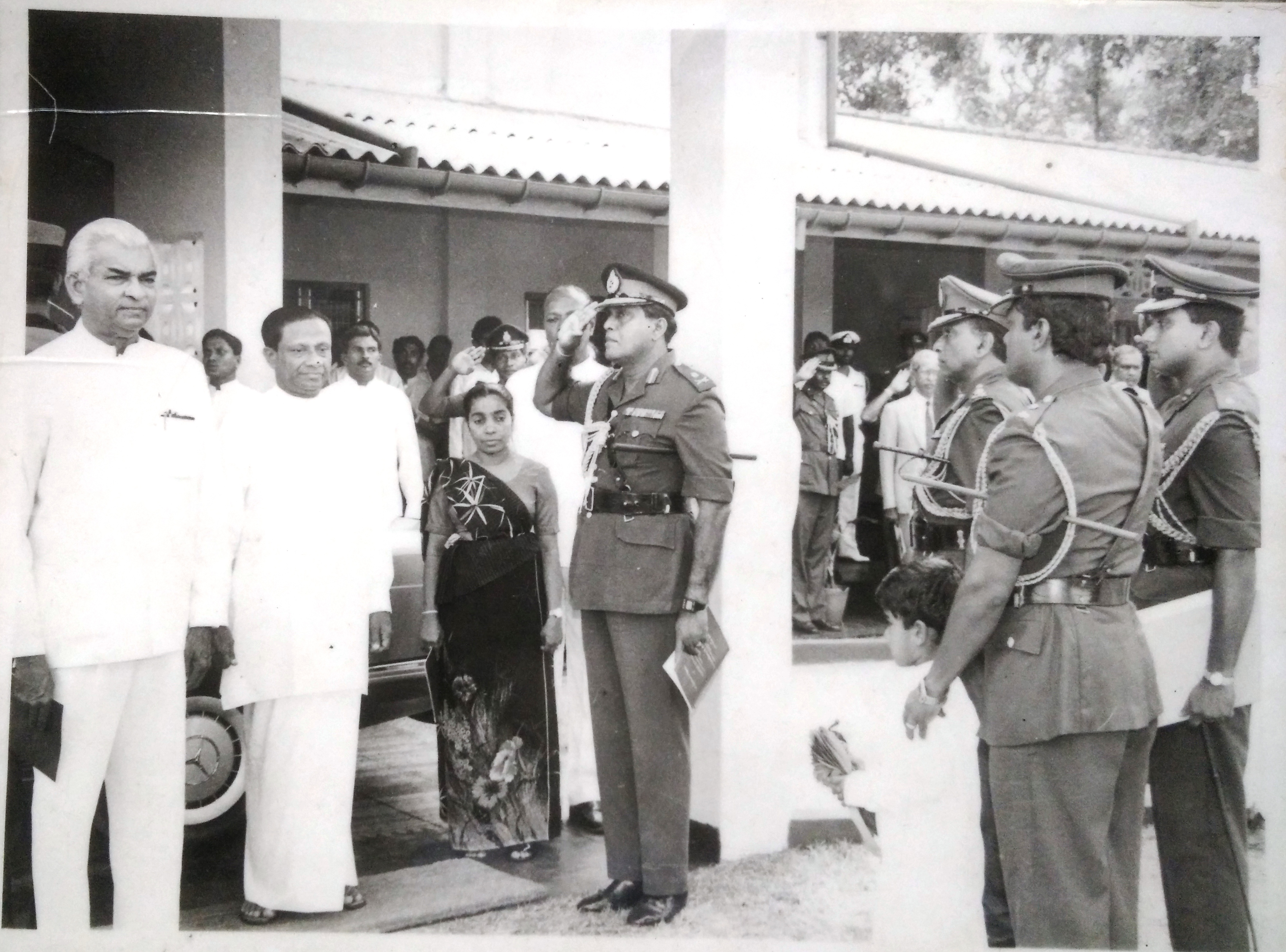

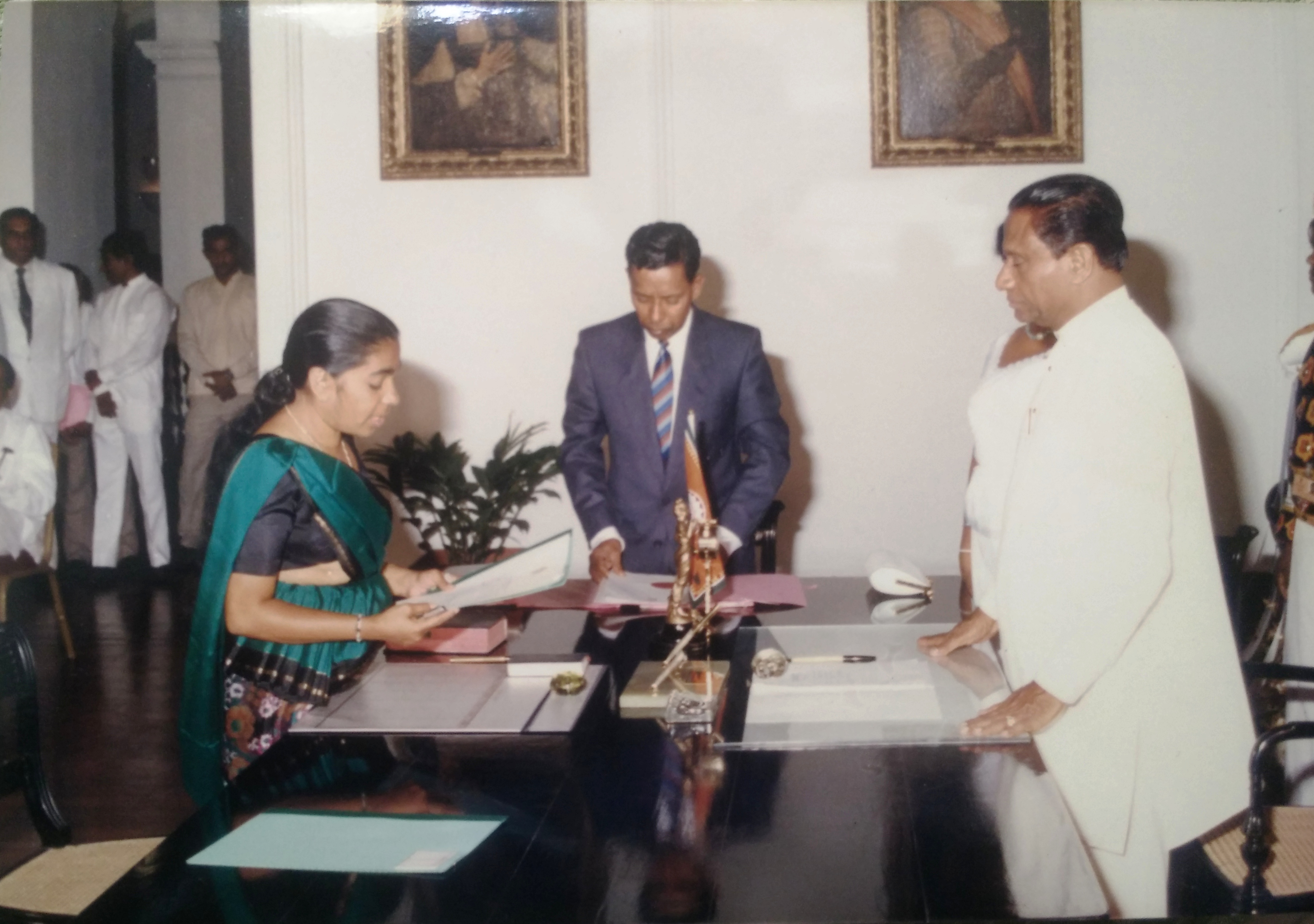

Dunuthilaka Mudiyanselage Renuka Menike Herath, commonly known as Renuka Herath (Sinhala: රේණුකා හේරත්, Tamil language: ரேணுகா ஹேரத், Born 7 September 1945 – 13 March 2017), was a prominent Sri Lankan politician and a member of the Parliament of Sri Lanka. She was the Health Minister under President Ranasinghe Premadasa. Renuka Herath was the opposition leader of the Central Provincial Council when she died.

During her tenure as the Minister of Health, while there was a tremendous amount of improvement to the healthcare system, it was also a time when no strikes in the healthcare service sector were allowed to cause inconvenience the public. She was active in politics up until she died in 2017.

== Career ==
Renuka Herath was a member of the UNP and came into politics by contesting in 1977 from her native Walapane electorate in Nuwara-Eliya district. She went on to win her first election and became a district minister.

In 1988, she was appointed as the deputy minister of cultural affairs. During President Ranasinghe Premadasa’s regime, she was the Minister of Health and women’s affairs. It was during her tenure in office that a major development in infrastructure and public service sector and uplift the quality of life for the people in Walapane and Nuwara-Eliya.
