= Osariya =

Traditional dress of the Sinhalese people

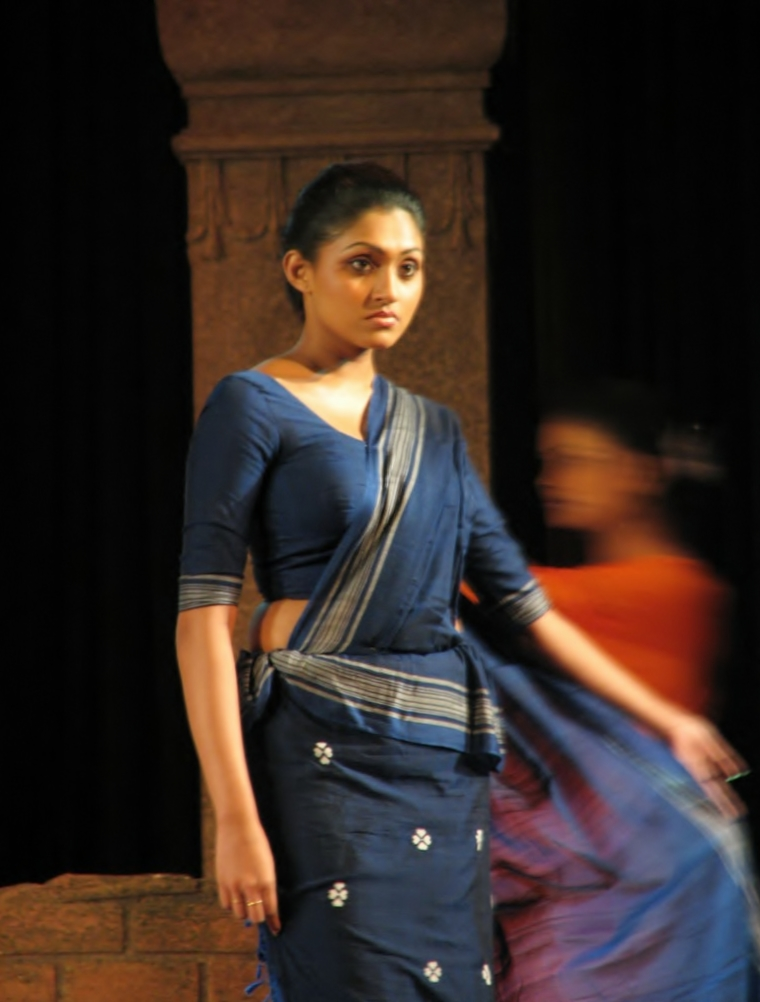
- A Sinhalese woman wearing a type of Osariya
- Material: Cotton
- Place of origin: Sri Lanka
- Introduced: Early 20th Century

The Osariya (Sinhala: ඔසරිය) or also known as the Kandyan dress is the traditional dress of the Sinhalese people of Sri Lanka and is considered as the National dress of Sri Lanka. This dress originated from the Kandyan Sinhalese people of the Kandyan kingdom of Sri Lanka and was worn by the Upper class Sinhalese women of the Kandyan period.

== Origin ==
The Osariya dress originated from the Kandyan Sinhalese of the Kandyan kingdom Its influences are debated among Scholars. It is believed to have influences from the Nayake dynasty of the Kandyan kingdom which gave the final form for the Osariya dress.

Another theory is that the influences from Mainland Southeast Asia and South India with the Kandyan traditional dress of that time gave origin to the Osariya.

== Style and Material ==
Osariya is a form of sari with a frill at the waist consists of a full blouse which covers the midriff completely, and is partially tucked in at the front with puffed sleeves.

Osariya is worn at different occasions such as going to work or weddings and the Osariya can greatly differ depending the occasion.

== Nationalization and History ==
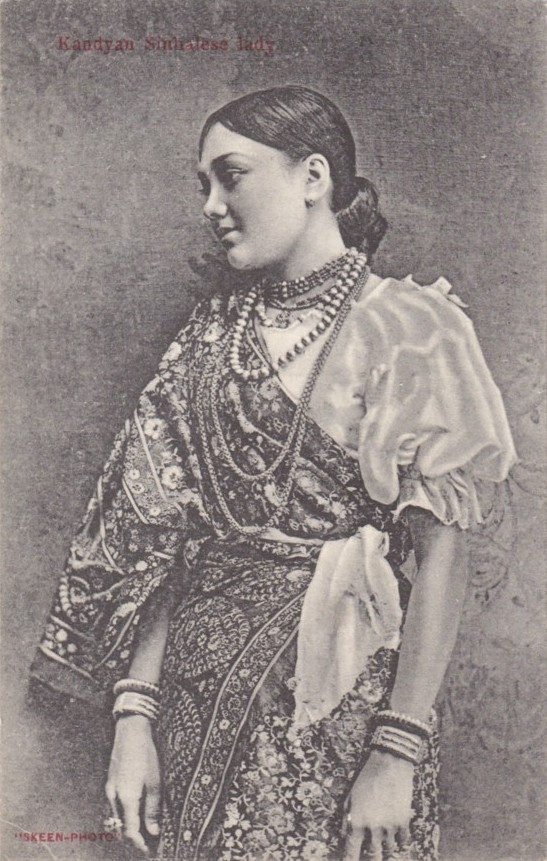
Sinhalese woman wearing the Osariya (1895)

Authenticity was Kandyan.

Anagarika Dharmapala’s declaration that for the ideal woman ‘a proper blouse should cover the breast, stomach and back completely and a cloth ten riyans [cubits] longshould be worn as Osariya or saree was influenced by Victorian morality.He likewise rejected the Western combination of hat, comb, collar, tie,banian(singlet), shirt, waistcoat, coat, trousers, cloth socks, and shoes for men.
