= Hiranya Herath =

Hiranya Herath Member of Pradeshiya Sabha
- හිරණ්‍යා හේරත් ஹிரன்யா ஹேரத்

Opposition Group Leader, Walapane Pradeshiya Sabha
- Constituency: Walapane, Nuwara Eliya

Personal details
- Born: 18 July 1986 (age 40) Walapane
- Citizenship: Sri Lanka
- Party: Samagi Jana Balawegaya
- Other political affiliations: United National Party
- Parent: Renuka Herath (mother)
- Education: BA in International Relations, LLB
- Alma mater: Ladies College, Colombo
- Occupation: Attorney at Law
- Profession: Politician

Hiranya Herath commonly known as Hiranya Herath (Sinhala: හිරණ්‍යා හේරත්, Tamil: ஹிரன்யா ஹேரத்; born 18 July 1986) is an Attorney at Law and a politician in the district of Nuwara Eliya, Sri Lanka. She is the only child of the late Renuka Herath a prominent politician and former Health Minister of Sri Lanka. Hiranya Herath was appointed as the UNP organizer of the Walapane electorate in November 2017.

== Education ==
She completed her secondary education at Ladies College Colombo. Then went on to complete a BA in International Relations at Monash University and an LLB from the University of London. She is at present an attorney at law.

== Career ==
In her 2 years as Walapane organizer for the UNP, she successfully championed the allocation of funds and completion of over 191 rural roads, over 50 places of worship including Buddhist temples, Hindu Kovils, and Mosques. There have also been multiple drinking water projects, grants for over 200 sanitation facilities for low-income households.

In the 2019 presidential election, Hiranya lead the campaign for the current leader of the Opposition Hon. Sajith Premadasa in the Walapane electorate ( a Sinhala Buddhist majority electorate). Hon. Sajith Premadasa went on to win the electorate for New Democratic Front against the SLPP. She oversaw an increase of votes (to 33,900) from the 23,500 votes gained by the UNP in the 2018 local government elections.

She was one of the first community leaders to respond at the landslide in Walapane (on 1 December 2019) leading the recovery effort and supporting the affected people.

Hiranya Herath was one of the first members of the UNP to publicly support an alliance led by Hon. Sajith Premadasa at the 2020 general elections following a UNP Central Committee decision to contest the election through an alliance.
