= Dewa people of Sri Lanka =

Dewa people were one of the four main tribes (Dewa, Yaksha, Naga, Raksha) of ancient Sri Lanka who founded the coalition of Sinhalese nationality. Sinhalese people (Sinhala: සිංහල ජනතාව, romanized: Sinhala Janathāva) are an ethnic group of the island of Sri Lanka. They were historically known as Hela people (Sinhala: හෙළ), Ceylonese islanders, and Sinhalese islanders. They constitute about 75% of the Sri Lankan population and number greater than 16.2 million. The Sinhalese identity is based on language, cultural heritage and nationality. The Sinhalese people speak Sinhala, an insular Indo-Aryan language, and are predominantly Theravada Buddhists, although a minority of Sinhalese follow branches of Christianity and other religions.

== A few prominent members of the Deva community in Sri Lanka ==
Wansapurna Dewage David, alias Gongalegoda Banda (a.k.a. Peliyagoda David) (13 March 1809 – 1 December 1849 ) was the leader of the Matale rebellion in 1848, pretender to the throne of Kandy and a national hero of Sri Lanka. Gongalegoda Banda led the protest march regarding unjustifiable taxes which was held on 6 July 1848 near the Kandy Kachchery. The rebellion was the first major uprising against the British since the Uva Rebellion in 1818. The anti-colonial movement on the island in 1848 was led by leaders such as Gongalegoda Banda, Puran Appu, Dingi Rala who were supported by many of the local people.

Another character from Dewa caste in the British colonial period was Duenuge Edward Henry Pedris[3] (Sinhala: හෙන්රි පේද්රිස්; 16 August 1888 – 7 July 1915) was a Ceylonese militia officer and a prominent socialite. Pedris was executed for treason by the 17th Punjab Regiment of the British Indian Army under martial law during the 1915 Sinhalese-Muslim riots. Convicted in a three-day Field General Court Martial under the terms of the Army Act, by passing the local legal system, his execution was viewed as unjust by the local population and a warning to local leaders. It hastened the movement toward independence, providing motivation and a martyr for those who pioneered the movement

Gongalegoda Banda (Wansapurna Dewage David alias Gongale Goda Banda) [(a.k.a. Peliyagoda David) (13 March 1809 – 1 December 1849 )]- [Henry Pedris (Duenuge Edward Henry Pedris) (Sinhala: හෙන්රි පේද්රිස්; (16 August 1888 – 7 July 1915)] [Cyril Mathew (Kaluwa Dewage Siril Mathew) Former Cabinet Minister; JR Jayawardana's government (September 30, 1912, October 17, 1989)] [Anura Bastian a Sri Lankan politician. He was a former Deputy Minister of Defence and Member of Parliament (1978 - 1989).] [Athula Nimalasiri Jayasinghe (Wijayamuni Devage Athula Nimalasiri Jayasinghe or Loku Athula) (1944 - 2014) Deputy Minister of Power and Energy] [Ananda Kularatne Minister of Southern Region Development (2001–2004)] [Semage Salman Kulatileke Member of the Sri Lanka Parliament (1970–1972)] [Wijeyadasa Rajapakshe Minister of Education and Higher Education and many ministerial posts] [Champika Premadasa (Abathenna Devayalage Champika Premadasa) (November 4, 1948) Minister of Industry, Commerce, State Minister of Industry and Commerce 2015-2019 Bandula Warnapura first Sri Lankan test cricket captain] [K. D. Lalkantha - Former parliamentarian and unian leader of JVP] [Nanda Mathew (Kaluwa Dewage Nanda Mathew) was former Governor of Uva province (held the office from 2003 to 2015)] [A.G. Sirisena- Provincial Council Member of central Province from SLFP] [N. D. N. P. Jayasinghe - Former parliamentarian from JVP and Provincial Council Member of central Province from JNP (SLFP Alliance)] [Samson Rajapaksa (Diyunuge Samson Rajapaksa) JP (Industrialist *DSI Samson Group)] [Dharma Sri Munasinghe Sinhala radio playwright and film screenwriter and director] [Douglas Ranasinghe An actor in Sri Lankan cinema, theater, and television] [Neville Karunatilake, Former Governor of the Central Bank of Sri Lanka] [1]

== See also ==
- Sinhalese people
- Sri Lankan Tamil people
- Balangoda Man
