= Sinhalese people =

Native ethnic group of Sri Lanka

සිංහල ජනතාව
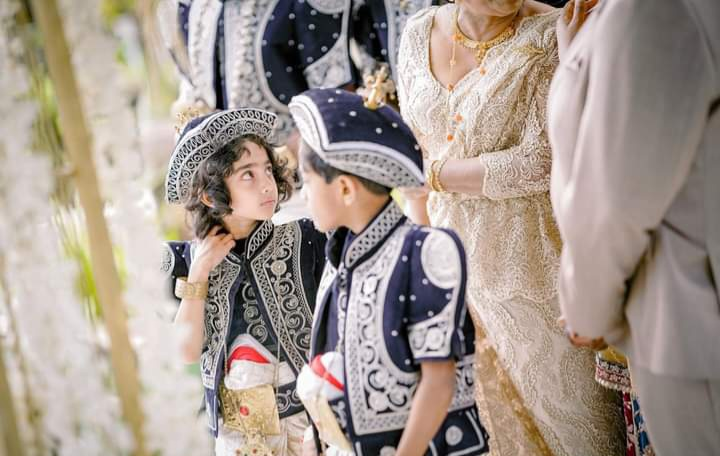
- Sinhalese children in folk costume

Total population
- c. 17 million

Regions with significant populations
- Sri Lanka: 15.1 million (74.9%) (2012)
- United Arab Emirates: ≈150,000 (2025)
- Italy: 108,069 (2022)
- Australia: 58,166 (2021)
- United States: ≈41,000 (2016)
- Canada: 33,050 (2021)
- Singapore: ≈17,000
- United Kingdom: 14,731 (2021)
- New Zealand: 9,171 (2018)
- India: ≈5,300
- Malaysia: ≈4,700

Languages
- Sinhala

Religion
- Majority: Theravada Buddhism (93%); Minority: Christianity (7%)

Related ethnic groups
- Sri Lankan Tamils; Burghers; Sri Lankan Moors; other Indo-Aryans

The Sinhalese people (Sinhala: සිංහල ජනතාව, romanised: Sinhala Janathāva), also known as the Sinhalese or Sinhala people, are an Indo-Aryan ethno-linguistic group native to the island of Sri Lanka. They are the largest ethnic group in Sri Lanka, constituting about 75% of the Sri Lankan population and number more than 15.2 million.

The Sinhalese people speak Sinhala, an insular Indo-Aryan language. Sinhalese people are predominantly Theravada Buddhists, although a significant minority of Sinhalese follow branches of Christianity and other religions. Since 1815, Sinhalese people were broadly divided into two subgroups: the up-country Sinhalese of the central mountainous regions, and the low-country Sinhalese of the coastal regions. Although both groups speak the same language, they are distinguished as they observe different cultural customs.

According to the Mahavamsa, a Pali chronicle compiled by Buddhist monks of the Anuradhapura Maha Viharaya in Sri Lanka, the Sinhalese descend from settlers who immigrated to the island circa 543 BCE, from the legendary kingdom of Sinhapura led by Prince Vijaya, who mixed with later settlers from the Pandya kingdom. Genetic analyses have found genetic affinity between the Sinhalese and South Indian populations, as well as links to other Indian populations particularly a high affinity to populations descending from Ancestral South Indians (ASI).

== Etymology ==
There are a couple of explanations for the word Sinhala. Sinhala may be considered a combination of sinha (සිංහ), literally "lion", and la (ල), for "slayer" or "taker", hence Sinhala may mean "lion-slayer". The story of the derivation of Sinhala is told in Mahāvaṃsa, and it is believed to be a reference to the founding legend of Sri Lanka; the island was conquered by a descendant of Sinhabahu, who is said to have killed his father, a lion.

According to legend, a princess Suppadevi of Vanga was abducted by a lion, with whom she then bore a daughter called Sinhasivali, and a son, Sinhabahu. On the origin of Sinhala, Mahāvaṃsa says: "By whatever means; the monarch Síha Báhu slew the 'Síha' (lion), from that feat his sons and descendants are called 'Síhala' (the lion-slayers)." By this account, Sri Lanka conquered and colonised by his descendants therefore also came to be associated with 'Sinhala'.

The first king of Sri Lanka, Vijaya, was the son of Sinhabahu, the ruler of Sinhapura. Some versions suggest Vijaya was the grandson of Sinhabahu. According to the Mahavamsa and other historical sources, King Vijaya arrived on the island of Tambapanni (Sri Lanka) and gave rise to the Sinhalese. The story of the arrival of Prince Vijaya in Sri Lanka and the origin of the Sinhalese people is also depicted in the Ajanta caves, in a mural of cave number 17.

Another suggestion on the origin of Sinhala proposes that the descendants of Sinhabahu may have been called "Sinha" or lions, either because they were descended from a lion or because they were brave like a lion, but those who conquered and settled in Sri Lanka were called Sinhala simply as a derivative of "Sinha" for the people of the lion. Likewise, the conquered lands may be called 'Sinhalaya' or 'Sinhalé' (up-country Sri Lanka), or 'Sinhala dvipa', and their language 'Sinhala' or Sinhala-Bhasha'.

== History ==
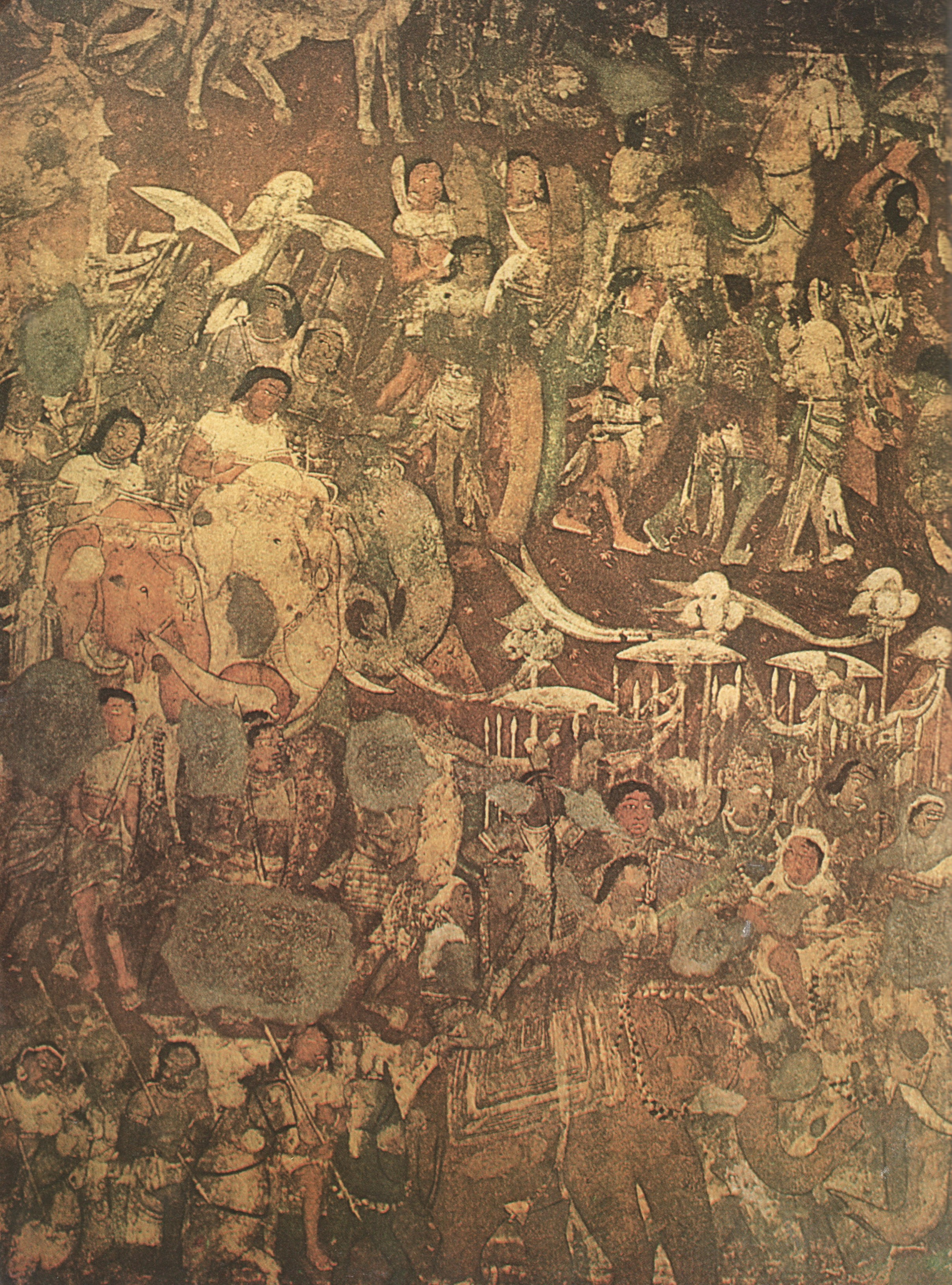
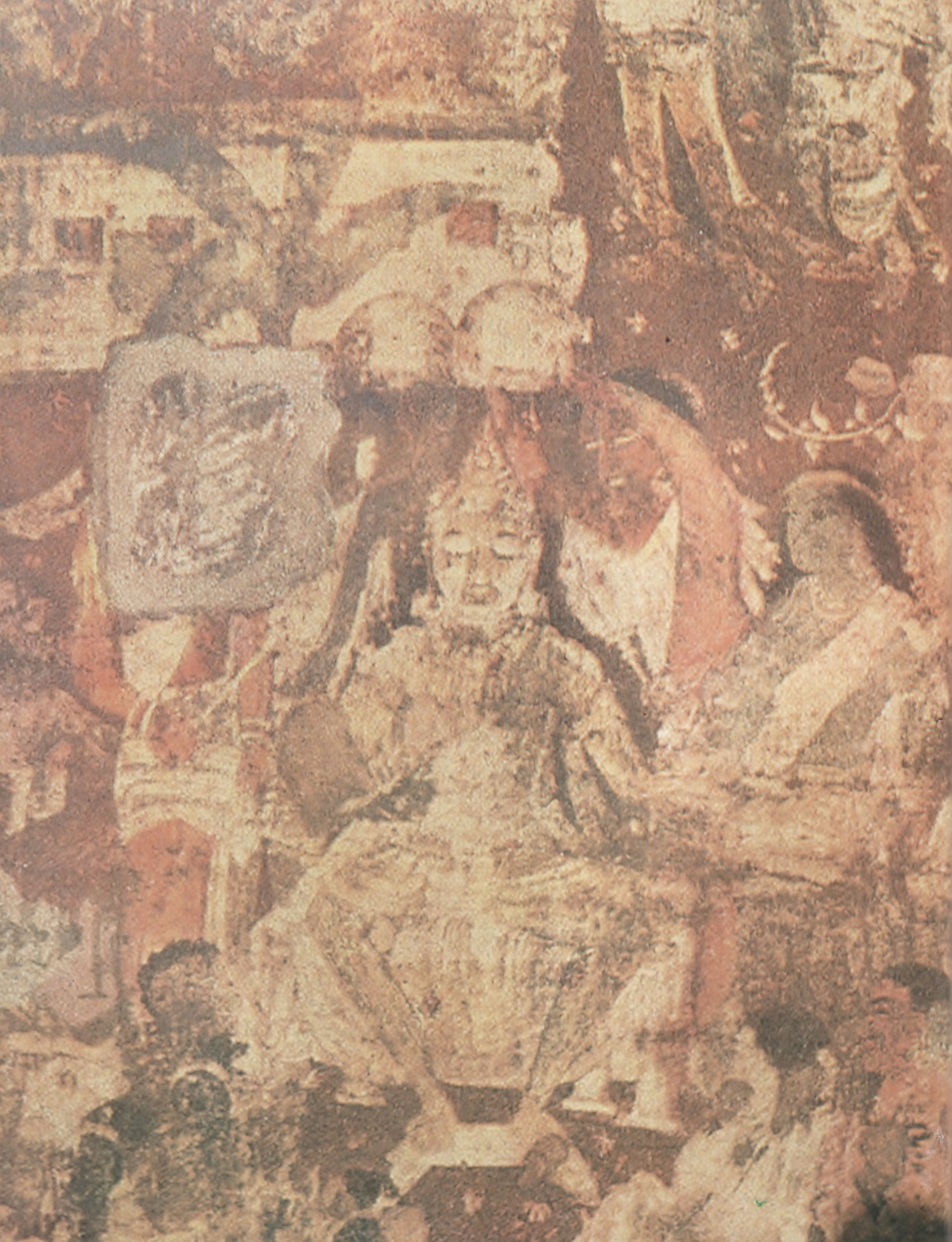
1 A section of the mural at Ajanta in Cave No 17, depicts the 'coming of Sinhala'. The prince (Prince Vijaya) is seen in both of groups of elephants and riders.
2 The consecration of King Sinhala (Prince Vijaya) (Detail from the Ajanta Mural of Cave No 17).

Historical population
Year	Pop.	±%
1881	1,846,600	—
1891	2,041,200	+10.5%
1901	2,330,800	+14.2%
1911	2,715,500	+16.5%
1921	3,016,200	+11.1%
1931	3,473,000	+15.1%
1946	4,620,500	+33.0%
1953	5,616,700	+21.6%
1963	7,512,900	+33.8%
1971	9,131,241	+21.5%
1981	10,979,561	+20.2%
1989 (est.)	12,437,000	+13.3%
2001	13,876,200	+11.6%
2011	15,250,081	+9.9%
2024	16,144,037	+5.9%
2001 Census was only carried out in 18 of the 25 districts. Source:Department of Census & Statistics, Sri Lanka & Statistics; Data is based on Sri Lankan Government Census.

The early recorded history of the Sinhalese is chronicled in two documents, the Mahavamsa, compiled in Pāli around the fourth century CE, and the later Culavamsa (the first segment probably compiled in the 13th century CE by the Buddhist monk Dhammakitti). These are ancient sources that cover the histories of the powerful ancient Sinhalese kingdoms of Anuradhapura and Polonnaruwa which lasted for 1500 years. The Mahavamsa describes the existence of fields of rice and reservoirs, indicating a well-developed agrarian society.

=== Pre-Anuradhapura period ===
According to the Mahavamsa, Prince Vijaya and his 700 followers left Suppāraka, landed on the island at a site believed by historians to be in the district of Puttalam, south of modern-day Mannar, and founded the kingdom of Tambapanni. It is recorded that Vijaya made his landing on the day of Buddha's Parinirvana. Vijaya claimed Tambapanni as his capital and soon the whole island went under this name. Tambapanni was originally inhabited and governed by Yakkhas, having their capital at Sirīsavatthu and their queen Kuveni. According to the Samyutta Commentary, Tambapanni was one hundred leagues in extent.

At the end of his reign, Vijaya, having trouble choosing a successor, sent a letter to the city of his ancestors, Sinhapura, in order to invite his brother Sumitta to take over the throne. However, Vijaya had died before the letter had reached its destination, so the elected minister of the people Upatissa, the Chief government minister and leading chief among the Sinhalese became regent and acted as regent for a year. After his coronation (in 505 BC), which was held in Tambapanni, he left it, building another city Upatissa Nuwara, named after himself, 11–13 km (7–8 miles) further north of Tambapanni. When Vijaya's letter finally arrived, Sumitta had already succeeded his father as king of his country, and so he sent his son Panduvasdeva to rule Upatissa Nuwara.

The Divyavadana, Valahassa Jataka and Xuanzang instead tells the tale of a merchant of jambudvipa called Simhala or (Sang-kia-la), the son of a great merchent called Simha (Sang-kia) who leads an expedition of five hundred merchants searching for gems. In the island they meet female raksas with whom they begin an relationship before escaping when they learn the Raksas were going to imprison them. Simhala is elected king in his own country, but leads an expedition to the island and founds a new kingdom after vanquishing the Raksas. According to this version the new country was named Simhala after the king.

=== Anuradhapura period ===
In 377 BC, King Pandukabhaya (437–367 BC) moved the capital to Anuradhapura and developed it into a prosperous city. Anuradhapura (Anurapura) was named after the minister who first established the village and after a grandfather of Pandukabhaya who lived there. The name was also derived from the city's establishment on the auspicious asterism called Anura. Anuradhapura was the capital of all the monarchs who ruled from the dynasty.

Rulers such as Dutthagamani, Valagamba, and Dhatusena are noted for defeating the South Indians and regaining control of the kingdom. Other rulers who are notable for military achievements include Gajabahu I, who launched an invasion against the invaders, and Sena II, who sent his armies to assist a Pandyan prince.

=== Polonnaruwa period ===
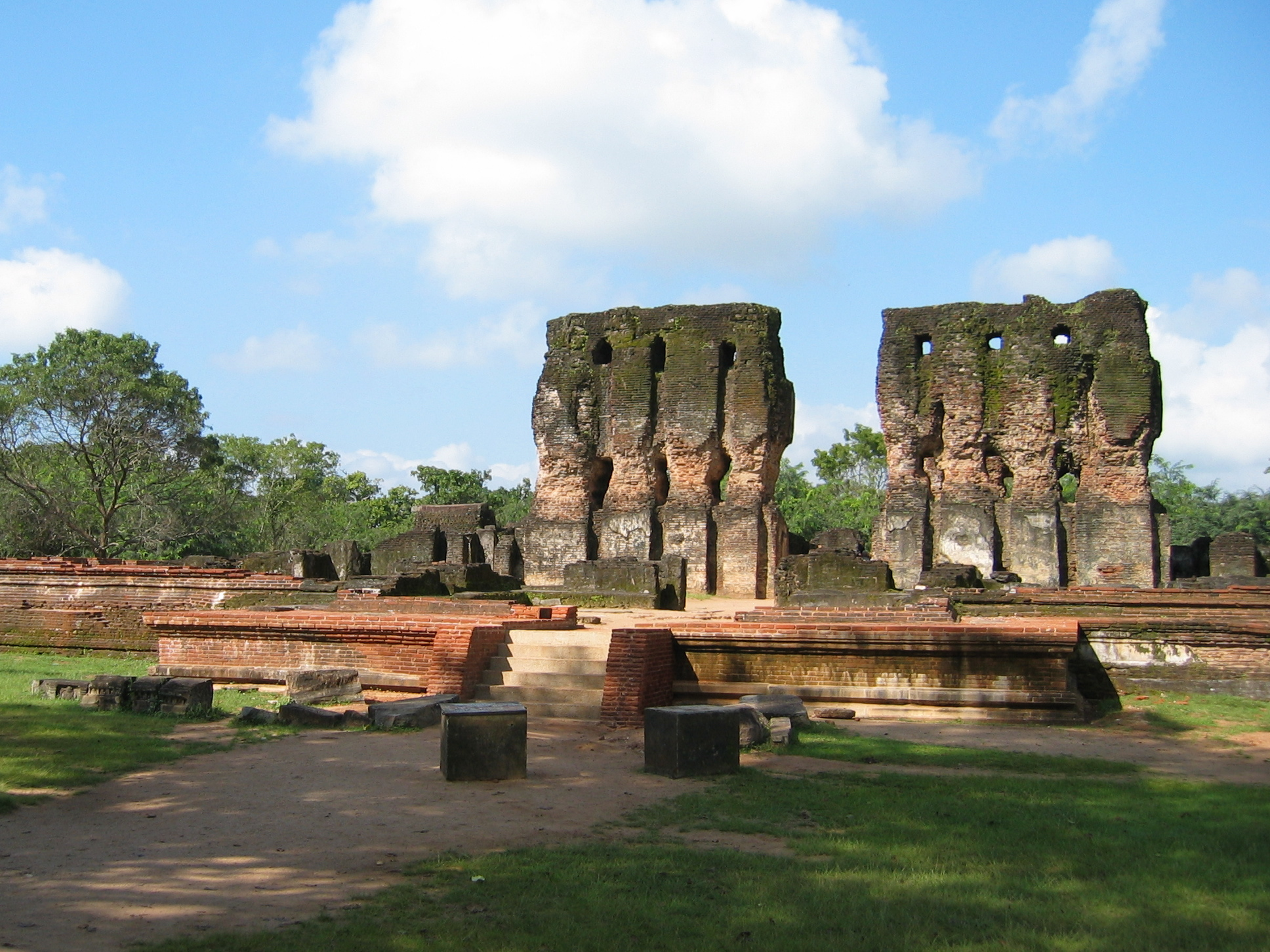
Ruins of the Royal palace of Polonnaruwa

During the Middle Ages Sri Lanka was well known for its agricultural prosperity under king Parakramabahu in Polonnaruwa during which period the island was famous around the world as the rice mill of the east.

=== Transitional period ===
Later in the 13th century the country's administrative provinces were divided into independent kingdoms and chieftaincies: kingdom of Sitawaka, kingdom of Kotte, Jaffna kingdom and the Kandyan kingdom. The invasion by the Hindu king Magha in the 13th century led to migrations by the Buddhists (mostly Sinhalese) to areas not under his control. This migration was followed by a period of conflict among the Sinhalese chiefs who tried to exert political supremacy. Parakramabahu VI, a Sinhalese king invaded the Jaffna kingdom and conquered it, bringing the entire country back under the Sinhalese kingdom for 17 years. Trade also increased during this period, as Sri Lanka began to trade cinnamon and a large number of Muslim traders were bought into the island.

In the 15th century a Kandyan kingdom formed which divided the Sinhalese politically into low-country and up-country. In this period, the Sinhalese caste structure absorbed recent Dravidian Hindu immigrants from South India leading to the emergence of three new Sinhalese caste groups – the Salagama, the Durava and the Karava.

=== Modern history ===
The Sinhalese have a stable birth rate and a population that has been growing at a slow pace relative to India and other Asian countries.

== Society ==
=== Demographics ===
==== Sri Lanka ====
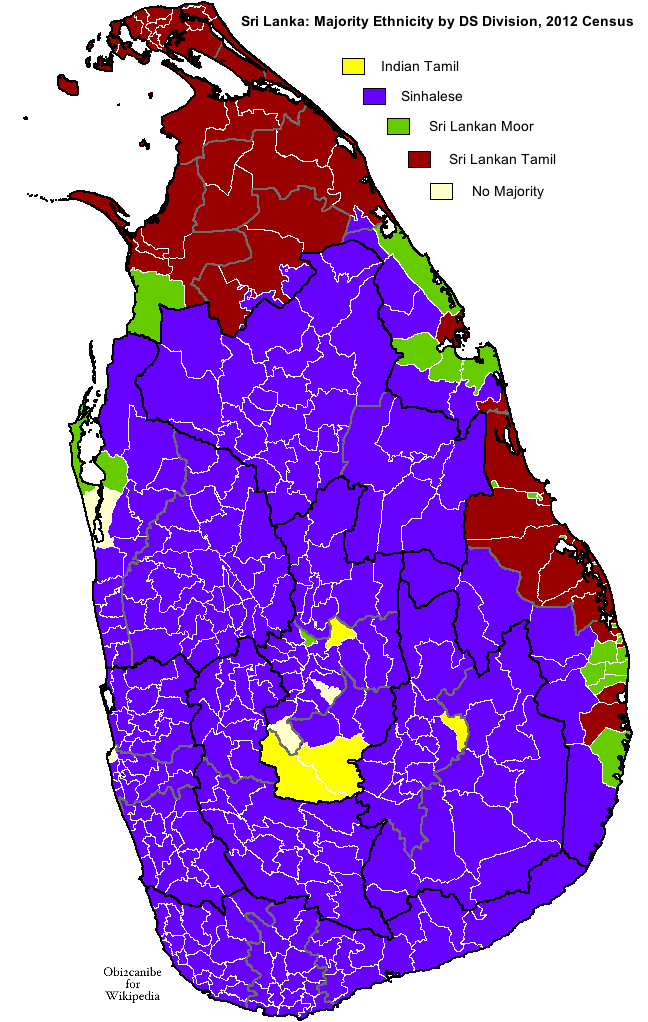
Distribution of majority ethnicity by DS Division according 2012 census

Within Sri Lanka the majority of the Sinhalese reside in the South, Central, Sabaragamuwa and Western parts of the country. This coincides with the largest Sinhalese populations areas in Sri Lanka. Cities with more than 90% Sinhalese population include Hambantota, Galle, Gampaha, Kurunegala, Monaragala, Anuradhapura and Polonnaruwa.

Distribution of Sinhalese in Sri Lanka (2012)
Province	Sinhalese people	% Sinhalese population of the province	% Provincial contribution to total population
Central	1,687,199	66.00%	11.11%
Eastern	359,136	23.15%	2.36%
Northern	32,331	3.05%	0.21%
North Central	1,143,607	90.90%	7.53%
North Western	2,030,370	85.70%	13.38%
Sabaragamuwa	1,657,967	86.40%	10.92%
Southern	2,340,693	94.96%	15.42%
Uva	1,017,092	80.80%	6.70%
Western	4,905,425	84.26%	32.32%
Total	15,173,820	74.80%	100.00%

==== Diaspora ====
The spread of Sinhalese in the United States

Sinhalese people have emigrated out to many countries for a variety of reasons. The larger diaspora communities are situated in the United Kingdom, Australia, United States and Canada among others. In addition to this there are many Sinhalese, who reside in the Middle East, Southeast Asia and Europe, temporarily in connection with employment and/or education. They are often employed as guest workers in the Middle East and professionals in the other regions.

The largest population centres of the Sinhalese diaspora are mainly situated in Europe, North America and Australia. The city of Melbourne contains just under half of the Sri Lankan Australians. The 2011 census recorded 86,412 Sri Lanka born in Australia. There are 73,849 Australians (0.4 of the population) who reported having Sinhalese ancestry in 2006. Sinhala was also reported to be the 29th-fastest-growing language in Australia (ranking above Somali but behind Hindi and Belarusian). Sinhalese Australians have an exceptionally low rate of return migration to Sri Lanka. In the 2011 Canadian Census, 7,220 people identified themselves as of Sinhalese ancestry, out of 139,415 Sri Lankans. There are a small number of Sinhalese people in India, scattered around the country, but mainly living in and around the northern and southern regions. Sri Lankan New Zealanders comprised 3% of the Asian population of New Zealand in 2001. The numbers arriving continued to increase, and at the 2018 census there were over 16,000 Sri Lankans living in New Zealand among those 9,171 were Sinhalese.

In the U.S., the Sinhalese number about 12,000 people. The New York City Metropolitan Area contains the largest Sri Lankan community in the United States, receiving the highest legal permanent resident Sri Lankan immigrant population, followed by Central New Jersey and the Los Angeles metropolitan area. Many Sinhalese have migrated to Italy since the 1970s. Italy was attractive to the Sinhalese due to perceived easier employment opportunities and entry, compared to other European countries. It is estimated that there are 30,000–33,000 Sinhalese in Italy. The major Sinhalese communities in Italy are located in Lombardy (in the districts Loreto and Lazzaretto), Milan, Lazio, Rome, Naples, and Southern Italy (Particularly Palermo, Messina and Catania). Many countries census list Sri Lankan, which also includes Sri Lankan Tamils, so the numbers of just Sinhalese are not as accurate when the census states Sri Lankan and not Sinhalese. Though Sinhalese people in particular and Sri Lankans in general have migrated to the UK over the centuries beginning from the colonial times, the number of Sinhalese people in the UK cannot be estimated accurately due to inadequacies of census in the UK. The UK government does not record statistics on the basis of language or ethnicity and all Sri Lankans are classified into one group as Asian British or Asian Other.

=== Language and literature ===
The word Sinhala in Yasarath font.

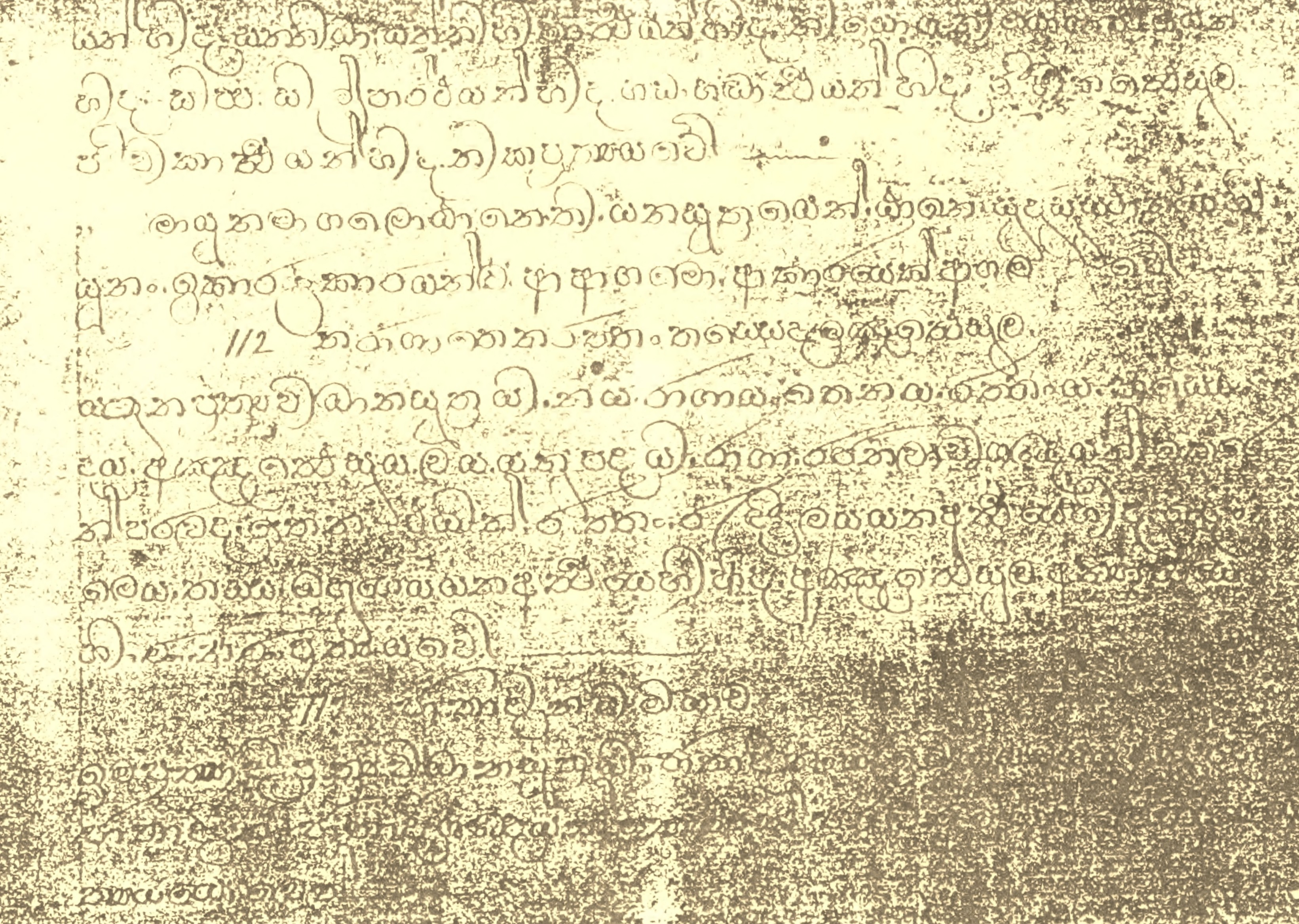
An ola leaf manuscript written in Sinhala.

Sinhalese people speak Sinhala, also known as "Helabasa"; this language has two varieties, spoken and written. Sinhala is an Indo-Aryan language within the broader group of Indo-European languages. The early form of the language was brought to Sri Lanka by the ancestors of the Sinhalese people from northern India who settled on the island in the sixth century BCE. Sinhala developed in a way different from the other Indo-Aryan languages because of the geographic separation from its Indo-Aryan sister languages. It was influenced by many languages, prominently Pali, the sacred language of Southern Buddhism, Telugu and Sanskrit. Many early texts in the language such as the Hela Atuwa were lost after their translation into Pali. Other significant Sinhala texts include Amāvatura, Kavu Silumina, Jathaka Potha and Sala Liheeniya. Sinhala has also adopted many loanwords of foreign origin, including from many Indian languages such as Tamil and European languages such as Portuguese, Dutch, and English.

Sandesha Kavyas written by Buddhist priests of Sri Lanka are regarded as some of the most sophisticated and versatile works of literature in the world. The Sinhala language was mainly inspired by Sanskrit and Pali, and many words of the Sinhala language derive from these languages. Today some English words too have come in as a result of the British occupation during colonial times, and the exposure to foreign cultures through television and foreign films. Additionally many Dutch and Portuguese words can be seen in the coastal areas. Sinhalese people, depending on where they live in Sri Lanka, may also additionally speak English and or Tamil. According to the 2012 Census 23.8% or 3,033,659 Sinhalese people also spoke English and 6.4% or 812,738 Sinhalese people also spoke Tamil. In the Negombo area bilingual fishermen who generally identify themselves as Sinhalese also speak the Negombo Tamil dialect. This dialect has undergone considerable convergence with spoken Sinhala.

Folk tales like Mahadana Muttha saha Golayo and Kawate Andare continue to entertain children today. Mahadana Muttha tells the tale of a fool cum Pundit who travels around the country with his followers (Golayo) creating mischief through his ignorance. Kawate Andare tells the tale of a witty court jester and his interactions with the royal court and his son.

In the modern period, Sinhala writers such as Martin Wickremasinghe and G. B. Senanayake have drawn widespread acclaim. Other writers of repute include Mahagama Sekera and Madewela S. Ratnayake. Martin Wickramasinghe wrote the immensely popular children's novel Madol Duwa. Munadasa Cumaratunga's Hath Pana is also widely known.

=== Religion ===
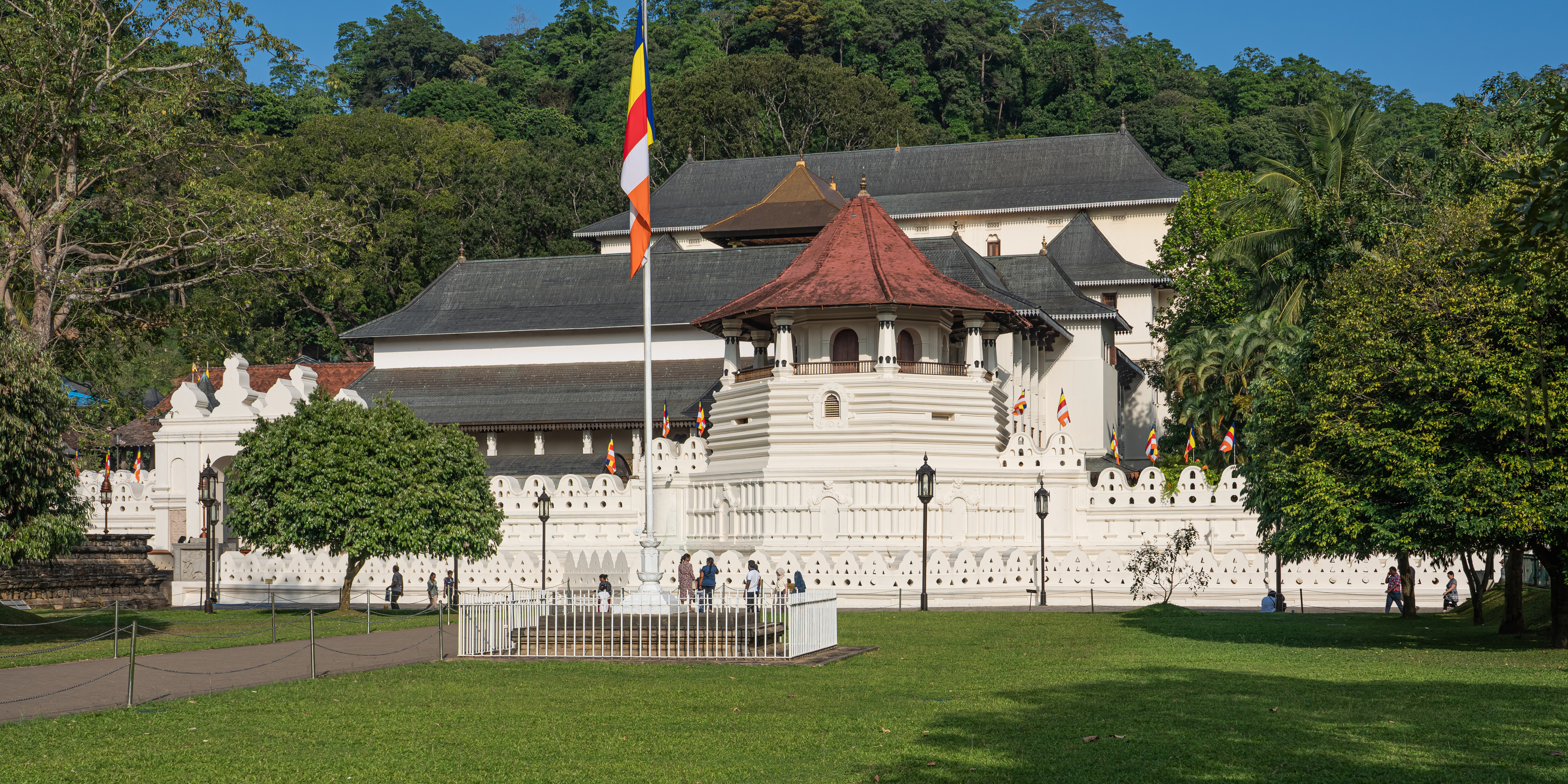
The Temple of the Tooth was renovated during the Buddhist revival.

The oldest and predominant school of Buddhism in Sri Lanka is known as Theravada (school of elders). The Pali chronicles (e.g., the Mahavamsa) claim that the Sinhalese as an ethnic group are destined to preserve and protect Buddhism. In 1988 almost 93% of the Sinhala-speaking population in Sri Lanka were Buddhist. Observations of current religious beliefs and practices demonstrate that the Sinhalese, as a religious community, have a complex worldview as Buddhists. Due to the proximity and on some occasions similarity of certain doctrines, there are many areas where Buddhists and Hindus share religious views and practices. Sinhalese Buddhists have adopted religious elements from Hindu traditions in their religious practices. Some of these practices may relate to ancient indigenous beliefs and traditions on spirits (folk religion), and the worship of Hindu deities. Some of these figures are used in healing rituals and may be native to the island. Gods and goddess derived from Hindu deities are worshiped by Sinhalese. Kataragama Deviyo from Kartikeya, Upulvan from Vishnu and Ayyanayake from Aiyanar can be named as examples. Though these gods take the same place as their Hindu counterparts in mythology, some of their aspects are different compared to the original gods.

Prominent Sri Lankan anthropologists Gananath Obeyesekere and Kitsiri Malalgoda used the term "Protestant Buddhism" to describe a type of Buddhism that appeared among the Sinhalese in Sri Lanka as a response to Protestant Christian missionaries and their evangelical activities during the British colonial period. This kind of Buddhism involved emulating the Protestant strategies of organising religious practices. They saw the need to establish Buddhist schools for educating Buddhist youth and organising Buddhists with new organisations such as the Young Men's Buddhist Association, as well as printing pamphlets to encourage people to participate in debates and religious controversies to defend Buddhism.

==== Christianity ====
There is a significant Sinhalese Christian community, in the maritime provinces of Sri Lanka. Christianity was brought to the Sinhalese by Portuguese, Dutch, and British missionary groups during their respective periods of rule. Most Sinhalese Christians are Roman Catholic; a minority are Protestant. Their cultural centre is Negombo.

Religion is considered very important among the Sinhalese. According to a 2008 Gallup poll, 99% of Sri Lankans considered religion an important aspect of their daily lives.

=== Genetics ===
A 2023 genetics study by Singh et al. using higher resolution markers than previous studies found strong affinity between Sri Lankan and South Asian maternal gene pools as well as a high level of West Eurasian maternal ancestry among the Sinhalese. The analyses show strong gene flow between the Sinhalese and Sri Lankan Tamils, and higher gene flow from South Indian as well as some North and Northwest Indian populations. Among the Indian populations, the Sinhalese are closest genetically to certain South Indian subgroups, the analyses also reveal some roots with the Maratha. Some older studies however pointed towards a predominantly Bengali contribution and a minor Tamil influence. Gujarati and Punjabi lineages are also visible. Whole-genome sequencing of Sinhalese in 2025 has shown Sinhalese have high affinity to Ancestral South Indians(ASI) and align closely with urban Southern Indian populations such as the Indian Telugu in Yadava, Urban Bangalore, and Urban Chennai. Sinhalese and Vedda are genetically closest to each other and to South Indians but Sinhalese have lower affinity to Ancient Ancestral South Indians (AASI) than the Veddha indicating Veddha have greater ancient hunter-gatherer ancestry than the Sinhalese.

In relation to the former, other studies also show the Sinhalese possess some genetic admixture from Southeast Asian populations, especially from Austroasiatic groups. Certain Y-DNA and mtDNA haplogroups and genetic markers of immunoglobulin among the Sinhalese, for example, show Southeast Asian genetic influences many of which are also found among certain Northeast Indian populations to whom the Sinhalese display increased genetic affinities.

== Culture ==
Sinhalese culture is a unique one dating as far back as 2600 years and has been nourished by Theravada Buddhism. Its main domains are sculpture, fine arts, literature, dancing, poetry and a wide variety of folk beliefs and rituals traditionally. Ancient Sinhala stone sculpture and inscriptions are known worldwide and is a main foreign attraction in modern tourism. Sigiriya is famous for its frescoes. Folk poems were sung by workers to accompany their work and narrate the story of their lives. Ideally these poems consisted of four lines and, in the composition of these poems, special attention had been paid to the rhyming patterns. Buddhist festivals are dotted by unique music using traditionally Sinhalese instruments. More ancient rituals like tovils (devil exorcism) continue to enthral audiences today and often praised and invoked the good powers of the Buddha and the gods in order to exorcise the demons.

=== Dress ===
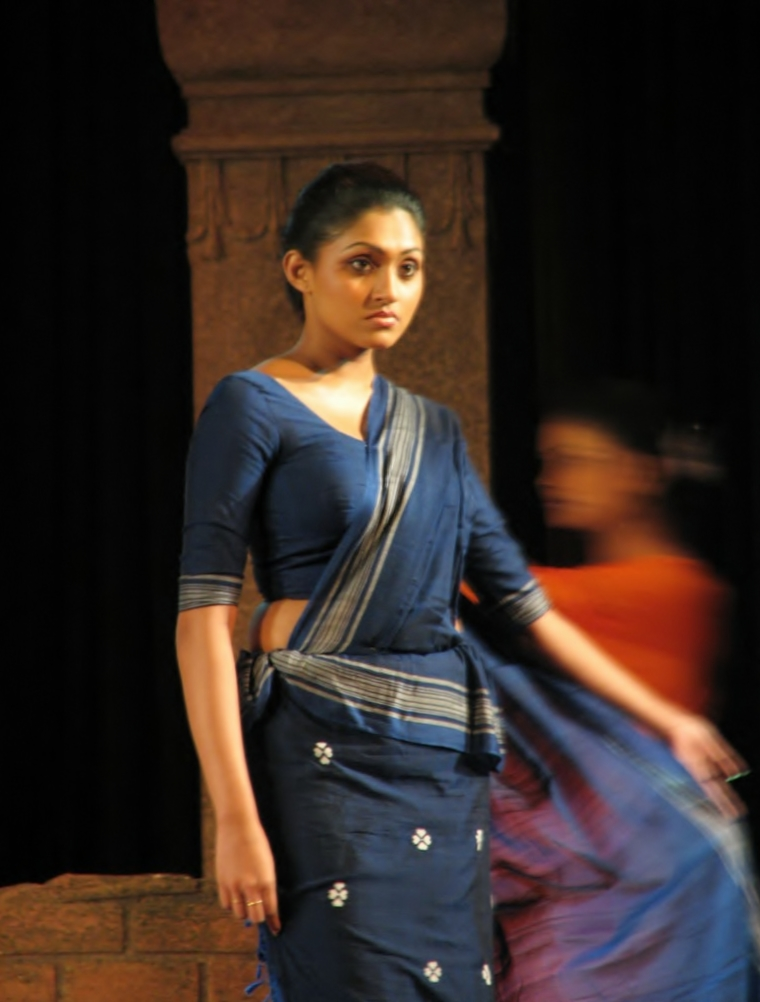
Sinhalese girl in Osariya

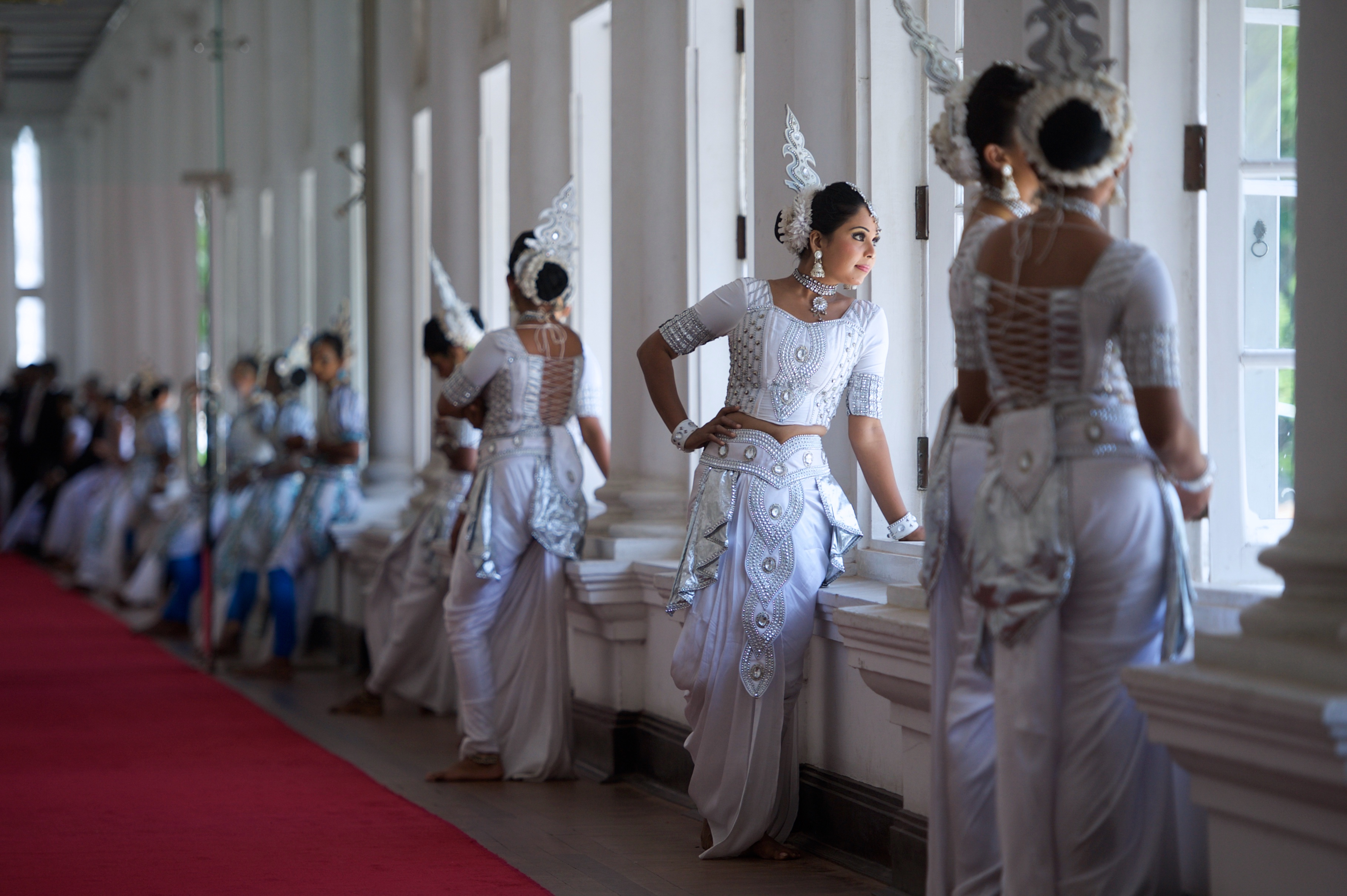
Sinhalese girls in traditional Kandyan dancing costume

Traditionally during recreation the Sinhalese wear a sarong (sarama in Sinhala). Men may wear a long-sleeved shirt with a sarong. Clothing varies by region for women. Low country Sinhalese women wear a white Long sleeved jacket, and a tight wrap around skirt, which usually is embedded with a floral or pattern design. As for the up country Sinhalese, women wear a similar outfit, but with a puffed up shoulder jacket, and a tucked in frill that lines the top of the skirt (Reda and Hatte in Sinhala). Traditionally, high caste Kandyan women wear a Kandyan style sari, which is similar to the Maharashtrian sari, with the drape but with a frill lining the bottom half and sometimes puffed up sleeves. It is also called an Osariya. The low country high caste women wear a South Indian style saree. Within the more populated areas, Sinhalese men also wear Western-style clothing — wearing suits while the women wear skirts and blouses. For formal and ceremonial occasions women wear the traditional Kandyan (Osariya) style, which consists of a full blouse which covers the midriff completely, and is partially tucked in at the front. However, modern intermingling of styles has led to most wearers baring the midriff. The Kandyan style is considered as the national dress of Sinhalese women. In many occasions and functions, even the saree plays an important role in women's clothing and has become the de facto clothing for female office workers especially in government sector. An example of its use is the uniform of air hostesses of SriLankan Airlines.

=== Art and architecture ===
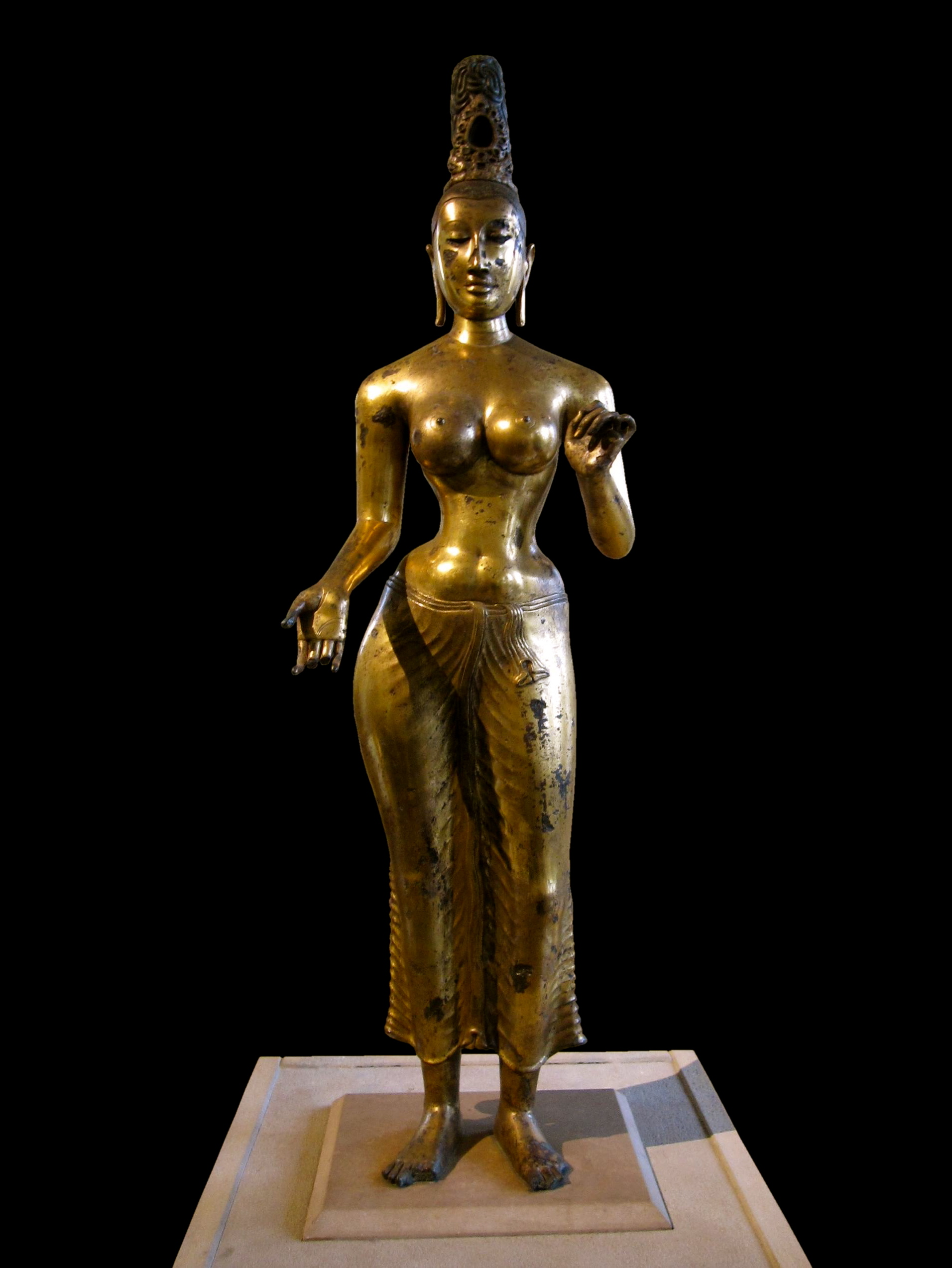
Gilded bronze statue of the Bodhisattva Tara, from the Anuradhapura period, eighth century. Now housed in the British museum.

Many forms of Sri Lankan arts and crafts take inspiration from the island's long and lasting Buddhist culture which in turn has absorbed and adopted countless regional and local traditions. In most instances Sri Lankan art originates from religious beliefs, and is represented in many forms such as painting, sculpture, and architecture. One of the most notable aspects of Sri Lankan art are caves and temple paintings, such as the frescoes found at Sigiriya, and religious paintings found in temples in Dambulla and Temple of the Tooth Relic in Kandy. Other popular forms of art have been influenced by both natives as well as outside settlers. For example, traditional wooden handicrafts and clay pottery are found around the hill country while Portuguese-inspired lacework and Indonesian-inspired Batik have become notable. It has many different and beautiful drawings.

Developed upon Indo-Aryan architectural skills in the late sixth century BCE Sinhalese people who lived upon greater kingdoms such as Anuradhapura and Polonnaruwa have built so many architectural examples such as Ruwanwelisaya, Jetavanaramaya – second tallest brick building in the ancient world after Great Pyramid of Giza, and Abayagiriya – third tallest brick building in the ancient world. And also with the ancient hydraulic technology which is also unique to Sinhalese people to build ancient tanks, systematic ponds with fountains moats and Irrigational reservoirs such as Parakrama Samudra, Kaudulla and Kandalama. Sigiriya which is considered by many as the eighth wonder of the world, it is a combination of natural and man made fortress, which consists so many architectural aspects.

=== Music ===
There are extensive folk poems relating to specific jobs of the ancient society. These poems were communal songs which had a rhythm that were sung when performing day-to-day tasks like harvesting and sowing.

Concerning popular music, Ananda Samarakoon developed the reflective and poignant Sarala gee style with his work in the late 1930s/early 1940s. He has been followed by artists of repute such as Sunil Shantha, W. D. Amaradeva, Premasiri Khemadasa, Nanda Malini, Victor Ratnayake, Austin Munasinghe, T. M. Jayaratne, Sanath Nandasiri, Sunil Edirisinghe, Neela Wickremasinghe, Gunadasa Kapuge, Malini Bulathsinghala and Edward Jayakody.

=== Film and theatre ===
Dramatist Ediriweera Sarachchandra revitalised the drama form with Maname in 1956. The same year, film director Lester James Peries created the artistic masterwork Rekava which sought to create a uniquely Sinhalese cinema with artistic integrity. Since then, Peries and other directors like Vasantha Obeysekera, Dharmasena Pathiraja, Mahagama Sekera, W. A. B. de Silva, Dharmasiri Bandaranayake, Sunil Ariyaratne, Siri Gunasinghe, G. D. L. Perera, Piyasiri Gunaratne, Titus Thotawatte, D. B. Nihalsinghe, Ranjith Lal, Dayananda Gunawardena, Mudalinayake Somaratne, Asoka Handagama, and Prasanna Vithanage have developed an artistic Sinhalese cinema. Sinhala cinema is often made colourful with the incorporation of songs and dance adding more uniqueness to the industry.

In the recent years high budget films like Aloko Udapadi, Aba (film) and Maharaja Gemunu based on Sinhalese epic historical stories gain huge success.

=== Performing arts ===
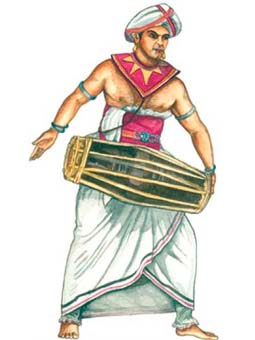
Kandyan drummer

Performing arts of the Sinhalese people can be categorised into few groups:

- Kandyan dance consist of 18 Wannam (dance routines) featuring behaviours of various animals such as elephant, eagle, cobra, monkey, peacock and rabbit, mainly performing in the annual Perahara pageant in Sri Dalada Maligawa Kandy.
- Pahatharata dance have a significant dancing style which is used to cure illnesses and spiritual clarification. The main feature of these dances is dancers wear masks representing various gods and demons, and use elements such as fire and water to bless people.
- Sabaragamuwa dances have also a significant dancing style, mainly to entertain people.
- Folk music and dances differ according to the casts of Sinhalese people and also some times regionally – mainly popular among small children, especially girls. These arts are widely performed during the Sinhalese New Year period.

=== Martial arts ===
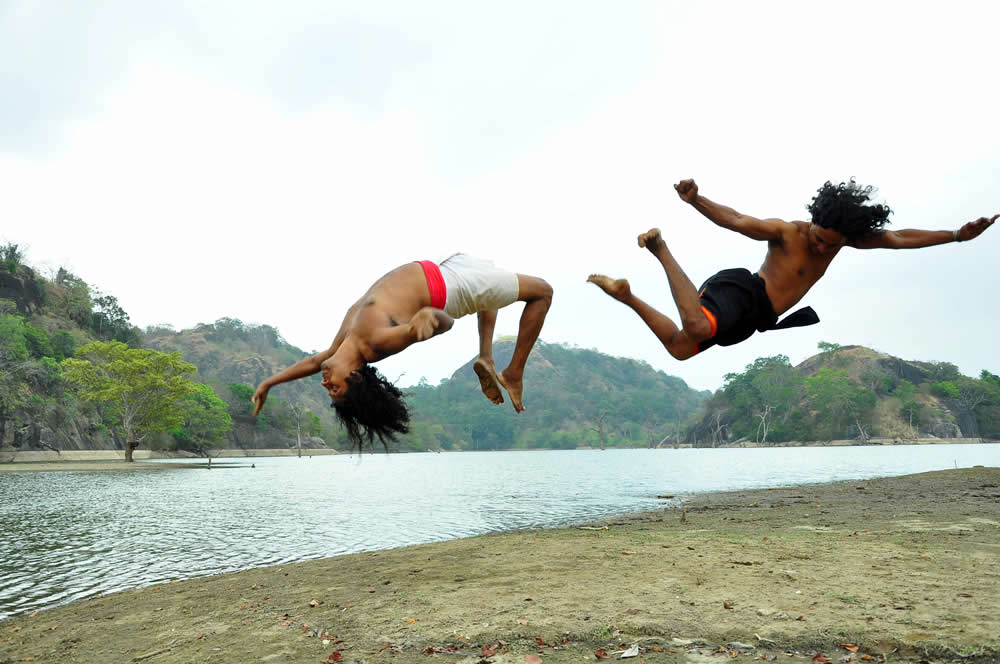
Angampora high kick

Angampora is the traditional martial art of the Sinhalese people. It combines combat techniques, self-defence, sport, exercise and meditation. Key techniques observed in Angampora are: Angam, which incorporates hand-to-hand fighting, and Illangam, which uses indigenous weapons such as Velayudaya, staves, knives and swords. Its most distinct feature is the use of pressure point attacks to inflict pain or permanently paralyse the opponent. Fighters usually make use of both striking and grappling techniques, and fight until the opponent is caught in a submission lock that they cannot escape. Usage of weapons is discretionary. Perimeters of fighting are defined in advance, and in some of the cases is a pit. Angampora became nearly extinct after the country came under British rule in 1815, but survived in a few families until the country regained independence.

=== Science and education ===
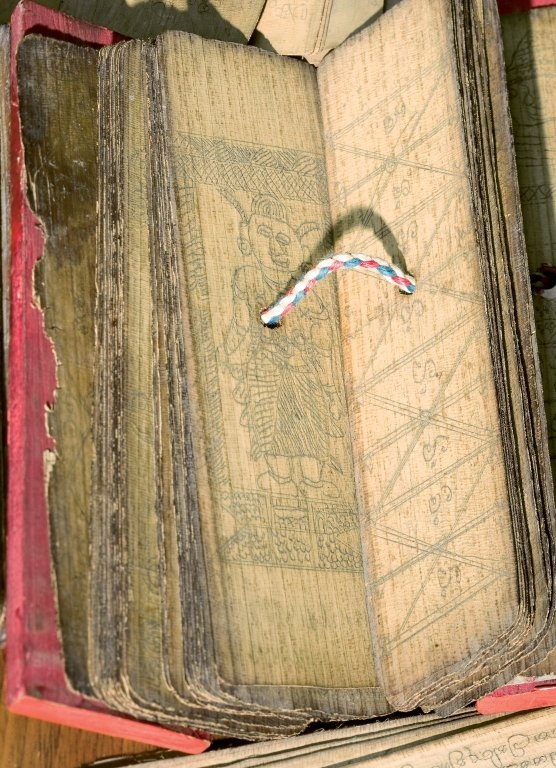
Sinhala ola leaf Medical Manuscripts.

The Sinhalese have a long history of literacy and formal learning. Instruction in basic fields like writing and reading by Buddhist Monks pre-date the birth of Christ. This traditional system followed religious rule and was meant to foster Buddhist understanding. Training of officials in such skills as keeping track of revenue and other records for administrative purposes occurred under this institution.

Technical education such as the building of reservoirs and canals was passed down from generation to generation through home training and outside craft apprenticeships.

The arrival of the Portuguese and Dutch and the subsequent colonisation maintained religion as the centre of education though in certain communities under Catholic and Presbyterian hierarchy. The British in the 1800s initially followed the same course. Following 1870 however they began a campaign for better education facilities in the region. Christian missionary groups were at the forefront of this development contributing to a high literacy among Christians.

By 1901 schools in the South and the North were well tended. The inner regions lagged behind however. Also, English education facilities presented hurdles for the general populace through fees and lack of access.

=== Medicine ===
Traditional Sinhalese villages in early days had at least one chief Medical personnel called Weda Mahaththaya (Doctor). These people practice their clinical activities by inheritance. Sinhalese Medicine resembles some of Ayurvedic practices in contrast for some treatments they use Buddhist Chantings (Pirith) in order to strengthen the effectiveness.

According to the Mahavamsa, the ancient chronicle, Pandukabhaya of Sri Lanka (437–367 BC) had lying-in-homes and Ayurvedic hospitals (Sivikasotthi-Sala) built in various parts of the country. This is the earliest documentary evidence we have of institutions specifically dedicated to the care of the sick anywhere in the world. Mihintale Hospital is the oldest in the world.

== See also ==
- List of Sinhalese people
- Dewa people of Sri Lanka
