= Nildandahinna =

Nildandahinna නිල්දණ්ඩාහින්න நில்தண்டாஹின்ன
- Town
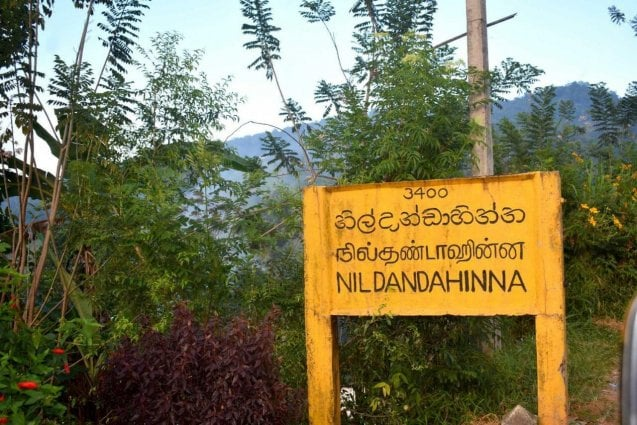
- Old Town sign of Nildandahinna
- Interactive map of Nildandahinna
- Coordinates: 7°4′49″N 80°53′36″E
- Country: Sri Lanka
- Province: Central Province
- District: Nuwara Eliya
- Divisional Secretariat: Walapane

Government
  - Type: Divisional Secretariat
  - Body: Walapane

Area
  - Total: 1.663 km^{2} (0.642 sq mi)
- Elevation: 1,060 m (3,480 ft)
- Time zone: UTC+05:30 (Sri Lanka Standard Time)
- Postal codes: 22280
- Area code: 052
- Website: www.walapane.ds.gov.lk/index.php/en/

Nildandahinna (Sinhala: නිල්දණ්ඩාහින්න) is a town in Sri Lanka, located within Nuwara Eliya District. Nildandahinna Postal code is 22280. Also Sri Sumangala National College is located in Nildandahinna. Nildandahinna is administrated by Walapane Divisional Secretariat.

== Geography ==
- Area - 1.663 km^{2} (0.642 sq mi)
- Elevation 1,060 m (3,480 ft) above sea level

== Climate ==
Nildandahinna is located above 1,060 metres (3,480 ft) above sea level. Nildandahinna has a tropical rainforest climate. It is usually (very) warm, humid and rainy all year round. It is dry for 49 days a year with an average humidity of 84% and an UV-index of 6. The temperatures range from 24 °C to just 14 °C in Nildandahinna. The terrain is mostly mountainous, with deep valleys cutting into it. The two main mountain regions are the Pidurutalagala range.

== Demographics ==
The population is only Sinhalese.

== Administrative division ==
- Walapane Divisional Secretariat.

== Villages of Nildandahinna ==
- Thewatta
- Dabbare
- Wangu hatha
- Nildandahinna
- Rambuke
- Walaskale

== See also ==
- Sri Sumangala National College
- List of towns in Central Province, Sri Lanka
