= Udamadura =

- Village
- Interactive map of Udamadura
- Coordinates: 7°5′25″N 80°55′20″E
- Country: Sri Lanka
- Province: Central Province
- Time zone: UTC+5:30 (Sri Lanka Standard Time)

Udamadura is a village in Sri Lanka. It is located within Central Province.

== See also ==
- List of towns in Central Province, Sri Lanka
