= Sinhabahu =

Legendary king of ancient India

- Spouse: Sinhasivali (sister)
- Issue: Vijaya, Sumitta
- Mother: Suppadevi

Sinhabahu depicted on the Flags of Sri Lanka

Sinhabahu (Sanskrit: Siṃhabāhu, IAST: सिंहबाहु, 'lion-armed') is a legendary king of ancient India, mentioned in the historical chronicle of Sri Lanka, the Mahavamsa. He is best known for being the founder of Sinhapura and being the father of Prince Vijaya, regarded to be the founder of Sri Lanka.

== Legend ==
=== Birth ===
According to the Mahavamsa, in the kingdom of Bengal, a queen named Mayavati from Kalinga gave birth to a daughter, Princess Suppadevi. At her birth, court astrologers predicted a willful and unruly future for the child. To prevent this, she was raised under strict supervision, but as she matured, Suppadevi became the most beautiful maiden in Bengal. Eventually, she escaped palace life, seeking freedom.

While traveling with a merchant caravan to Magadha, she reached the region of Lala (modern Gujarat), where the group was attacked—according to some accounts, a lion, and by others, a notorious robber chief named Sinha (meaning "lion"). Sinha took Suppadevi as his wife, and they lived in a forest cave. There, she bore him two children: a son, Sinhabahu, and a daughter, Sinhasivali.

As Sinhabahu grew, he learned of his royal ancestry and decided to return to Bengal with his mother and sister. Suppadevi, weary of forest life, agreed. While Sinha was away raiding, the three escaped. Sinhabahu carried his mother and sister through the forest until they reached a border village. By a stroke of fate, the governor of the region—who was also Suppadevi's cousin—was there. Recognizing his kin, he took them in, married Suppadevi, and raised the children as his own.

=== Founding of Sinhapura ===
Back in the forest, Sinha discovered their disappearance and was devastated. He searched for them, causing panic in the border villages. Locals appealed to the King of Bengal, who placed a bounty of 3,000 coins on the outlaw's head. Twice, Sinhabahu asked to confront the outlaw, but his mother restrained him. On the third attempt, he went without her knowledge and gained the king's approval—along with a promise of a governorship.

Sinhabahu returned to the forest and encountered Sinha. The bandit chief, overjoyed to see his son, rushed forward to embrace him. But Sinhabahu, bound by duty, shot him with an arrow and severed his head, which he brought back to the capital.

By then, the king had died, and no heir had been named. The ministers, recognizing Sinhabahu's royal descent and bravery, offered him the throne of Bengal. However, he declined and gave the kingship to his stepfather, the army commander. To honor his slain father, he returned to the Lala region, cleared the forest, and built a city called Sinhapura. He married his sister Sinhasivali and became king. Their union produced many sons, including Vijaya and Sumitta. Eventually, Sinhabahu appointed Vijaya as Prince Regent.

=== Vijayan’s Exile to Lanka ===
Vijayan soon proved to be reckless and violent, much like his grandfather Sinha. He gathered 700 unruly youths and began raiding villages, killing livestock, and even committing atrocities against children. The people protested, and the king repeatedly warned him, but the violence continued. Eventually, the angry populace demanded his removal.

King Sinhabahu, angered and ashamed, had Vijayan and his followers arrested. To mark their disgrace, half their heads were shaved. They were placed on a barely seaworthy ship and exiled. Their first landfall was at Supparaka, where they resumed their violent ways. However, the local people resisted fiercely, forcing Vijayan and his band to flee again.

They set sail once more and eventually landed on the island of Lanka. According to tradition, their arrival coincided with the death of Gautama Buddha at Kushinagara.

== Sinhabahu Drama ==
The tale of Sinhabahu was greatly popularised by playwright Ediriweera Sarachchandra, under the title 'Sinhabahu', which was adapted from the legend in the Mahavamsa.

== See also ==
- Vijaya
