= History of Sri Lanka =

The location of Sri Lanka

The history of Sri Lanka covers Sri Lanka and its surrounding regions of South Asia, Southeast Asia and the Indian Ocean.

Prehistoric Sri Lanka goes back 125,000 years and possibly even as far back as 500,000 years. The earliest humans found in Sri Lanka date to Prehistoric times about 35,000 years ago. Little is known about the history before the Indo-Aryan Settlement in the 6th century BC. The earliest documents of the settlement on the Island and its early history are found in the national chronicles of the Mahāvamsa, Dipavamsa, and the Culavamsa.

According to the Mahāvamsa, a chronicle written in Pāḷi, the preceding inhabitants of Sri Lanka were said to be Yakkhas and Nagas. Sinhalese history traditionally starts in 543 BC with the arrival of Prince Vijaya, a semi-legendary prince who sailed with 700 followers to the island, after being expelled from the Vanga Kingdom, in present-day Bengal. Prince Vijaya thereafter established the Sinhala Kingdom ushering in the historical period of Sri Lanka. During the Anuradhapura period (377 BCE–1017) Buddhism was introduced in the 3rd century BCE by Mahinda, son of Indian emperor Ashoka.

Due to the island's close proximity to Southern India, Dravidian influence on Sri Lankan politics and trade had been very active since the third century BC. Trade relations between the Anuradhapura Kingdom and southern India existed very probably from an early time. South Indian attempts at usurping power of the Anuradhapura Kingdom appears to have been at least motivated by the prospect of influencing the country's lucrative external trade. From about the fifth century AD onwards, Tamil mercenaries were brought to the island for the service of the Sinhalese monarchs. This would play a main role in the fall of the Anuradhapura Kingdom, part of an incompetent monarchy, in the 11th century with the Chola conquest.

Invasion of the Anuradhapura Kingdom by Rajaraja I began in 993 AD when he sent a large army to conquer the kingdom and absorb it into the Chola Empire. By 1017 most of the island was conquered and incorporated as a province of the vast empire beginning the Polonnaruwa period (1017–1232) of Sri Lanka. However the Chola occupation would be overthrown in 1070 through a campaign of Sinhalese Resistance led by Prince Kitti (later Vijayabahu I of Polonnaruwa). From the 10th century more permanent settlements of Tamils began to appear in Sri Lanka. While not extensive, these settlements formed the nucleus for later settlements around that of Northern Sri Lanka which would later form the Sri Lankan Tamil community of today.

The Sinhalese Kingdom now located in Polonnaruwa lasted less than two centuries. During its later turbulent stages it was once again invaded from the Indian mainland in 1215, forcing the Sinhalese to abandon their tranditional center of administration in the North central region of the island and flee south into the mountainous interior. This invasion saw a catastrophic decline in centralized Sinhalese power and began the Transitional period (1232–1597), which was characterised by the succession of capitals followed by the creation of the Jaffna Kingdom as a buffer state by the South Indian Pandyans.

The Crisis of the Sixteenth Century (1521–1597), started with the Vijayabā Kollaya, the division of the Sinhalese Kingdom, now at Kotte. The country was divided among three brothers resulting in a series of Wars of Succession. It was also at this time that the Portuguese intruded into the internal affairs of Sri Lanka, establishing control over the maritime regions of the island and seeking to control its lucrative external trade. The Crisis culminated in the collapse of the short lived but influential Kingdom of Sitawaka, and with Portuguese dominance, if not control by 1597, over two of three kingdoms that had existed at the start of the century, including the Jaffna Kingdom. The Kingdom of Kandy was the only independent Sinhalese kingdom to survive thus beginning the Kandyan period (1597–1815).

The Portuguese lost their possessions in Sri Lanka due to Dutch intervention in the Eighty Years' War, and the Dutch too were soon replaced by the British. Following the Kandyan Wars and an internal struggle between the Sinhalese monarch at the time and the Kandyan aristocracy, the island was united for the final time and came under British colonial rule in 1815 beginning the British Ceylon period (1815–1948). Armed resistance against the British took place in the 1818 and the 1848. Native sovereignty was once again achieved when Independence was granted in 1948 as a Dominion of the British Empire. In 1972 Sri Lanka became a Republic. A constitution was introduced in 1978 which created Sri Lanka a unitary semi-presidential constitutional republic. In the 1970s and 80s the country suffered from armed uprisings in 1971 and 1987–89 and a Civil War which lasted 25 years ending in 2009.

== Geographical background ==
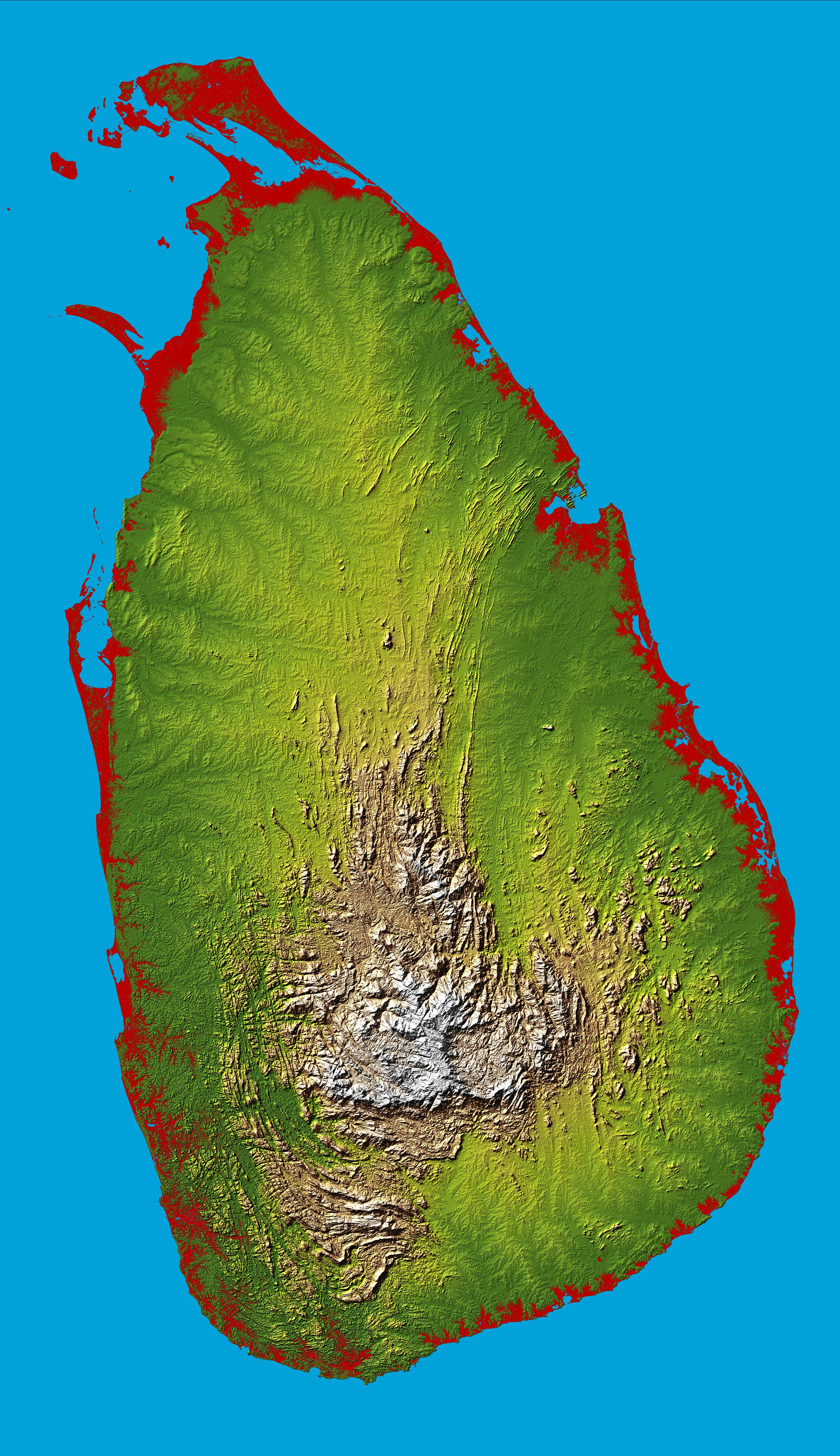
Topographic map of Sri Lanka

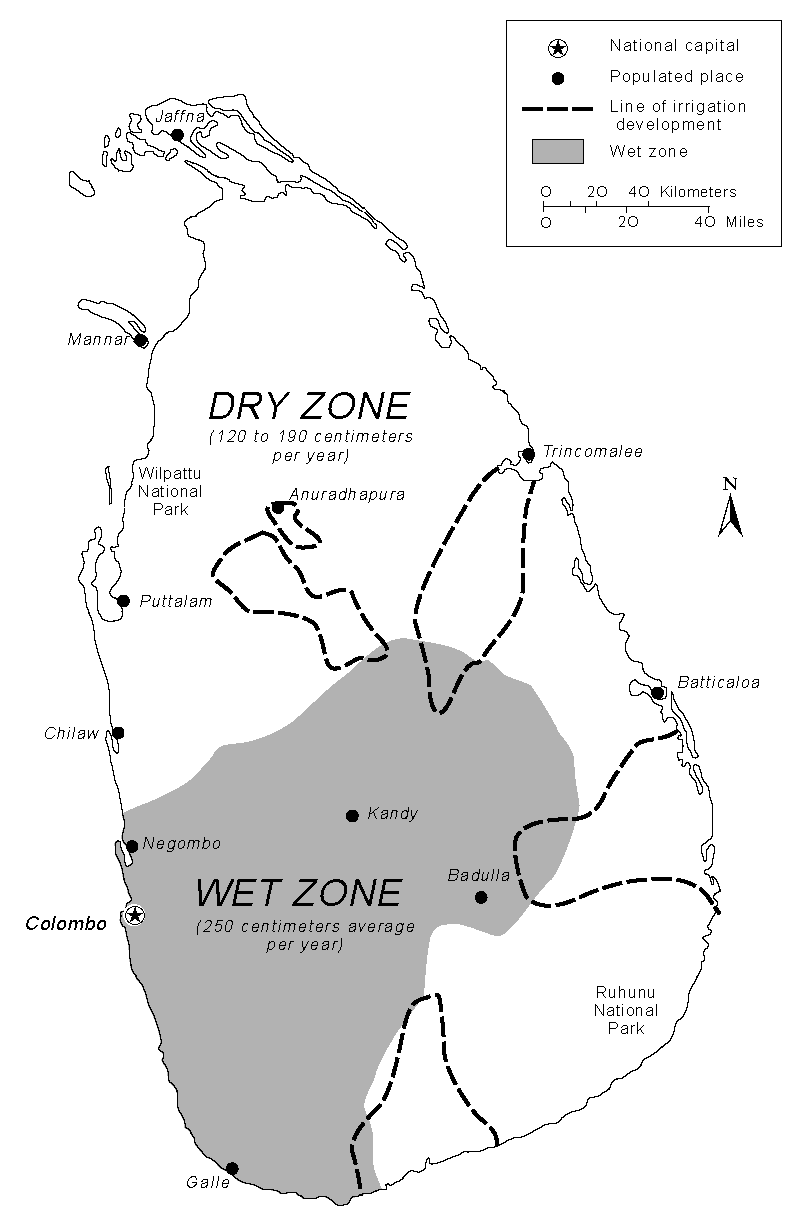
Precipitation and irrigation map of Sri Lanka

Sri Lanka lies on the Indian Plate, a major tectonic plate that was formerly part of the Indo-Australian Plate. It is in the Indian Ocean southwest of the Bay of Bengal, between latitudes 5° and 10°N, and longitudes 79° and 82°E. Sri Lanka is separated from the mainland portion of the Indian subcontinent by the Gulf of Mannar and Palk Strait. According to Hindu mythology, a land bridge existed between the Indian mainland and Sri Lanka. It now amounts to only a chain of limestone shoals remaining above sea level. Legends claim that it was passable on foot up to 1480 AD, until cyclones deepened the channel. Portions are still as shallow as 1 metre (3 ft), hindering navigation. The island consists mostly of flat to rolling coastal plains, with mountains rising only in the south-central part. The highest point is Pidurutalagala, reaching 2,524 metres (8,281 ft) above sea level.

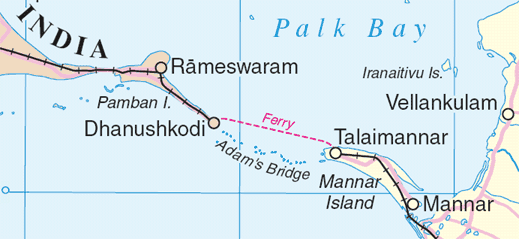
Rama's Bridge, a shoal "connecting" (northwestern) Sri Lanka (Talaimannar on Mannar island in that district) and (southern) India (Dhanushkodi (extinct)/Rameswaram in Ramanathapuram district) between the Gulf of Mannar (southwest) from the Palk Strait (northeast).

Sri Lanka has 103 rivers. The longest of these is the Mahaweli River, extending 335 kilometres (208 mi). These waterways give rise to 51 natural waterfalls of 10 meters or more. The highest is Bambarakanda Falls, with a height of 263 metres (863 ft). Sri Lanka's coastline is 1,585 km long. Sri Lanka claims an Exclusive economic zone (EEZ) extending 200 nautical miles, which is approximately 6.7 times Sri Lanka's land area. The coastline and adjacent waters support highly productive marine ecosystems such as fringing coral reefs and shallow beds of coastal and estuarine seagrasses.

Sri Lanka has 45 estuaries and 40 lagoons. Sri Lanka's mangrove ecosystem spans over 7,000 hectares and played a vital role in buffering the force of the waves in the 2004 Indian Ocean tsunami. The island is rich in minerals such as ilmenite, feldspar, graphite, silica, kaolinite, mica and thorium. Existence of petroleum and gas in the Gulf of Mannar has also been confirmed and the extraction of recoverable quantities is underway.

Lying within the Indomalayan realm, Sri Lanka is one of 25 biodiversity hotspots in the world. Although the country is relatively small in size, it has the highest biodiversity density in Asia. A remarkably high proportion of the species among its flora and fauna, 27% of the 3,210 flowering plants and 22% of the mammals (see List), are endemic. Sri Lanka has declared 24 wildlife reserves, which are home to a wide range of native species such as Asian elephants, leopards, sloth bears, the unique small loris, a variety of deer, the purple-faced langur, the endangered wild boar, porcupines and Indian pangolins.

Flowering acacias flourish on the arid Jaffna Peninsula. Among the trees of the dry-land forests are valuable species such as satinwood, ebony, ironwood, mahogany and teak. The wet zone is a tropical evergreen forest with tall trees, broad foliage, and a dense undergrowth of vines and creepers. Subtropical evergreen forests resembling those of temperate climates flourish in the higher altitudes. Yala National Park in the southeast protects herds of elephant, deer, and peacocks. The Wilpattu National Park in the northwest, the largest national park, preserves the habitats of many water birds such as storks, pelicans, ibis, and spoonbills. The island has four biosphere reserves: Bundala, Hurulu Forest Reserve, the Kanneliya-Dediyagala-Nakiyadeniya, and Sinharaja. Of these, Sinharaja forest reserve is home to 26 endemic birds and 20 rainforest species, including the elusive red-faced malkoha, the green-billed coucal and the Sri Lanka blue magpie.

During the Mahaweli Development programme of the 1970s and 1980s in northern Sri Lanka, the government set aside four areas of land totalling 1,900 km^{2} (730 sq mi) as national parks. Sri Lanka's forest cover, which was around 49% in 1920, had fallen to approximately 24% by 2009.

== Overview ==
Periodization of Sri Lanka history:

Dates	Period	Period	Span (years)	Subperiod	Span (years)	Main government
300,000 BP	Prehistoric Sri Lanka	Stone Age	300,000		–	Unknown
~1000 BCE–543 BCE	Prehistoric Sri Lanka	Iron Age	457		–	Republic
543 BCE–437 BCE	Ancient Sri Lanka	Pre-Anuradhapura	106		–	Monarchy
437 BCE–463 CE	Ancient Sri Lanka	Anuradhapura	1454	Early Anuradhapura	900	Monarchy
463–691	Ancient Sri Lanka	Anuradhapura	1454	Middle Anuradhapura	228	Monarchy
691–1017	Post-classical Sri Lanka	Anuradhapura	1454	Late Anuradhapura	326	Monarchy
1017–1070	Post-classical Sri Lanka	Polonnaruwa	215	Chola conquest	53	Monarchy
1055–1196	Post-classical Sri Lanka	Polonnaruwa	215	High Polonnaruwa	141	Monarchy
1196–1232	Post-classical Sri Lanka	Polonnaruwa	215	Late Polonnaruwa	36	Monarchy
1232–1341	Post-classical Sri Lanka	Transitional	365	Dambadeniya	109	Monarchy
1341–1412	Post-classical Sri Lanka	Transitional	365	Gampola	71	Monarchy
1412–1592	Early Modern Sri Lanka	Transitional	365	Kotte	180	Monarchy
1592–1707	Early Modern Sri Lanka	Kandyan	223	Early Kandyan	115	Monarchy
1707–1760	Early Modern Sri Lanka	Kandyan	223	Middle Kandyan	53	Monarchy
1760–1815	Early Modern Sri Lanka	Kandyan	223	Late Kandyan	55	Monarchy
1815–1833	Modern Sri Lanka	British Ceylon	133	Post-Kandyan	18	Colonial monarchy
1833–1927	Modern Sri Lanka	British Ceylon	133	Colebrooke–Cameron Reforms era	94	Colonial monarchy
1927–1948	Modern Sri Lanka	British Ceylon	133	Donoughmore Reforms era	21	Colonial monarchy
1948–1972	Contemporary Sri Lanka	Sri Lanka since 1948	78	Dominion	24	Constitutional monarchy
1972–present	Contemporary Sri Lanka	Sri Lanka since 1948	78	Republic	54	Unitary semi-presidential constitutional republic

== Prehistoric Sri Lanka ==
=== Pre Iron Age (Pre ~1000 BC) ===
The pre-history of Sri Lanka goes back 125,000 years and possibly even as far back as 500,000 years. The era spans the Palaeolithic, Mesolithic and early Iron Ages. Among the Paleolithic human settlements discovered in Sri Lanka, Pahiyangala (named after the Chinese traveller monk Faxian), which dates back to 37,000 BP, Batadombalena (28,500 BP) and Belilena (12,000 BP) are the most important. In these caves, archaeologists have found the remains of anatomically modern humans which they have named Balangoda Man, and other evidence suggesting that they may have engaged in agriculture and kept domestic dogs for driving game.

One of the first written references to the island is found in the Indian epic Ramayana, which provides details of a kingdom named Lanka that was created by the divine sculptor Vishwakarma for Kubera, the Lord of Wealth. It is said that Kubera was overthrown by his demon stepbrother Ravana, the powerful emperor who built a mythical flying machine named Dandu Monara. The modern city of Wariyapola is described as Ravana's airport.

Early inhabitants of Sri Lanka were probably ancestors of the Vedda people, an indigenous people numbering approximately 2,500 living in modern-day Sri Lanka. The 19th-century Irish historian James Emerson Tennent theorized that Galle, a city in southern Sri Lanka, was the ancient seaport of Tarshish from which the mythological King Solomon is said to have drawn ivory, peacocks, and other valuables.

=== Iron Age (~1000 BC–543 BC) ===
The protohistoric Early Iron Age appears to have established itself in South India by at least as early as 1200 BCE, if not earlier The earliest manifestation of this in Sri Lanka is radiocarbon-dated to c. 1000–800 BCE at Anuradhapura and Aligala shelter in Sigiriya. It is very likely that further investigations will push back the Sri Lankan lower boundary to match that of South India. Archaeological evidence for the beginnings of the Iron Age in Sri Lanka is found at Anuradhapura, where a large city–settlement was founded before 900 BCE. The settlement was about 15 hectares in 900 BCE, but by 700 BCE it had expanded to 50 hectares. A similar site from the same period has also been discovered near Aligala in Sigiriya.

The hunter-gatherer people known as the Wanniyala-Aetto or Veddas, who still live in the central, Uva and north-eastern parts of the island, are probably direct descendants of the first inhabitants, Balangoda Man. They may have migrated to the island from the mainland around the time humans spread from Africa to the Indian subcontinent. Achievements include the construction of the largest reservoirs and dams of the ancient world as well as enormous pyramid-like stupa architecture. This phase of Sri Lankan culture may have seen the introduction of early Buddhism. Early mythical history recorded in Buddhist scriptures refers to three visits by the Buddha to the island to see the Naga Kings, snakes that can take the form of a human at will. The earliest surviving chronicles from the island, the Dipavamsa and the Mahavamsa, say that tribes of Yakkhas, Nagas and Devas inhabited the island prior to the Indo-Aryan migration.

== Pre-Anuradhapura period (543–377 BCE) ==
=== Indo-Aryan syncretism ===
The Pali chronicles, the Dipavamsa, Mahavamsa, Thupavamsa and the Chulavamsa, as well as a large collection of stone inscriptions, the Indian Epigraphical records, the Burmese versions of the chronicles etc., provide information on the history of Sri Lanka from about the 6th century BCE.

The Mahavamsa, written around 400 CE by the monk Mahanama, using the Deepavamsa, the Attakatha and other written sources available to him, correlates well with Indian histories of the period. Indeed, Emperor Ashoka's reign is recorded in the Mahavamsa. The Mahavamsa account of the period prior to Asoka's coronation, 218 years after the Buddha's death, seems to be part legend. Proper historical records begin with the arrival of Vijaya and his 700 followers from Vanga. A detailed description of the dynastic accounts from Vijaya's time is provided in the Mahavamsa. H. W. Codrington puts it, 'It is possible and even probable that Vijaya ('The Conqueror') himself is a composite character combining in his person...two conquests' of ancient Sri Lanka. Vijaya is an Indian prince, the eldest son of King Sinhabahu ("Man with Lion arms") and his sister Queen Sinhasivali. Both these Sinhalese leaders were born of a mythical union between a lion and a human princess. The Mahavamsa states that Vijaya landed on the same day as the death of the Buddha (See Geiger's preface to Mahavamsa). The story of Vijaya and Kuveni (the local reigning queen) is reminiscent of Greek legend and may have a common source in ancient Proto-Indo-European folk tales.

According to the Mahavamsa, Vijaya landed on Sri Lanka near Mahathitha (Manthota or Mannar), and named on the island of Tambaparni ("copper-colored sand"). This name is attested to in Ptolemy's map of the ancient world. The Mahavamsa also describes the Buddha visiting Sri Lanka three times. Firstly, to stop a war between a Naga king and his son in law who were fighting over a ruby chair. It is said that on his last visit he left his foot mark on Siri Pada ("Adam's Peak").

Tamirabharani is the old name for the second longest river in Sri Lanka (known as Malwatu Oya in Sinhala and Aruvi Aru in Tamil). This river was a main supply route connecting the capital, Anuradhapura, to Mahathitha (now Mannar). The waterway was used by Greek and Chinese ships traveling the southern Silk Route.

Mahathir was an ancient port linking Sri Lanka to India and the Persian Gulf.

The present day Sinhalese are a mixture of the Indo Aryans and the Indigenous The Sinhalese are recognized as a distinct ethnic group from other groups in neighboring south India based on the Indo-Aryan language, culture, Theravada Buddhism, genetics and the physical anthropology.

== Anuradhapura period (377 BCE–1017) ==
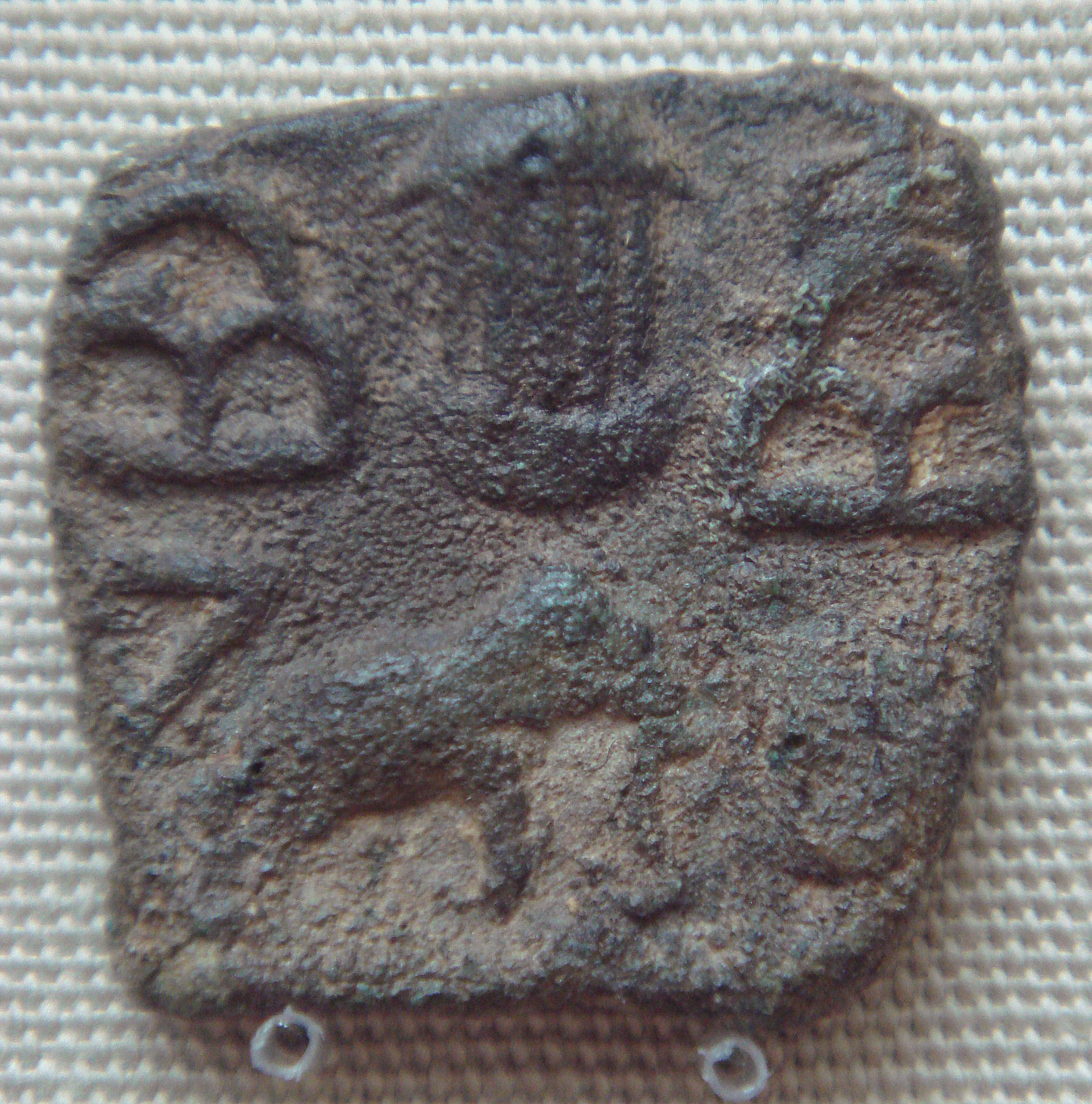
Pandyan Kingdom coin depicting a temple between hill symbols and elephant, Pandyas, Sri Lanka, 1st century CE.

In the early ages of the Anuradhapura Kingdom, the economy was based on farming and early settlements were mainly made near the rivers of the east, north central, and north east areas which had the water necessary for farming the whole year round. The king was the ruler of country and responsible for the law, the army, and being the protector of faith. Devanampiya Tissa (250–210 BCE) was Sinhalese and was friends with the King of the Maurya clan. His links with Emperor Asoka led to the introduction of Buddhism by Mahinda (son of Asoka) around 247 BCE. Sangamitta (sister of Mahinda) brought a Bodhi sapling via Jambukola (west of Kankesanthurai). This king's reign was crucial to Theravada Buddhism and for Sri Lanka.

The Mauryan-Sanskrit text Arthashastra referred to the pearls and gems of Sri Lanka. A kind of pearl, kauleya (Sanskrit: कौलेय) was referred in that text and also mentioned it collected from Mayurgrām of Sinhala. Pārsamudra(पारसमुद्र), a gem, was also being collected from Sinhala.

Ellalan (205–161 BCE) was a Tamil King who ruled "Pihiti Rata" (Sri Lanka north of the Mahaweli) after killing King Asela. During Ellalan's time Kelani Tissa was a sub-king of Maya Rata (in the south-west) and Kavan Tissa was a regional sub-king of Ruhuna (in the south-east). Kavan Tissa built Tissa Maha Vihara, Dighavapi Tank and many shrines in Seruvila. Dutugemunu (161–137 BCE), the eldest son of King Kavan Tissa, at 25 years of age defeated the South Indian Tamil invader Elara (over 64 years of age) in single combat, described in the Mahavamsa. The Ruwanwelisaya, built by Dutugemunu, is a dagaba of pyramid-like proportions and was considered an engineering marvel.

Pulahatta (or Pulahatha), the first of the Five Dravidians, was deposed by Bahiya. He in turn was deposed by Panaya Mara who was deposed by Pilaya Mara, murdered by Dathika in 88 BCE. Mara was deposed by Valagamba I (89–77 BCE) which ended Tamil rule. The Mahavihara Theravada Abhayagiri ("pro-Mahayana") doctrinal disputes arose at this time. The Tripitaka was written in Pali at Aluvihara, Matale. Chora Naga (63–51 BCE), a Mahanagan, was poisoned by his consort Anula who became queen. Queen Anula (48–44 BCE), the widow of Chora Naga and of Kuda Tissa, was the first Queen of Lanka. She had many lovers who were poisoned by her and was killed by Kuttakanna Tissa. Vasabha (67–111 CE), named on the Vallipuram gold plate, fortified Anuradhapura and built eleven tanks as well as pronouncing many edicts. Gajabahu I (114–136) invaded the Chola kingdom and brought back captives as well as recovering the relic of the tooth of the Buddha. A Sangam Period classic, Manimekalai, attributes the origin of the first Pallava King from a liaison between the daughter of a Naga king of Manipallava named Pilli Valai (Pilivalai) with a Chola king, Killivalavan, out of which union was born a prince, who was lost in ship wreck and found with a twig (pallava) of Cephalandra Indica (Tondai) around his ankle and hence named Tondai-man. Another version states "Pallava" was born from the union of the Brahmin Ashvatthama with a Naga Princess also supposedly supported in the sixth verse of the Bahur plates which states "From Ashvatthama was born the king named Pallava".

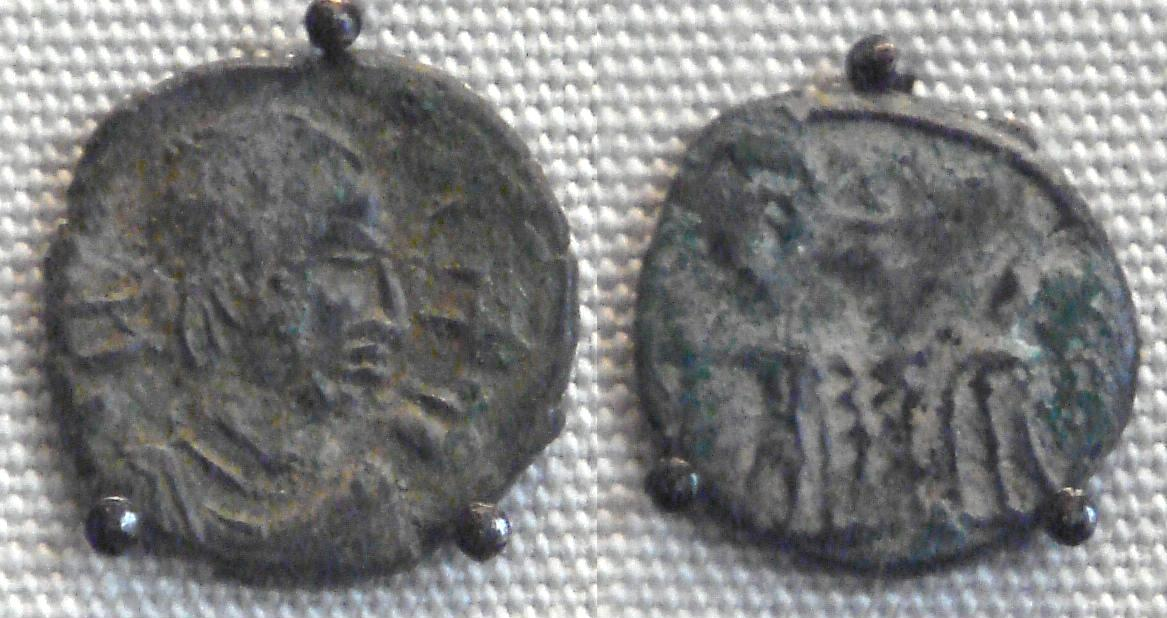
Sri Lankan imitations of 4th-century Roman coins, 4th to 8th centuries.

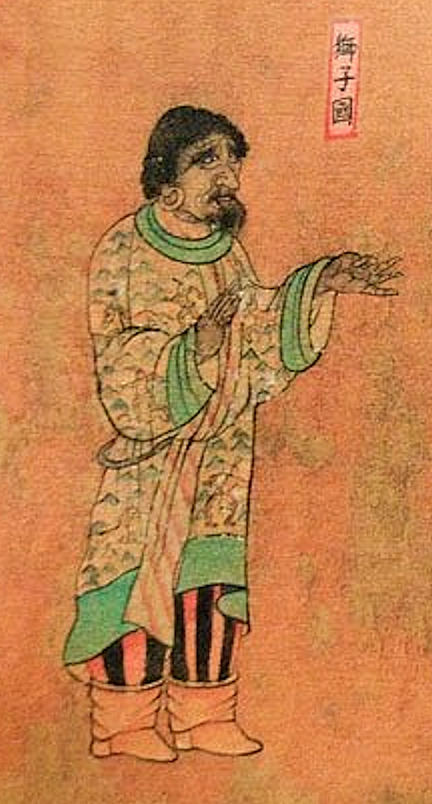
Ambassador from Sri Lanka (獅子國 Shiziguo) to China (Liang dynasty), Wanghuitu (王会图), circa 650 CE

There was intense Roman trade with the ancient Tamil country (present day Southern India) and Sri Lanka, establishing trading settlements which remained long after the fall of the Western Roman Empire.

It was in the first century AD where Saint Thomas the Apostle introduced Sri Lanka's first monotheistic religion, Christianity, according to a local Christian tradition

During the reign of Mahasena (274–301) the Theravada (Maha Vihara) was persecuted and the Mahayanan branch of Buddhism appeared. Later the King returned to the Maha Vihara. Pandu (429) was the first of seven Pandiyan rulers, ending with Pithya in 455. Dhatusena (459–477) "Kalaweva" and his son Kashyapa (477–495) built the famous Sigiriya rock palace where some 700 rock graffiti give a glimpse of ancient Sinhala.

Decline

In 993, when Raja Raja Chola sent a large Chola army which conquered the Anuradhapura Kingdom, in the north, and added it to the sovereignty of the Chola Empire. The whole island was subsequently conquered and incorporated as a province of the vast Chola empire during the reign of his son Rajendra Chola.

== Polonnaruwa period (1056–1232) ==
The Kingdom of Polonnaruwa was the second major Sinhalese kingdom of Sri Lanka. It lasted from 1055 under Vijayabahu I to 1212 under the rule of Lilavati. The Kingdom of Polonnaruwa came into being after the Anuradhapura Kingdom was invaded by Chola forces under Rajaraja I and led to formation of the Kingdom of Ruhuna, where the Sinhalese Kings ruled during Chola occupation.

Decline

Sadayavarman Sundara Pandyan I invaded Sri Lanka in the 13th century and defeated Chandrabanu the usurper of the Jaffna Kingdom in northern Sri Lanka. Sadayavarman Sundara Pandyan I forced Candrabhanu to submit to the Pandyan rule and to pay tributes to the Pandyan Dynasty. But later on when Candrabhanu became powerful enough he again invaded the Singhalese kingdom but he was defeated by the brother of Sadayavarman Sundara Pandyan I called Veera Pandyan I and Candrabhanu died. Sri Lanka was invaded for the 3rd time by the Pandyan Dynasty under the leadership of Arya Cakravarti who established the Jaffna kingdom.

== Transitional period (1232–1505) ==
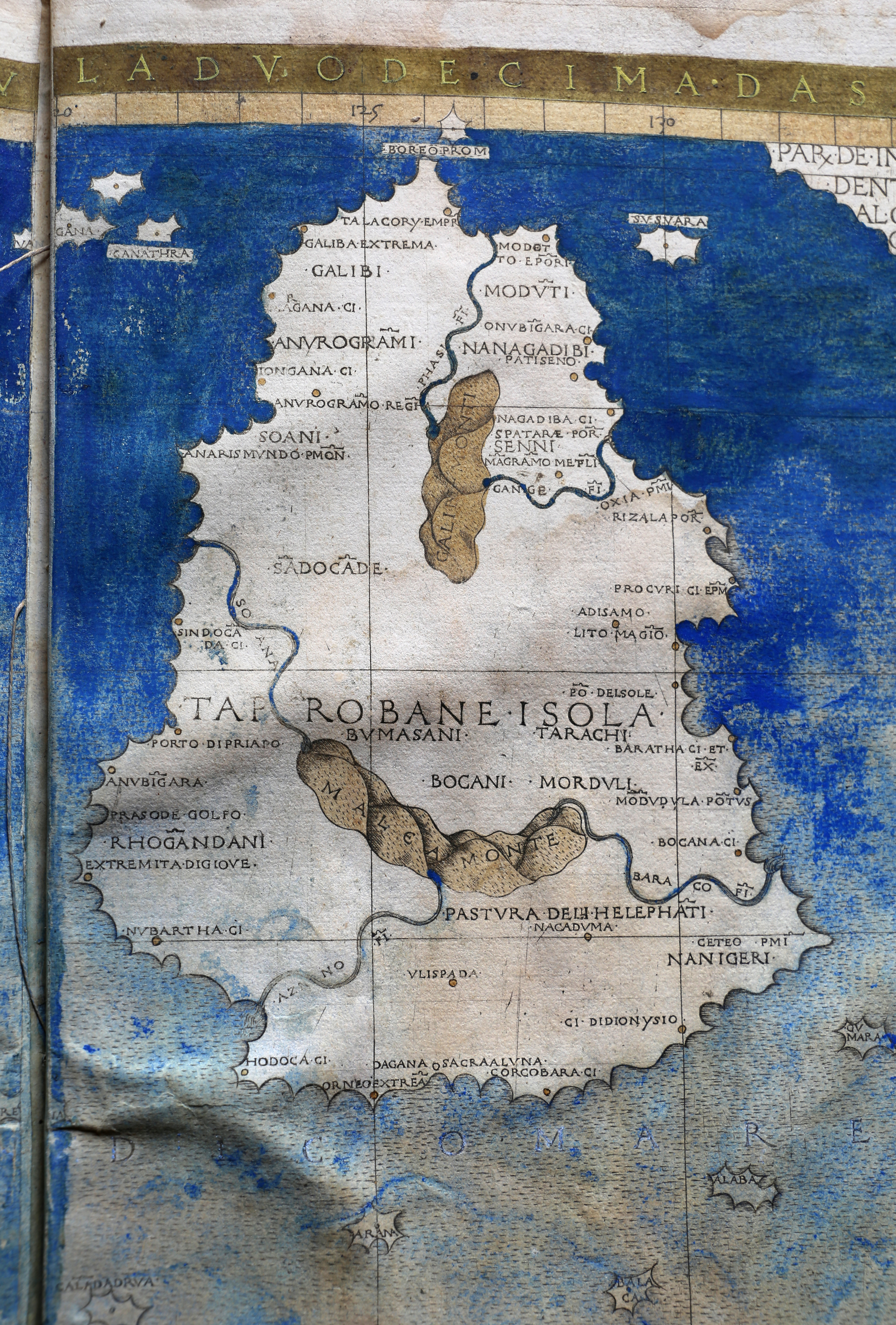
Ptolemic map of Ceylon (1482)

=== Jaffna Kingdom ===
Also known as the Aryacakravarti dynasty, was a northern kingdom centred around the Jaffna Peninsula. In 1247, the Malay kingdom of Tambralinga which was a vassal of the Srivijaya Empire led by their king Chandrabhanu briefly invaded Sri Lanka especially the Jaffna Kingdom, from Insular Southeast Asia. They were then expelled by the South Indian Pandyan Dynasty. However, this temporary invasion permanently introduced the presence of various Malayo-Polynesian merchant ethnic groups, from Sumatrans (Indonesia) to Lucoes (Philippines) into Sri Lanka.

=== Kingdom of Dambadeniya ===
After defeating Kalinga Magha, King Vijayabahu III established his Kingdom in Dambadeniya. After the death of King Vijayabahu III, his son King Parakramabahu the II ascended the throne. He defeated the Kalinga Magha after 40 year. He also constructed a temple for the tooth relic in Dambadeniya.

=== Kingdom Of Yapahuwa ===
After the death of King Parakramabahu II, his son became the King of the Dambadeniya Kingdom. Within 2 years, he was killed due to a conspiracy that had been planned in the royal palace. After that his brother King Buwanekabahu I became the king. King Buwanekabahu went on to establish Yapahuwa as his kingdom.The palace and fortress here were built by King Buvanekabahu I in the year 1273.Following the death of King Buvenakabahu in 1284, the Pandyans of South India invaded Sri Lanka once again, and succeeded in capturing Sacred Tooth Relic. Following its capture, Yapahuwa was largely abandoned and inhabited by Buddhist monks and religious ascetics.

=== Kingdom of Gampola ===
It was established by king Buwanekabahu IV, he is said to be the son of Sawulu Vijayabahu. During this time, a Muslim traveller and geographer named Ibn Battuta came to Sri Lanka and wrote a book about it. The Gadaladeniya Viharaya is the main building made in the Gampola Kingdom period. The Lankatilaka Viharaya is also a main building built in Gampola.

=== Kingdom of Kotte ===
After winning the battle, Parakramabahu VI sent an officer named Alagakkonar to check the new kingdom of Kotte.

=== Kingdom of Sitawaka ===
The kingdom of Sithawaka lasted for a short span of time during the Portuguese era.

=== Vannimai ===
Vannimai, also called Vanni Nadu, were feudal land divisions ruled by Vanniar chiefs south of the Jaffna Peninsula in northern Sri Lanka. Pandara Vanniyan allied with the Kandy Nayakars led a rebellion against the British and Dutch colonial powers in Sri Lanka in 1802. He was able to liberate Mullaitivu and other parts of northern Vanni from Dutch rule. In 1803, Pandara Vanniyan was defeated by the British and Vanni came under British rule.

== Crisis of the Sixteenth Century (1505–1594) ==
=== Portuguese intervention ===
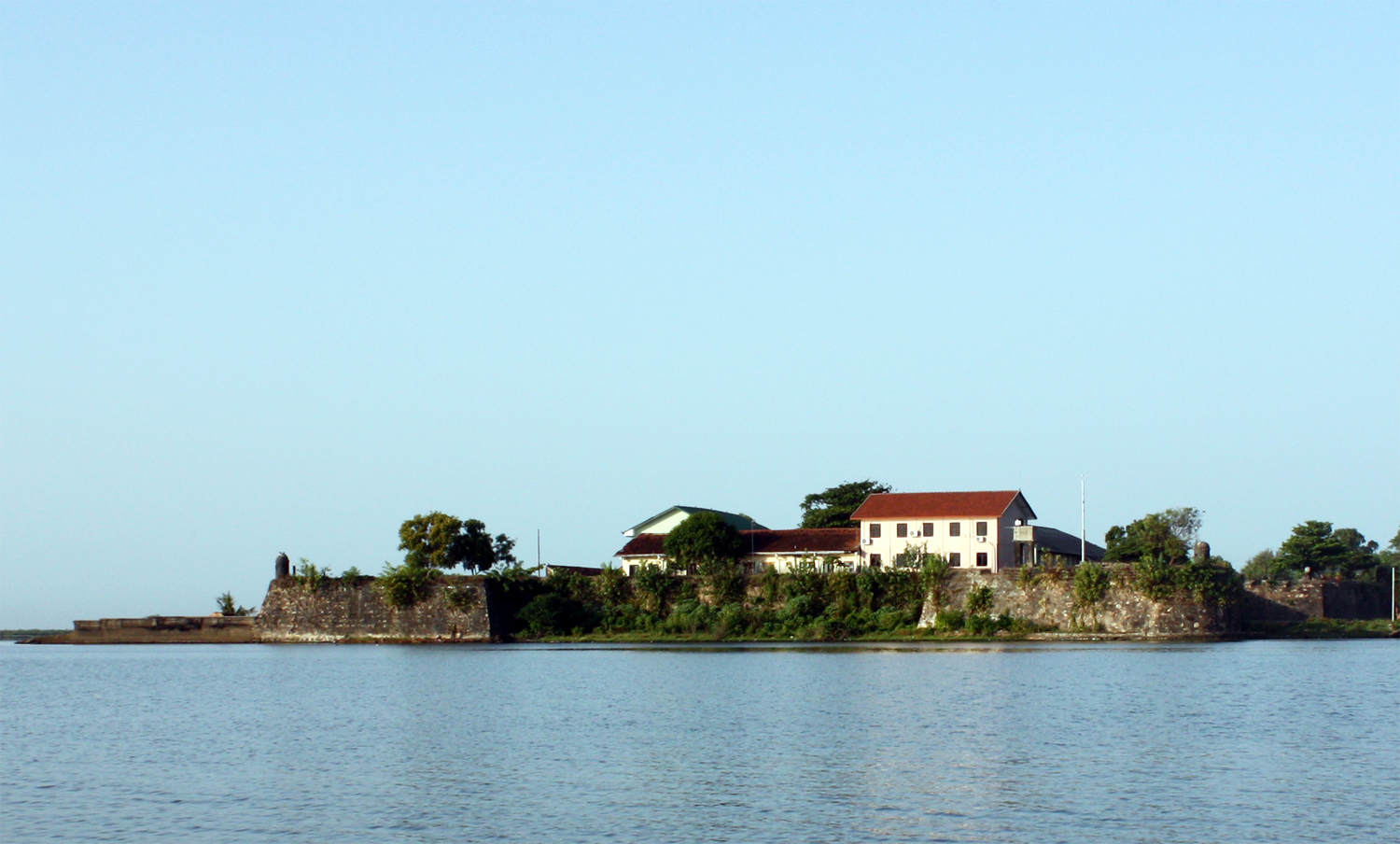
A Portuguese (later Dutch) fort in Batticaloa, Eastern Province built in the 16th century.

The first Europeans to visit Sri Lanka in modern times were the Portuguese: Lourenço de Almeida arrived in 1505 and found that the island, divided into seven warring kingdoms, was unable to fend off intruders. The Portuguese founded a fort at the port city of Colombo in 1517 and gradually extended their control over the coastal areas. In 1592, the Sinhalese moved their capital to the inland city of Kandy, a location more secure against attack from invaders. Intermittent warfare continued through the 16th century.

Many lowland Sinhalese converted to Christianity due to missionary campaigns by the Portuguese while the coastal Moors were religiously persecuted and forced to retreat to the Central highlands. The Buddhist majority disliked the Portuguese occupation and its influences, welcoming any power who might rescue them. When the Dutch captain Joris van Spilbergen landed in 1602, the king of Kandy appealed to him for help.

=== Dutch intervention ===
Colombo under VOC rule in the 18th century

Rajasinghe II, the king of Kandy, made a treaty with the Dutch in 1638 to get rid of the Portuguese who ruled most of the coastal areas of the island. The main conditions of the treaty were that the Dutch were to hand over the coastal areas they had captured to the Kandyan king in return for a Dutch trade monopoly over the island. The agreement was breached by both parties. The Dutch captured Colombo in 1656 and the last Portuguese strongholds near Jaffnapatnam in 1658. By 1660 they controlled the whole island except the land-locked kingdom of Kandy. The Dutch (Protestants) persecuted the Catholics and the remaining Portuguese settlers but left Buddhists, Hindus and Muslims alone. The Dutch levied far heavier taxes on the people than the Portuguese had done.

== Kandyan period (1594–1815) ==
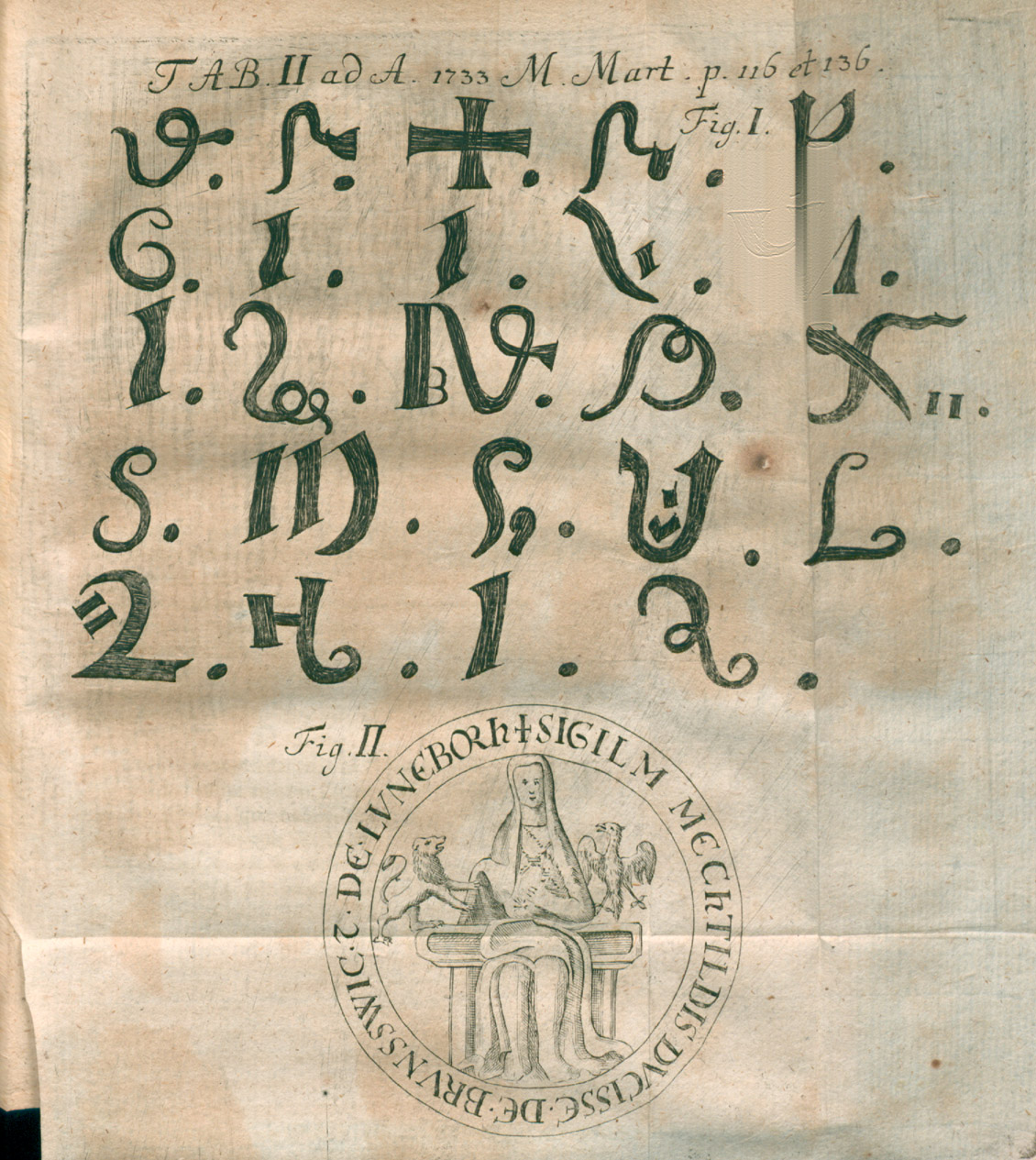
On the top: illustration from Delineatio characterum quorundam incognitorum, quos in insula Ceylano spectandos praebet tumulus quidam sepulchralis published in Acta Eruditorum, 1733

After the invasion of the Portuguese, Konappu Bandara (King Vimaladharmasuriya) won the battle and became the first king of the kingdom of Kandy. He built the Temple of the Sacred Tooth Relic. The monarchy ended with the death of the last king, Sri Vikrama Rajasinha in 1832.

== Colonial Sri Lanka (1815–1948) ==
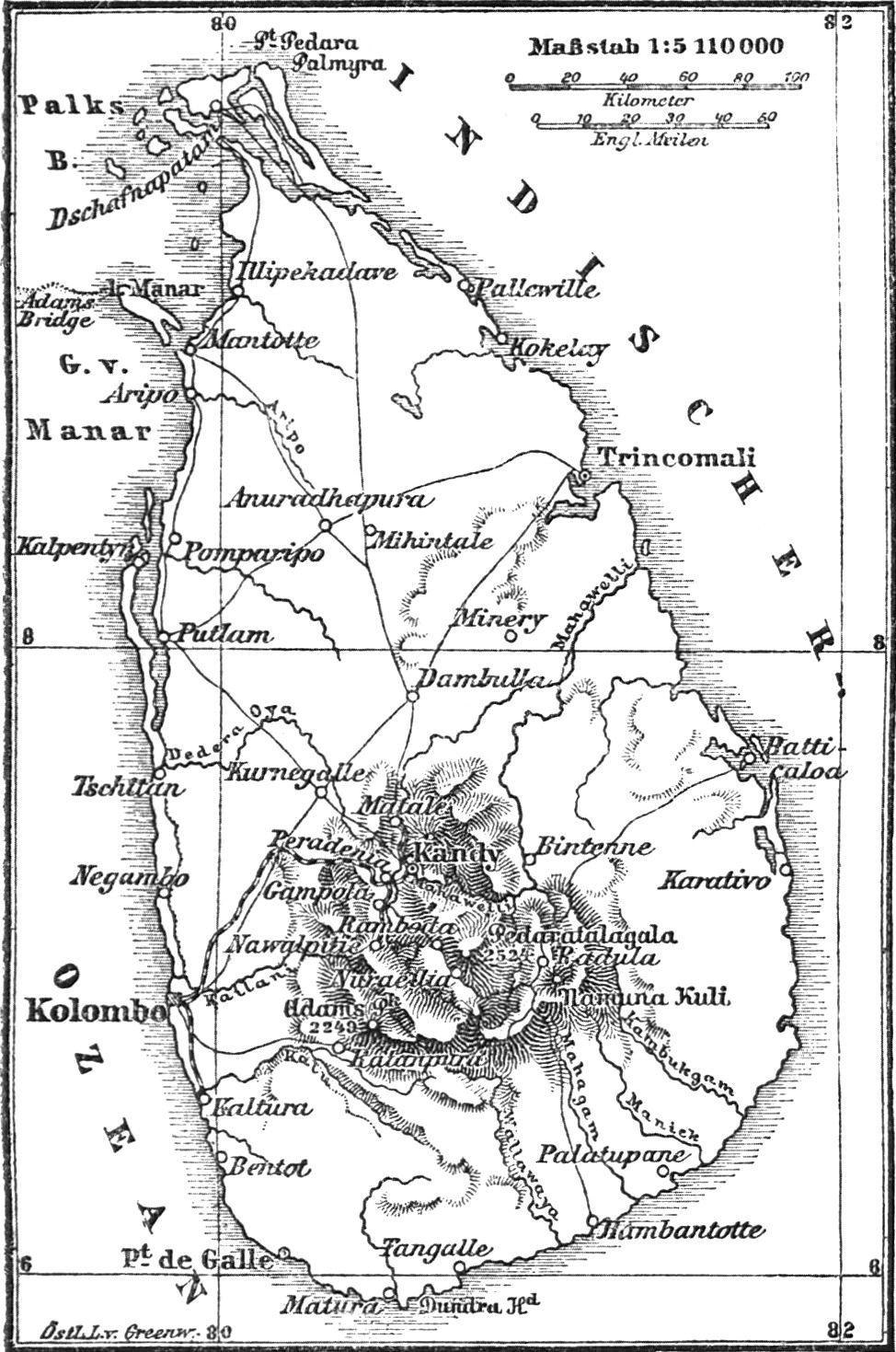
Late 19th-century German map of Ceylon.

During the Napoleonic Wars, Great Britain, fearing that French control of the Netherlands (and thus the Dutch East Indies, i.e. Indonesia) might deliver the island to the French, occupied its coastal areas with little difficulty in 1796. In 1802, the Treaty of Amiens formally ceded the Dutch part of the island to Britain and it became a crown colony. In 1803, the British invaded the Kingdom of Kandy in the first Kandyan War, but were repulsed. In 1815 Kandy was annexed in the second Kandyan War, finally ending Sri Lankan independence.

Following the suppression of the Uva Rebellion, the Kandyan peasantry were stripped of their lands by the Crown Lands (Encroachments) Ordinance No. 12 of 1840 (sometimes called the Crown Lands Ordinance or the Waste Lands Ordinance), a modern enclosure movement, and reduced to penury. The British found that the uplands of Sri Lanka were very suitable for coffee, tea and rubber cultivation. By the mid-19th century, Ceylon tea had become a staple of the British market, bringing great wealth to a small number of European tea planters. The planters imported large numbers of Tamil workers as indentured labourers from south India to work the estates, who soon made up 10% of the island's population.

The British colonial administration favoured the Eurasian Burghers, certain high-caste Sinhalese and the Tamils, who were mainly concentrated to the north of the country. Nevertheless, the British also introduced democratic elements to Sri Lanka for the first time in its history and the Burghers were given a degree of self-government as early as 1833. It was not until 1909 that constitutional development began, with a partly elected assembly, and not until 1920 that elected members outnumbered official appointees. Universal suffrage was introduced in 1931 over the protests of the Sinhalese, Tamil and Burgher elite who objected to the common people being allowed to vote.

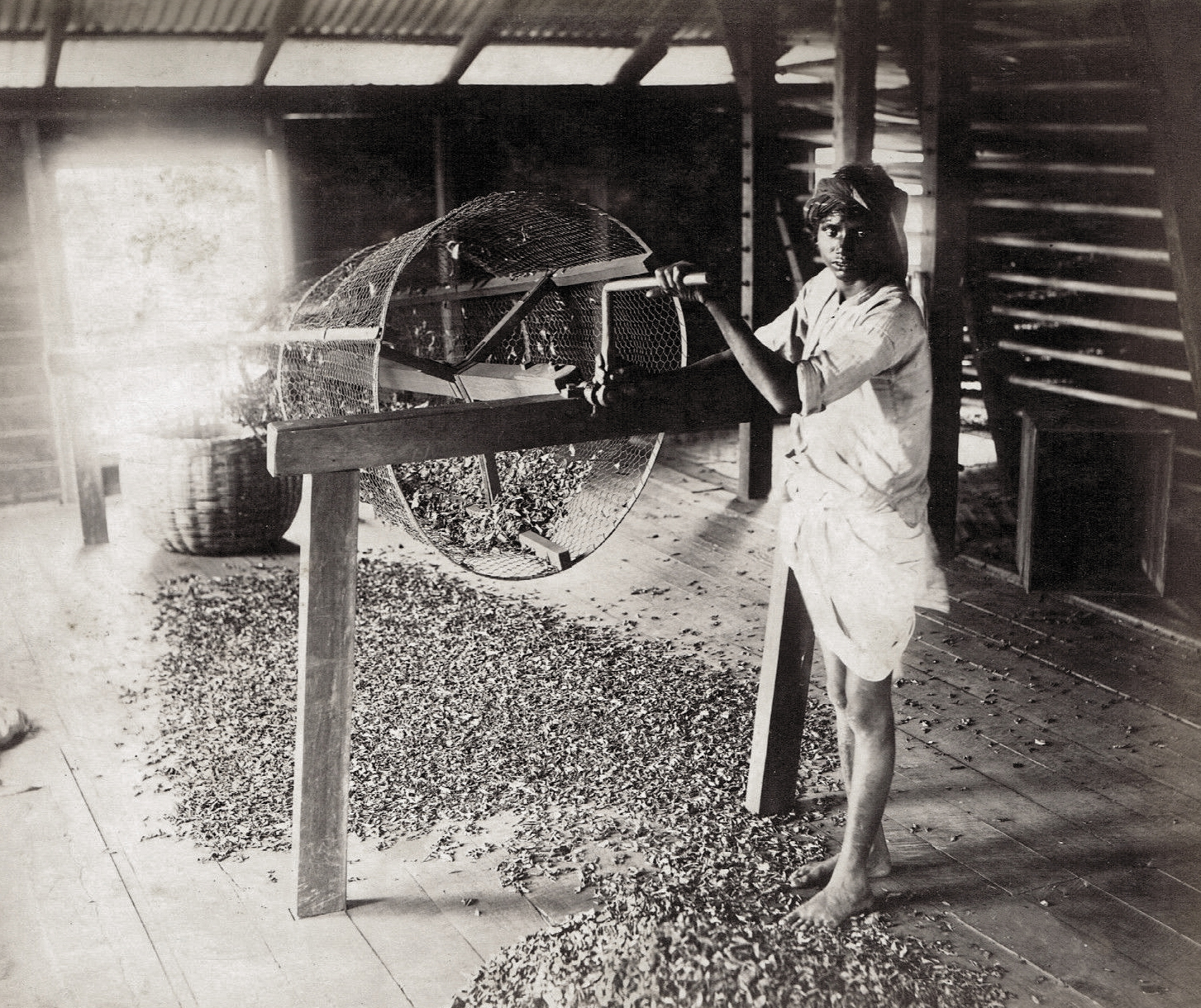
Sorting tea in Ceylon in the 1880s

=== Independence movement ===
Ceylon National Congress (CNC) was founded to agitate for greater autonomy, although the party was soon split along ethnic and caste lines. Historian K. M. de Silva has stated that the refusal of the Ceylon Tamils to accept minority status is one of the main causes of the break up of the CNC. The CNC did not seek independence (or "Swaraj"). What may be called the independence movement broke into two streams: the "constitutionalists", who sought independence by gradual modification of the status of Ceylon; and the more radical groups associated with the Colombo Youth League, Labour movement of Goonasinghe, and the Jaffna Youth Congress. These organizations were the first to raise the cry of "Swaraj" ("outright independence") following the Indian example when Jawaharlal Nehru, Sarojini Naidu and other Indian leaders visited Ceylon in 1926. The efforts of the constitutionalists led to the arrival of the Donoughmore Commission reforms in 1931 and the Soulbury Commission recommendations, which essentially upheld the 1944 draft constitution of the Board of ministers headed by D. S. Senanayake. The Marxist Lanka Sama Samaja Party (LSSP), which grew out of the Youth Leagues in 1935, made the demand for outright independence a cornerstone of their policy. Its deputies in the State Council, N.M. Perera and Philip Gunawardena, were aided in this struggle by other less radical members like Colvin R. De Silva, Leslie Goonewardene, Vivienne Goonewardene, Edmund Samarkody and Natesa Iyer. They also demanded the replacement of English as the official language by Sinhala and Tamil. The Marxist groups were a tiny minority and yet their movement was viewed with great interest by the British administration. The ineffective attempts to rouse the public against the British Raj in revolt would have led to certain bloodshed and a delay in independence. British state papers released in the 1950s show that the Marxist movement had a very negative impact on the policy makers at the Colonial office.

The Soulbury Commission was the most important result of the agitation for constitutional reform in the 1930s. The Tamil organization was by then led by G. G. Ponnambalam, who had rejected the "Ceylonese identity". Ponnamblam had declared himself a "proud Dravidian" and proclaimed an independent identity for the Tamils. He attacked the Sinhalese and criticized their historical chronicle known as the Mahavamsa. The first Sinhalese-Tamil riot came in 1939. Ponnambalam opposed universal franchise, supported the caste system, and claimed that the protection of minority rights requires that minorities (35% of the population in 1931) having an equal number of seats in parliament to that of the Sinhalese (65% of the population). This "50-50" or "balanced representation" policy became the hall mark of Tamil politics of the time. Ponnambalam also accused the British of having established colonization in "traditional Tamil areas", and having favoured the Buddhists by the Buddhist temporalities act. The Soulbury Commission rejected the submissions by Ponnambalam and even criticized what they described as their unacceptable communal character. Sinhalese writers pointed to the large immigration of Tamils to the southern urban centres, especially after the opening of the Jaffna-Colombo railway. Meanwhile, Senanayake, Baron Jayatilleke, Oliver Gunatilleke and others lobbied the Soulbury Commission without confronting them officially. The unofficial submissions contained what was to later become the draft constitution of 1944.

The close collaboration of the D. S. Senanayake government with the war-time British administration led to the support of Lord Louis Mountbatten. His dispatches and a telegram to the Colonial office supporting Independence for Ceylon have been cited by historians as having helped the Senanayake government to secure the independence of Sri Lanka. The shrewd cooperation with the British as well as diverting the needs of the war market to Ceylonese markets as a supply point, managed by Oliver Goonatilleke, also led to a very favourable fiscal situation for the newly independent government.

=== The Second World War ===
Sri Lanka was a front-line British base against the Japanese during World War II. Sri Lankan opposition to the war was led by the Marxist organizations, and the leaders of the LSSP pro-independence group were arrested by the Colonial authorities. On 5 April 1942, the Indian Ocean raid saw the Japanese Navy bomb Colombo. The Japanese attack led to the flight of Indian merchants, dominant in the Colombo commercial sector, which removed a major political problem facing the Senanayake government. Marxist leaders also escaped to India where they participated in the independence struggle there. The movement in Ceylon was minuscule, limited to the English-educated intelligentsia and trade unions, mainly in the urban centres. These groups were led by Robert Gunawardena, Philip's brother. In stark contrast to this "heroic" but ineffective approach to the war, the Senanayake government took advantage to further its rapport with the commanding elite. Ceylon became crucial to the British Empire in the war, with Lord Louis Mountbatten using Colombo as his headquarters for the Eastern Theatre. Oliver Goonatilleka successfully exploited the markets for the country's rubber and other agricultural products to replenish the treasury. Nonetheless, the Sinhalese continued to push for independence and the Sinhalese sovereignty, using the opportunities offered by the war, pushed to establish a special relationship with Britain.

Meanwhile, the Marxists, identifying the war as an imperialist sideshow and desiring a proletarian revolution, chose a path of agitation disproportionate to their negligible combat strength and diametrically opposed to the "constitutionalist" approach of Senanayake and other ethnic Sinhalese leaders. A small garrison on the Cocos Islands manned by Ceylonese mutinied against British rule. It has been claimed that the LSSP had some hand in the action, though this is far from clear. Three of the participants were the only British colony subjects to be shot for mutiny during World War II. Two members of the Governing Party, Junius Richard Jayawardene and Dudley Senanayake, held discussions with the Japanese to collaborate in fighting the British. Sri Lankans in Singapore and Malaysia formed the 'Lanka Regiment' of the anti-British Indian National Army.

The constitutionalists led by Senanayake succeeded in winning independence. The Soulbury constitution was essentially what Senanayake's board of ministers had drafted in 1944. The promise of Dominion status and independence itself had been given by the Colonial Office.

=== Independence ===
The Sinhalese leader Don Stephen Senanayake left the CNC on the issue of independence, disagreeing with the revised aim of 'the achieving of freedom', although his real reasons were more subtle. He subsequently formed the United National Party (UNP) in 1946, when a new constitution was agreed on, based on the behind-the-curtain lobbying of the Soulbury commission. At the elections of 1947, the UNP won a minority of seats in parliament, but cobbled together a coalition with the Sinhala Maha Sabha party of Solomon Bandaranaike and the Tamil Congress of G.G. Ponnambalam. The successful inclusions of the Tamil-communalist leader Ponnambalam, and his Sinhalese counterpart Bandaranaike were a remarkable political balancing act by Senanayake. The vacuum in Tamil Nationalist politics, created by Ponnamblam's transition to a moderate, opened the field for the Tamil Arasu Kachchi ("Federal party"), a Tamil sovereignty party led by S. J. V. Chelvanaykam who was the lawyer son of a Christian minister.

== Sri Lanka (1948–present) ==
=== Dominion ===
Dominion status followed on 4 February 1948 with military treaties with Britain, as the upper ranks of the armed forces were initially British, and British air and sea bases remaining intact. This was later raised to independence itself and Senanayake became the first Prime Minister of Sri Lanka. In 1949, with the concurrence of the leaders of the Ceylon Tamils, the UNP government disenfranchised the Indian Tamil plantation workers. This was the price that Senanayake had to pay to obtain the support of the Kandyan Sinhalese, who felt threatened by the demographics of the tea estates where the inclusion of the "Indian Tamils" would have meant electoral defeat for the Kandyan leaders. Senanayake died in 1952 after falling from a horse and was succeeded by his son Dudley Senanayake, the then minister of Agriculture. In 1953 he resigned following a massive Hartal ("general strike") by the Left parties against the UNP. He was followed by John Kotelawala, a senior politician and an uncle of Dudley Senanayake. Kotelawala did not have the enormous personal prestige or the adroit political acumen of D. S. Senanayake. He brought to the fore the issue of national languages that D. S. Senanayake had adroitly kept on the back burner, antagonising the Tamils and the Sinhalese by stating conflicting policies with regard to the status of Sinhala and Tamil as official languages. He also antagonized the Buddhist lobby by attacking politically active Buddhist Monks who were Bandaranaike's supporters.

In 1956, Sinhala was established as the official language, with Tamil as a second language. Appeals to the Judicial Committee of the Privy Council in London were abolished and plantations were nationalised to fulfil the election pledges of the Marxist program and to "prevent the ongoing dis-investment by the owning companies". In 1956, the Sinhala Only Act came into being. This established Sinhala as the first and preferred language in commerce and education. The Act took effect immediately. As a consequence vast numbers of people, mostly Burghers, left the country to live abroad as they felt discriminated against. In 1958, the first major riots between Sinhalese and Tamils flared up in Colombo as a direct result of the government's language policy.

1971 Uprising

The leftist Sinhalese Janatha Vimukthi Peramuna drew worldwide attention when it launched an insurrection against the Bandaranayake government in April 1971. Although the insurgents were young, poorly armed, and inadequately trained, they succeeded in seizing and holding major areas in Southern and Central provinces before they were defeated by the security forces. Their attempt to seize power created a major crisis for the government and forced a fundamental reassessment of the nation's security needs.

The movement was started in the late 1960s by Rohana Wijeweera, who became a Maoist and participated in the pro-Beijing branch of the Ceylon Communist Party, He was increasingly at odds with party leaders and impatient with its lack of revolutionary purpose. His success in working with youth groups and his popularity as a public speaker led him to organize his own movement in 1967. Initially identified simply as the New Left, this group drew on students and unemployed youths from rural areas, most of them in the sixteen-to-twenty-five-age-group. Many of these new recruits were members of minority so called 'lower' castes (Karava and Durava) who felt that their economic interests had been neglected by the nation's leftist coalitions. The standard program of indoctrination, the so-called Five Lectures, included discussions of Indian imperialism, the growing economic crisis, the failure of the island's communist and socialist parties, and the need for a sudden, violent seizure of power. Between 1967 and 1970, the group expanded rapidly, gaining control of the student socialist movement at a number of major university campuses and winning recruits and sympathizers within the armed forces. Some of these latter supporters actually provided sketches of police stations, airports, and military facilities that were important to the initial success of the revolt. In order to draw the newer members more tightly into the organization and to prepare them for a coming confrontation, Wijeweera opened "education camps" in several remote areas along the south and southwestern coasts. These camps provided training in Marxism–Leninism and in basic military skills.

While developing secret cells and regional commands, Wijeweera's group also began to take a more public role during the elections of 1970. His cadres campaigned openly for the United Front of Sirimavo R. D. Bandaranaike, but at the same time they distributed posters and pamphlets promising violent rebellion if Bandaranaike did not address the interests of the proletariat. In a manifesto issued during this period, the group used the name Janatha Vimukthi Peramuna for the first time. Because of the subversive tone of these publications, the United National Party government had Wijeweera detained during the elections, but the victorious Bandaranaike ordered his release in July 1970. In the politically tolerant atmosphere of the next few months, as the new government attempted to win over a wide variety of unorthodox leftist groups, the JVP intensified both the public campaign and the private preparations for a revolt. Although their group was relatively small, the members hoped to immobilize the government by selective kidnapping and sudden, simultaneous strikes against the security forces throughout the island. Some of the necessary weapons had been bought with funds supplied by the members. For the most part, however, they relied on raids against police stations and army camps to secure weapons, and they manufactured their own bombs. Wijeweera was arrested and sent to Jaffna Prison, where he remained throughout the revolt. In response to his arrest and the growing pressure of police investigations, other JVP leaders decided to act immediately, and they agreed to begin the uprising at 11:00 P.M. on 5 April 1971. Rebel groups armed with shotguns, bombs, and Molotov cocktails launched simultaneous attacks against seventy- four police stations around the island and cut power to major urban areas. The attacks were most successful in the south. By 10 April, the rebels had taken control of Matara District and the city of Ambalangoda in Galle District and came close to capturing the remaining areas of Southern Province.

The new government was ill-prepared for the crisis that confronted it. Bandaranaike was caught off guard by the scale of the uprising and was forced to call on India to provide basic security functions. Indian frigates patrolled the coast and Indian troops guarded Bandaranaike International Airport at Katunayaka while Indian Air Force helicopters assisted the counteroffensive. Sri Lanka's all-volunteer army had no combat experience since World War II and no training in counterinsurgency warfare. Although the police were able to defend some areas unassisted, in many places the government deployed personnel from all three services in a ground force capacity. Royal Ceylon Air Force helicopters delivered relief supplies to beleaguered police stations while combined service patrols drove the insurgents out of urban areas and into the countryside. After two weeks of fighting, the government regained control of all but a few remote areas. In both human and political terms, the cost of the victory was high: an estimated 10,000 insurgents—many of them in their teens—died in the conflict, and the army was widely perceived to have used excessive force. In order to win over an alienated population and to prevent a prolonged conflict, Bandaranaike offered amnesties in May and June 1971, and only the top leaders were actually imprisoned. Wijeweera, who was already in detention at the time of the uprising, was given a twenty-year sentence and the JVP was proscribed.

Under the six years of emergency rule that followed the uprising, the JVP remained dormant. After the victory of the United National Party in the 1977 elections, however, the new government attempted to broaden its mandate with a period of political tolerance. Wijeweera was freed, the ban was lifted, and the JVP entered the arena of legal political competition. As a candidate in the 1982 presidential elections, Wijeweera finished fourth, with more than 250,000 votes (as compared with Jayewardene's 3.2 million). During this period, and especially as the Tamil conflict to the north became more intense, there was a marked shift in the ideology and goals of the JVP. Initially Marxist in orientation, and claiming to represent the oppressed of both the Tamil and Sinhalese communities, the group emerged increasingly as a Sinhalese nationalist organization opposing any compromise with the Tamil insurgency. This new orientation became explicit in the anti-Tamil riots of July 1983. Because of its role in inciting violence, the JVP was once again banned and its leadership went underground.

The group's activities intensified in the second half of 1987 in the wake of the Indo-Sri Lankan Accord. The prospect of Tamil autonomy in the north together with the presence of Indian troops stirred up a wave of Sinhalese nationalism and a sudden growth of antigovernment violence. During 1987 a new group emerged that was an offshoot of the JVP—the Patriotic Liberation Organization (Deshapremi Janatha Viyaparaya—DJV). The DJV claimed responsibility for the August 1987 assassination attempts against the president and prime minister. In addition, the group launched a campaign of intimidation against the ruling party, killing more than seventy members of Parliament between July and November.

Along with the group's renewed violence came a renewed fear of infiltration of the armed forces. Following the successful raid of the Pallekelle army camp in May 1987, the government conducted an investigation that resulted in the discharge of thirty-seven soldiers suspected of having links with the JVP. In order to prevent a repetition of the 1971 uprising, the government considered lifting the ban on the JVP in early 1988 and permitting the group to participate again in the political arena. With Wijeweera still underground, however, the JVP had no clear leadership at the time, and it was uncertain whether it had the cohesion to mount any coordinated offensive, either military or political, against the government.

=== Republic ===
The Democratic Socialist Republic of Sri Lanka was established on 22 May 1972 with the Sri Lankan Constitution of 1972.

By 1977, the voters were tired of Bandaranaike's socialist policies and elections returned the UNP to power under Junius Jayewardene, on a manifesto pledging a market economy and "a free ration of 8 seers (kilograms) of cereals". The SLFP and the left-wing parties were virtually wiped out in Parliament, although they garnered 40% of the popular vote, leaving the Tamil United Liberation Front led by Appapillai Amirthalingam as the official opposition. This created a dangerous ethnic division in Sri Lankan politics.

After coming to power, Jayewardene directed the rewriting of the constitution. The document that was produced, the new Constitution of 1978, drastically altered the nature of governance in Sri Lanka. It replaced the previous Westminster style, parliamentary government with a new presidential system modeled after France, with a powerful chief executive. The president was to be elected by direct suffrage for a six-year term and was empowered to appoint, with parliamentary approval, the prime minister and to preside over cabinet meetings. Jayewardene became the first president under the new Constitution and assumed direct control of the government machinery and party.

The new regime ushered in an era that did not augur well for the SLFP. Jayewardene's UNP government accused former prime minister Bandaranaike of abusing her power while in office from 1970 to 1977. In October 1980, Bandaranaike's privilege to engage in politics was removed for a period of seven years, and the SLFP was forced to seek a new leader. After a long and divisive battle, the party chose her son, Anura. Anura Bandaranaike was soon thrust into the role of the keeper of his father's legacy, but he inherited a political party torn apart by factionalism and reduced to a minimal role in the Parliament.

The 1978 Constitution included substantial concessions to Tamil sensitivities. Although TULF did not participate in framing the Constitution, it continued to sit in Parliament in the hope of negotiating a settlement to the Tamil problem. TULF also agreed to Jayewardene's proposal of an all-party conference to resolve the island's ethnic problems. Jayewardene's UNP offered other concessions in a bid to secure peace. Sinhala remained the official language and the language of administration throughout Sri Lanka, but Tamil was given a new "national language" status. Tamil was to be used in a number of administrative and educational circumstances. Jayewardene also eliminated a major Tamil grievance by abrogating the "standardization" policy of the United Front government, which had made university admission criteria for Tamils more difficult. In addition, he offered many top-level positions, including that of minister of justice, to Tamil civil servants.

While TULF, in conjunction with the UNP, pressed for the all-party conference, the Tamil Tigers escalated their terrorist attacks, which provoked Sinhalese backlash against Tamils and generally precluded any successful accommodation. In reaction to the assassination of a Jaffna police inspector, the Jayewardene government declared an emergency and dispatched troops, who were given an unrealistic six months to eradicate the terrorist threat.

The government passed the Prevention of Terrorism (Temporary Provisions) Act in 1979. The act was enacted as a temporary measure, but it later became permanent legislation. The International Commission of Jurists, Amnesty International, and other human rights organizations condemned the act as being incompatible with democratic traditions. Despite the act, the number of terrorist acts increased. Guerrillas began to hit targets of high symbolic value such as post offices and police outposts, provoking government counterattacks. As an increasing number of civilians were caught in the fighting, Tamil support widened for the "boys", as the guerrillas began to be called. Other large, well-armed groups began to compete with LTTE. The better-known included the People's Liberation Organization of Tamil Eelam, Tamil Eelam Liberation Army, and the Tamil Eelam Liberation Organization. Each of these groups had forces measured in the hundreds if not thousands. The government claimed that many of the terrorists were operating from training camps in India's Tamil Nadu State. The Indian government repeatedly denied this claim. With the level of violence mounting, the possibility of negotiation became increasingly distant.

Internal conflict

In July 1983, communal riots took place due to the ambush and killing of 13 Sri Lankan Army soldiers by the Tamil Tigers using the voters list, which contained the exact addresses of Tamils. The Tamil community faced a backlash from Sinhalese rioters including the destruction of shops, homes, savage beatings and the burning of Jaffna library. A few Sinhalese kept Tamil neighbours in their homes to protect them from the rioters. During these riots the government did nothing to control the mob. Conservative government estimates put the death toll at 400, while the real death toll is believed to be around 3000. Also around 18,000 Tamil homes and another 5,000 homes were destroyed, with 150,000 leaving the country resulting in a Tamil diaspora in Canada, the UK, Australia and other western countries.

In elections held on 17 November 2005 Mahinda Rajapakse was elected president after defeating Ranil Wickremasinghe by a mere 180,000 votes. He appointed Wickremanayake as Prime Minister and Mangala Samaraweera as Foreign Minister. Negotiations with the LTTE stalled and a low-intensity conflict began. The violence dropped off after talks in February but escalated again in April and the conflict continued until the military defeat of the LTTE in May 2009.

The Sri Lanka government declared total victory on 18 May 2009. On 19 May 2009, the Sri Lankan military led by General Sarath Fonseka, effectively concluded its 26-year operation against the LTTE, its military forces recaptured all remaining LTTE controlled territories in the Northern Province including Killinochchi (2 January), the Elephant Pass (9 January) and ultimately the entire district of Mullaitivu.

On 22 May 2009, Sri Lankan Defence Secretary Gotabhaya Rajapaksa confirmed that 6,261 personnel of the Sri Lankan Armed Forces had died and 29,551 were wounded during the Eelam War IV since July 2006. Brigadier Udaya Nanayakkara added that approximately 22,000 LTTE fighters had died during this time. The war caused the death of 80 000-100 000 civilians. There are allegations that war crimes were committed by the Sri Lankan military and the rebel Liberation Tigers of Tamil Eelam (Tamil Tigers) during the Sri Lankan Civil War, particularly during the final months of the Eelam War IV phase in 2009. The alleged war crimes include attacks on civilians and civilian buildings by both sides; executions of combatants and prisoners by both sides; enforced disappearances by the Sri Lankan military and paramilitary groups backed by them; acute shortages of food, medicine, and clean water for civilians trapped in the war zone; and child recruitment by the Tamil Tigers.

Several International bodies including UNROW Human Rights Impact Litigation Clinic, Human Rights Watch and Permanent People's Tribunal have raised allegations on the Sri Lankan Government for genocide against Tamils. On 10 December 2013, Permanent People's Tribunal unanimously ruled Sri Lanka guilty of the crime of genocide against the Tamil people.

=== Post-conflict period ===
Presidential elections were completed in January 2010. Mahinda Rajapaksa won the elections with 59% of the votes, defeating General Sarath Fonseka who was the united opposition candidate. Fonseka was subsequently arrested and convicted by court martial.

In January 2015 presidential elections Mahinda Rajapaksa was defeated by the common candidate of opposition, Maithripala Sirisena, and Rajapaksa's attempted return was thwarted in the parliamentary election the same year by Ranil Wickremesinghe This resulted in a unity government between the UNP and SLFP

==== Easter Sunday Attacks ====
On 21 April 2019, Easter Sunday, three churches in Sri Lanka and three luxury hotels in the commercial capital, Colombo, were targeted in a series of coordinated Islamic terrorist suicide bombings. A total of 269 people were killed, including at least 45 foreign nationals, three police officers, and eight bombers, and at least 500 were injured. All eight of the suicide bombers in the attacks were Sri Lankan citizens associated with National Thowheeth Jama'ath, a local militant Islamist group with suspected foreign ties, previously known for attacks against Buddhists and Sufis.

==== Rajapaksa brothers in power ====
Sri Lankan President, Maithripala Sirisena, decided not to seek re-election in 2019. In November 2019 presidential election former wartime defence chief Gotabaya Rajapaksa was elected as the new President of Sri Lanka. He was the candidate for the SLPP, the Sinhalese-Buddhist nationalist party, and brother of former president Mahinda Rajapaksa. In August 2020 parliamentary elections the party, led by the Rajapaksa brothers, got a landslide victory. Mahinda Rajapaksa, former Sri Lankan president and brother of current president, became the new Prime Minister of Sri Lanka.

Since 2010, Sri Lanka has witnessed a sharp rise in foreign debt The onset of the COVID-19 pandemic-induced global recession accelerated the crisis and by 2021, the foreign debt rose to 101% of the nation's GDP, causing an economic crisis. In March 2022, spontaneous and organized protests by both political parties and non-partisan groups over the government's mishandling of the economy were reported from several areas. On 31 March, a large group gathered around the residence of Gotabaya Rajapaksa to protest against the power cuts that had reached over 12-hours a day. The protest was initially spontaneous peaceful protest by citizens until the police attacked the protestors with tear gas and water cannons and the protestors burned down a bus carrying riot control troops. The government declared a curfew in Colombo.

On 9 July 2022 after many months of protests, the President's residence was stormed by protesters. The President escaped and then fled the country on a military jet to the Maldives. His departure followed months of mass protests over soaring prices and a lack of food and fuel. The country's foreign currency reserves have dipped low and the country has missed debt interest payments. President Gotabaya Rajapaksa appointed Prime Minister Ranil Wickremesinghe as acting president, who declared a state of emergency in western providences. Thousands of Sri Lankan protesters streamed the streets of the capital, Colombo.

In July 2022, protesters occupied the President's House in Colombo, causing Rajapaksa to flee and Prime Minister Ranil Wickremesinghe to announce his own willingness to resign. About a week later, Parliament elected Wickremesinghe as president, on 20 July.

==== Since 2024 ====
On 23 September 2024, Anura Kumara Dissanayake was sworn in as Sri Lanka's new president after winning the presidential election as a left-wing candidate. Later on, Harini Amarasuriya was sworn in as the new Prime Minister of Sri Lanka, became the third woman to hold the role. On 14 November 2024, President Anura Kumara Dissanayake's National People's Power (NPP), a left-leaning alliance, received a two-thirds majority in parliament in Sri Lankan parliamentary election.

== See also ==
- History of Asia
  - Outline of South Asian history
- Sinhalese monarchy
  - List of Sri Lankan monarchs
- Architecture of ancient Sri Lanka
  - Ancient constructions of Sri Lanka
  - Sri Lankan irrigation network
- Politics of Sri Lanka
  - List of presidents of Sri Lanka
  - List of prime ministers of Sri Lanka
