= List of caves in Sri Lanka =

This is a list of caves in Sri Lanka.

A cave or cavern is a natural void in the ground, specifically a space large enough for a human to enter. Caves often form by the weathering of rock and often extend deeply underground. The word cave can also refer to much smaller openings such as sea caves, rock shelters, and grottos, though strictly speaking a cave is exogene, meaning it is deeper than its opening is wide, and a rock shelter is endogene.

== List of caves ==
Cave	District	Province	Location	Length		Notes	Ref
Cave	District	Province	Location	m	ft	Notes	Ref
Andirilena Cave	Galle	Southern	06°13′04″N 80°20′07″E	500	1,640		
Aluvihare Rock Temple	Matale	Central	07°29′50″N 80°37′19″E			Cave temple	
Batatotalena Cave	Ratnapura	Sabaragamuwa	06°48′00″N 80°22′00″E	25	82	Cave temple	
Belilena Cave	Kegalle	Sabaragamuwa	07°00′08″N 80°26′08″E				
Bogoda Cave	Badulla	Uva	06°30′59.06″N 80°38′36.33″E	15	49		
Dambulla Cave Temple	Matale	Central	07°51′24″N 80°38′57″E			Cave temple	
Fa Hien Cave	Kalutara	Western	06°36′6″N 80°13′6″E				
Hunugalagala Limestone Cave	Badulla	Uva	06°45′55″N 80°53′21″E				
Kuragala	Ratnapura	Sabaragamuwa	06°37′44.4″N 80°51′51.9″E	42	138	Cave ruins	
Lahugala Cave	Ampara	Eastern	06°52′41.1″N 81°45′10.6″E	12	41		
Mahalenama Cave	Ampara	Eastern	6°38′52.99″N 81°42′5.07″E				
Nitro Cave		Central	07°25′03.8″N 80°52′13.9″E	60	197		
Pannila Cave	Ratnapura	Sabaragamuwa	06°28′47.07″N 80°32′40.55″E	550	1,804		
Rawana Ella Cave	Badulla	Uva	06°50′27″N 81°3′16″E	46	151	Cave temple	
Rotupihilla Cave	Nuwara Eliya	Central	07°8′33.19″N 80°46′0.11″E				
Sithripura Cave	Badulla	Uva					
Waulpane Cave	Ratnapura	Sabaragamuwa	06°25′31″N 80°43′58.58″E	122	400		

== See also ==
- Geography of Sri Lanka
- List of caves
