= Waulpane Cave =

Cave in the Bulutota Rakwana range, Sri Lanka

- Wavula Pane Cave
- Location within Sri Lanka
- Interactive map of Waulpane Cave
- Location: Udugama
- Coordinates: 6.4249°N 80.7328°E
- Depth: 300 m (980 ft)
- Length: 139 m (457 ft)
- Height variation: 12–14 m (40–45 ft)
- Elevation: 278 m (912 ft)
- Features: stalactites, stalagmites, internal waterfall

Waulpane Cave (Sinhala: වවුල්පනේ හුණුගල් ගුහාව) or Wavula Pane Cave is a cave located in Bulutota Rakwana range, northwest of Embilipitiya one of the archeological sites located in Sri Lanka.

The cave is located in the Ratnapura District, in the Kolonne Korale, about 278 metres (912 ft) above sea level. The meaning of Wavul Pane (Sinhalese name) is Cave of Bats. Approximately over 250,000 bats inhabit the cave.

== See also ==
- List of caves in Sri Lanka
- Balangoda Man
