= Andirilena Cave =

Cave in Sri Lanka

- Interactive map of Andirilena Cave
- Location: Udugama
- Coordinates: 06°13′04.36″N 80°20′07.54″E

The Andirilena Cave is a cave located 4 km (2.5 mi) from Udugama, in the Galle District of Sri Lanka (25 km (16 mi) from Belihuloya towards Colombo on the Balangoda–Colombo road). The cave system begins from a 4 ft (1.2 m) opening, before splitting into two main channels (and more smaller caves), before joining back after approximately 500 m (1,600 ft) in.

== See also ==
- Geography of Sri Lanka
- List of caves in Sri Lanka
