= Balangoda Man =

Humans who lived 38,000 years ago in Sri Lanka

Balangoda Man refers to hominins from Sri Lanka's late Quaternary period. The term was initially coined to refer to anatomically modern Homo sapiens from sites near Balangoda that were responsible for the island's Mesolithic 'Balangoda Culture'. The earliest evidence of Balangoda Man from archaeological sequences at caves and other sites dates back to 38,000 BCE, and from excavated skeletal remains to 30,000 BC, which is also the earliest reliably dated record of anatomically modern humans in South Asia. Cultural remains discovered alongside the skeletal fragments include geometric microliths dating to 28,500 BC, which together with some sites in Africa is the earliest record of such stone tools.

Balangoda Man is estimated to have had thick skulls, prominent supraorbital ridges, depressed noses, heavy jaws, short necks and conspicuously large teeth. Metrical and morphometric features of skeletal fragments extracted from cave sites that were occupied during different periods have indicated a rare biological affinity over a time frame of roughly 16,000 years, and the likelihood of a partial biological continuum to the present-day Vedda indigenous people.

== Origin ==
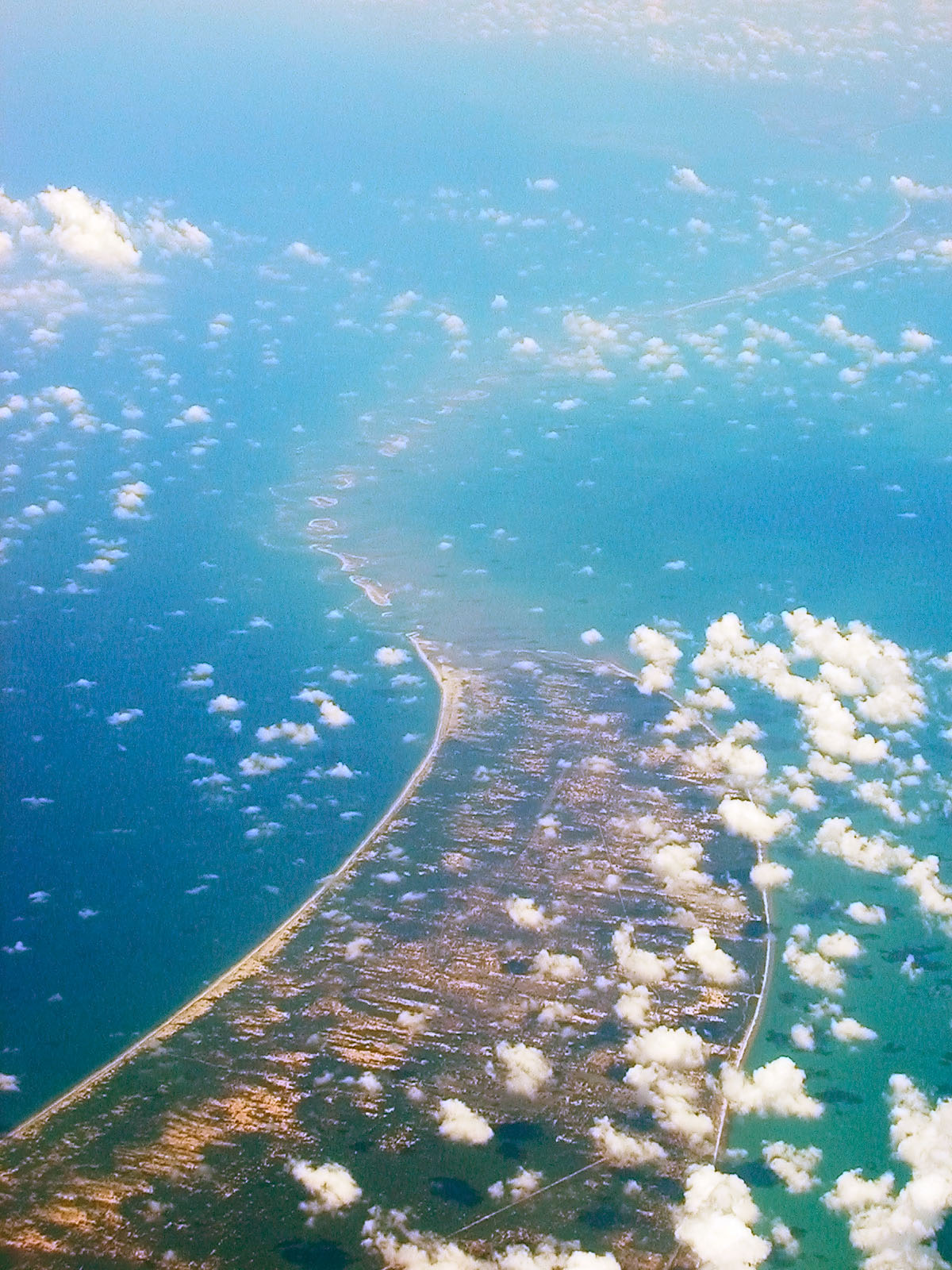
Rama's Bridge, pictured heading across the Palk Strait into India (top right), is a remnant of a recurring land bridge that first appeared at least 500,000 BP.

Archeological data from the Late Pleistocene in South Asia is vital for our understanding of the evolution of modern human behavior and how early humans spread through the Old World. In prehistoric times, the movement of human and faunal populations from the Indian mainland to Sri Lanka and back took place over the continental shelf shared between the two countries, which from around 7000 BP has been submerged below the Palk Strait and Adam's Bridge. Being only around 70 m deep, significant reductions in sea level due to climate change, in at least the past 500,000 years, periodically caused the continental shelf to be exposed, forming a land bridge approximately 100 km wide and 50 km long.

From an analysis of coastal deposits near Bundala in the Hambantota district in Sri Lanka, paleontologists have gathered secure evidence of prehistoric fauna in Sri Lanka by 125,000 BP. Excavations of the area have also yielded tools of quartz and chert probably belonging to the Middle Palaeolithic period. Consequently, some believe in the possibility that there were prehistoric humans in Sri Lanka from 500,000 BP or earlier, and consider it likely that they were on the island by 300,000 BP. Further analysis of ancient coastal sands in the north and southeast of the island may yield evidence of such early hominids.

From South Asia in general, there is secure evidence of such early settlement. Although not regarded as an anatomically modern Homo sapiens, a skull from the Central Narmada Valley in Madhya Pradesh, India, referred to as Narmada Man, is the first authenticated discovery of a late Middle Pleistocene (around 200,000 BP) hominid from South Asia. The discovery has sparked much debate regarding where it belongs in the taxonomic organisation of Pleicestone hominids. Its morphometric traits do not easily match those of Homo erectus, but they correlate with hominid specimens called archaic Homo sapiens, which include pre-Neanderthals from Europe and West Asia. In 1955, P. E. P. Deraniyagala suggested the name "H. s. balangodensis". Other classifications of the skull include Homo heidelbergensis and evolved Homo erectus, but the latter has been disputed by some as having no taxonomic meaning.

== Sri Lankan skeletal and cultural discoveries ==
Compared to the earlier Sri Lankan fossils, the island's fossil records from around 40,000 BP onwards are much more complete. Excavated fossils of skeletal and cultural remains from this period provide the earliest records of anatomically modern Homo sapiens in South Asia, and some of the earliest evidence for the use of a specific type of stone tool.

Geometric microliths

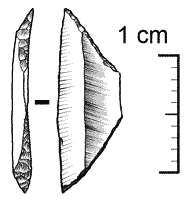
Trapezoid

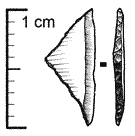
Triangular

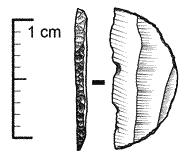
Lunate

The Fa Hien Cave in the Kalutara district in Sri Lanka, one of the largest caves on the island, has yielded some of the earliest such fossils. Radiometric dating from excavated charcoal samples indicated that the cave was occupied from 34,000 to 5,400 BP, a period that was found to be consistent with the occupational levels of some other caves on the island. Dates from cultural sequences at the cave suggested a slightly earlier settlement from 38,000 BP. The oldest skeletal remains unearthed from Fa Hien Cave were that of a child with an associated radiocarbon dating of 30,000 BP.

Caves in Batadomba lena, 460 m above sea level in the foothills of Sri Pada (Adam's Peak), have also yielded several important ancient remains. The first excavation of the cave floor in the late 1930s unearthed skeletal fragments of a child and several adults. Excavations in 1981 yielded more complete human skeletons from the sixth stratum (a layer of internally consistent sedimentary soil or rock) which were radiocarbon dated from associated charcoal samples to 16,000 BP. Excavations of the seventh stratum in the following year produced further human remains along with charcoal and 17 geometric microliths, i.e. 1–4 cm long triangular, trapezoid or lunate stone tools made of flint or chert that form, among other artifacts, the end points of hunting weapons such as spears and arrows. Radiometric tests on the charcoal placed the tools to around 28,500 BP.

Along with some sites in Africa that have also revealed geometric microliths from contexts earlier than 27,000 BP, those recovered from caves in Beli lena in Kitulgala and Batadomba lena, and from two coastal sites in Bundala have the earliest dates for geometric microliths in the world. The earliest date for the use of microlithic technology in India of 24,500 BP, in the Patne site in Maharashtra, only slightly postdates the first appearance in Sri Lanka. Such early evidence of microlithic industries in various sites in South Asia supports the view that at least some of these industries emerged regionally, perhaps to deal with challenging climatic, social or demographic conditions, rather than being brought in from elsewhere. In Europe, the earliest dates for microliths seem to start from around 12,000 BP, though there does appear to be a trend towards microlithic blade production from 20,000 BP.

Mesolithic sites in the Sabaragamuva and Uva provinces in Sri Lanka confirmed that microlithic technology continued on the island, albeit at a lower frequency, until the onset of the historical period, traditionally the 6th century BC. Cultural sequences at rock shelters showed that microliths were gradually replaced by other types of tools including grinding stones, pestles, mortars, and pitted hammers-stones towards the late Pleistocene, specifically 13,000-14,000 BP.

Other sites that have revealed ancient human skeletal fragments are the Beli lena cave and Bellanbandi Palassa in the Ratnapura district. Carbon samples corresponding to the fragments were dated to respectively 12,000 BP for the former site and 6,500 BP for the latter, suggesting that the island may have been relatively continuously occupied during this time frame.

=== Physical traits and cultural practices ===
Certain samples of Balangoda Man were estimated to be 174 cm tall for males and 166 cm tall for females, a significantly higher figure than modern day Sri Lankan populations. They also had thick skull-bones, prominent supraorbital ridges, depressed noses, heavy jaws, short necks and conspicuously large teeth.

Apart from the microliths, hand-axes from Meso-Neolithic times were discovered at Bellanbandi Palassa, which were manufactured from slabs extracted from the leg bones of elephants, and also daggers or celts made from sambar antler. From the same period, this and other sites have also yielded evidence of widespread use of ochre, domesticated dogs, differentiated use of space, inferred burials, and the strong use of fire.

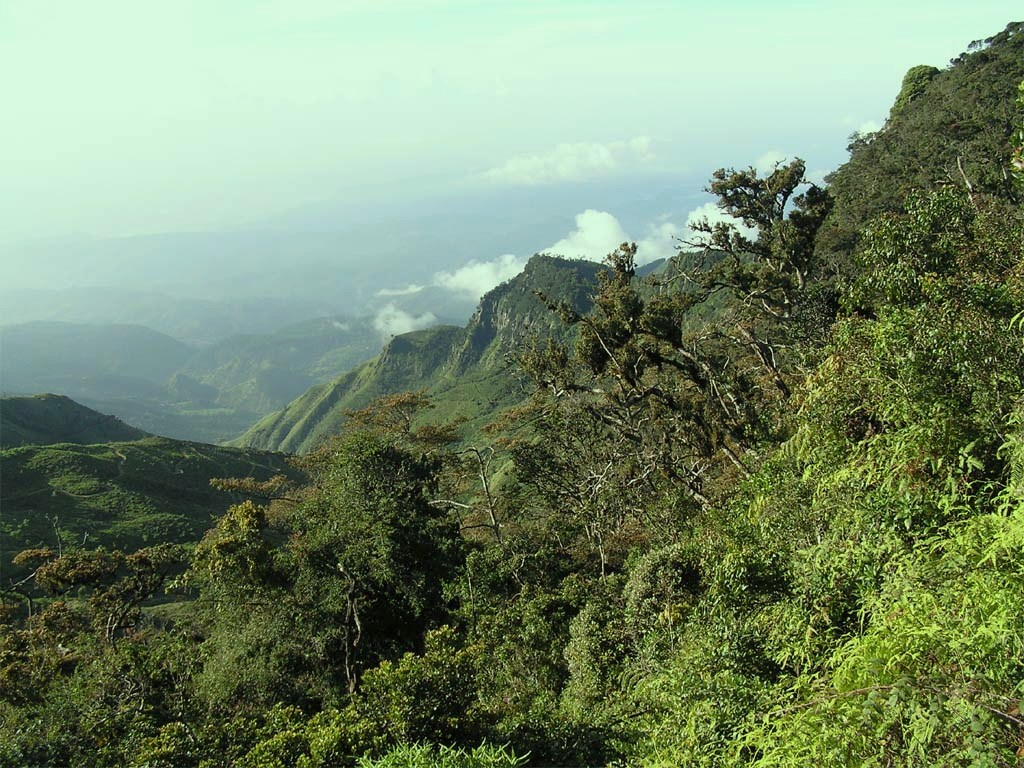
A precipice ("World's End") in the Horton Plains National Park

Other cultural discoveries of interest from the Meso-Neolithic period included articles of personal ornamentation and animals utilised as food, e.g. fish bones, seashell-based beads and shell pendants, shark vertebra beads, lagoon shells, molluscan remains, carbonised wild banana, breadfruit epicarps, and polished bone tools.

The frequency at which the marine shells, shark teeth and shark beads occurred at the different cave sites suggested that the cave dwellers likely had direct contact with the coast around 40 km away; Beli lena also showed signs that salt had been brought back from the coast.

The microlithic tradition appears to have been contemporaneous with high mobility, the use of rainforest resources and adaptation to changing climate and environment. The discovery of geometric microliths at Horton Plains, located on the southern plateau of the central highlands of Sri Lanka, suggests that the area was visited by prehistoric humans from the Mesolithic period. One possible interpretation is that in their annual cycle of foraging for food, prehistoric hunter-gatherers that lived in lowland rock-shelters periodically visited the Horton Plains for hunting—possibly wild cattle, sambur and deer—and gathering foods such as wild cereals. While it was likely used as a temporary camp-site, Horton Plains does not appear to have been used for more permanent settlement. From the late Pleistocene and Holocene periods there is evidence for the use of several lowland rainforest plant resources including wild breadfruit and banana, and canarium nuts.

The transition from hunter-foraging to food production with domesticated cereals and other plants seems to have begun in some tropical regions at the beginning of the Holocene. Until then, humans probably exploited the Horton Plains wetland, grassland and rainforest resources using slash-and-burn techniques, and facilitated the growth of rice fields.

== Link with indigenous people ==
It is surmised that the Balgonda man was Australoid with certain Neanderthal features, and physically closest to the aboriginal Veddas. Like the prehistoric people of the island, historical sources describe the Veddas as hunter-gatherers, who inhabited natural caves and traded their game and honey for metal-based arrow and spear points from neighbouring village populations. These villagers were predominantly descendants of populations from the Indian mainland who during different periods arrived from India. Over the years, while some Veddas remained in caves, others either assimilated with the neighbouring villagers or joined military campaigns led by the Kandyan kings during the Kingdom of Kandy from the late 15th century to the early 19th. While the Vedda title has also been adopted by certain present-day farming populations in Sri Lanka, it remains unclear whether they have any roots in the Vedda populations characterised by hunting and foraging. Metrical and morphometric features of the analysable skeletal remains from the Sri Lankan caves have revealed similar anatomical attributes, signalling the likelihood of a biological continuum from the prehistoric hunter-gatherers of the island to the Veddas, and a close biological affinity over a period of roughly 16,000 years. This is not surprising given the relative geographical isolation of the island until the fifth century BC when settlers arrived from the Indian mainland. Veddas are therefore relevant to the question of the degree of relative isolation of ancient and modern Homo sapiens in Sri Lanka from populations of southern India.

Veddas have relatively smaller statures, significantly more robust skulls, dental differences, including somewhat larger molar crown sizes, and greater cranial diversity than populations of southern India. While some of these features are also distinct from the Sinhalese and Tamil co-inhabitants of the island, and from Veddas with Portuguese, Dutch or British ancestry, some claim that certain other features including genetic traits do appear among present-day Sri Lankans, suggesting that their ancestry traces back to some of the earliest human settlers on the island.

A recent genetic study has found indigenous Vedda people to probably be the earliest inhabitants of Sri Lanka. The Vedda people's mitochondrial sequences were found to be more related to the Sinhalese and Sri Lankan Tamils than to the Indian Tamils. There has not been any ancient DNA study of Paleolithic or Mesolithic remains from Sri Lanka.

== List of prehistoric caves and locations ==
- Belilena – Kitulgala
- Wavula Pane – Ratnapura
- Batadombalena – Kuruwita
- Fa Hien Cave – Kalutara
- Bellanbandi Palassa – Pansadara Chena, Balangoda
- Horton Plains
- Dorawaka Lena – Kegalle
