= Fa Hien Cave =

Cave and archaeological site in Sri Lanka

- Pahiyangala Cave
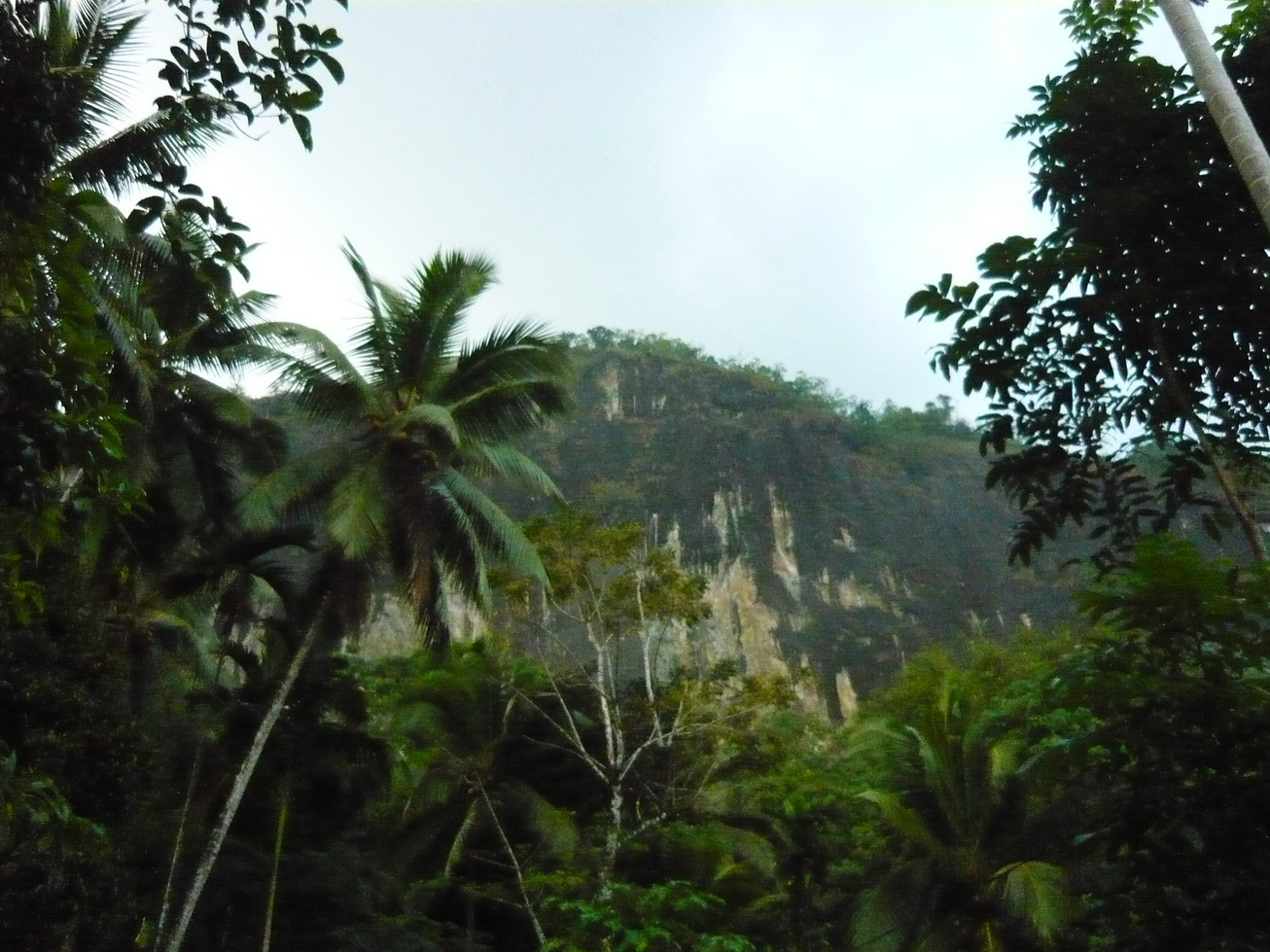
- remote view

- location in Sri Lanka
- 6°36′6″N 80°13′6″E
- Location: district of Kalutara
- Region: Sri Lanka

Site notes
- Archaeologists: Suren Deraniyagala

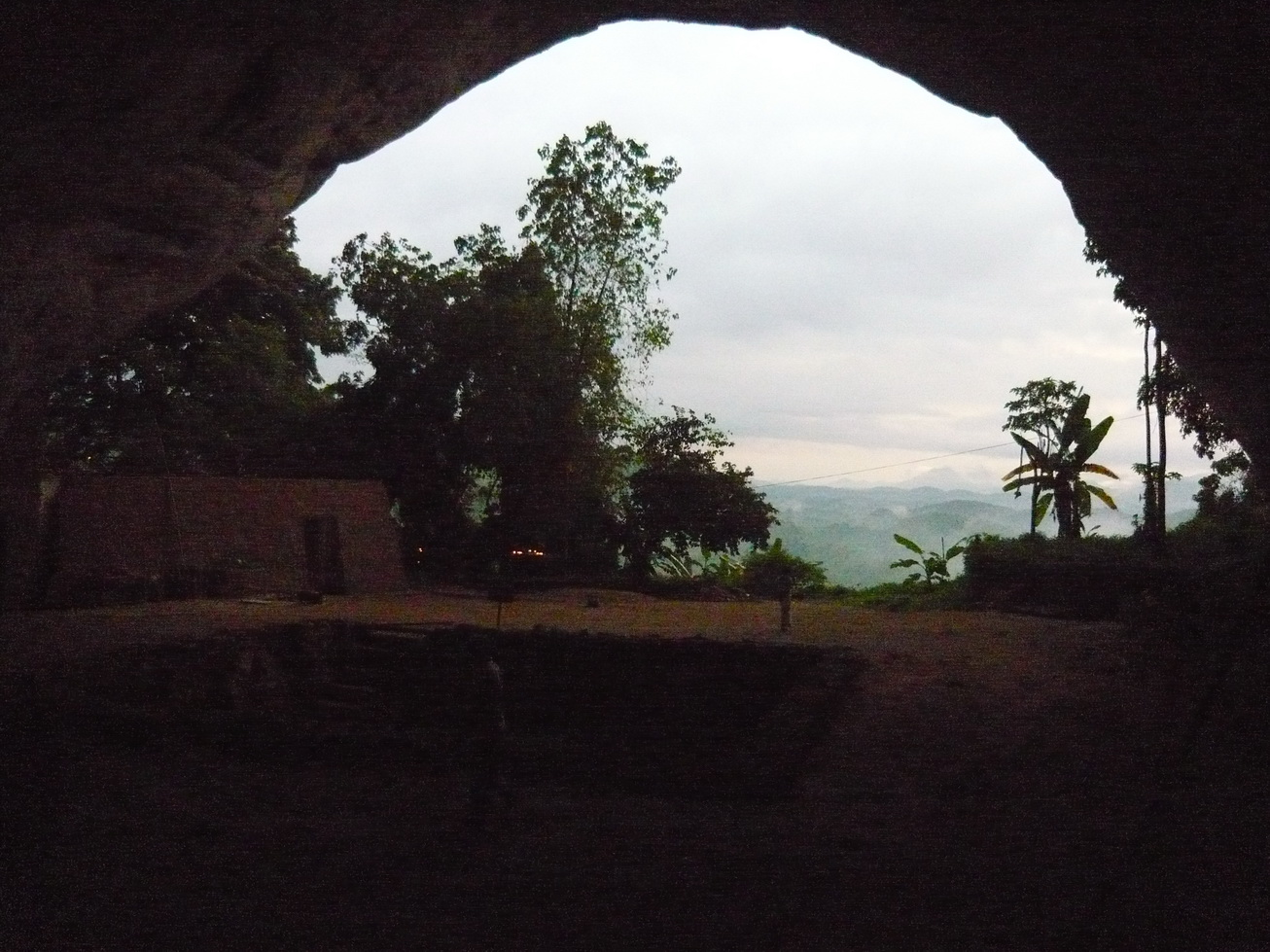
The cave entry

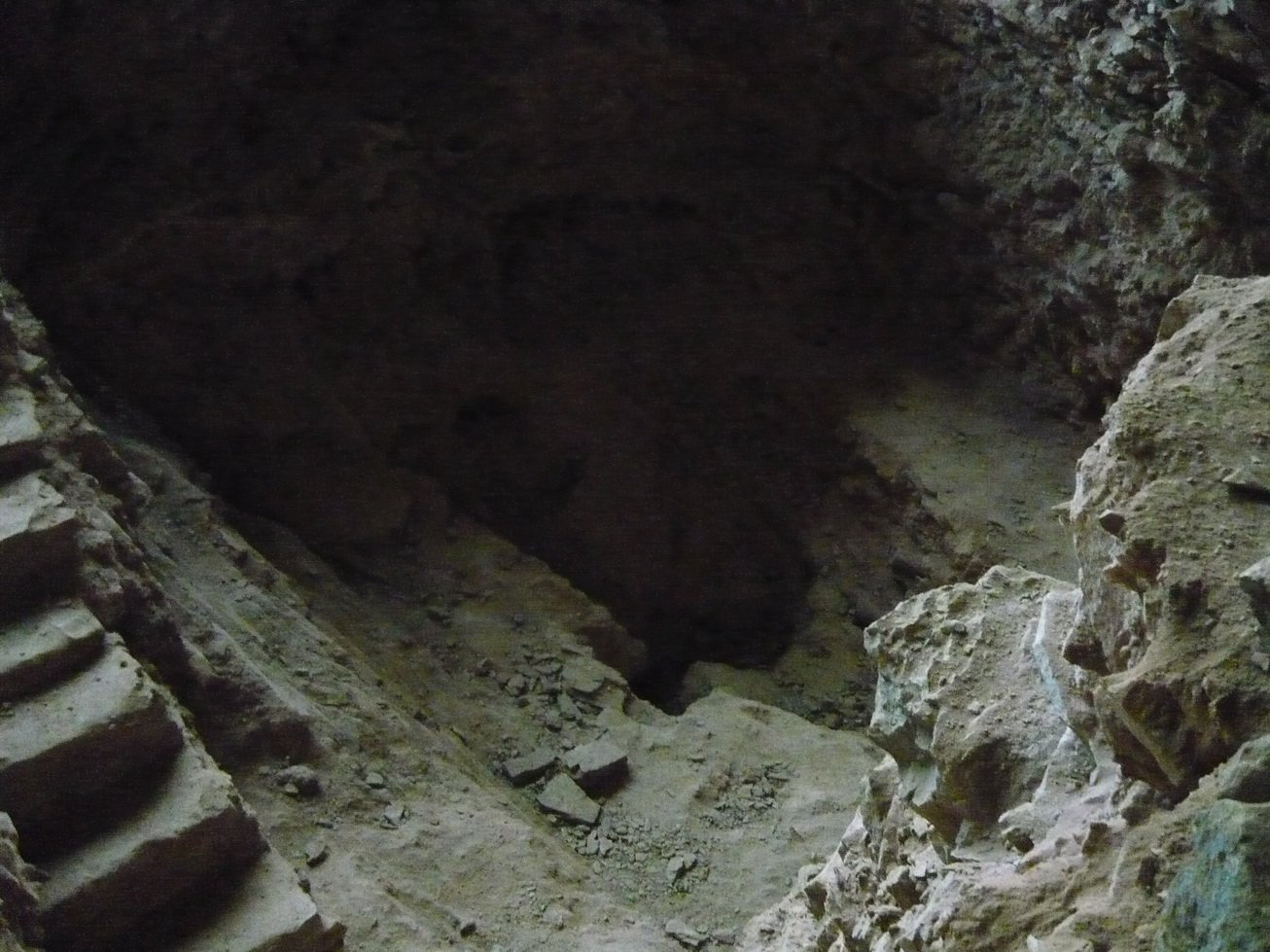
Pahiyangala archaeological site

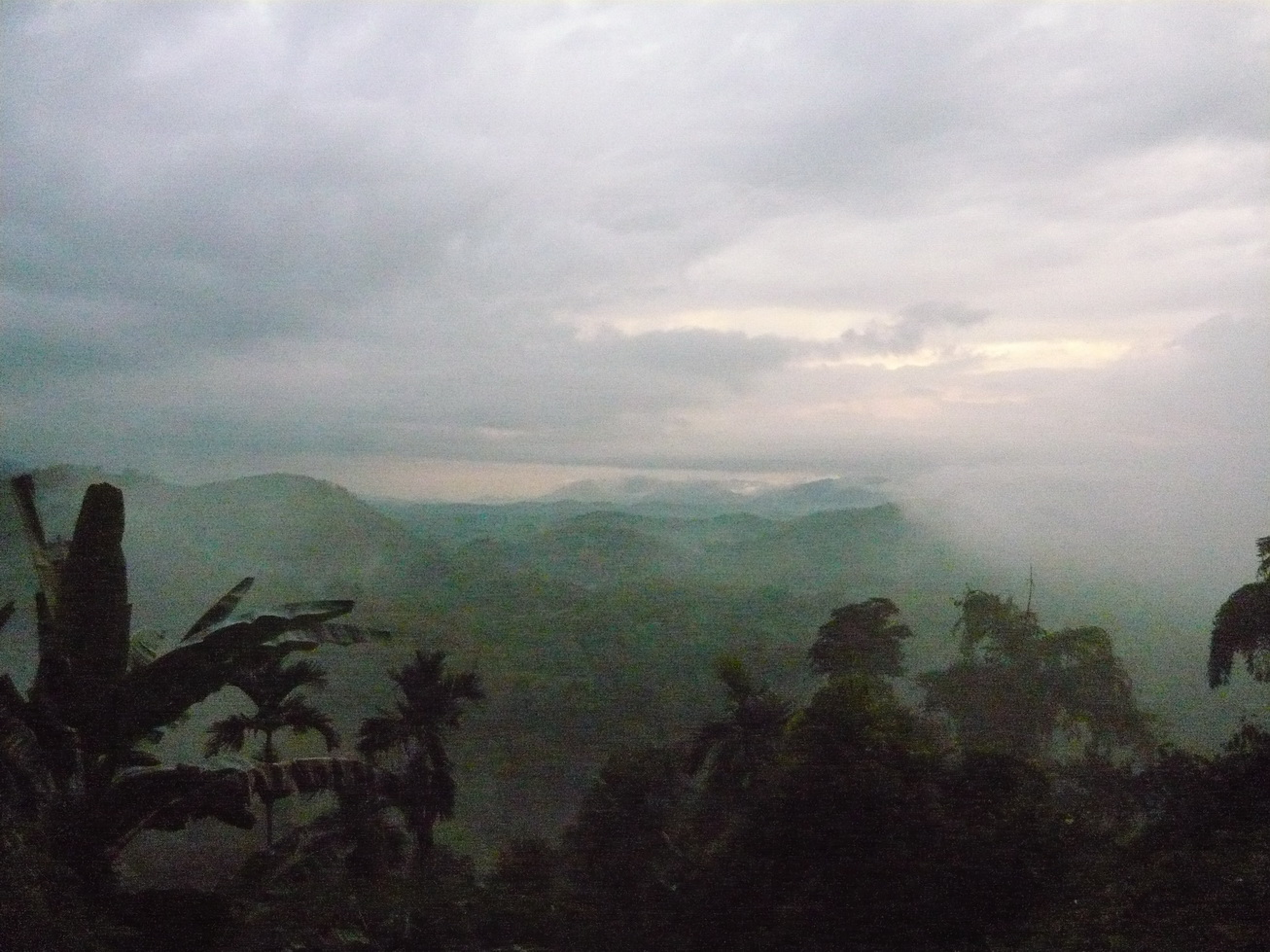
Aerial view

Fa Hien Cave, Faxian Cave, or Pahiyangala Cave is situated in the district of Kalutara, Western Province, Sri Lanka and according to a rural legend, named after an alleged resident during historical times, namely Buddhist monk Faxian, previously romanized as Fa Hien. However, there is no archaeological or historical evidence to support this legend. Nonetheless, the site is of archaeological significance as Late Pleistocene human fossilized skeletal remains were discovered in the cave's sediments during excavations in the 1960s, the 1980s and in 2013. This is the largest natural stone cave in South Asia. 3500 people can stay here at the same time. To see the size of the cave, you have to go inside and look outside. Prehistoric humans have lived here for 35000–60000 years. They used sea fish, salt, and shark teeth as ornaments. This limestone was formed by corrosion over hundreds of thousands of years.

== Prehistoric human remains ==
In 1968 human burial sites were uncovered inside the cave by Siran Upendra Deraniyagala of the Sri Lankan Government Department of Archaeology, who undertook a second excavation campaign with assistant W. H. Wijepala in 1988. The findings mainly consisted of microlith stone tools, remnants of prehistoric fireplaces and organic material, such as floral and human remains. Radiocarbon dating indicates that the cave had been occupied from about 33,000 years ago, the Late Pleistocene and Mesolithic to 4,750 years ago, the Neolithic in the Middle Holocene. Human remains of the several sediment deposits were analyzed at Cornell University and studied by Kenneth A. R. Kennedy and graduate student Joanne L. Zahorsky.

The oldest fragments of human bone fossils are attributed to three children, a juvenile and two adults that show evidence of secondary burials. The bodies had been exposed to decomposition and scavengers and the bones were subsequently placed in graves. Additional fossil remains include those of another young child, dated to about 6,850 years BP and of a young woman (nicknamed Kalu-Menika by archaeologists), dated to about 5,400 years BP. Both individuals were also recovered from secondary burials.

The discoveries allowed archaeological and paleontological comparative studies as the earliest occupants of Fa Hien, or Pahiyangala Cave lived during the same period as European Cro-Magnon man and other Late Pleistocene hominids in the Eastern Hemisphere. Studies of teeth found in the cave indicate that the prehistoric population of Sri Lanka processed food by grinding nuts, seeds and grains in stone querns and that they continued to maintain a hunter-gatherer lifestyle until about the 8th century BCE. Sri Lanka has yielded the earliest known microliths, which didn't appear in Europe until the Early Holocene.

In June 2020 research carried out by the Max Planck Institute, Griffith University in Australia, and the Sri Lankan Government Department of Archaeology, showed that occupants of the Fa-Hien Lena cave had developed bow and arrow technology 48,000 BP. This is the oldest use of this technology outside of Africa. The researchers found items associated with freshwater fishing, as well as the working of fiber to make nets or clothing. Lead author of the study, Michelle Langley of Griffith University, said, "We also found clear evidence for the production of colored beads from mineral ochre and the refined making of shell beads traded from the coast, at a similar age to other 'social signaling' materials found in Eurasia and Southeast Asia, roughly 45,000 years ago."

Other important Sri Lankan prehistoric sites at which human remains have been found include two other caves – Batadombalena (about 28,500 years old) near Kuruwita and Belilena near Kitulgala (about 12,000 years old) – and an open-air site, Bellanbandi Palassa in Rathnapura (about 6,000 years old).

== See also ==
- Balangoda Man
- Batatotalena Cave
- List of fossil sites

== Sources ==
- Kenneth A. R. Kennedy, "Fa Hien Cave", in Encyclopedia of Anthropology ed. H. James Birx (2006, SAGE Publications; ISBN 0-7619-3029-9)
- "Pre- and Protohistoric settlement in Sri Lanka" — S. U. Deraniyagala, Director-General of Archaeology, Sri Lanka
- Kenneth A. R. Kennedy and Siran U. Deraniyagala, Fossil remains of 28,000-year old hominids from Sri Lanka, Current Anthropology, Vol. 30, No. 3. (Jun., 1989), pp. 394–399.
- Kenneth A. R. Kennedy, T. Disotell, W. J. Roertgen, J. Chiment and J. Sherry, Biological anthropology of upper Pleistocene hominids from Sri Lanka: Batadomba Lena and Beli Lena caves, Ancient Ceylon 6: 165–265.
- Kenneth A. R. Kennedy, Siran U. Deraniyagala, W. J. Roertgen, J. Chiment and T. Disotell, Upper Pleistocene fossil hominids from Sri Lanka, American Journal of Physical Anthropology, 72: 441–461, 1987.
