= Batadombalena =

Archaeological site in Sri Lanka

- location in Sri Lanka
- 6°48′N 80°22′E
- Location: near Colombo
- Region: Sri Lanka

Batadombalena is an archaeological site with evidence of habitation from 8,000 years BCE, Balangoda Man, located 85 km (52.8 mi) from Colombo in Sri Lanka, a two-hour drive from Colombo.

The Batadombalena archaeological site contains evidence of habitation from as early as 8,000 years BCE and is one of the sites whose discoveries support the "Out of Africa" hypothesis, according to Professor Paul Mellars, a Cambridge University archaeologist. Among the evidence of Balangoda Man he unearthed at the site were stone tools that are interpreted as arrow - or spearheads and carefully shaped and perforated beads made from ostrich eggshell fragments. One particular piece of an ostrich eggshell, incised with a distinctive criss-cross motif, has also been discovered.

Batadombalena Cave has a size of roughly 50 ft × 60 ft × 80 ft (15 m × 18 m × 24 m).

== See also ==
- Batatotalena Cave
- Balangoda Man
- Fa Hien Cave
