= Belilena Cave =

Cave and archaeological site in Sri Lanka

- Beli Lena Cave
- Location within Sri Lanka
- Interactive map of Belilena Cave
- Location: near Kitulgala
- Coordinates: 7°0′8″N 80°26′8.8″E
- Height variation: 20 m (66 ft)
- Entrances: one
- Features: stalactites, stalagmites, skeletal fossils

Belilena Cave (Sinhala: කිතුල්ගල බෙලි ලෙන) is a cave in Sri Lanka, located 8 km (5.0 mi) from the town of Kitulgala. Evidence of prehistoric human presence as early as 32,000 years ago was recorded at the site. The skeletal remains of ten individuals were discovered by Paul E. P. Deraniyagala, who attributed them to Balangoda Man (Homo sapiens balangodensis). Balangoda Man is assumed to have lived as early as 32,000 years ago and occupied high altitude territories of up to 2,000 ft (609.6 m) above sea level.

== Overview ==
The part of the cave beyond the lake that fills it a short way from its mouth still remains unexplored. A visit to the site requires the use of a rope or rope ladder.

From 1978 to 1983 the site was scientifically excavated and researched by the Archaeological Department of Sri Lanka. Rich assemblages of cultural, faunal and human remains were discovered. The results of radiometric dating confirmed deposits of cultural material from 30,000 to 9,000 years before present. These materials include bone tools, evidence of the use of fire and geometric microlithic stone tools which, at 30,000 years old are of remarkable age. The site also yielded numerous remains of game animals, such as sambar deer, wild boar, Indian muntjac, several monkey species, porcupines, Indian giant squirrels and a large number of local reptiles and fish. Small mammals, aquatic and tree snails were prominent in the diet of Balangoda man, as were edible parts of plants such as wild breadfruit and the kekuna nut.

A trade network in salt with occupants of coastal lagoons some 80 km (49.7 mi) away had been established by 30,000 years ago. Rubble foundations that date to 16,000 years before present constitute the earliest evidence of substantial structures in South Asia.

The skeletal fossils of several humans were found in 16,000 year old sediments. These were intensively analysed by an international team of anthropologists and proved to be of great value for the understanding of the physical anthropology of Balangoda man.

Belilena cave is deemed important to the cultural heritage of Sri Lanka and future research with more advanced technologies and methods is expected to yield more knowledge. As such, the site has been declared an Archaeological Reserve of the Archaeological Department under the Antiquities Ordinance.

== See also ==
- List of caves in Sri Lanka
- Balangoda Man

== Bibliography ==
- Kenneth A. R. Kennedy, T. Disotell, W. J. Roertgen, J. Chiment and J. Sherry, Biological anthropology of upper Pleistocene hominids from Sri Lanka: Batadomba Lena and Beli Lena caves, Ancient Ceylon 6: 165–265.
- Kenneth A. R. Kennedy, Siran U. Deraniyagala, W. J. Roertgen, J. Chiment and T. Disotell, Upper Pleistocene fossil hominids from Sri Lanka, American Journal of Physical Anthropology, 72: 441–461, 1987.
- Annual Review of Anthropology: 1980 By Bernard J. Siegel - Page 403 & 416
- [1] Propaedia: outline of knowledge and guide to the Britannica.--[2]-[11] Micropaedia: ready reference and index.--[12]-[30] Macropaedia: knowledge in depth.
- Kenneth A. R. Kennedy, "Fa Hien Cave", in Encyclopedia of Anthropology ed. H. James Birx (2006, SAGE Publications; ISBN 0-7619-3029-9)
- Kenneth A. R. Kennedy and Siran U. Deraniyagala, Fossil remains of 28,000-year old hominids from Sri Lanka, Current Anthropology, Vol. 30, No. 3. (Jun., 1989), pp. 394–399.

== Films ==
- 2025 - Human (Episode 2: "Journeys")
