= Batatotalena Cave =

Cave system in Sudagala, Sri Lanka

Batatotalena (Batatota Cave)
- Diva Guhava
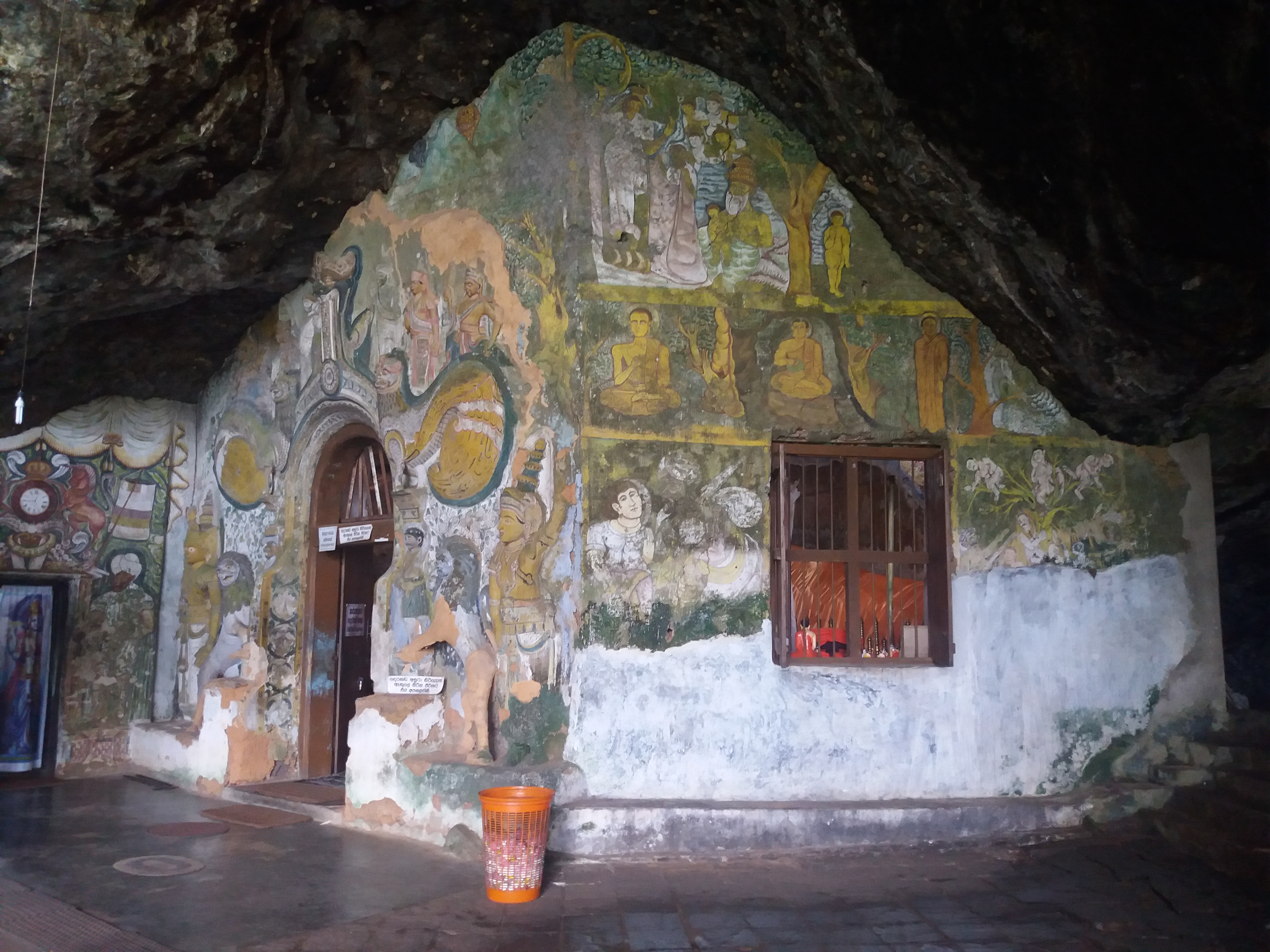
- The image house at the cave
- Interactive map of Batatotalena (Batatota Cave)
- Location: Sudagala, Sabaragamuwa Province, Sri Lanka
- Coordinates: 06°48′00″N 80°22′00″E
- Depth: 15 m (49 ft)
- Length: 25 m (82 ft)
- Discovery: 1995
- Access: Hike, climb

The Batatotalena (Batatota Cave), also known as the Diva Guhava (Day Cave) in Buddhist literature, is a cave system in Sudagala, 8 km (5 mi) away from the town of Kuruwita, in the Sabaragamuwa Province of Sri Lanka.

The cave measures approximately 15 m (49 ft) high, 18 m (59 ft) wide, and 25 m (82 ft) in length, totalling the internal cave area to 6,800 m^{3} (240,000 ft^{3}). Accessing the cave involves a 400 m (1,300 ft) hike from Sudagala, and an additional 50 m (160 ft) climb to reach the cave entrance. Approximately 30 m (98 ft) from the cave is another partially submerged cave, which is accessible after a 20 m (66 ft) swim.

In Buddhism, it is believed to be the cave in which the Buddha spent the day after placing his footprint on Adam's Peak, from where he supposedly proceeded to Dighavapi.

== See also ==
- Batadombalena
