= Bodhisattva statues of Sri Lanka =

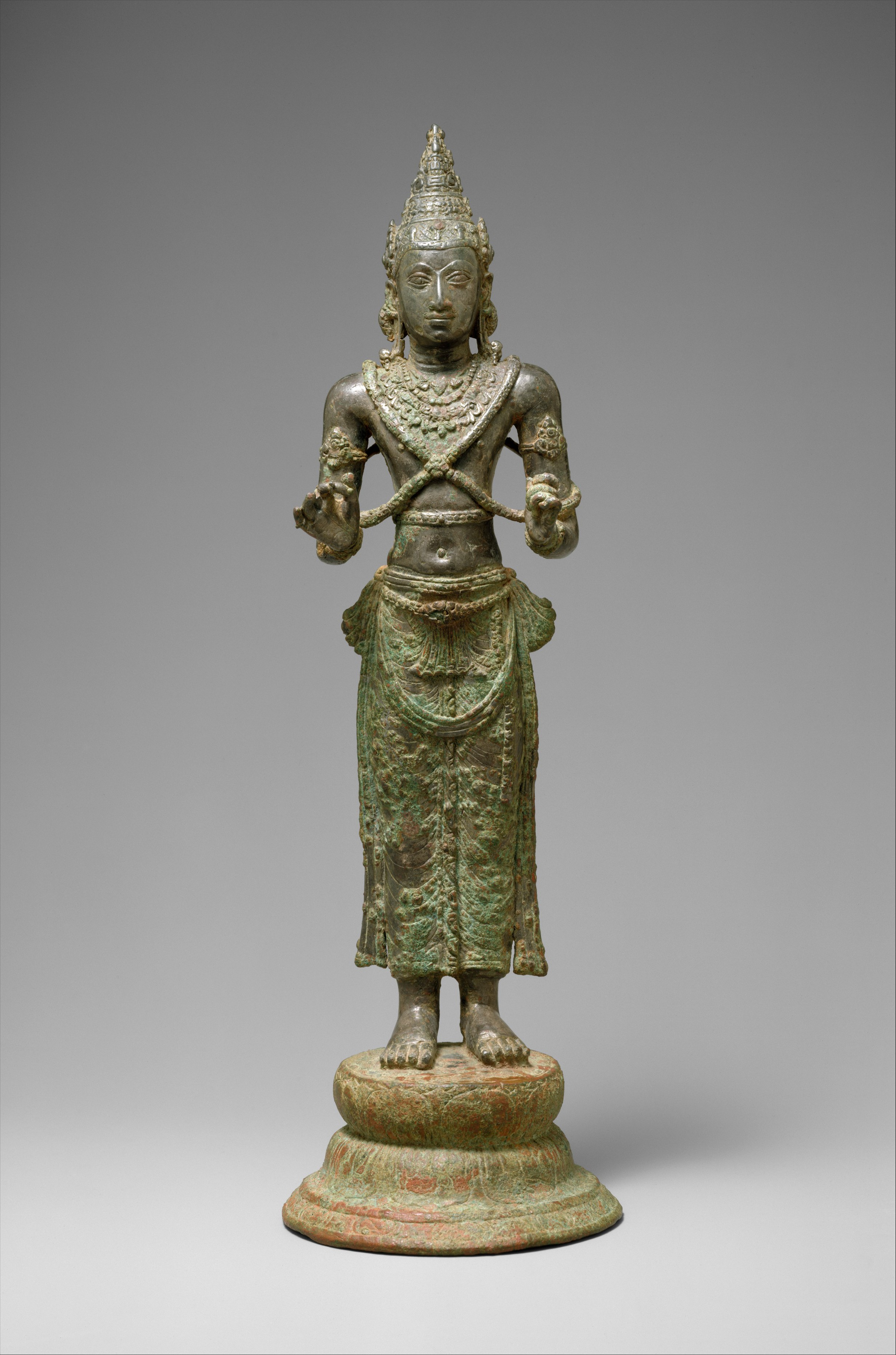
Bodhisattva statue, bronze, ca. 8th century; Metropolitan Museum of Art.

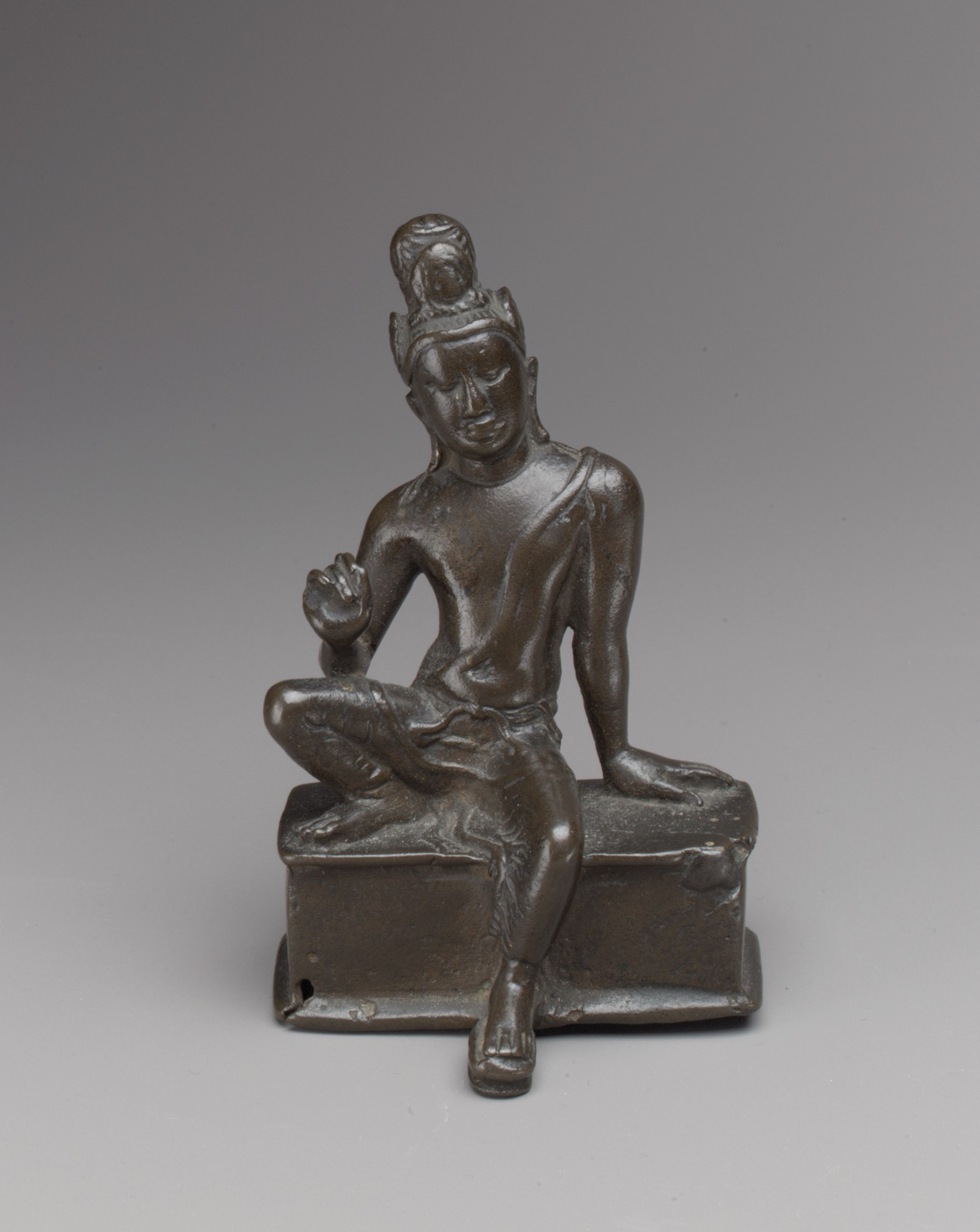
Seating Bodhisattva, later 7th–early 8th century; Metropolitan Museum of Art.

Although currently a Theravada Buddhism flourishing country, the Mahayana cult of worshipping Bodhisattva statues has existed in ancient Sri Lanka. Archaeological evidences show that Bodhisattva cult had existed as a secondary cult inferior to worship of Buddha during the Anuradhapura period. This can be assumed by the surviving Bodhisattva statues.

== History ==
During the middle Anuradhapura period, Bodhisattva cult became very popular in Sri Lanka. In the early period, Sri Lankan Buddhism was predominantly flourished with Theravāda Buddhist ideas. Later, Mahāyāna aspects were developed. In the Mahayana Buddhism, Bodhisattvas were worshipped with a major significance. During the Anuradhapura period it is mentioned that, King Mahāsēna had built Bodhisattva images. Also King Dhatusena (459–477 CE) had built a statue of Maitreya. Several inscriptions mentioning Avalokitesvara has found from the Anuradhapura period.

During 7th–10th centuries AD, Mahayana Buddhism had spread along the Sri Lankan territory. This is evidenced by many surviving Bodhisattva statues and carvings belonging to the period. It is mentioned that King Dappula I of Anuradhapura had built a 15 cubits-high Maitreya image in Ruhuna. This image is believed to be the recently restored Dambegoda Bodhisattva statue. This is an evidence for the strong Maitreya cult in ancient Sri Lanka.

King Bhuwanekabāhu IV of Gampola has built Maitreya and Nātha (Avalokitesvara) statues in Lankatilaka Vihara. It is mentioned that King Kirti Sri Rajasinghe had built a Maitreya image in Ridi Viharaya. Dambulu Viahara thudapatha, a text dated to1780 CE mentions about some Maitreya and Nātha images of the temple. These images can be seen flanking the standing Buddha near the central entrance of Dambulla cave temple.

== Types ==
Both male and female Bodhisattva images has found from Sri Lanka. Avalokitesvara images play a significant role among the statuary. Also various statues of Tārā, the wife of Avalokitesvara has found. It is assumed that cult of Tārā may have been popular in ancient Sri Lanka. Images of Maitreya are also common. Statues of Bodhisattvas Vajrapani and Manjushri has found in Sri Lanka.

Bronze, stone and ivory has used as the medium to create Bodhisattva images.

== Examples ==
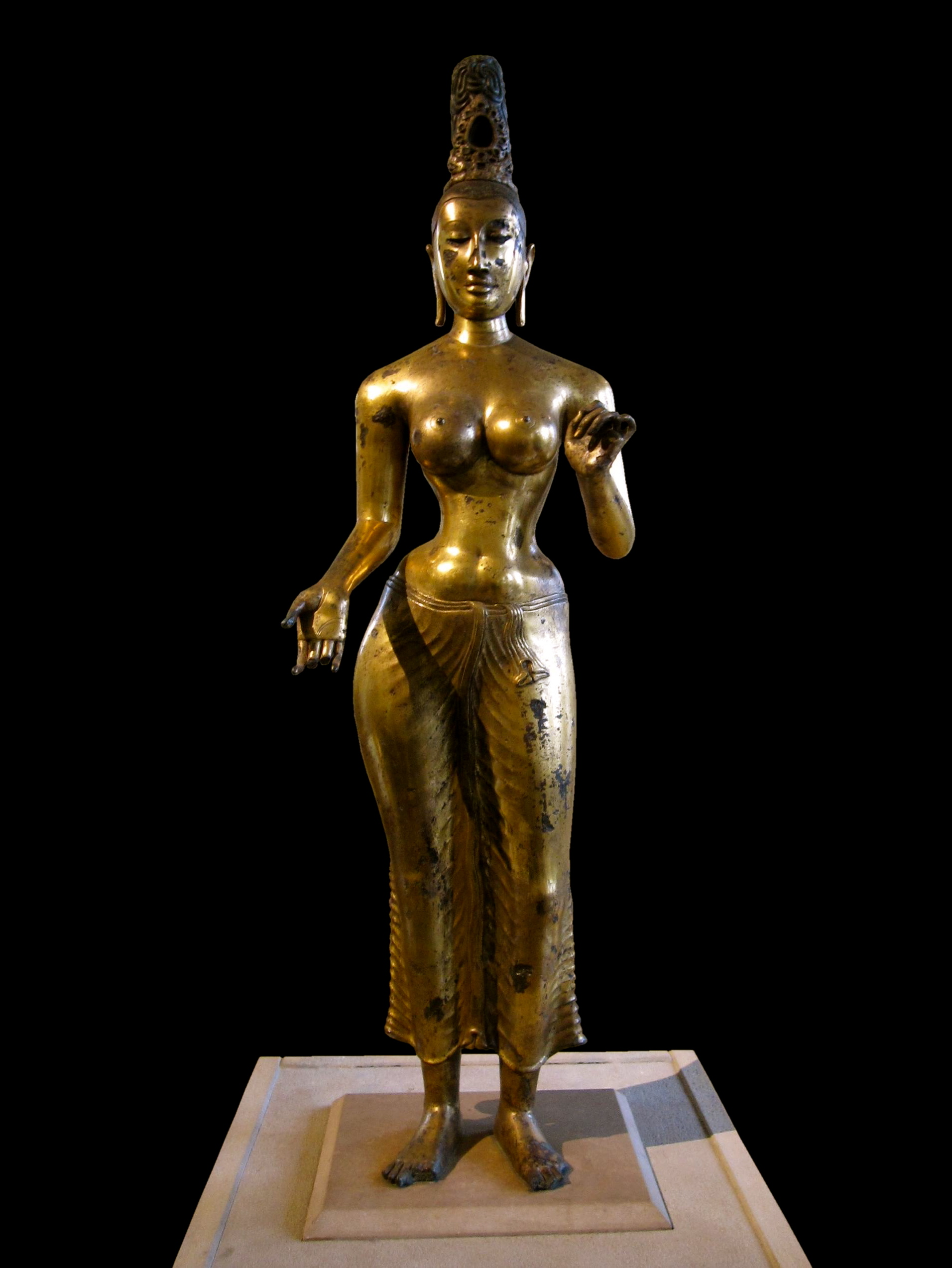
Statue of Tara; British Museum.

The Veheragala Avalokitesvara Bodhisattva, currently displayed at Colombo National Museum, is considered as the finest Bodhisattva image ever found in Sri Lanka. This bronze statue belonging to Anuradhapura period is delicately designed. Also the Statue of Tara, which is now housed in British Museum is considered as a masterpiece of Sri Lankan art. This image was originally found in Trincomalee district, Sri Lanka. The 33-foot (10 m) high Dambegoda Avalokitesvara Bodhisattva statue is also famous. Statues of Avalokitesvara, Maitreya, Manjushri and Tara can be seen at Buduruwagala. Kushtharajagala Bodhisattva statue of Weligama is another example for Sri Lankan Bodhisattva images. Another fine Tara image can be seen at Colombo National Museum. This statue of Seated Tara was found from Kurunegala district. It is dated to 8th–9th century AD.
