= House of Alakēśvara =

Sri Lankan feudal family

Alakēśvara අලකේශ්වර Alagakkōnāra
- Noble family
- Country: Kingdom of Gampola; Kingdom of Kotte
- Origin: Vrinchipura, India
- Founded: 12th century
- Founder: Nissanka Alagakkonara
- Current head: Extinct
- Final ruler: Parakramabahu Āpāna
- Seat: Jayawardenepura Kotte
- Historic seat: Rayigampura
- Titles: Patirāja (pre–1360); Prabhurāja (1360–1411)
- Connected members: Siri Sanga Bo; Senalahkadhikara
- Deposition: 1411

Alagakkōnāra (Sinhala: අලගක්කෝනාර, lit. 'Alagakkōnāra', Tamil: அழகக்கோன், lit. 'Aḻakakkōṉ, 'beautiful king' in Tamil'), also known as Alakēśvara, were a prominent feudal family that provided powerful ministers and military rulers to the Kingdom of Gampola and Kingdom of Kotte in Sri Lanka. Some historians claim that the family was of Tamil origin, possibly from Madurai or Kanchipuram in Tamil Nadu, India. The family arrived in Sri Lanka around the 13th century and naturalized themselves in Sri Lanka.

One member of the family is noted for founding the current capital of Sri Lanka, Sri Jayawardenepura Kotte as a fort from which he waged a war against encroaching tax collectors from the Jaffna kingdom in the north. The family lost most of its influence after its leader was taken captive by the Ming Dynasty (Chinese) Admiral Zheng He in 1411.

== Origin ==
Alagakkōnāra or Alakēśvara should not be regarded as a personal name as it is applied to multiple members of the same family across 10 generations. Alagakkōnāra appears to be of Tamil origin. According to Somaratna, Alaka (Skt.) meaning "the abode of Kuvera", while Konar meant "chief". In Sinahlese writings the name appears in its sanskrit form as Alakēśvara.. However, the word aḻaku commonly means 'beautiful' in Tamil (e.g. aḻakaṉ - handsome man).

There is little evidence of the origin of the family and where they got their political power from. The first member of the family to arrive in Sri Lanka was named Nissanka Alagakkonara, who migrated to Sri Lanka from a place called Vrinchipura or Kanchipuram. His origin may go back to the reign of Parakramabahu I (1153-1186). Contemporary sources reveal that the Alakēśvaras, although they initially concentrated on mercantile activities and became wealthy, eventually accrued political power with the Kingdom of Gampola by the 14th century by securing a position as court officials. This was helped by their conversion to Buddhism following their arrival in the island.

== History ==
=== Rise to political dominance ===
During the 1350s due to periodic invasions of the western region of Sri Lanka by the northern based Jaffna kingdom, many regions had begun to pay tribute and taxes to the Aryacakravarti kings. The third member of the family to figure in historical accounts, known only as Nissanka Alakēśvara, was a minister of Vikramabahu III fortified a marshy region around present day Colombo region, on the marshes to the south of the Kelani River. He called the fortress Jayewardhanapura, and the area became known as Kotte, "The fort". By 1369 Alakesvara drove out the tax collectors and attacked the encampments of soldiers from Jaffna kingdom who attempted to invade the Sinhalese kingdoms at Chilaw and Negombo killing a large number of them and forcing the rest to retreat. The Aryacakravarti launched a second invasion attempt during the reign of Bhuvanaikabahu V, landing in the southern kingdom by land and sea. Although the king initially fled his capital, his army defeated the force that approached along the ground in Matale. Alakēśvara simultaneously attacked the troops that arrived by sea, routing them at Dematagoda, and destroying their ships at Panadura.

Although most Sinhalese sources mention that he was able to defeat the invaders, there is a conflicting epigraph by the Kings of Jaffna known as the Kotagama inscription detailing how the King of Jaffna had prevailed.

Subsequently, local sources are clear that he began to be viewed as a credible leader and overshadowed the actual king and came to be considered as the real power.

=== End of the family's power ===
After Alakeswara's death, established as between 1382 and 1392, there was disunity in his family with family members fighting each other for power and procession. Kumara Alakesvara, half-brother of Bhuvanaikabahu V controlled the region from 1386 to 1387 and was followed by Vira Alakesvara from 1387 onwards until 1391, when he was ousted by the rival claimants relative. He came back to power with the help of foreign mercenaries in 1399. He ruled until 1411 when he confronted the visiting Chinese Admiral Zheng He resulting in a war. Zheng captured and took him to China, returning him to the country a year later. However the humiliation suffered due to this incident, and the decades of infighting within the family, greatly diminished its political power.

== List of title holders ==
=== Prabhurāja (1360) ===
The title of Prabhurāja seems to be and honorary title conferred upon Nissanka Alagakkonara by Vikramabahu III in appreciation of this victory against the Aryacakravartis in the 1360 Jaffna invasion of Gampola.

- Nissanka Alagakkonara (d. 1386/7) - (c. 1360–1386/7) (1st Alagakkōnāra to hold title of Prabhurāja)
- Kumara Alakesvara (d. 1391/2) - (c. 1386/7–1391/2) (son of Nissanka)
- Vīra Alakēśvara - (c. 1391/2) (younger brother of Nissanka, uncle of Kumara)
- Vīrabahu Āpāna (d. 1399/1400) - (c. 1391/2–1399/1400) (youngest brother of Nissanka) (Note: brother-in-law and Yuvaraja (heir apparent) of the reigning monarch, Bhuvanekabahu V)
- Vijaya Āpāna and Tunayesa (d. 1400) - (c. 1399/1400) (sons of Vīrabahu)
- Vīra Alakēśvara - (c. 1400–April/May 1411) (younger brother of Nissanka, uncle of Kumara)
- Parakramabahu Āpāna (d. June 1414) - (c. June 1414) (grandson of Senalankadhikara)

== Bibliography ==
Books

- de Silva, K. M. (2005). A History of Sri Lanka. Colombo: Vijitha Yapa. p. 782. ISBN 955-8095-92-3.
- Rasanayagam, Mudaliyar (1926). Ancient Jaffna, being a research into the History of Jaffna from very early times to the Portuguese Period. Everymans Publishers Ltd, Madras (Reprint by New Delhi, AES in 2003). p. 390. ISBN 81-206-0210-2.

Journals

- Somaratna, Gintota Parana Vidanage (1969). "Political history of the Kingdom of Kotte (c. A.D. 1400-1521)". PhD thesis, SOAS University of London.
