= Vira Alakesvara =

Sri Lankan king of Gampola from 1397 to 1411

Vijayabahu VI
- King of Gampola
- Reign: 1397 to 1411
- Predecessor: Vira Bahu II
- Successor: Parakramabahu Epa
- House: Alagakkonara

Vira Alakesvara, also known as Vijayabahu VI, was the last King of Gampola who ruled from 1397 to 1411. He was the last prominent member of the Alagakkonara family.

== Biography ==
His father was a minister of the local king Vikramabahu III of Gampola fortified a marshy region around present day Colombo region, on the marshes to the south of the Kelani River. His death is established as between 1382 and 1392.

At his father's death, there was disunity in his family with family members fighting each other for power and procession. Kumara Alakesvara, half-brother of king Buwanekabahu V controlled the region from 1386–87 and was followed by Vira Alakesvara from 1387 onwards until 1391, when he was ousted by the rival claimants relative. He came back to power with the help of foreign mercenaries in 1399. He ruled until 1411 when he confronted the visiting Chinese Admiral Zheng He resulting in the Ming-Kotte War. Zheng captured and took him to China, returning him to the country a year later.
