= Tang dynasty tomb figures of Liu Tingxun =

Chinese Tang dynasty tomb figures
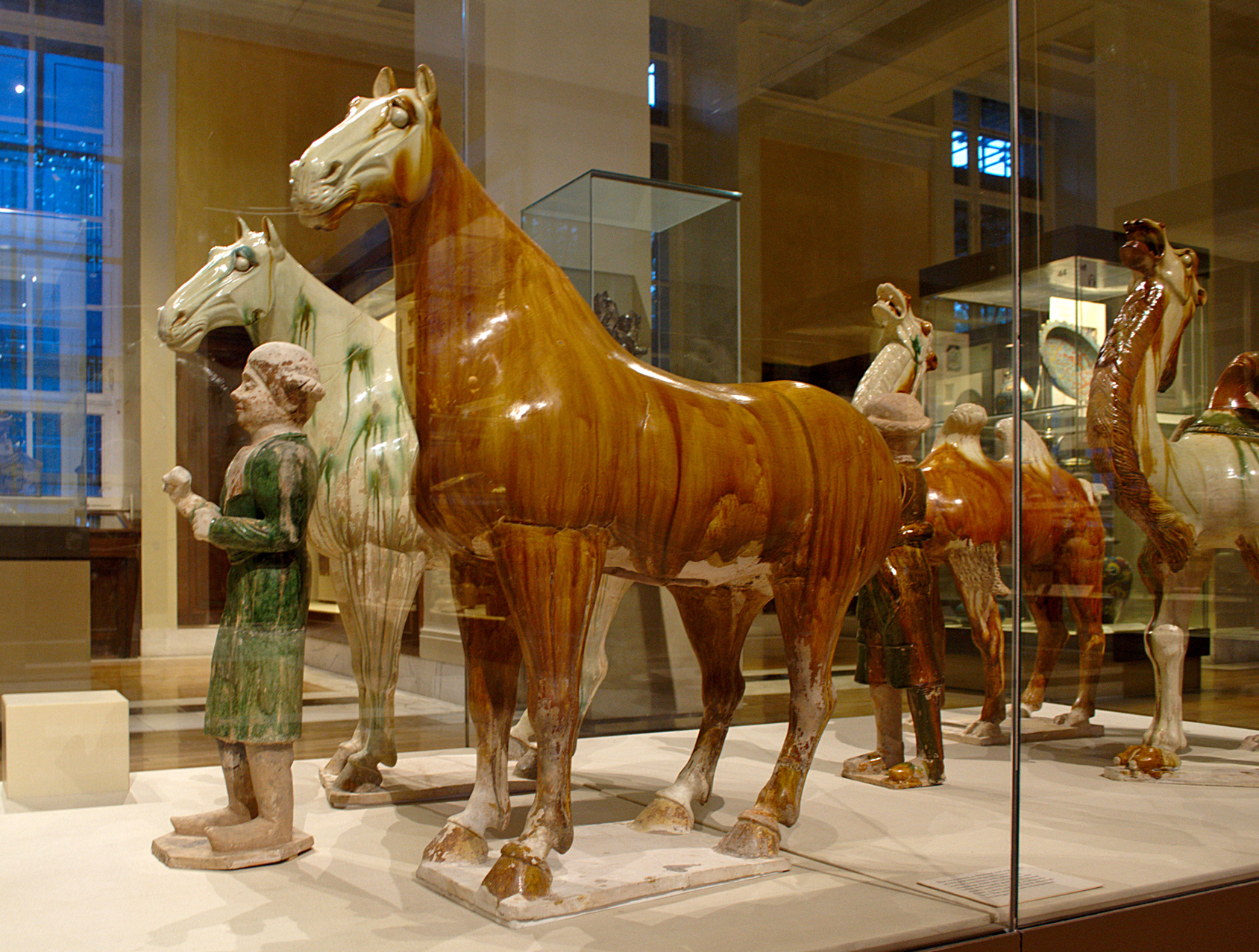
- Horses and grooms from the tomb of Liu Tingxun on display in the British Museum
- Material: Glazed ceramic
- Size: c. 100 cm high
- Created: Tang dynasty
- Discovered: Luoyang
- Present location: British Museum, London

The Tang dynasty tomb figures of Liu Tingxun (劉庭訓) are thirteen earthenware tomb figures found in a tomb believed to be that of Liu Tingxun, a Chinese general who died in 728 AD. These figures were found in Luoyang and are now on display in the British Museum in London. Similar Tang dynasty tomb figures of people and animals from other tombs of the same era can be found in other museums around the world.

== Description ==
The thirteen figures consist of five pairs and a set of three. All of the figures were decorated using the sancai ("three colours") technique developed during the Tang dynasty. The colours used in the glazes were a recent innovation at the time. These colours were produced by adding layers of metallic element oxides and firing them at 750 to 800 degrees celsius. Copper oxide was used to produce a green colour and iron oxide was used to produce orange or brown. Other elements create more exotic colours. The first Sancai ceramics from the Tang dynasty were recovered in the early twentieth century.

The leading pair are semi-human, winged and cloven and are designed to scare off any intruders into the tomb. One of these has a human face. Behind the leading pair are two Lokapala. These were Buddhist tomb guardians. Behind this pair are two officials or civil servants. One is thought to be military and the other a civilian. At the rear are two horses and two camels. These larger statues would have been created in parts and then assembled using slip to join the parts. The camels were used as beasts of burden to carry goods around China and for import and export along the silk route. Horses were also useful but they imported exotic breeds into China. These horses were used to play Polo. The animals are themselves looked after by three ceramic grooms.

== History ==
Liu Tingxun was a general and Imperial privy councillor who lived in the middle of the Tang dynasty. Liu was a general of the Zhongwu army as well as a lieutenant of the Henan and Huinan districts. Liu was born in approximately 656 AD and died aged 72 in 728.

General Liu Tingxun's position and wealth is demonstrated not just from the ceramic figures but also from the obituary text that was reputedly found within the tomb. The association of Liu Tingxun and this funerary text with the figures is based on an article written R.L. Hobson in the Burlington Magazine in 1921. The article quotes from the text which was translated into English from a rubbing of the text. The whereabouts of this rubbing is unknown at present. Liu's epitaph is written in a first-person point of view, as if by the general himself. It records that he was 72 years old when he died and boasts of his skill as both a soldier and a politician.

The figures unearthed in Liu's tomb are representative of a type which has been found in great numbers in urban areas of northwest China. These statues are a symbol of the high status of the person buried within these tombs. This style of ceramic tomb figure is thought to have been fashionable for about fifty years from around 700 AD. The figures were bought by the British Museum from the orientalist George Eumorfopoulos in 1935-6. The price was below the market rate and was reported as a "princely gesture" where Eumorfopoulos sold and donated a vast collection to both the British Museum and the Victoria and Albert Museum.

== Gallery ==
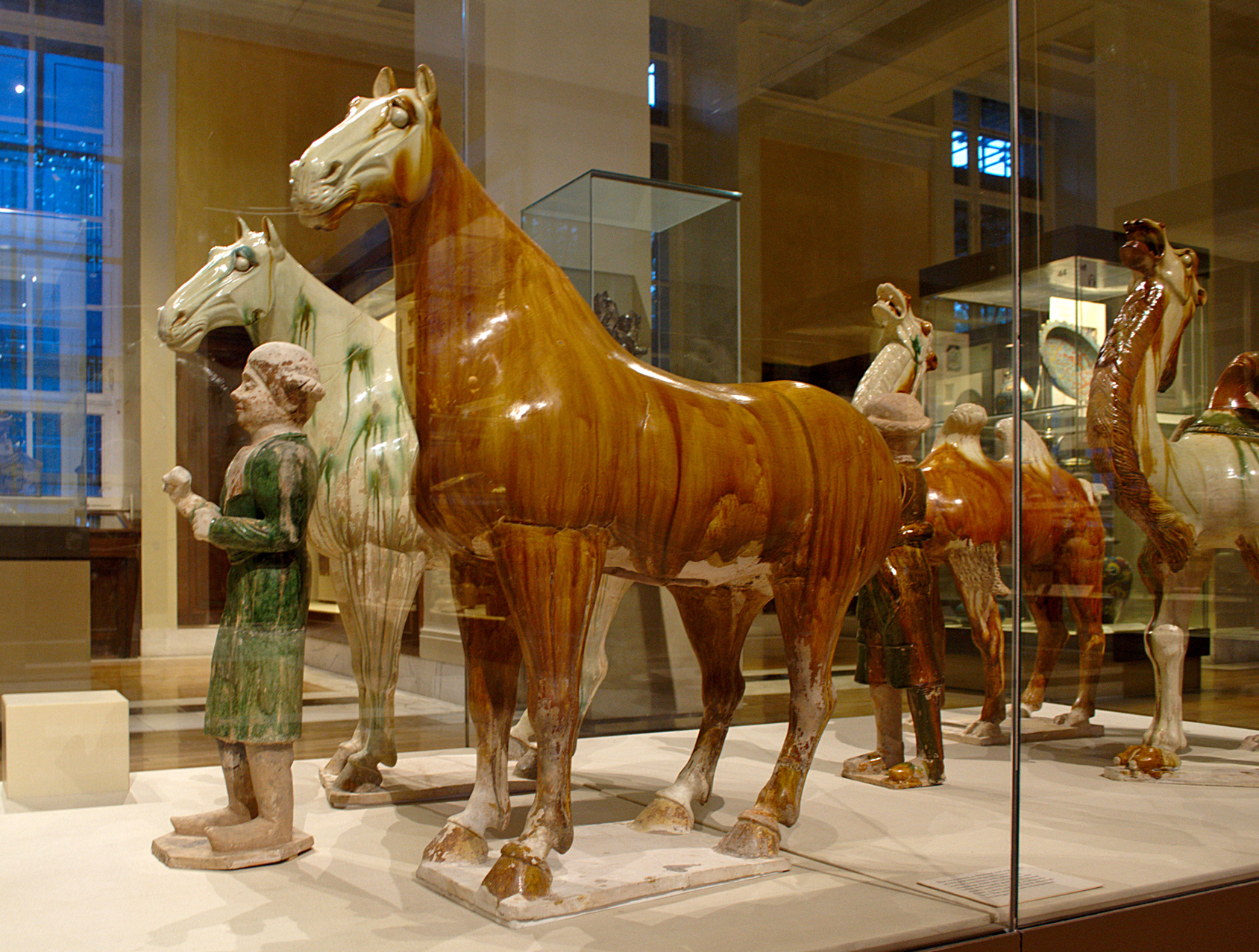
Horses and grooms from the tomb ensemble

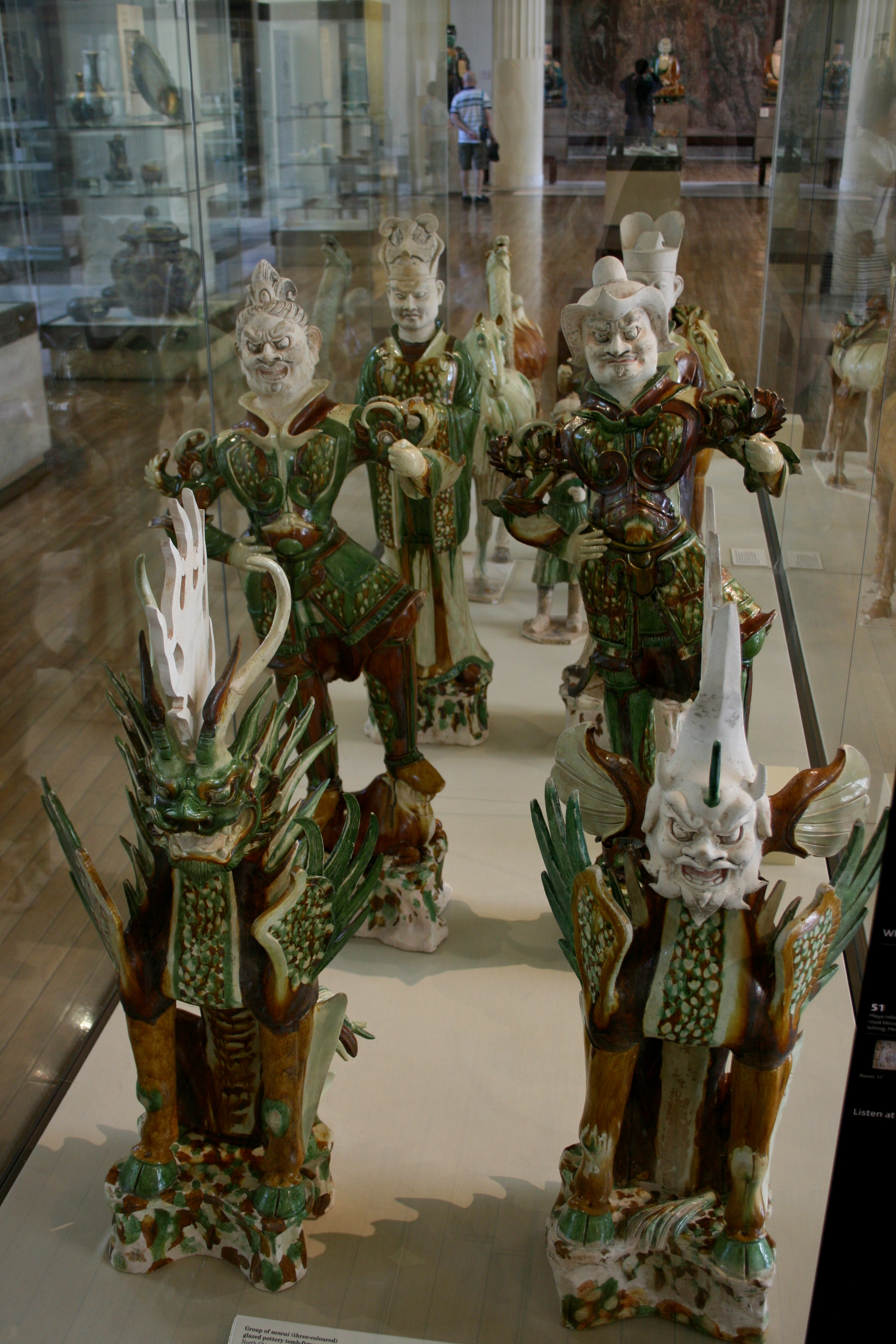
All 13 tomb figures as displayed in the British Museum

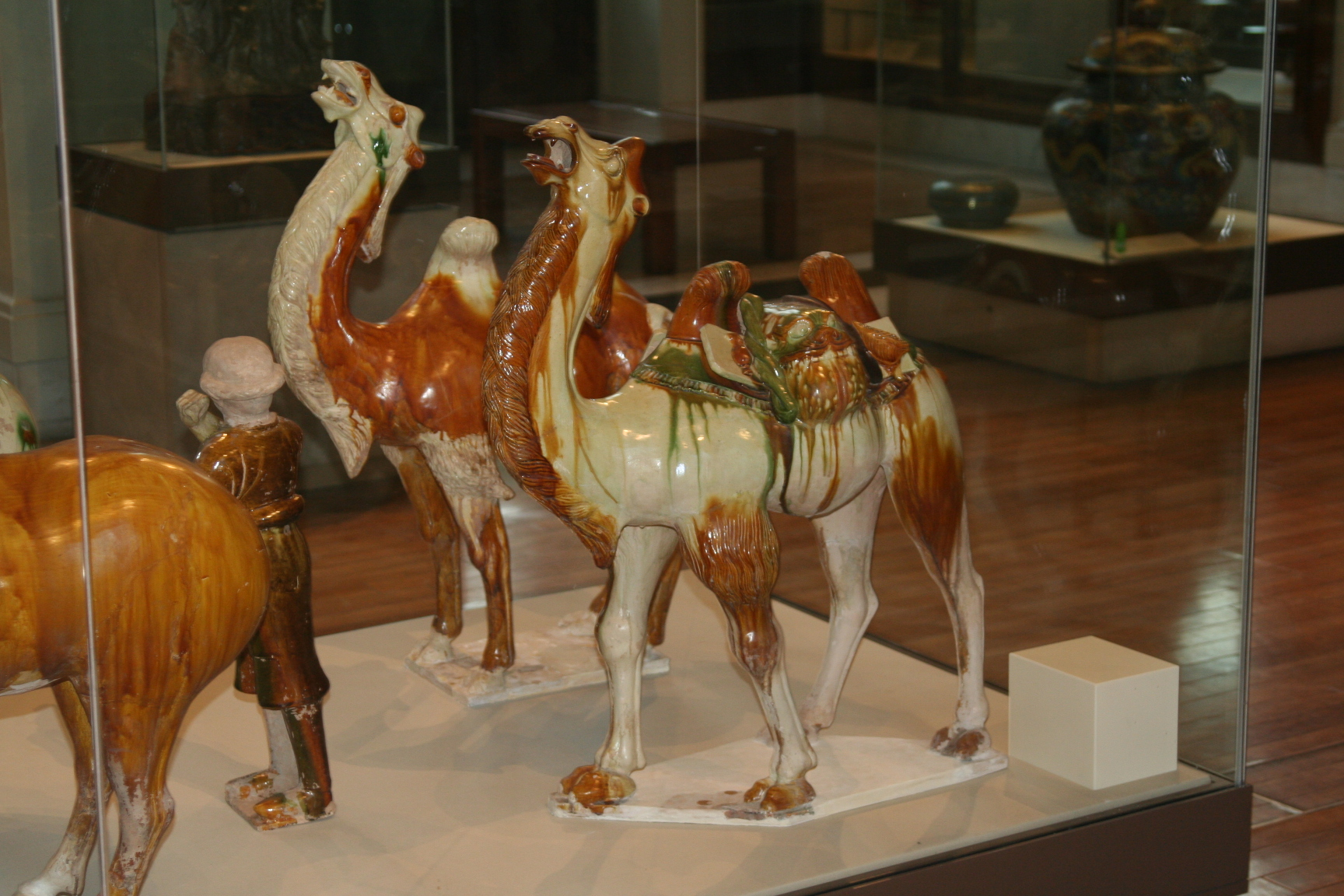
Camels made of brown and green glazed earthenware.

Figures of buddhist guardians standing on bulls

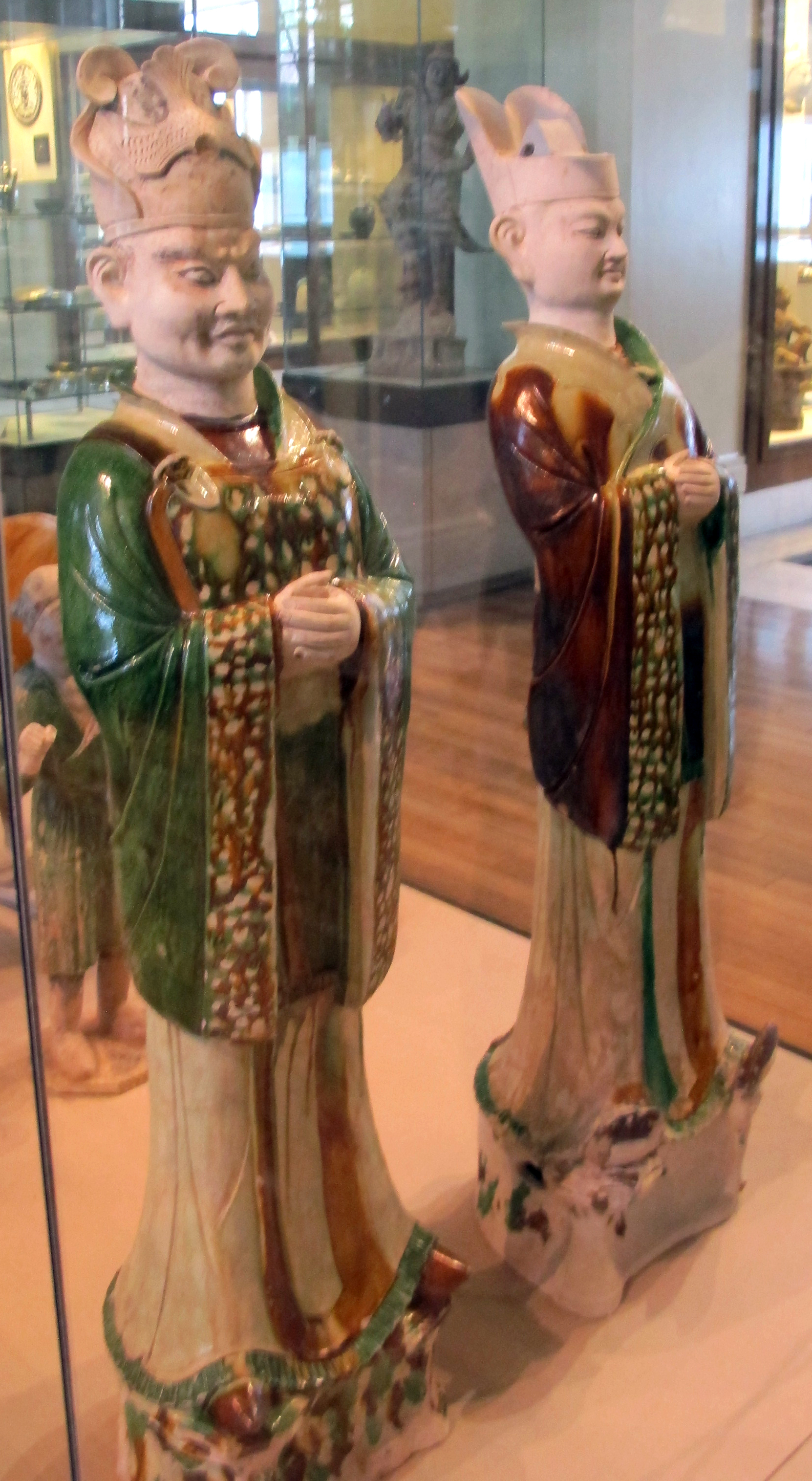
Ceramic figures of mandarins or civil servants

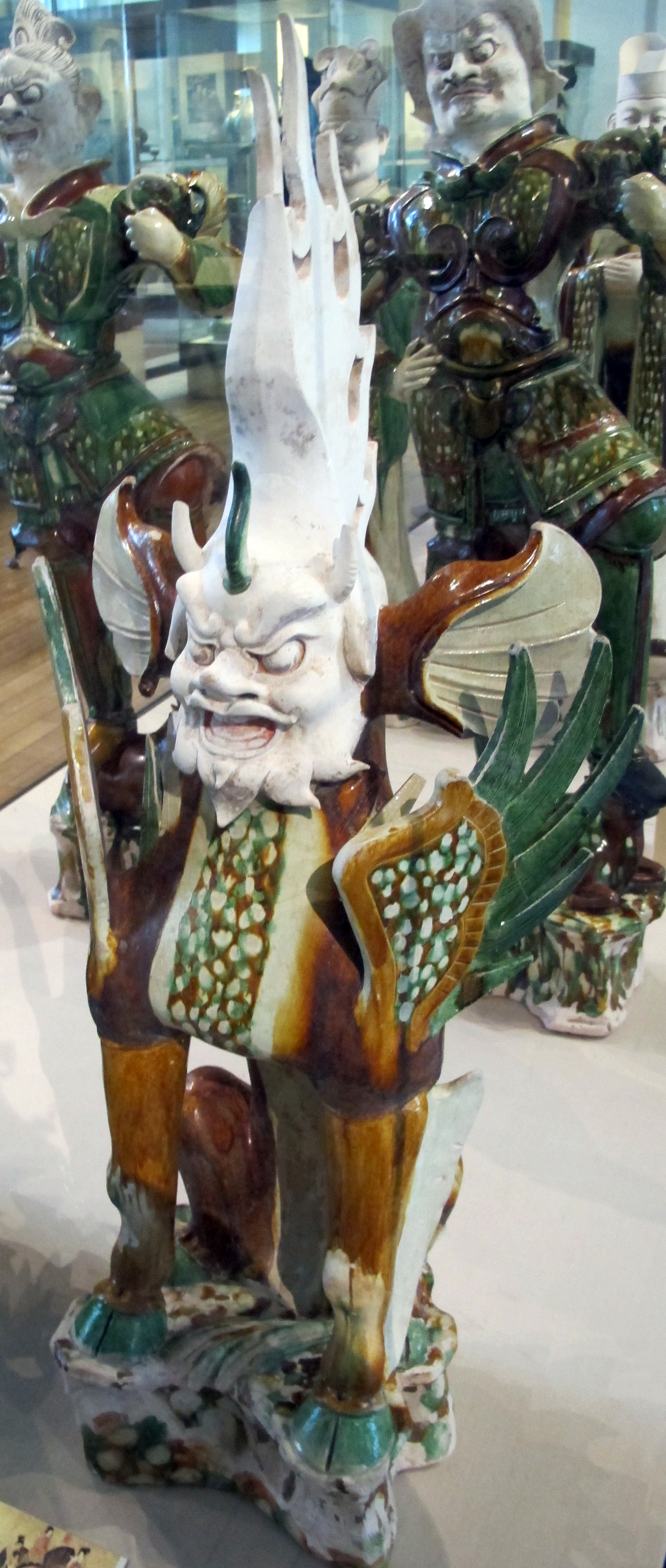
An earth spirit made of green and brown glazed earthenware.

Preceded by 54: Statue of Tara	A History of the World in 100 Objects; Object 55	Succeeded by 56: Vale of York Hoard
