= Kande Vihara =

Buddhist temple in Sri Lanka

- කන්දේ විහාරය
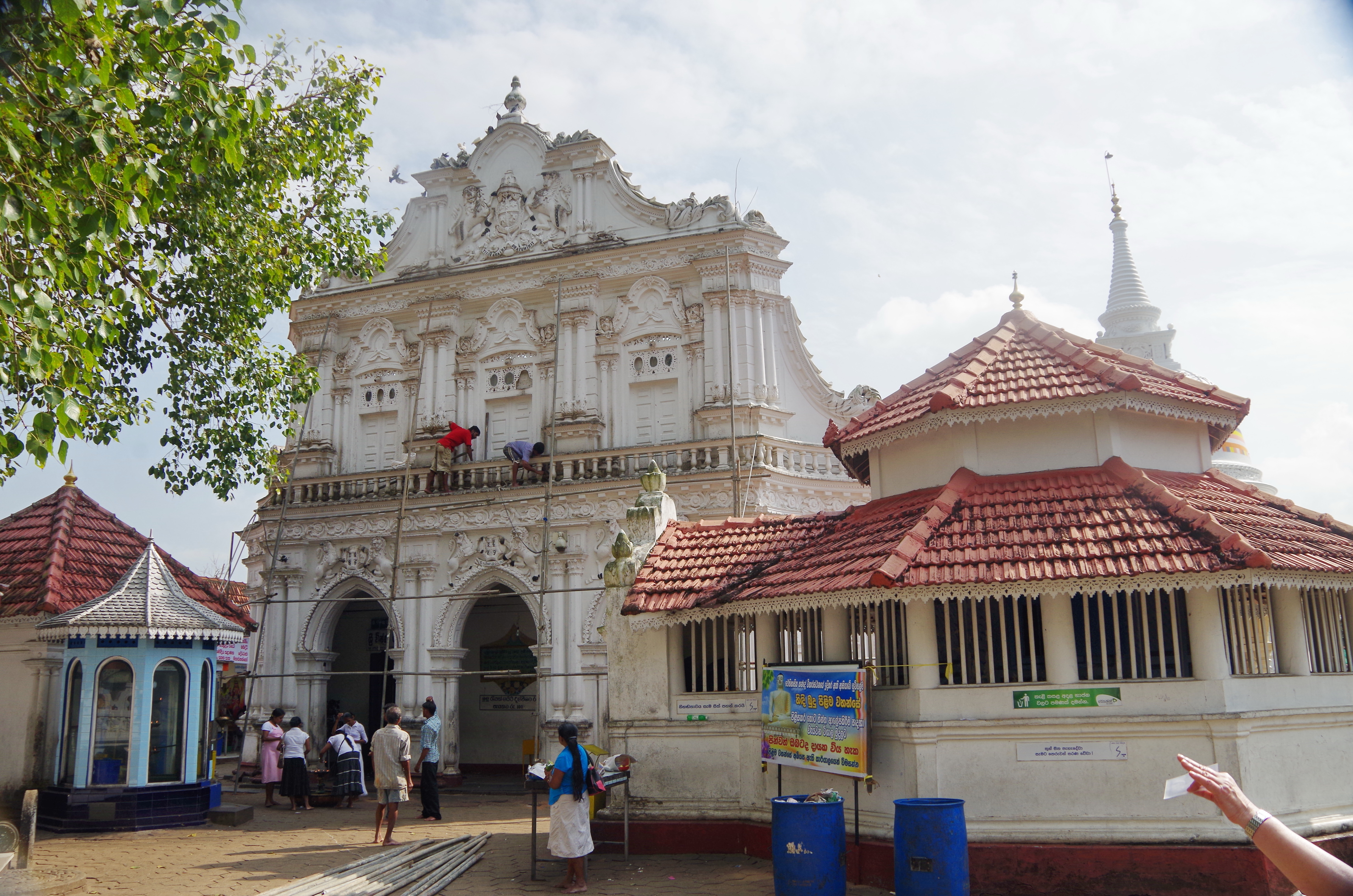

Religion
- Affiliation: Buddhism
- District: Kalutara District
- Province: Western Province

Location
- Location: Kaluwamodara, Aluthgama
- Interactive map of Kande Vihara
- Coordinates: 06°26′56.8″N 80°00′01.0″E

Architecture
- Type: Buddhist Temple
- Founder: Karapagala Dewamitta Thero
- Completed: 1734

Kande Vihara (Sinhalaː කන්දේ විහාරය) is a major Buddhist temple in Kalutara District, Sri Lanka. The temple has got its name 'Kande vihara' (Mountain temple) as it is built on top of a hill located near to Aluthgama town. The temple has been formally recognised by the Government as an archaeological site in Sri Lanka.

== History ==
The temple was founded by Karapagala Dewamitta Thero in 1734, under the guidance of Udugama Chandrasara thero who was then chief incumbent of Galapatha Raja Maha Vihara and a pupil of Weliwita Sri Saranankara Thero. Since then the temple was renovated and developed time to time under state patronage that lead the temple to become a major Buddhist shrine in the country. In 1904 the Kshethrarama Pirivena, an educational institution for monks, was attached to the temple as a result of the efforts done by Hikkaduwe Sri Sumangala Thero. The pirivena acts as a center for Buddhist education in the country, is also conducted by the Kande Vihara.

The image house, Stupa and the sacred Bodhi tree with its enclosing octagonal shaped wall are considered as very old monuments in the temple. The Bodhi tree is believed to be more than 300 years old. The large Stupa of the temple which was erected in 1935, has been constructed as enclosing a small sized Stupa, constructed by Udugama Chandrasara Thero in 1783.

In 2002, a foundation stone for a gigantic Samadhi Buddha statue depicting the Bhoomisparsha Mudra was laid in the temple premises and the completed statue was open to the public in 2007, making the temple more popular among the local devotees. The statue is 48.8 m (160 ft) in height and considered as one of tallest sitting Buddha statues in the world.

== The temple ==
The temple comprises the Stupa, Bodhi Tree, Relic Chamber, Image House, Upulvan Devalaya and the other main Devalas including Kataragama and Pattini Devalaya. Bodhi Tree, preaching hall and the Seema Malaka are situated outside the Vihara premises. The Stupa has been built in bell shape and erected within an octagonal Shelter.

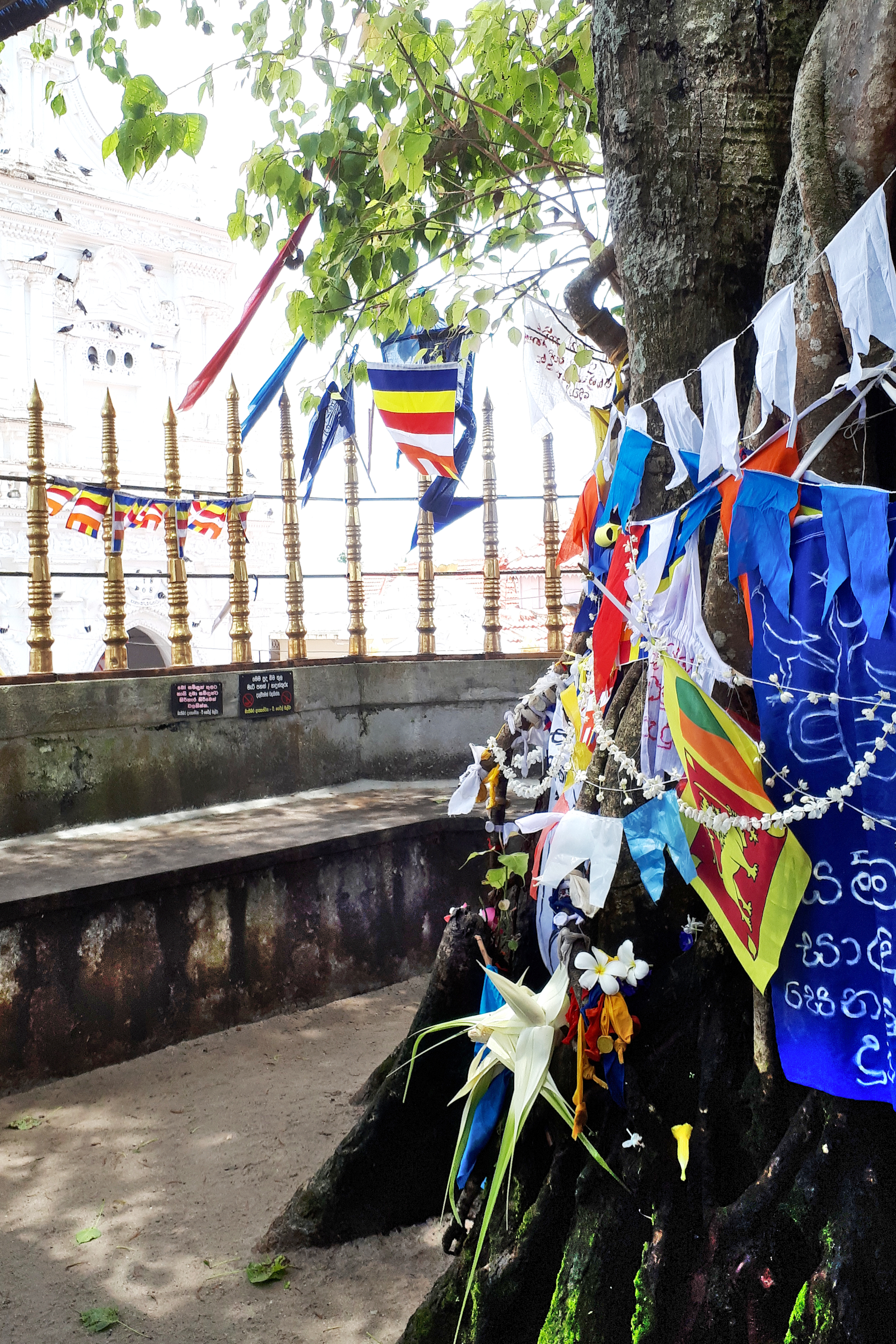
Vows made and tied on the Sacred Bo tree at Kande Viharaya, Aluthgama.

The relic chamber of the temple is believed to be the oldest building in the temple premises. At the entrance of the chamber is sculptured with a stone moonstone and a door frame. Inner walls and the ceiling of the chamber has been adorned with Kandyan Era Frescoes belonging to the latter part of the Kandyan period. The image house of the temple is consist of an inner chamber and an outer chamber. Entrance to the image house is a magnetic looking Thorana with three arch shaped entrances. Inside the inner chamber three Buddha images in the standing, seated and sleeping postures can be seen. The walls and the ceilings of both chambers have been decorated with Jataka tales, moments of the Buddha's journey of life and various types of other murals.

== See also ==
- List of Archaeological Protected Monuments in Sri Lanka

== Sources ==
- "PART I : SECTION (I) — GENERAL Government Notifications" (PDF). The Gazette of the Democratic Socialist Republic of Sri Lanka. 1919. 12 June 2015. Archived from the original (PDF) on 2017-04-04.
