= Lankatilaka Vihara =

Buddhist temple in Sri Lanka

- ලංකාතිලක විහාරය இலங்காதிலக விகாரை
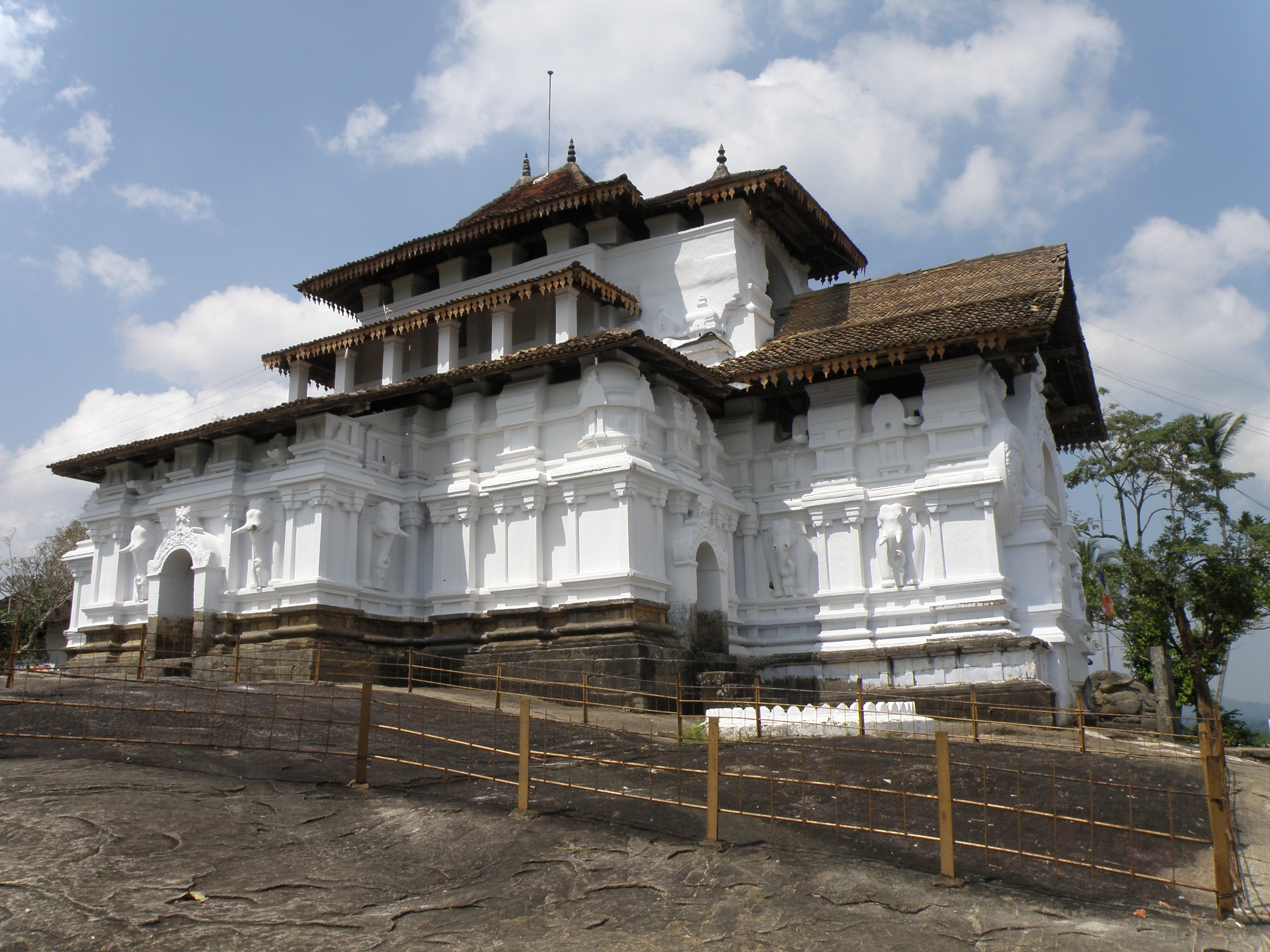

Religion
- Affiliation: Buddhism
- District: Mahanuwara
- Province: Central Province

Location
- Location: Kandy, Sri Lanka
- Municipality: Kandy
- Interactive map of Lankatilaka Vihara
- Coordinates: 7°14′02″N 80°33′54″E

Architecture
- Type: Buddhist Temple
- Founder: King Bhuvanekabahu IV
- Archaeological Protected Monument of Sri Lanka
- Designated: 16 December 1949

Lankatilaka Vihara (Sinhala: ලංකාතිලක විහාරය, romanized: laṁkātilaka vihāraya, Tamil: இலங்காதிலக விகாரை, romanized: Ilaṅkātilaka vikārai) is a Buddhist temple with integrated Hindu shrines situated in Udunuwara of Kandy, Sri Lanka. It is located on Daulagala road approximately 4 km (2.5 mi) away from Pilimatalawa junction and a few kilometres from the temple, Gadaladeniya Vihara. It is considered the most magnificent architectural edifice created during the Gampola era.

== History ==
The history of the temple goes back to the 14th century. According to historical reports this temple was built during the time of King Bhuvanekabahu IV, who reigned from 1341 to 1351 A.D. He entrusted the construction of this temple to his Chief Minister named Senalankadhikara, who successfully finished the works of this temple. The architecture of the temple was designed by a South Indian architect named Sathapati Rayar. According to Professor Senarath Paranavithana, Sathapati Rayar designed this temple using Tamil Pandya sculptors brought from Tamil Nadu in Hindu style. in the 13th century, Polonnaruwa era and also with other Dravidian and Indo Chinese architectural patterns.It was also built during the Gampola era.

== The temple ==
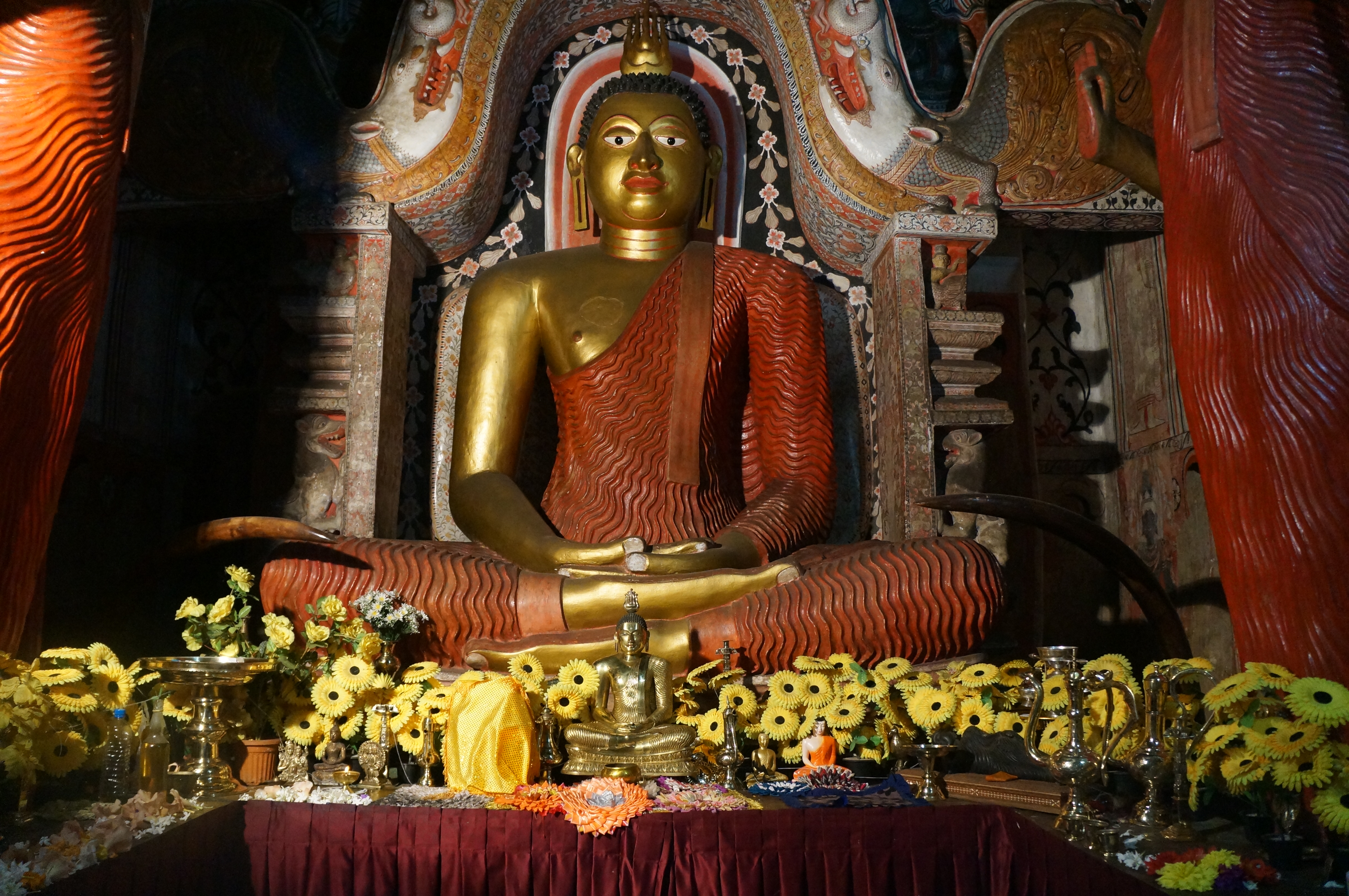
A Buddha image with Makara Thorana

The vihara buildings have been built on a natural rock called Panhalgala Rock. Among the buildings, the image house possesses characteristically outstanding architectural features, embellished with traditional Sinhalese sculptures. According to the facts recorded in the Lankatilake copper plaque, this image house was constructed as a four-storied mansion with a height of eighty feet, but today only 3 stories can be seen. The walls and the ceiling of the image house have been adorned with the Kandyan era paintings and sculptures.

Rock curved inscriptions found in the temple premises with both Sinhala and Tamil sections, proclaim about the initiators and the facilities gifted to this temple by the kings. According to historian K. Indrapala, the temple inhibits the longest Tamil inscription found in Sri Lanka, which suggests that the pre-colonial kingdoms used Tamil alongside Sinhala as official languages.

== Architectural Features and Protection Status ==
The entrance of Lankatilaka Vihara features two intricately carved balustrades known as ''Gajasinha korawakgala'' (elephant-lion balustrades). These are designed in the advanced ''makaragala'' style, representing mythical beasts that incorporate symbolic elements from various animals: an elephant’s trunk (dexterity), lion’s paws (strength), crocodile’s jaw (discipline), boar’s ears (sensitivity), fish body (movement), and peacock feathers (beauty). These balustrades also include elaborate floral motifs, showcasing the high craftsmanship of the period.

Lankatilaka Vihara was also declared an archaeological protected monument on 16 December 1949, recognizing its cultural and historical importance.

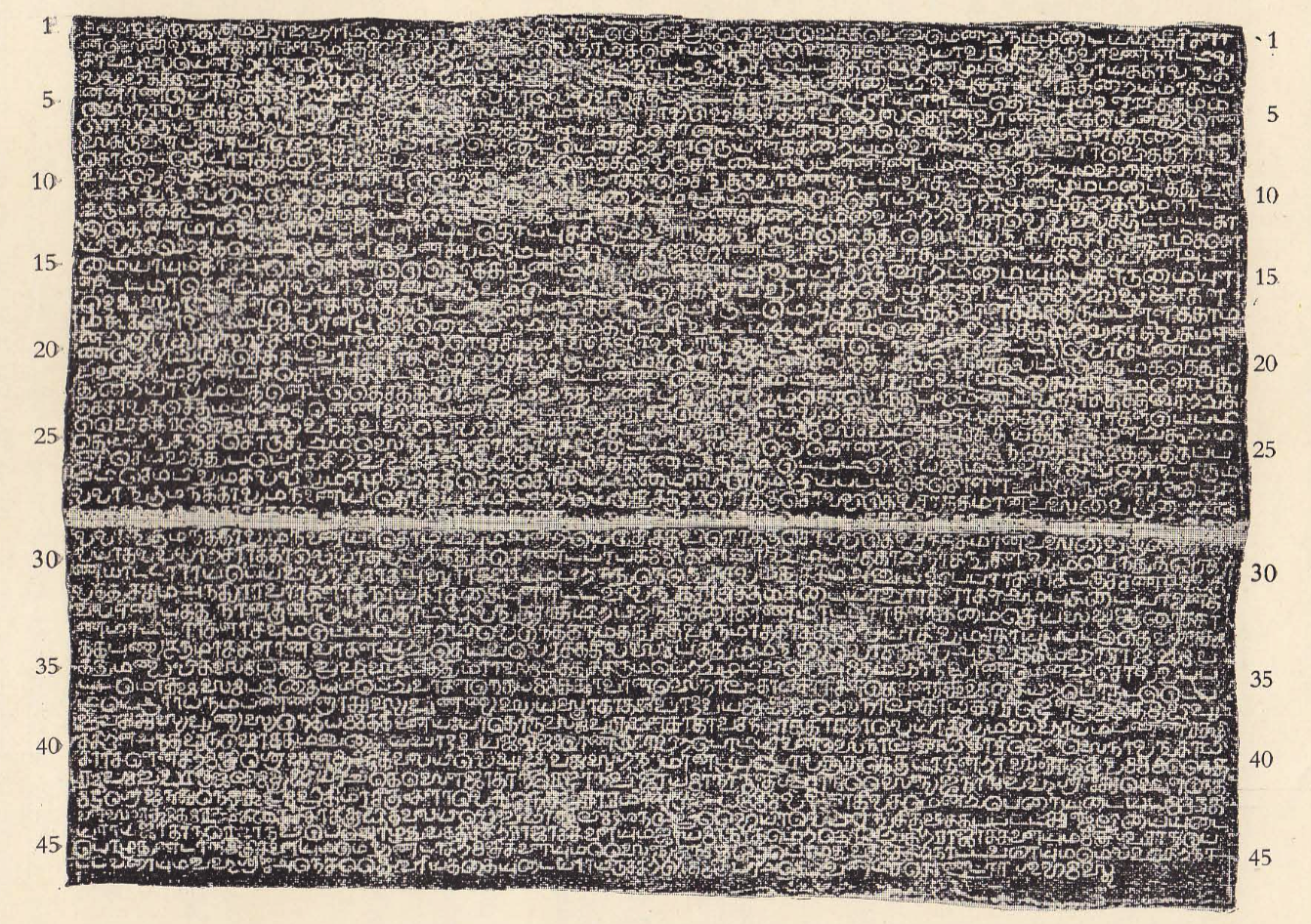
Lankatilaka Vihara inscription in Tamil of Bhuvanaikabahu IV - 14th century AD

== Devales ==
The image house of the Lankatilaka is enriched with six devales. The gods: Upulvan; Ganapathi; Saman; Vibhishana, Kataragama deviyo and Kumara Bandara are worshipped here. Kumara bandara is believed to be the deity, who protects the Lankatilaka vihara.

== Access ==
Lankatilaka Vihara is located in Hiyarapitiya, near the town of Pilimathalawa in the Kandy District. The temple can be accessed via two primary routes: the Daulagala road from Peradeniya and the Gadaladeniya road from Pilimathalawa. Both roads lead through scenic village surroundings and offer easy access to nearby historic temples such as Gadaladeniya Vihara and Embekka Devalaya.

== See also ==
- List of Archaeological Protected Monuments in Sri Lanka
