= Kingdom of Gampola =

Former kingdom in Sri Lanka

Kingdom of Gampola ගම්පොළ රාජධානිය
- 1341–1408
- Gurula Dadaya Punkalasa-Ira; Emblem of Vikramabahu III
- Capital: Gangasiripura
- Common languages: Sinhala
- Religion: Theravada Buddhism
- Government: Monarchy
- King
  - 1341–1353: Bhuvanekabahu IV
  - 1341–1353: Parakramabahu V
  - 1357–1374: Vikramabahu III
  - 1372–1391: Bhuvanekabahu V
  - 1391-1397: Virabahu Āpāna
  - 1397–1408: Vira Alakesvara
  - 1408-1410: Parakramabahu Āpāna
- Historical era: Transitional period
  - Established: 1341
  - Disestablished: 1408
Preceded by	Succeeded by
Kingdom of Dambadeniya	Kingdom of Kotte

The Kingdom of Gampola (Sinhala: ගම්පොළ රාජධානිය, romanized: Gampola Rajadhaniya), also known as Ganga Sri Pura or Gangasiripura, was a medieval Sinhalese kingdom in present-day Central Province of Sri Lanka, near Kandy. It emerged in the mid-14th century when King Bhuvanekabahu IV, son of King Vijayabahu V, transferred the royal capital from Kurunegala to Gampola with the support of General Senalankadhikara. Bhuvanekabahu IV ruled for approximately four years, establishing Gampola as the political centre of the kingdom and marking the beginning of the Gampola period in Sri Lankan history.

After his death, his brother, King Parakramabahu V (1353 AD–1359 AD), who used to reign from Dedigama ascended the throne and moved to Gampola. He was dethroned by King Bhuvanekabahu IV's son, King Vikramabahu III (1359 AD–1374 AD) and sent to Malaya.

King Vikramabahu III conveyed the tooth relic to Gampola and held a festival in honour of this sacred relic. He built a shrine at Niyamgampaya in Gampola. The rock temple Gadaladeniya Viharaya was constructed by king Vikramabahu III. Meanwhile, a general called Alagakkonara became more powerful than the king as they helped to defeat Arya Chakravarthi, a Tamil ruler who had grabbed the throne of the Jaffna Kingdom.

There are many Buddhist temples belonging to the Gampola era like Lankatilaka Vihara and Embekka Devalaya.

The last king of Gampola was King Bhuvanaikabahu V. He ruled the island for 29 years. At the same time, King Vira bahu II (1392–1397 AD) ruled Raigama. King Vijayabahu VI (1397-1411 AD), who is from the Alagakkonara family, grabbed the throne from king Vira Bahu II. The Chinese ambassador Zheng He, who was unhappy with the change of hands, carried off King Vijayabahu VI to China in 1411 AD. The next kingdom was the Kotte kingdom. A separate city was built in Kotte during this time by a noble known as Alagakkonara.
