= Lothair Crystal =

9th-century engraved gem

Lothair Crystal or Susanna Crystal
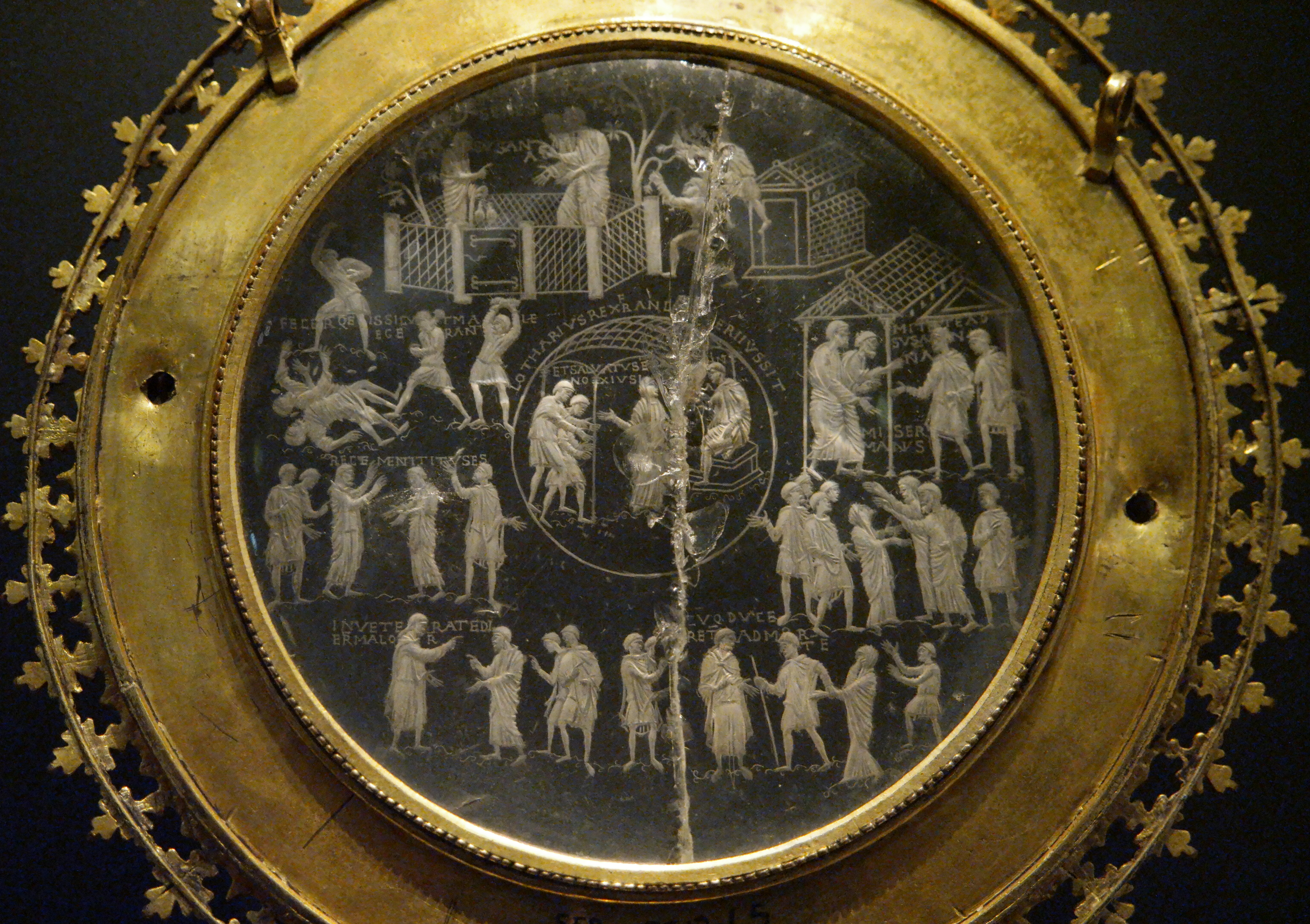
- Material: Quartz; Gilt copper (frame)
- Size: Weight: 650 grams (incl frame); Diameter: 115 mm (4.5 in) (crystal); Diameter: 183 mm (7.2 in) (incl frame); Thickness: 13 mm (0.51 in)
- Writing: Latin
- Created: 15th century (frame), 855–869 (crystal)
- Period/culture: Carolingian (crystal), Medieval (frame)
- Place: River Meuse
- Present location: Room 41, British Museum
- Identification: BL.1295; 1855,1201.5

The Lothair Crystal (also known as the Lothar Crystal or the Susanna Crystal) is an engraved gem from Lotharingia in northwest Europe, showing scenes of the biblical story of Susanna, dating from 855–869. The Lothair Crystal is an object in the collection of the British Museum.

== Description ==
The original element of the work is a circular disc of clear quartz ("rock crystal"), measuring 11.5 centimetres (4.5 in) in diameter. This is engraved in intaglio with eight scenes depicting the story of Susanna and the Elders, related in the Book of Daniel (but regarded as part of the Apocrypha by Protestants). Susanna is first shown being falsely accused and condemned for adultery by the elders. Daniel intervenes to question the elders, uncovers their false witness and engineers their execution by stoning. In the final scene, Susanna is declared to be innocent. The scenes are accompanied by brief inscriptions in Latin drawn from the Vulgate Bible.

The engravings on the crystal are executed in the energetic and distinctive early mediæval Rheims style which originated in manuscript drawings such as those in the Utrecht Psalter. The crystal is surrounded by a 15th-century gilt-copper mount with a foliage border, which might have been once attributed to Saint Eligius (c. 588 – 660), the patron saint of goldsmiths.

== Dating ==
The crystal is inscribed LOTHARIVS REX FRANC[ORVM ME FI]ERI IVSSIT ('Lothair, King of the Franks, ordered me to be made'), which possibly refers to Lothair II. Lothair I called himself imperator (emperor), whereas Lothar II called himself rex (king), like the patron of the crystal; it is therefore probable that it was created in Lothair II's time, probably around the middle of the 9th century, making it a late example of Carolingian art.

Others have commented on the unusual wording of Lothair II's titles, as he never called himself "of the Franks". Moreover, Lothair II's name was at the time of the work's creation always spelled and pronounced as Hlotharius. The "h" was dropped in Old Low Franconian only at the end of the 9th century, which would suggest that the line would have been added after Lothair II's reign, or that the crystal might have been made by someone else. Simon MacLean therefore suggested that it was the 10th-century king Lothair of France who would have ordered the crystal to be made. Mats Dijkdrent on the other hand thinks that the line could have been added to make it a more convincing relic made by Saint Eligius who, according to his vita, would have worked for a certain Lothar, king of the Franks (actually Clothar II).

== History ==
No textual sources on the history of the Lothair Crystal prior to the 10th century are known. Around the 10th century, it was pawned between a count and a canon of Rheims in exchange for a horse. The canon then denied possession of the crystal. It was later discovered to be in his possession when the canon was smoked out of the cathedral when it was set alight. In penance, he founded Waulsort Abbey (in modern Belgium), where the crystal was held until the 18th century. During part of this period, it was utilised by the abbots to fasten their copes during mass.

In 1793, revolutionary French forces sacked Waulsort and threw the crystal into the River Meuse, reputedly cracking it in the process. In the 19th century it was stolen and stripped of its jewels. It reappeared in the hands of a Belgian dealer, who claimed it had been retrieved from the river bed and sold it to a French collector for twelve francs. It passed to the British Liberal politician Ralph Bernal, who paid £10 for it. In 1855 it was acquired by Augustus Wollaston Franks on behalf of the British Museum in an auction of Bernal's collection at Christie's for £267.

The Lothair Crystal was Object 53 in the 2010 BBC Radio 4 programme A History of the World in 100 Objects, chosen and presented by the Director of the British Museum, Neil MacGregor.

== Interpretation ==
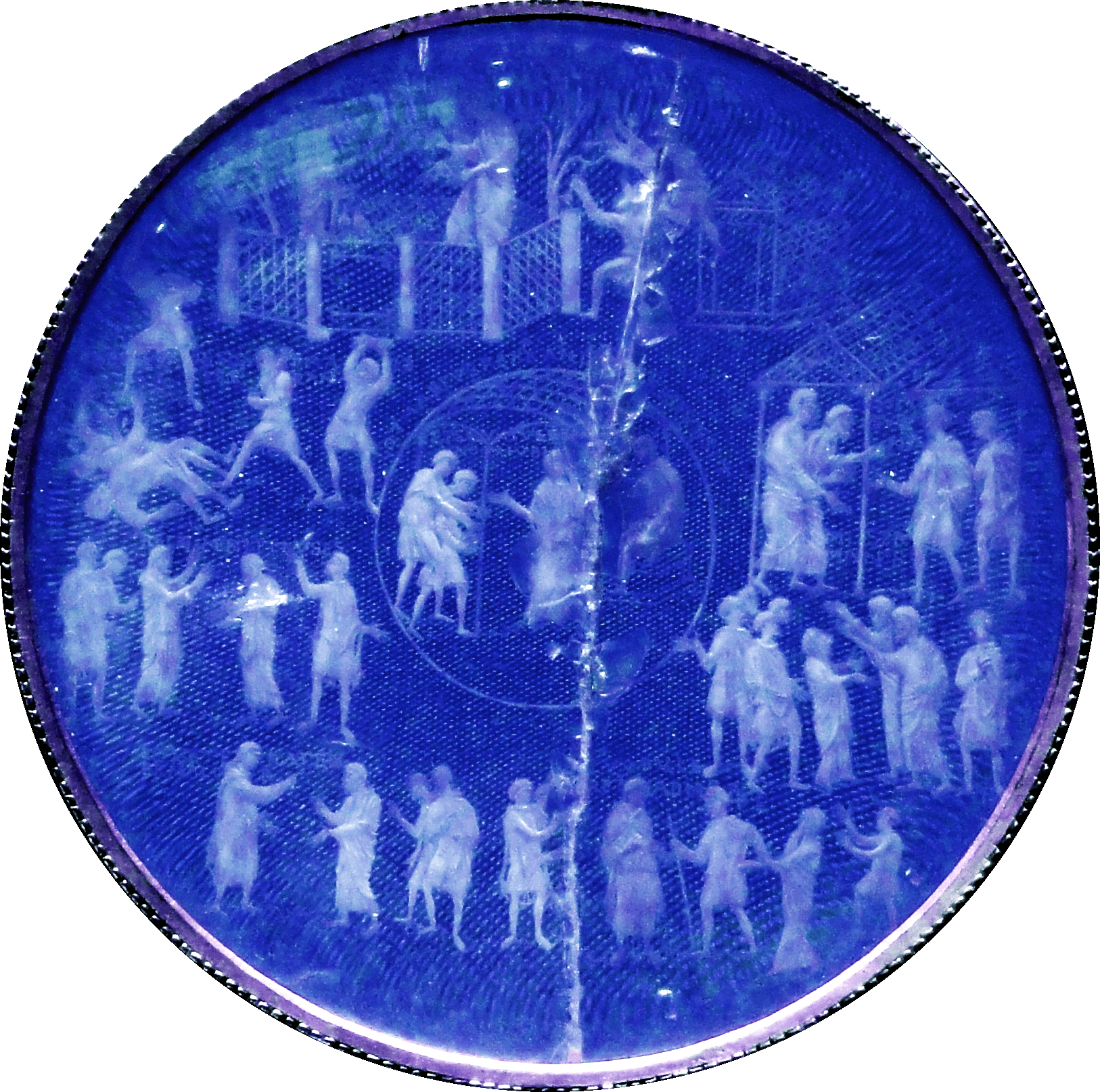
Enhanced image of the engraving.

The crystal is one of a small number of Carolingian engraved gems created for the circles around the court, although its form does not closely resemble any of the others. A gem with Lothair's portrait that was probably his personal seal was set a hundred years after his death into the processional Cross of Lothair in Aachen Cathedral. A number of interpretations have been advanced for the crystal's function as well as its meaning and significance to the Lotharingian court; its meaning is unclear and it has been the subject of ongoing controversy among scholars.

The subject matter of the crystal suggests that it was meant to be shown at court as a symbol of the king's role in the dispensation of justice. Its design may be an allusion to the breastplate of justice worn by the Kohen Gadol (the Jewish High Priest). Under this interpretation, the crystal may have been an attempt to show visually the ruler's responsibility to provide justice, using a biblical parallel to exhort him to uphold the ideal of wise rule exemplified by the just kings of the Old Testament. Alternatively, the subject of the crystal symbolises an idealised relationship between Church and state, with Susanna representing the Church being protected from her enemies by the just decisions of the ruler.

Valerie Flint has argued that the crystal is related to the acrimonious divorce of Lothair and his wife Theutberga, whom he accused of committing incest and practising abortion. It depicts the vindication of a wife falsely accused of a sexual crime, and the type of rock crystal from which it is made was used by the Franks as an amulet. Flint suggests that the crystal was designed in 865, when Lothar had a temporary reconciliation with his wife, to serve both as a reproach to the king for his conduct and as a charm to protect the royal couple against evil.

== See also ==
- Cross of Lothair
- Saint-Denis Crystal

Preceded by 52: Harem wall painting fragments	A History of the World in 100 Objects; Object 53	Succeeded by 54: Statue of Tara
