= Pilimathalawa =

Pilimathalawa පිළිමතලාව
- Suburb
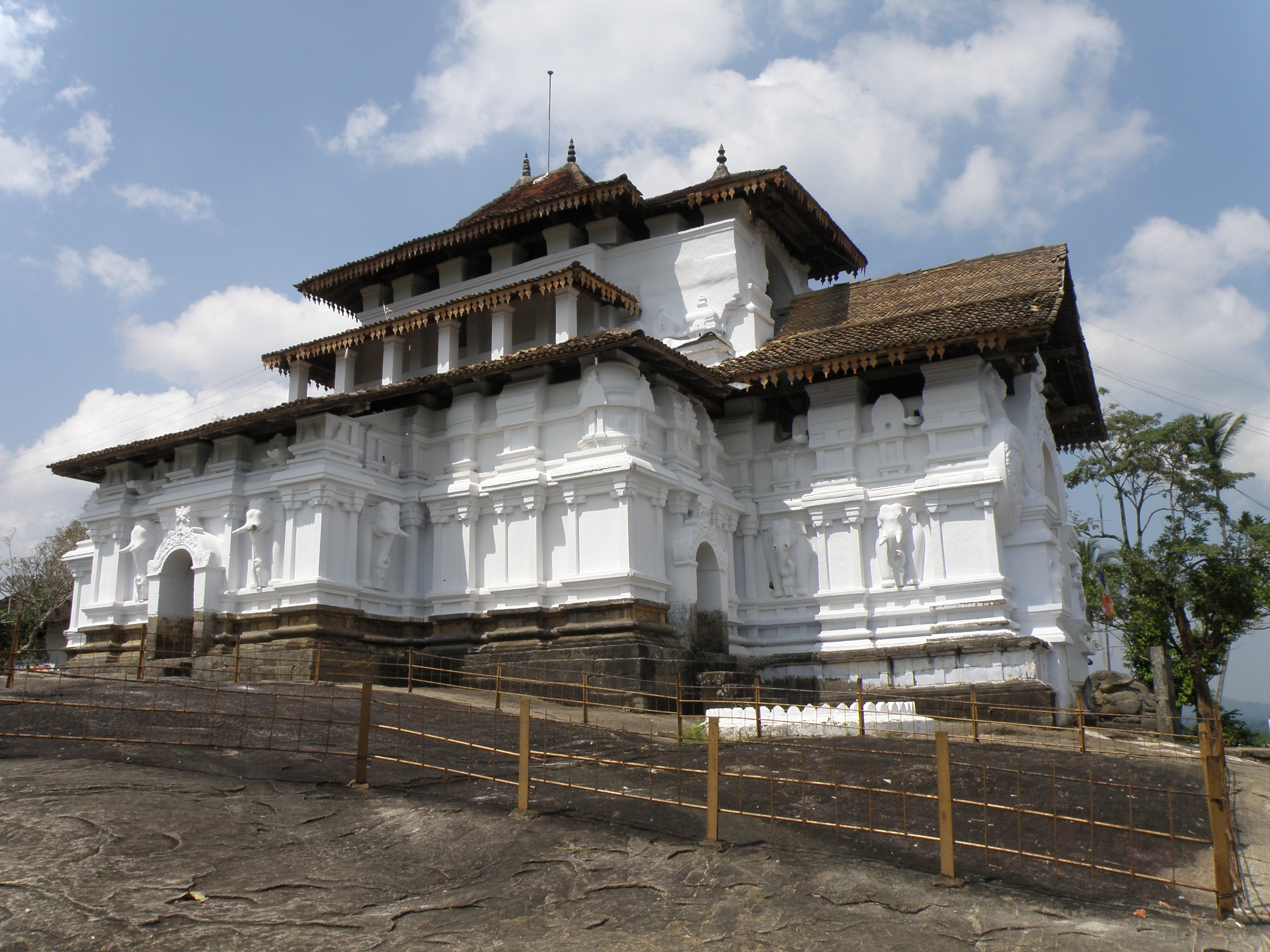
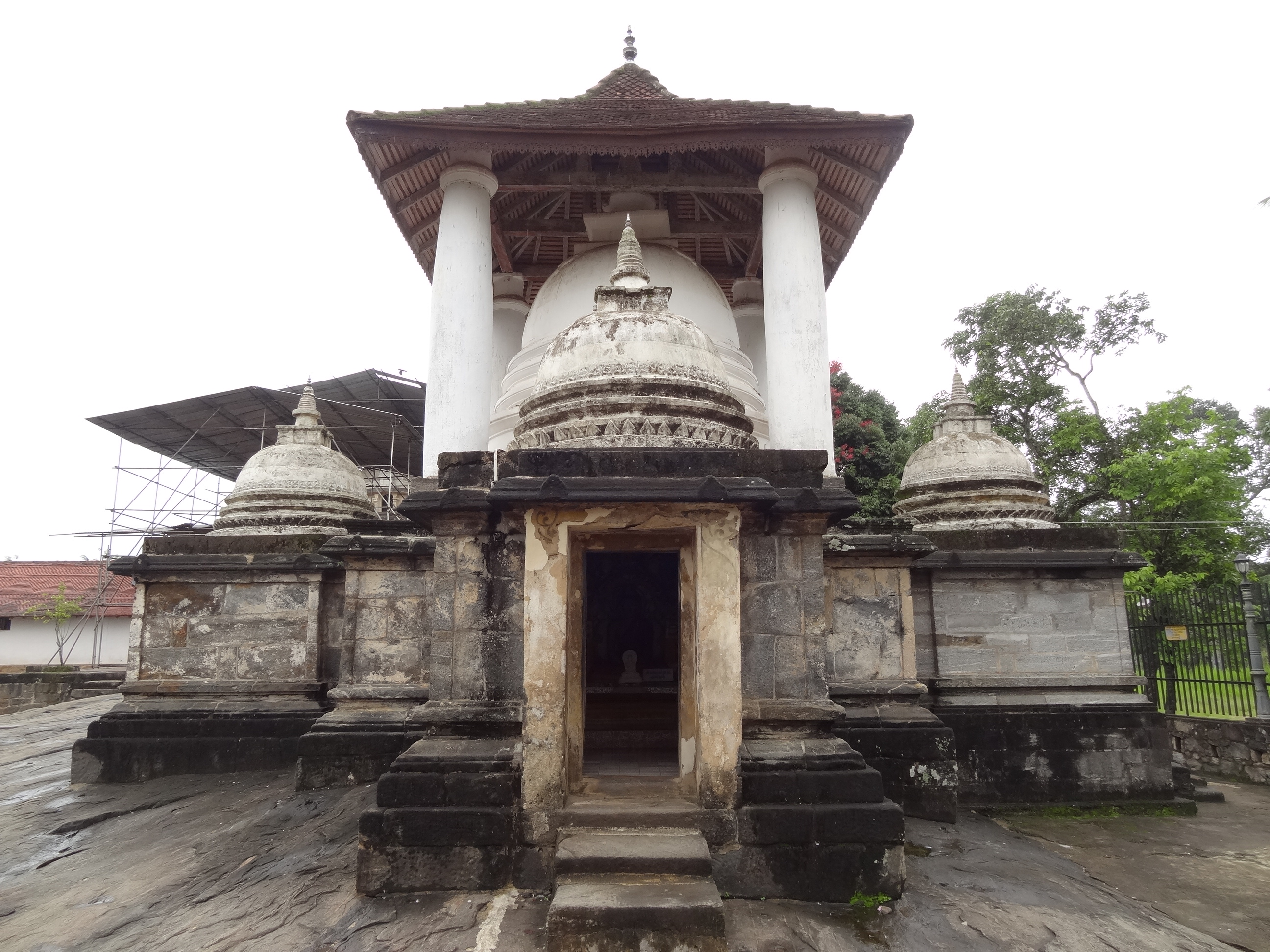
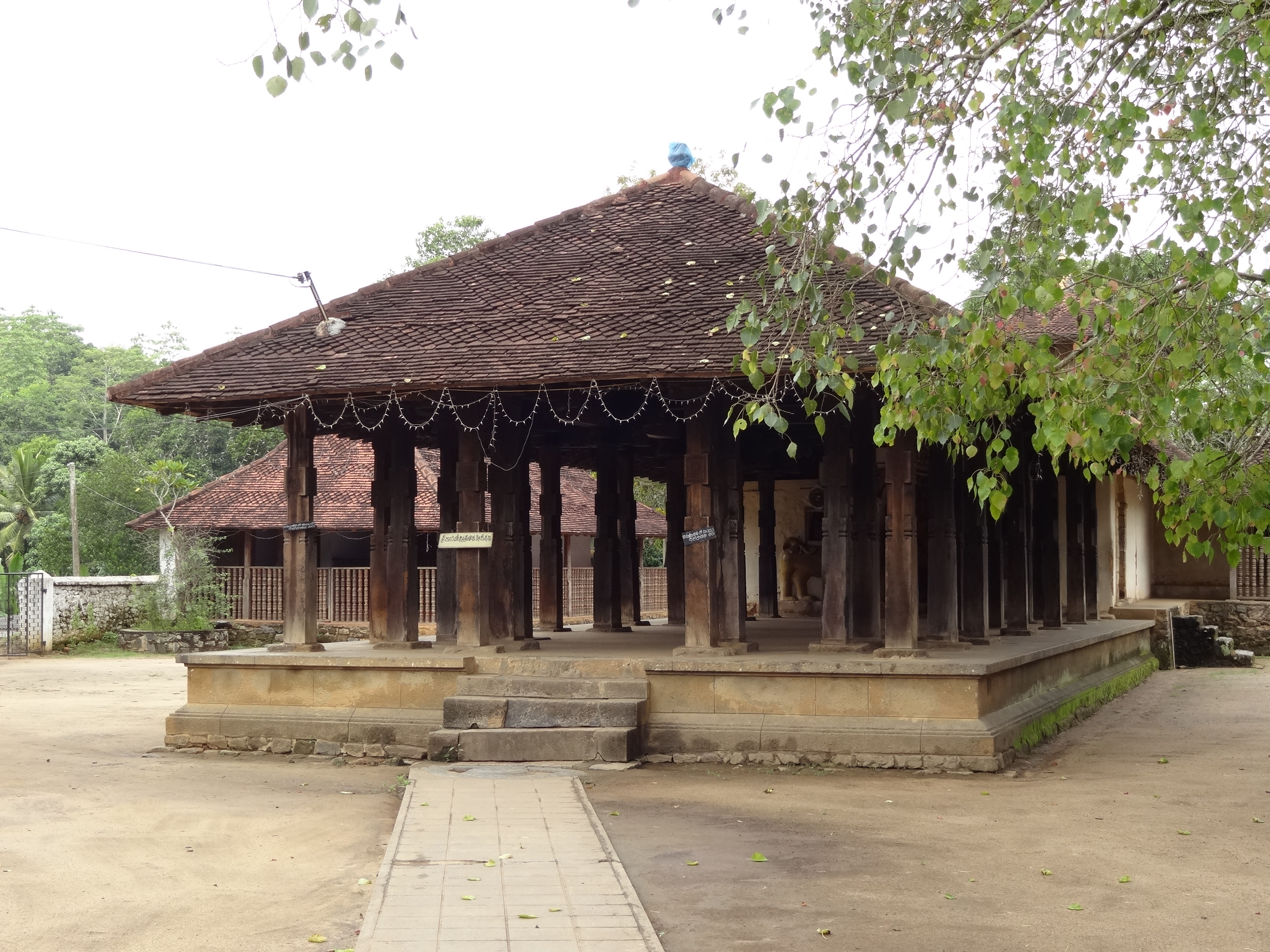
- Lankatilaka Vihara Gadaladeniya Vihara Embekka Devalaya

- Location within Sri Lanka
- Coordinates: 7°16′02″N 80°34′0″E
- Country: Sri Lanka
- Province: Central Province
- District: Kandy District
- Time zone: UTC+5:30 (SLST)

Pilimathalawa (also spelled as Pilimatalawa; Sinhala: පිළිමතලාව) is a suburb of the city of Kandy, in the Central Province of Sri Lanka. It is governed by the Kadugannawa Urban Council. The town is situated 10 km away from Kandy, the district capital, and 104 km away from Colombo.

Thalawa means flat area in Sinhalese, while pilima means statue. However, the town's name may or may not have been formed by these words. The town's modern name is simply a standardization of its ancient village name.

Pilimathalawa is famous for traditional brassware. The Gadaladeniya, Lankathilaka Buddhist temples and the Embekka temple are notable destinations in Pilimathalawa. The town is also home to the Theological College of Lanka.

== See also ==
- Kandy
- Peradeniya
- Kadugannawa
