= Ming–Kotte War =

Conflict between Ming-dynasty China and the Kotte Kingdom (1410/11)

- Part of the Ming treasure voyages
Date	1410 or 1411
Location	Kotte, Sri Lanka
Result	Ming victory: Overthrow of Alakeshvara; Ascension of Parakramabahu VI

Belligerents
Ming China	Kingdom of Kotte

Commanders and leaders
Admiral Zheng He	King Alakeshvara

Strength
A fleet crew of over 27,000, including non-combatant personnel: 2,000 troops at Kotte	50,000 troops

The Ming–Kotte War was a military conflict between the expeditionary forces of Ming China and the Sinhalese Kotte Kingdom in the southern territories of Sri Lanka. The conflict happened when Ming China's treasure fleet arrived at Sri Lanka in 1410 or 1411. It resulted in the overthrow of King Alakeshvara and the ascension of Parakramabahu VI.

== Background ==
The kingdoms of Kotte and Jaffna had been in wars against each other. In these wars, Alakeshvara of the Alagakkonara family gained prestige due to his military successes. He had the de facto rule over Kotte under a puppet king from the previous royal dynasty and eventually usurped the throne of the kingdom.

During the Ming treasure voyages, a large Chinese fleet, led by Admiral Zheng He, arrived into local waters to establish Chinese control and stability of the maritime routes in the waters around Sri Lanka and southern India. Alakeshvara posed a threat to Chinese trade by committing piracy and hostilities in the local waters.

Due to Alakeshvara's hostilities against the Chinese presence in Sri Lanka during the first Ming treasure voyage, Zheng decided to leave the island for other destinations. It is probable that the then-prince Parakramabahu VI or others acting on his behalf solicited aid from Zheng during this time, so the Chinese admiral adopted a hostile attitude to Alakeshvara and espoused the cause of this prince. During the third Ming treasure voyage, the Chinese fleet returned to the Kotte Kingdom. This time, the Chinese came to depose Alakeshvara by military force. Dreyer (2007) states that the confrontation against Alakeshvara in Sri Lanka most likely happened during the outward journey of the Chinese fleet in 1410, rather than the homeward journey in 1411, but he also notes that most authorities think that the confrontation happened during the homeward journey in 1411.

== War ==
On their return to Sri Lanka, the Chinese were overbearing and contemptuous of the Sinhalese, whom they considered to be rude, disrespectful, and hostile. They also resented that the Sinhalese were committing hostilities towards neighboring countries that had diplomatic relations with Ming China. Zheng He and a contingent of 2,000 Chinese troops traveled overland into Kotte, because Alakeshvara had lured them into his territory. Alakeshvara cut off Zheng and his troops from the Chinese treasure fleet anchored at Colombo. He planned to launch a surprise attack on the fleet.

In response, Zheng and his contingent of troops invaded Kotte and conquered its capital. They captured Alakeshvara with his family and principal officials. The Sinhalese army hastily returned and surrounded the capital, but was repeatedly defeated in battle by the Chinese troops. For six days, the Chinese fought their way back to the fleet.

== Aftermath ==
Straight-away, their dens and hideouts we ravaged,
And made captive that entire country,
Bringing back to our august capital,
Their women, children, families and retainers, leaving not one,
Cleaning out in a single sweep those noxious pests, as if winnowing chaff from grain...
These insignificant worms, deserving to die ten thousand times over, trembling in fear...
Did not even merit the punishment of Heaven.
Thus the august emperor spared their lives,
And they humbly kowtowed, making crude sounds and
Praising the sage-like virtue of the imperial Ming ruler.

— Yang Rong (1515) about the confrontation in Sri Lanka

The conflict resulted in the overthrow of King Alakeshvara of the Alagakkonara family. After their voyage, Zheng He returned to Nanjing on 6 July 1411 and presented the Sinhalese captives to the Yongle Emperor, who eventually decided to free Alakeshvara and return him to Sri Lanka.

The Chinese were allied with Parakramabahu VI and dethroned Alakeshvara in favor of him. The Yongle Emperor requested from the Ministry of Rites to recommend someone to serve as the new king of Kotte. As documented in Chinese records, Parakramabahu VI was elected by the Sinhalese present at the Ming court, nominated by the Ming emperor, and installed with the backing of Zheng and his fleet. Both economic and diplomatic relations between China and Sri Lanka improved, with Parakramavahu VI as the ruler in Sri Lanka. The Chinese treasure fleet experienced no hostilities during visits to Sri Lanka on subsequent voyages.

On 13 September 1411, the emperor granted both rewards and promotions for those who participated in the Sinhalese confrontation after the joint recommendation of the Ministry of War and the Ministry of Rites.

== See also ==
- Battle of Palembang (1407)

== Bibliography ==
- Dreyer, Edward L. (2007). Zheng He: China and the Oceans in the Early Ming Dynasty, 1405–1433. New York, NY: Pearson Longman. ISBN 9780321084439.
- Finlay, Robert (1991). "The Treasure-Ships of Zheng He: Chinese Maritime Imperialism in the Age of Discovery". Terrae Incognitae. 23 (1): 1–12. doi:10.1179/tin.1991.23.1.1.
- Holt, John Clifford (1991). Buddha in the Crown: Avalokiteśvara in the Buddhist Traditions of Sri Lanka. Oxford, England: Oxford University Press. ISBN 0-19-506418-6.
- Levathes, Louise (1996). When China Ruled the Seas: The Treasure Fleet of the Dragon Throne, 1405–1433. New York, NY: Oxford University Press. ISBN 9780195112078.
- Mills, J. V. G. (1970). Ying-yai Sheng-lan: 'The Overall Survey of the Ocean's Shores' [1433]. Cambridge, England: Cambridge University Press. ISBN 0-521-01032-2.
- Paranavitana, S; Nicolas, Cyril. A concise history of Ceylon.
- Ray, Haraprasad (1987). "An Analysis of the Chinese Maritime Voyages into the Indian Ocean during Early Ming Dynasty and their Raison d'Etre". China Report. 23 (1): 65–87. doi:10.1177/000944558702300107. S2CID 154116680.
