= Virabahu Āpāna =

Vira Bahu II
- King of Gampola
- Reign: 1390-1397
- Predecessor: Bhuvanaikabahu V
- Successor: Vira Alakesvara
- Issue: 2 sons
- Dynasty: House of Siri Sanga Bo

Vira Bahu II was King of Gampola who ruled from 1390 to 1397. He succeeded Bhuvanaikabahu V and was succeeded by Vira Alakesvara. He may have been succeeded by two of his sons in 1397.

== See also ==
- List of Sri Lankan monarchs
- History of Sri Lanka

Virabahu Āpāna Born: ? ? Died: ? ?
Regnal titles
Preceded by Bhuvanaikabahu V	King of Gampola; 1391/2 - 1397	Succeeded by Vira Alakesvara
