= Parakramabahu Āpāna =

Parakrama Bahu Epa
- King of Gampola
- Reign: 1409-1412
- Predecessor: Vira Alakesvara
- Successor: Parakramabahu VI as King of Kotte
- Dynasty: House of Siri Sanga Bo

Parakrama Bahu Epa was the King of Gampola who ruled from 1409 to 1412. He succeeded Vira Alakesvara as king and was the last to reign in Gampola.

== See also ==
- List of Sri Lankan monarchs
- History of Sri Lanka

Parakramabahu Āpāna Born: ? ? Died: ? ?
Regnal titles
Preceded by Vira Alakesvara	King of Gampola; 1409–1412	Succeeded by Parakramabahu VI as King of Kotte
