= Parakramabahu V =

Parakkamabahu V
- King of Gampola
- Reign: 1344/5-1359
- Predecessor: Bhuvanaikabahu IV
- Successor: Vikramabahu III
- Born: 1311
- Died: Unknown
- Dynasty: House of Siri Sanga Bo
- Father: Vijayabahu V

Parakramabahu V (born 1311) was King of Gampola who ruled from 1344 or 1345 to 1359. He was the Second King of Gampola co-ruling with his brother Bhuvanaikabahu IV, and was succeeded by his nephew Vikramabahu III. Parakramabahu spent his last days as a refugee in the Principality of Ruhuna after the domain was invaded.

== See also ==
- List of Sri Lankan monarchs
- History of Sri Lanka

Parakramabahu V Born: ? 1311 Died: ? ?
Regnal titles
Preceded by Bhuvanaikabahu IV	King of Gampola; 1344/5-1359	Succeeded by Vikramabahu III
