= Bhuvanekabahu V =

Bhuvanaikabahu V
- King of Gampola
- Royal Standard of Bhuvanekabahu V
- Reign: 1372/3-1391/2
- Predecessor: Vikramabahu III
- Successor: Vira Bahu II
- Dynasty: House of Siri Sanga Bo
- Father: Nissanka Alakeswara

Bhuvanaikabahu V was King of Gampola who ruled from 1372 to 1391/2. He succeeded his uncle Vikramabahu III as King of Gampola and was succeeded by Vira Bahu II.

== Arms ==
Royal Standard of Bhuvanekabahu V when he was in Dedigama

== See also ==
- List of Sri Lankan monarchs
- History of Sri Lanka

Bhuvanekabahu V Born: ? ? Died: ? ?
Regnal titles
Preceded by Vikramabahu III	King of Gampola; 1372/3-1391/2	Succeeded by Vira Bahu II
