= Yang Rong =

Yang Rong is the name of:

- Yang Rong (businessman) (仰融, born 1957), Chinese businessman
- Yang Rong (actress) (杨蓉, born 1981), Chinese actress
- Yang Rong (mandarin) (楊榮, 1371–1440), Chinese scholar-official during the Ming dynasty
