= Statue of Tara =

Sri Lankan sculpture of Bodhisattva Tara (7th/8th century)

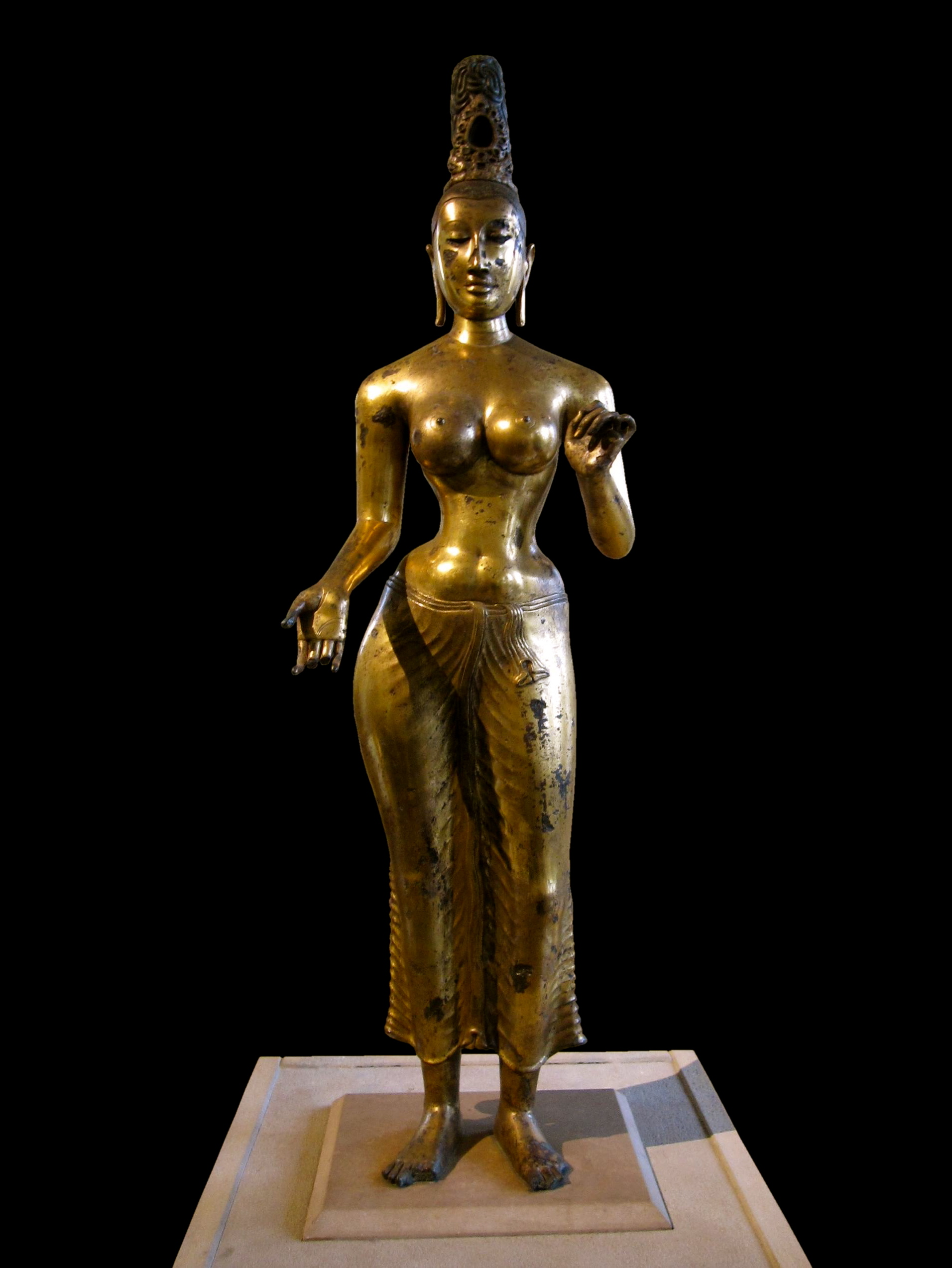
- Material: Gilded Bronze
- Size: 143cm high (4'8")
- Created: 7th–8th century AD
- Present location: British Museum, London
- Identification: 1830,0612.4

The Statue of Tara is a gilt-bronze sculpture of Tara that dates from the 7th–8th century AD in Sri Lanka. Some argue it was looted from the last King of Kandy when the British annexed Kandy in the early nineteenth century. It was given to the British Museum in 1830 by the former British Governor of Ceylon (as Sri Lanka was then known), Robert Brownrigg.

== Background ==
Buddhism has had a continuous history on the island of Sri Lanka ever since the third century BC. The figure dates to the period of Anuradhapura Kingdom founded in 377 BC by King Pandukabhaya. Buddhism played a strong role in the Anuradhapura period, influencing its culture, laws, and methods of governance. Tara shows evidence of the cultural interaction of Buddhism with Hinduism. Tara had been a Hindu mother goddess but was redesigned for a new role within Buddhism. Sri Lanka today is predominantly Theravada Buddhist country.

At one time this statue was thought to be a model of the guardian deity Pattini, but it is now agreed that this statue is of Tara. This identification is clear evidence for the presence in the medieval period of Mahayana Buddhism as well as the Theravada form of the faith which allows Buddhists to worship beings other than Buddha. The Abhayagiri vihāra of the Anuradhapura Kingdom being the most notable example.

The statue suggests that Tara may have been worshiped as a deity and not just as the consort of a male god. Typically the sculpture would have been placed in a temple alongside a statue of her male companion, the bodhisattva, Avalokiteshevara. Bodhisattvas are beings who have reached enlightenment but have turned back from it, out of compassion so that they can still help mankind escape from the cycle of death, rebirth and suffering.

== Description ==
The sculpture represents a standing figure of a female deity solid cast in bronze using the lost wax process. The statue is about three quarter life size and it has been gilded to create the luxurious, golden appearance. The goddess's hour-glass upper body is bare with a lower garment tied to the hips with an almost ankle length hemline. Tara's right hand is shown in the gesture of giving while her left hand is thought to have held a lotus flower, now lost. The figure wears a high crown dominated by a medallion. The hole in the crown is supposed to have held a large precious stone. The statue is the only known Anuradhapura example of this size that now survives. The statue would have been valuable not just from its appearance but also because of its manufacture. The statue was not hollow but made from an expensive metal using a technologically advanced technique of lost wax casting.

== Discovery ==
It has been alleged that this rare sculpture was stolen by the then British Governor, Sir Robert Brownrigg, from the last King of Kandy when the British annexed Kandy. He later donated it to the British Museum in the 1830s. This account differs from that put forward by the British Museum who believe that the statue was simply found in the early 1800s somewhere between Trincomalee and Batticaloa on the eastern coast of Sri Lanka and subsequently acquired by Sir Robert Brownrigg. Kandy came under British rule in March 1815 under the terms of the Kandyan Convention which was organised by Brownrigg.

When the British Museum acquired the statue, in the 1830s, they were concerned that the large exposed breasts, narrow waist and curvaceous hips would be seen as too erotic for the public so it was kept out of sight for thirty years. The statue was only available for scholars to study even though it was never in doubt that the purpose of this statue had always been religious rather than to arouse. This scholarly study is strangely reminiscent of the statue's ancient status in Sri Lanka. It is thought that the statue would have only been seen in Sri Lanka by chosen priests and monks and it would not have been seen by the general population of Buddhists.

== Replica ==
There is a replica of this statue in the National Museum of Colombo in Sri Lanka.

Preceded by 53: Lothair Crystal	A History of the World in 100 Objects; Object 54	Succeeded by 55: Chinese Tang tomb figures
