= Vikramabahu III =

- King of Gampola
- Reign: 1357-1374
- Predecessor: Parakamabahu V
- Successor: Bhuvanaikabahu V
- Dynasty: House of Siri Sanga Bo
- Father: Bhuvanaikabahu IV

Vikramabahu III was King of Gampola who ruled from 1357 to 1374. He succeeded his Uncle Parakramabahu V as King of Gampola and was succeeded by his nephew Bhuvanaikabahu V.

Embekka Devalaya was built during his rule

== See also ==
- List of Sri Lankan monarchs
- History of Sri Lanka

Vikramabahu III Born: ? ? Died: ? ?
Regnal titles
Preceded by Parakamabahu V	King of Gampola; 1357–1374	Succeeded by Bhuvanaikabahu V
