= Bhuvanekabahu IV =

Bhuvanaikabahu IV හතරවන බුවනෙකබාහු
- Rājādhirāja; Siri Saṅgabo; Tri-Sinhaladīswara (Overlord of three Sinhale)
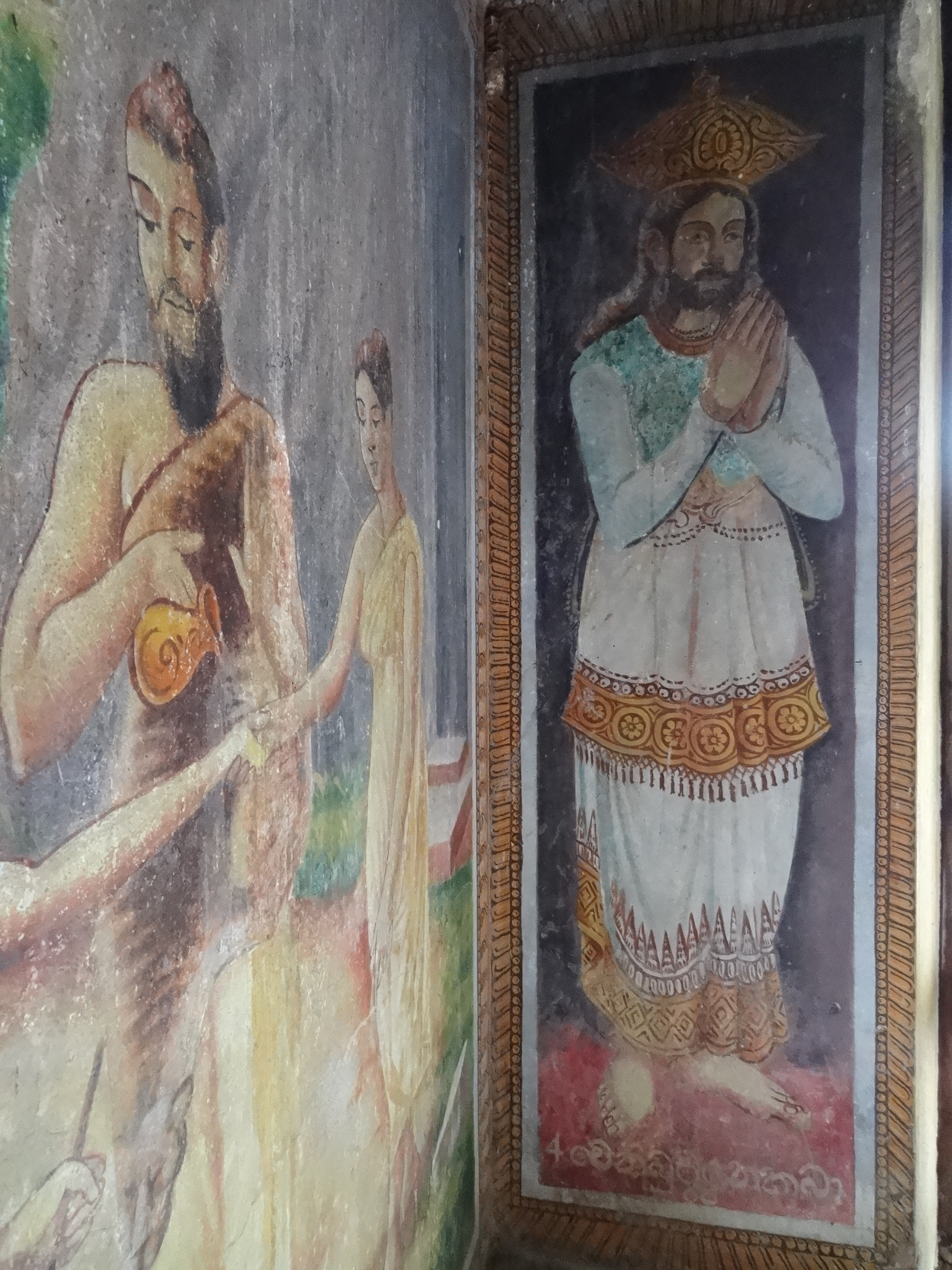
- Bhuvanaikabahu IV painting at the Gadaladeniya Vihara

King of Gampola
- Reign: 1344/5-1353/4
- Predecessor: Vijayabahu V as King of Dambadeniya
- Successor: Parakkamabahu V
- Spouse: Queen Vihara Mahadevi of Gampola
- Issue: Vikramabahu III
- House: House of Siri Sanga Bo
- Father: Vijayabahu V
- Religion: Theravada Buddhism

Bhuvanaikabahu IV (Sinhala: හතරවන බුවනෙකබාහු), was the first King of Gampola who ruled from 1344/45 to 1353/54. He succeeded his father Vijayabahu V of Dambadeniya and became the King of Gampola. He was succeeded by his brother Parakkamabahu V.

He is noted for wearing spectacles made of quartz crystals. He was provided with these spectacles when he found it difficult to read inscriptions of the Gampola era. A lot of temples and Devalas like Gadaladeniya were built during his reign.

== See also ==
- List of Sri Lankan monarchs
- History of Sri Lanka

Bhuvanekabahu IV House of Siri Sanga Bo Born: ? ? Died: ? ?
Regnal titles
Preceded by Kingdom established Vijayabahu V as King of Dambadeniya	King of Gampola; 1344/5–1353/4	Succeeded by Parakkamabahu V
