= Polonnaruwa (disambiguation) =

Polonnaruwa is a town in Sri Lanka. Polonnaruwa may also refer to:

== People ==
- Anikanga of Polonnaruwa, king of Polonnaruwa
- Chodaganga of Polonnaruwa, king of Polonnaruwa
- Dharmasoka of Polonnaruwa, king of Polonnaruwa
- Gajabahu II of Polonnaruwa, king of Polonnaruwa
- Jayabahu I of Polonnaruwa, king of Polonnaruwa
- Kalyanavati of Polonnaruwa, queen of Polonnaruwa
- Lilavati of Polonnaruwa, queen of Polonnaruwa
- Nissanka Malla of Polonnaruwa, king of Polonnaruwa
- Sahassa Malla of Polonnaruwa, king of Polonnaruwa
- Vijayabahu I of Polonnaruwa, king of Polonnaruwa
- Vijayabahu II of Polonnaruwa, king of Polonnaruwa
- Vikramabahu I of Polonnaruwa, king of Polonnaruwa
- Vikramabahu II of Polonnaruwa, king of Polonnaruwa

== Other uses ==
- Kingdom of Polonnaruwa
- Polonnaruwa agreement
- Polonnaruwa District
- Polonnaruwa Electoral District
- Polonnaruwa Electoral District (1947–1989)
- Polonnaruwa massacre
- Polonnaruwa National Cricket Ground
- Polonnaruwa–Pagan War
- Polonnaruwa period, period in Sri Lanka from 1017 to 1232
- Polonnaruwa Polling Division
- Polonnaruwa Vatadage, ancient structure in Polonnaruwa
- Royal Central College, Polonnaruwa
