= Queen Lilavati =

12th- and 13th-century queen of Polonnaruwa

Lilavati ලීලාවතී
- Śrī Rāja Līlāvatī; Abhā Salamevan Līlāvatī
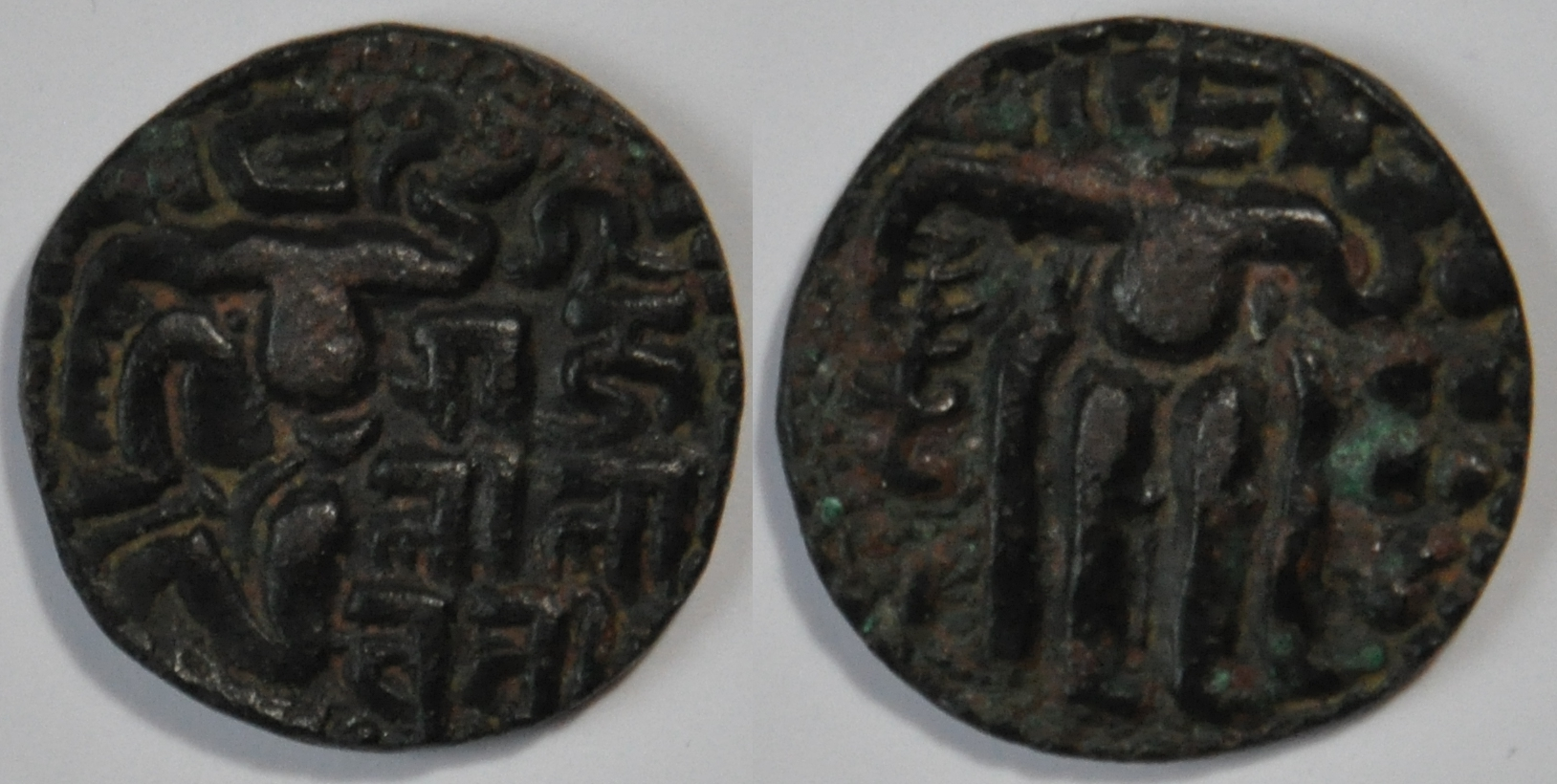
- Copper massa coin of Lilavati

Queen consort of Polonnaruwa
- Tenure: 1153–1186

Queen regnant of Polonnaruwa
- Reign: 1197–1200; 1209–1210; 1211–1212
- Predecessor: Chodaganga; Anikanga Mahadipada; Lokissara
- Successor: Sahassamalla; Lokissara; Parakrama Pandya
- Spouse: Parakramabahu I
- Dynasty: Okkāka dynasty
- Father: King Sri Vallabha
- Mother: Queen Sugala
- Religion: Theravada Buddhism

Lilavati (Sinhala: ලීලාවතී), (also Leelawathi, Leelavathi) reigned as Queen of Polonnaruwa in 1197–1200, 1209–1210, and 1211–1212. She was the fourth woman in Sri Lankan history to rule as sovereign in her own right. Lilavati rose to prominence as the wife of Parakramabahu I, king of the Kingdom of Polonnaruwa. Being of royal descent herself, she then ruled as sole monarch on three occasions in the near-anarchy following Parakramabahu's death, with the backing of various generals. The primary source for her life is the Culavamsa, specifically chapter LXXX.

It is known that Lilavati was the daughter of Sirivallabha Pandya and his wife Sugala, and that she had a brother, also called Manabharana. She would have met her future husband when still young as Parakramabahu was her cousin, the son of her uncle Manabharana Pandya of Dhakkinadesa. Following his death, Kittisrimegha ascended to the throne of Dhakkinadesa, and Manabharana's family came to live with Sirivallabha in Ruhuna. It is not known at what point she married Parakramabahu.

Lilavati's family – in particular her brother Manabharana Pandya of Ruhuna (who was married to both of Parakramabahu's sisters, Mitta and Pabhavati), and the Queen Mother, Sugala – had a very difficult relationship with Parakramabahu. Manabharana fought against Parakramabahu on several occasions, whilst Sugala "had not a mind capable of reflection and was inclined herself by nature to evil". It is not known what role Lilavati played in the complex scheming between them.

== Reign and Death ==
Lilavati's activities during the energetic reign of her husband are not known. As first mahesi ("queen consort"), she would have been the highest-ranking woman in court; her children (if any) would have had first claim to the throne, and on occasion she may even have accompanied the king on campaign. However the Culavamsa does not mention this, or indeed suggest she had any children by Parakramabahu.

The queen re-emerges in the sources in the anarchy following Parakramabahu's death. Vijayabahu II, described as a 'poet king', lasted only a year before he was murdered by 'a traitor...of the Kulinga (sic) clan' named Mahinda. Mahinda in his turn was deposed by Kittinissanka, a Kalinga prince who had been Vijayabahu's chief minister. Kittinissanka reigned from 1187 to 1196 as Nissanka Malla of Polonnaruwa.

Following Nissanka Malla's death, his younger brother Vikramabahu ascended to the throne, and was deposed after only a few months by his nephew Chodaganga. Chodaganga was then deposed by the 'powerful general' Kitti, who, rather than seizing the throne for himself, had Lilavati consecrated sovereign queen.

Lilavati's first reign is described as "three years without mishap" in the Culavamsa. As the first queen of Parakramabahu she would have wielded a kind of legitimacy which other claimants of the throne lacked; furthermore her ancestry was considerably more venerable than that of Kitti or any of Nissanka Malla's house. The respect afforded her could explain how she survived her first deposition, by Sahassamalla, a prince of the Okkaka people, on 23 August 1200.

A succession of rulers followed Sahassamalla, who was deposed in 1202 by the general Ayasmanta. Like Kitti, Ayasmanta refused the throne himself and appointed Nissanka Malla's first mahesi, Kalyanavathi, queen; unlike Kitti however he reserved genuine power for himself. Kalyanavathi was succeeded by the child king Dhammasoka, also under Ayasmanta's sway. In 1209 however the invading Chola armies of Anikanga Mahadipada put both Ayasmanta and Dhammasoka (who would have been around 15 months old) to death.

Lilavati was thrust back into the limelight just seventeen days afterwards, when Anikanga was assassinated by the general Vikkantacamunakka. The Culavamsa describes the general as a 'villain...[who] slew the Monarch Anikaiiga [sic] and had the government carried on for a year by the first consort of King Parakkamabahu [sic], Lilavati by name, who had already reigned before'. Why the previously well-regarded queen was now associating with a villain is not made clear, nor why Ankanga, a Chola invader, is held in such high regard.

Yet another invasion from South India ('a great Damila army from the opposite shore') dethroned Lilavati in 1210; its leader, Lokissara, 'brought the whole of Lanka under his sway and reigned, dwelling in Pulatthinagara, [for] nine months'. In turn he was deposed by the general Parakrama, 'the best among men of decision, endowed with great power and courage', who inaugurates Lilavati's final stretch on the throne in 1211. The queen appears to be back in favour with the authors of the Culavamsa, as this time she is described as 'of the dynasty of the Sun and Moon...she who afterward shone in royal splendour'.

This last stretch in power for the queen lasted a mere seven months before she was dethroned by the Pandyan King Parakrama Pandya, who established himself as king in Rajarata in 1212. Following this invasion Lilavati disappears from the historical record. It seems unlikely that Parakrama of Pandya would have put her to death, but his successor, the notoriously tyrannical Magha, may well have at some point after his invasion of 1215.

== Significance ==
Queen Lilavati's life and reigns effectively spanned across the final decline and collapse of Sinhalese power in medieval Sri Lanka. The twenty-six years following her husband's death saw nine separate rulers and at least three invasions from the Kalinga and Pandya lands of South India. These invasions in particular would have been a blow to the pride of Lilavati's dynasty, which prided itself on having driven the Chola out and establishing native rule.

It is difficult also to make sense of the factions at work in Rajarata, Ruhuna, and Dhakkinadesa at the time. Lilavati clearly belonged to the house of Vijayabahu, whilst Nissanka Malla, Vikramabahu, Chodaganga, Queen Kalyanavathi and Dhammasoka appear to represent a separate, Kalingan house. However adding confusion to the situation are invaders like Anikanga (who in some sources is presented as Dhammasoka's father), and the fact that there were divisions even within the clans themselves (such as Vikramabahu II and Chodaganga's fighting with each other).

Parakramabahu I, Nissanka Malla, Vijayabahu II, and Lokissara are explicitly described in the Culavamsa as ruling the entirety of Lanka during this period, but following the invasion by Kalinga Magha and his tyrannical reign from 1215–1236, the island fractured into a series of discrete and competing kingdoms. Sri Lanka would not see geopolitical union again until 1450; It would be under the Kotte Kingdom.

== In Zoology ==
An armored spider of the family Tetrablemmidae, that is endemic to Sri Lanka was named Shearella lilawati.

== See also ==
- List of monarchs of Sri Lanka
- History of Sri Lanka
- Parakramabahu

Queen Lilavati House of Vijayabahu Born: ? ? Died: ? ?
Regnal titles
Preceded by Chodaganga	Queen of Polonnaruwa; 1197–1200	Succeeded by Sahassamalla
Preceded by Anikanga Mahadipada	Queen of Polonnaruwa; 1209–1210	Succeeded by Lokissara
Preceded by Lokissara	Queen of Polonnaruwa; 1211–1212	Succeeded by Parakrama Pandya
