= Chodaganga of Polonnaruwa =

King of Polonnaruwa from 1196 to 1197

Chodaganga
- King of Polonnaruwa
- Reign: 1196-1197
- Predecessor: Vikramabahu II
- Successor: Lilavati
- House: House of Kalinga

Chodaganga was King of Polonnaruwa in the twelfth century, who ruled from 1196 to 1197. He succeeded his uncle Vikramabahu II, whom he usurped as king of Polonnaruwa and ruled for nine months before he was deposed and blinded by the general Senevirat, who installed Lilavati, wife of Parakramabahu I, as the new ruler. Chodaganga was also a nephew of Nissanka Malla.

== See also ==
- List of Sri Lankan monarchs
- History of Sri Lanka

Chodaganga of Polonnaruwa House of Kalinga Born: ? ? Died: ? ?
Regnal titles
Preceded by Vikramabahu II	King of Polonnaruwa; 1196–1197	Succeeded by Lilavati
