= Sahassa Malla =

King of Polonnaruwa from 1200 to 1202

- King of Polonnaruwa
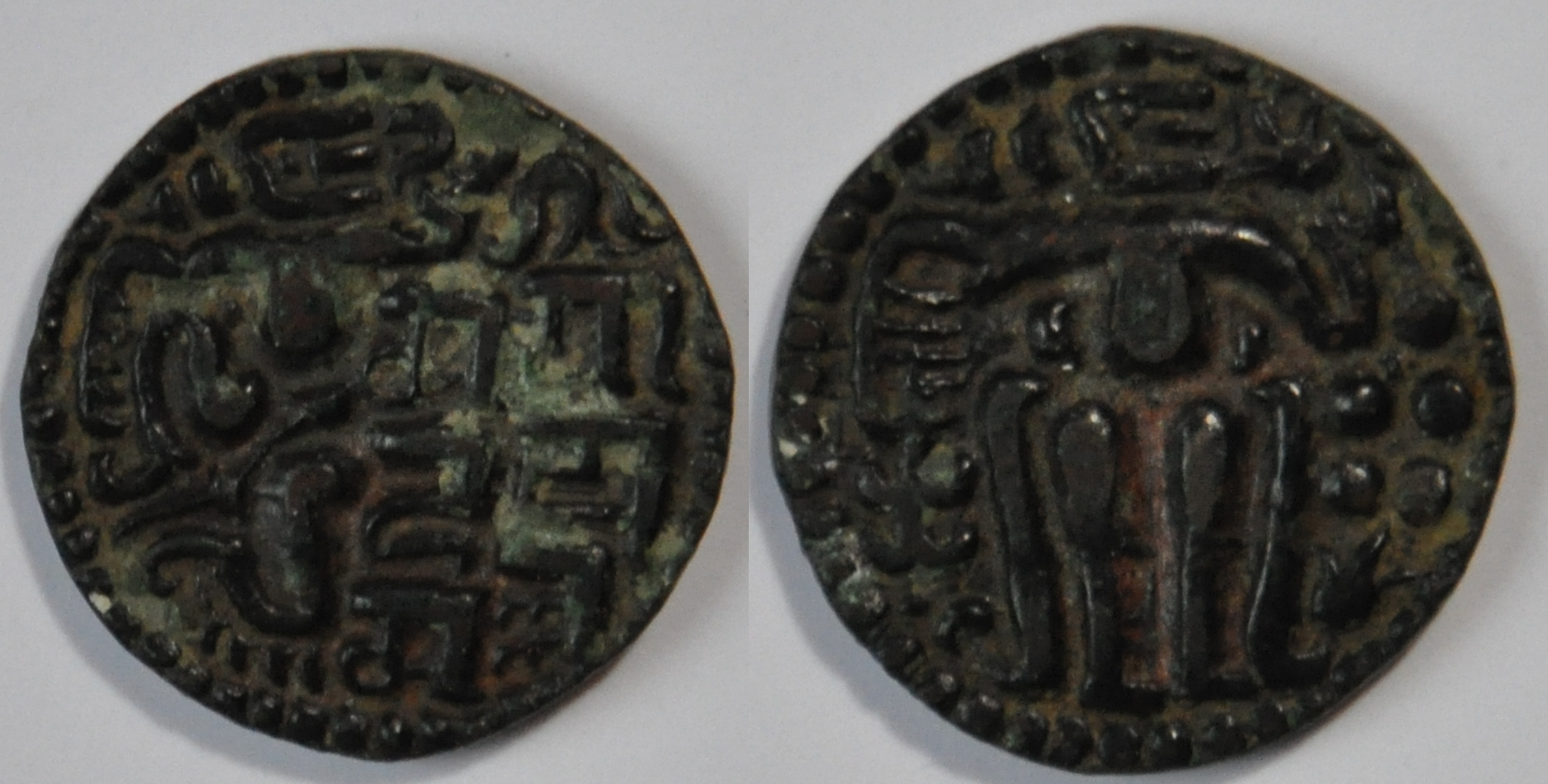
- One massa coin of Sahassa Malla
- Reign: 1200–1202
- Predecessor: Lilavati
- Successor: Kalyanavati
- House: House of Kalinga
- Father: Jayagopa
- Mother: Parvati
- Religion: Theravada Buddhism

Sahassa Malla (also known as "the lion-hearted king") was King of Polonnaruwa in the thirteenth century. He ruled the Kingdom of Polonnaruwa from 1200 to 1202. He succeeded Lilavati, who was removed from the throne by her co-ministers. He was deposed by General Ayasmantha and succeeded by Kalyanavati. He was the younger brother of Nissanka Malla.

== See also ==
- History of Sri Lanka
- List of Sri Lankan monarchs

Sahassa Malla House of Kalinga Born: ? ? Died: ? ?
Regnal titles
Preceded by Lilavati	King of Polonnaruwa; 1200–1202	Succeeded by Kalyanavati
