= Mahinda VI =

King of Polonnaruwa in 1187

Mahinda VI of Sri Lanka
- King of Polonnaruwa
- Reign: 1187
- Predecessor: Vijayabahu II
- Successor: Nissanka Malla
- Died: 1187

Mahinda VI (?–1187) was a king of the Kingdom of Polonnaruwa who came to the throne by killing his predecessor Vijayabahu II. He only reigned for five days, being killed by his successor and Vijayabahu II's sub-king, Nissanka Malla.

During his short reign, he wrote the Madigiriya inscription to show regards to Maharaja Samara of Srivijaya for his deeds to free the Kingdom of Polonnaruwa from the Cholas.

== See also ==
- Mahavamsa
- List of monarchs of Sri Lanka
- History of Sri Lanka
- Madigiriya inscription

Mahinda VI House of Vijayabahu Born: ? ? Died: ? 1187
Regnal titles
Preceded by Vijayabahu II	King of Polonnaruwa; 1187	Succeeded by Nissanka Malla
