= Vikramabahu II =

King of Polonnaruwa in 1196

- King of Polonnaruwa
- Reign: 1196
- Predecessor: Vira Bahu I
- Successor: Chodaganga
- Died: 1196
- House: House of Kalinga
- Father: Jayagopa
- Mother: Parvati

Vikramabahu II (died 1196) was King of Polonnaruwa in the twelfth century, who ruled in 1196, for three months. He succeeded his nephew Vira Bahu I as king of Polonnaruwa and was murdered and succeeded by another nephew Chodaganga, a son of his sister. He was the younger brother of Nissanka Malla.

== See also ==
- List of Sri Lankan monarchs
- History of Sri Lanka

Vikramabahu II House of Kalinga Born: ? ? Died: ? 1196
Regnal titles
Preceded by Vira Bahu I	King of Polonnaruwa; 1196–1196	Succeeded by Chodaganga
