= Shearella =

Scientific classification
- Kingdom: Animalia
- Phylum: Arthropoda
- Subphylum: Chelicerata
- Class: Arachnida
- Order: Araneae
- Infraorder: Araneomorphae
- Family: Tetrablemmidae
- Genus: Shearella; Lehtinen, 1981

Type species
- S. lilawati Lehtinen, 1981

Species
- 4, see text

Genus of spiders

Shearella is a genus of Asian araneomorph spiders in the family Tetrablemmidae that was first described by Pekka T. Lehtinen in 1981.

== Species ==
As of September 2019 it contains four species, found in Asia:

- Shearella alii Sankaran & Sebastian, 2016 – India
- Shearella lilawati Lehtinen, 1981 (type) – Sri Lanka
- Shearella sanya Lin & Li, 2010 – China
- Shearella selvarani Lehtinen, 1981 – Sri Lanka
