= Kalyanavati =

Queen of Polonnaruwa from 1202 to 1208

- Queen of Polonnaruwa
- Reign: 1202-1208
- Predecessor: Sahassa Malla
- Successor: Dharmasoka
- Spouse: Nissanka Malla
- Issue: Vira Bahu I
- House: House of Kalinga
- Religion: Theravada Buddhism

Kalyanavati was Queen of Polonnaruwa from 1202 to 1208. She was one of the few queens that reigned in Sri Lanka. She succeeded Sahassa Malla as Queen of Polonnaruwa and was succeeded by Dharmasoka.

She was the wife of Nissanka Malla. She was widowed in 1196.

In 1202, the chief of the army, Ayasmanta, deposed king Sahassa Malla, and placed the dowager queen Kalyanavati on the throne in his stead. Her reign is described as a peaceful one. Ayasmanta managed the affairs of state in her place, and during these years he founded the Sarajakula-vaddhana college at Weligama, and issued the treatise Dhammadhikarana ("Rules of Practice") concerning the rules of the caste system. Queen Kalyanavati is known to have founded religious monuments, notably the vihara at Pannasalaka.

She was succeeded by the three year old king Dharmasoka. It is unknown how her reign ended, but it is assumed that she was deposed: the reigh of Ayasmanta continued, since he continued as regent during the minority of Dharmasoka.

== See also ==
- List of Sri Lankan monarchs
- History of Sri Lanka

Kalyanavati House of Kalinga Born: ? ? Died: ? ?
Regnal titles
Preceded by Sahassa Malla	Queen of Polonnaruwa; 1202–1208	Succeeded by Dharmasoka
