= Parakrama Pandyan II =

King of Polonnaruwa from 1212 to 1215

- King of Polonnaruwa
- Reign: 1212–1215
- Predecessor: Lilavati
- Successor: Kalinga Magha
- House: Pandyan Dynasty

Parakrama Pandyan II, also Pandu Parakramabahu of Polonnaruwa or Parakrama Pandu, was a Pandyan king who invaded the Kingdom of Polonnaruwa in the thirteenth century and ruled from 1212 to 1215 CE. His namesake royal Parakrama Pandyan I had ruled in Madurai fifty years earlier and had sought help from his contemporary Parakramabahu I of Polonnaruwa when faced with a Pandyan civil war. Parakrama Pandyan II came to the throne deposing Lilavati—ruling monarch, consort and successor of Parakramabahu I—as king of Polonnaruwa. He ruled for three years until Polonnaruwa was invaded and he was taken captive by Kalinga Magha, who succeeded him.

== See also ==
- Pandyan Dynasty
- List of Sri Lankan monarchs
- History of Sri Lanka

Parakrama Pandyan II Pandyan Dynasty Born: ? ? Died: ? ?
Regnal titles
Preceded by Lilavati	King of Polonnaruwa; 1212–1215	Succeeded by Kalinga Magha
