= Shearella selvarani =

Scientific classification
- Kingdom: Animalia
- Phylum: Arthropoda
- Subphylum: Chelicerata
- Class: Arachnida
- Order: Araneae
- Infraorder: Araneomorphae
- Family: Tetrablemmidae
- Genus: Shearella
- Species: S. selvarani

Binomial name
- Shearella selvarani Lehtinen, 1981

Species of spider

Shearella selvarani is a species of spiders of the genus Shearella. It is endemic to Sri Lanka.
