= Polonnaruwa agreement =

Settlement of Dispute between Vijayabahu and Velakkara

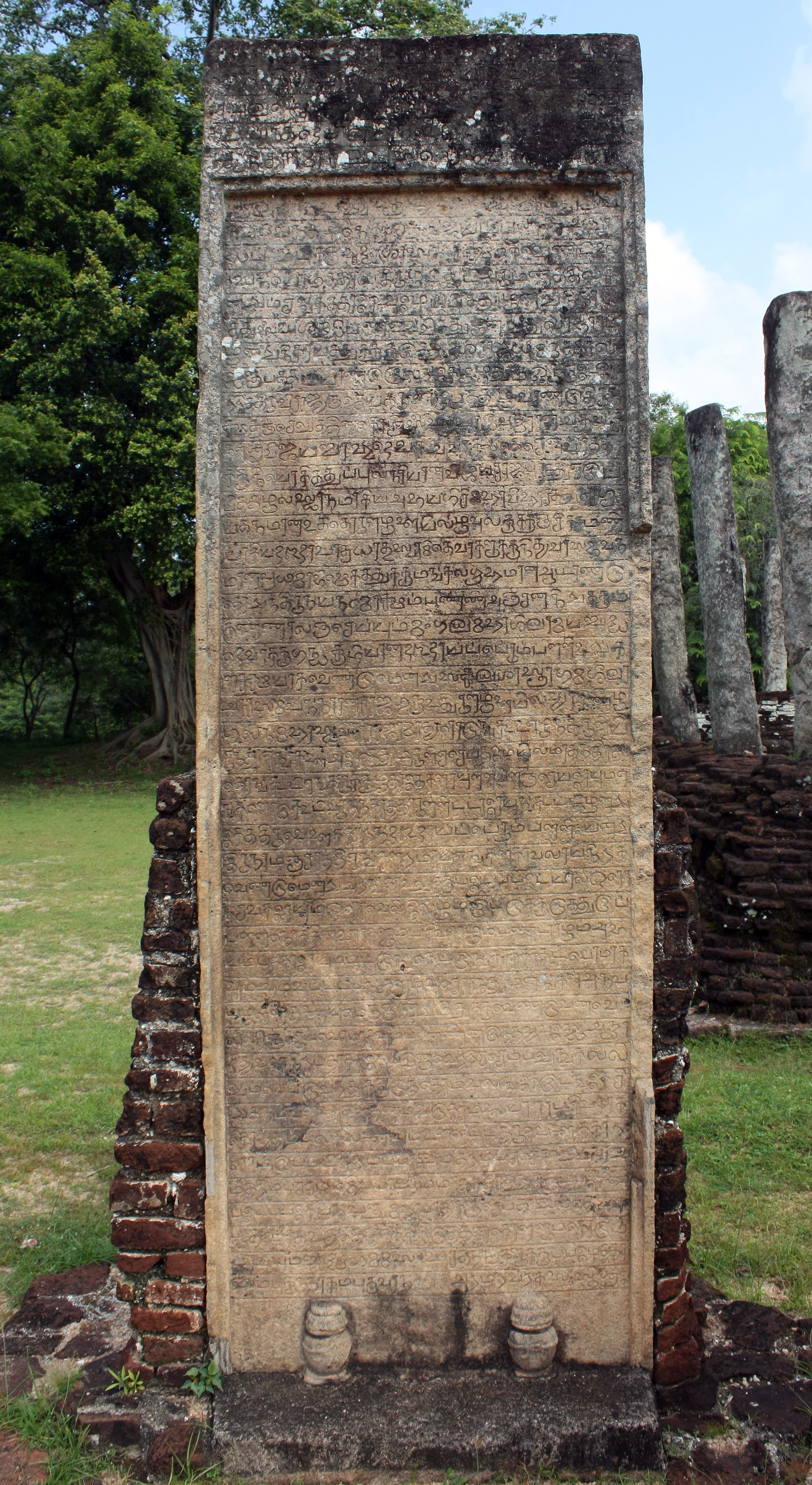
The Polonnaruwa inscription contains the agreement.

The Polonnaruwa agreement was part of the settlement of a dispute between Vijayabahu I and Velakkara mercenaries of Polonnaruwa kingdom, made after a 1084 revolt had been defeated.

The agreement is contained in what is popularly known as the Polonnaruwa inscription. The Velakkara mercenaries revolted in 1084, unwilling to fight their Tamil kinsmen after the declaration of war by the Chola Empire under Kulothunga Chola I. They mutinied and burnt the palace in the Velakkara Revolt causing Vijayabahu I to flee to Vatagiri. On his return, he defeated the insurrection and caused the ringleaders of the revolt to be burnt in the funeral pyres of the Generals they had killed. estimated 1000 - 2000 mercenaries were killed or executed under the orders of vijayabahu I.

Vijayabahu then made an agreement to the effect that the Velakkara mercenaries would protect the Temple of the Tooth.
