= Sugala Devi =

Queen regnant of Ruhuna
- Reign: ?-1158
- Predecessor: Manabharana II
- Successor: Parakramabahu I
- Born: 12th century A.D
- Burial: Meewathpura
- Spouse: Sri Vallabha of Ruhuna
- Issue: Manabharana II; Lilavati of Polonnaruwa
- House: House of Vijaya
- Dynasty: Shakya
- Father: Nandaniya Weerawamha of Merukkanda
- Mother: Yasodhara

Queen Sugala of Ruhuna also referred to as Sugala Devi (12th century A.D), was the last monarch of the Kingdom of Ruhuna, a state which was located in the Southern and Eastern regions of Sri Lanka.

== Life ==
The Kingdom of Ruhuna was a Sub kingdom loyal to the King of Anuradhapura.

She was the first ruling queen of the Kingdom of Ruhuna. She was claimed to have taken the throne of the Ruhuna, while King Parakramabahu I ruled entire island from Polonnaruwa. Hence, Queen Sugala was not the sole ruler of the country: she is not considered as a Sinhalese monarch, since King Parakramabahu I reigned over large parts of the Sri Lanka.

She was the mother of King Manabharana. Her son was defeated by Parakramabahu in a battle for possession of the Pihiti Rata (Northerner kingdom of Sri Lanka). Many King Manabharana followers united behind Queen Sugala to defend Ruhuna from King Parakramabahu's invading army, before the revolt was put down brutally in 1160.

== See also ==
- List of Ruhuna monarchs
- History of Sri Lanka
