= Shearella lilawati =

Scientific classification
- Kingdom: Animalia
- Phylum: Arthropoda
- Subphylum: Chelicerata
- Class: Arachnida
- Order: Araneae
- Infraorder: Araneomorphae
- Family: Tetrablemmidae
- Genus: Shearella
- Species: S. lilawati

Binomial name
- Shearella lilawati Lehtinen, 1981

Species of spider

Shearella lilawati is a species of spider of the genus Shearella. It is endemic to Sri Lanka. The specific name refers to Queen Lilavati, who reigned intermittently between 1197 and 1212 in Polonnaruwa, Sri Lanka.
