= Anikanga =

King of Polonnaruwa in 1209

- King of Polonnaruwa
- Reign: 1209-1209
- Predecessor: Dharmasoka
- Successor: Lilavati
- Issue: Dharmasoka
- House: House of Kalinga
- Dynasty: Chola

Anikanga (Sinhala: අනිකංග) was King of Polonnaruwa in the thirteenth century, who ruled from 1209 to 1209. He succeeded his son Dharmasoka, who was installed as king of Polonnaruwa, and was succeeded by Queen Lilavati. He reigned for 17 days. He allied with the Cholas and invaded Polonnaruwa to capture the throne.

== Background and invasion ==
The military of the kingdom of Polonnaruwa captured the throne and issued Dharmasoka, an infant to the throne. Meanwhile, Anikanga started organizing a force within the Chola country. This army then invaded Polonnaruwa and slaughtered Dharmasoka, the heir apparent and Ayasmanta, who led the army of Polonnaruwa.

=== Aftermath ===
Anikanga ruled for a brief period of time, 17 days. The army of Polonnaruwa this time issued Lilawati to the throne. Lilawati only ruled for a very brief period until getting overthrown again.

== See also ==
- List of Sri Lankan monarchs
- History of Sri Lanka

Anikanga House of Kalinga Born: ? ? Died: ? ?
Regnal titles
Preceded by Dharmasoka	King of Polonnaruwa; 1209–1209	Succeeded by Lilavati
