= Lokissara =

King of Polonnaruwa from 1210 to 1211

- King of Polonnaruwa
- Reign: 1210-1211
- Predecessor: Lilavati
- Successor: Lilavati

Lokissara was a Damila soldier who was enlisted with an army abroad and defeated the Royal Polonnaruwa Army deposing Lilavati. Lokissara ruled for nine months from 1210 to 1211 before the Royal Army restored Lilavati for the third time.

== See also ==
- List of Sri Lankan monarchs
- History of Sri Lanka

Lokissara Born: ? ? Died: ? ?
Regnal titles
Preceded by Lilavati	King of Polonnaruwa; 1210–1211	Succeeded by Lilavati
