= Dharmasoka =

King of Polonnaruwa from 1208 to 1209

Dharmashoka
- King of Polonnaruwa
- Reign: 1208–1209
- Predecessor: Kalyanavati
- Successor: Anikanga
- House: House of Kalinga
- Father: Anikanga

Dharmashoka (Sinhala: ධර්මාශෝක) was an infant King of Polonnaruwa in the thirteenth century, who ruled from 1208 to 1209. He was three months old and installed as king by General Ayasmantha succeeding Kalyanavati as king of Polonnaruwa and was succeeded by his father Anikanga.

== See also ==
- List of Sri Lankan monarchs
- History of Sri Lanka

Dharmasoka House of Kalinga Born: ? ? Died: ? ?
Regnal titles
Preceded by Kalyanavati	King of Polonnaruwa; 1208–1209	Succeeded by Anikanga
