= Nissanka Latha Mandapaya =

Structure in Polonnaruwa, Sri Lanka

Coordinates: 7°56′51.13″N 81°0′4.11″E

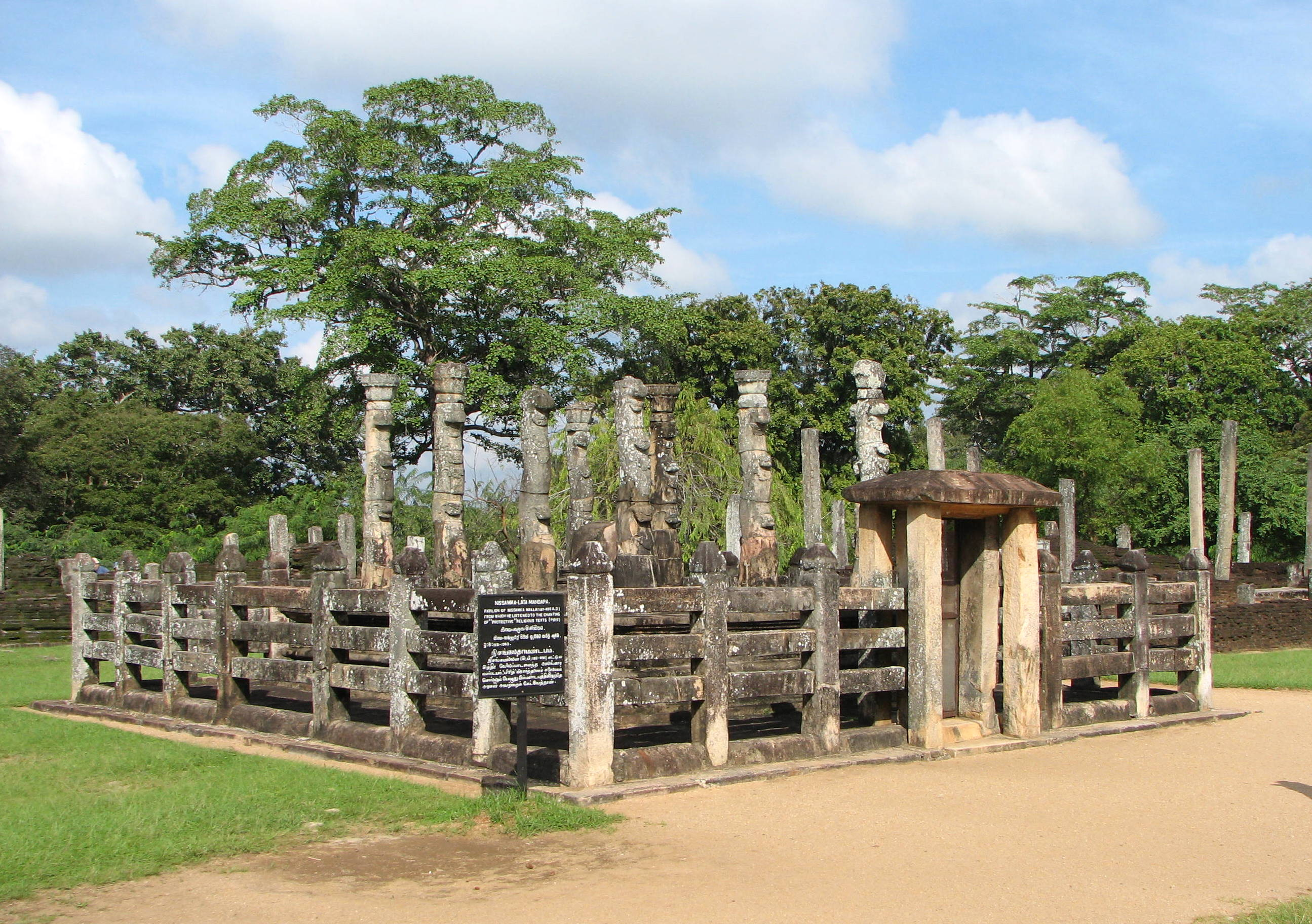
Nissanka Latha Mandapaya

Nissanka Latha Mandapaya (Sinhala: නිශ්ශංක ලතා මණ්ඩපය) is a unique structure in the ancient city of Polonnaruwa in Sri Lanka. A màndapa is a pillared structure that is open on all sides and protects the person(s) inside from the sun with a roof. By definition, as of the 20th century, mándapas, as temporary structures, are built inside a house or a building and serve as recitation platform during remembrance ceremonies for the dead.

Built by King Nissanka Malla (1187–1196) and named after him, it is located near the western entrance of the Dalada Maluva, the area that contains the oldest and most sacred monuments in the city. A nearby stone inscription identifies this as the building used by Nissanka Malla to listen to pirith (chanting of Buddhist scriptures).

The structure is an elevated stone platform with a number of stone columns and surrounded by a low stone wall. These stone columns are the unique feature about the Nissanka Latha Mandapaya, since they are carved in a manner that is found nowhere else in the country. The eight granite columns are arranged in two rows, with four in each row. Presumably used to support a roof, each of them is approximately 8 feet 4 inches (2.54 m) in height. In each of these columns, the crown is carved in the shape of a blossoming lotus bud. The rest of the column is elaborately carved to resemble the stem of the flower. Unlike stone columns commonly seen in the architecture of this period, these are not straight, but are curved in three places. According to archaeologist Senarath Paranavithana, the stone columns at the Nissanka Latha Mandapaya are the best examples of this feature of ancient Sri Lankan architecture.

At the center of the platform, flanked by the stone columns, appears a small stupa. This is also made from stone, but the top part of it has been destroyed. Its base is decorated with a carved design. The platform is surrounded by a stone railing. The structure is entered through a single stone doorway. In contrast to the elaborately carved stone pillars, these have an undecorated and plain finish.
