= Polonnaruwa National Cricket Ground =

Cricket stadium in Sri Lanka

Ground information
- Location: Hingurakgoda, Polonnaruwa District, North Central Province, Sri Lanka
- Establishment: 6 April 2021
- Tenants: (Sri Lanka national cricket team Inter-Provincial Limited Over Tournament; Inter-Provincial Twenty20)

International information

Polonnaruwa National Cricket Ground also known as either Polonnaruwa Cricket Ground or National Cricket Ground, Hingurakgoda is a cricket stadium in Hingurakgoda, Polonaruwa District, Sri Lanka. The ground was inaugurated on 6 April 2021 with incurring a cost of Rs. 130 million. The stadium is built as part of a large sports complex in the region.

The ground has been built on a 42/43 acre land which has boundary distance of 80 metres and set with 10 centre wickets. The ground was initiated as part of Sri Lanka Cricket's National Pathway Project which was commenced in 2016. The project was announced in the latter part of 2016. Then CEO of SLC Mohan de Silva revealed that SLC had allocated Rs. 100 million each for cricket stadiums to be built in Pollonaruwa and Jaffna. However, the construction of the stadium was delayed for several years due to the financial tussles and also due to the creative differences with the SLC interim committee. The tenders for establishing the ground was awarded in 2018. The construction of the ground finally took off in February 2019.

In May 2020, it was revealed that the opening ceremony of the ground had to be further delayed for months due to the outbreak of COVID-19 pandemic.

The initial estimated cost of the project was Rs. 130 million and the ground was partially completed in May 2020 with cost of Rs. 92 million.

In April 2021, COPE committee which summoned Sri Lanka Cricket for investigations also revealed that the SLC failed to seek approval from the Department of Archaeology in order to construct the sports complex and cricket stadium with spectators in Polonnaruwa.
