= Vijayabahu II =

King of Polonnaruwa from 1186 to 1187

- King of Polonnaruwa
- Predecessor: Parakramabahu I
- Successor: Mahinda VI
- Died: 1187
- House: House of Vijayabahu
- Dynasty: Maurya
- Mother: Mitta

Vijayabahu II (1186–1187) was king of the Kingdom of Polonnaruwa, in what is now Sri Lanka. He was the nephew of his predecessor, Parakramabahu I.

He was killed by Mahinda VI, who took the throne, and who in turn was killed - within a week - by Vijayabahu's sub-king Nissanka Malla.

== See also ==
- Mahavamsa
- List of monarchs of Sri Lanka
- History of Sri Lanka

Vijayabahu II House of Vijayabahu Born: ? ? Died: ? 1187
Regnal titles
Preceded by Parakramabahu I	King of Polonnaruwa; 1186–1187	Succeeded by Mahinda VI
