= Vira Bahu I =

King of Polonnaruwa in 1196

- King of Polonnaruwa
- Reign: 1196
- Predecessor: Nissanka Malla
- Successor: Vikramabahu II
- Born: 1179
- Died: 1196 (aged 16–17)
- House: House of Kalinga
- Father: Nissanka Malla

Vira Bahu I (1196) was son of Nissanka Malla and king of the Kingdom of Polonnaruwa, in present-day Sri Lanka. He came to the throne after his father's death, however only managed to reign for less than a day, being crowned at night and slain at dawn by the commander-in-chief of the army, Tavuru Senevirat on the grounds that he was a son not equal to his father.

== See also ==
- Mahavamsa
- List of monarchs of Sri Lanka
- History of Sri Lanka

Vira Bahu I House of Kalinga Born: ? ? Died: ? 1196
Regnal titles
Preceded by Nissanka Malla	King of Polonnaruwa; 1196	Succeeded by Vikramabahu II
