= Nissanka Malla =

King of Polonnaruwa from 1187 to 1196

Nissanka Malla නිශ්ශංක මල්ල
- Śrī Saṅga Bo; Apratimalla; Chakravarthin; Kalinga Lankesvara
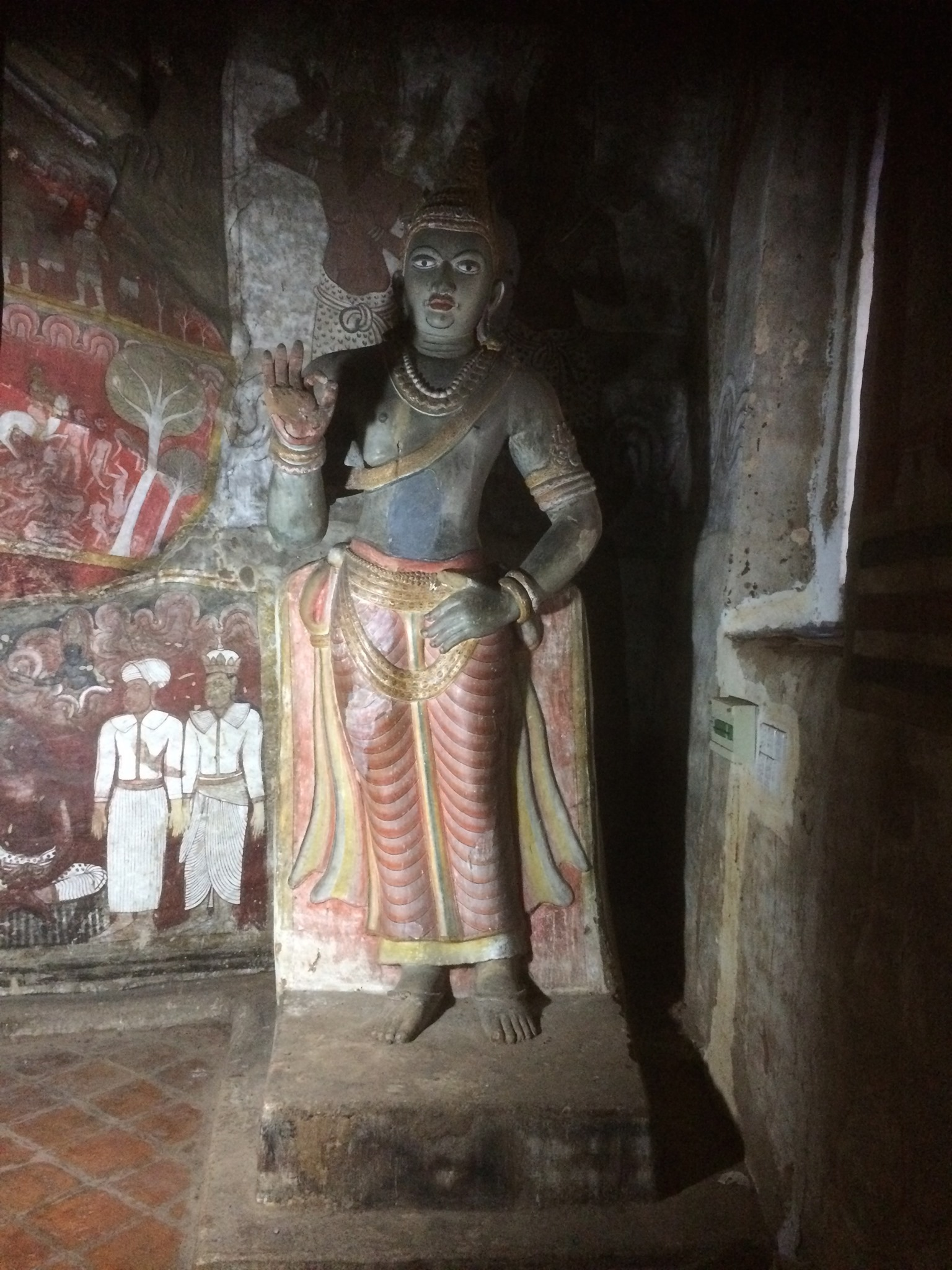
- Statue of Nissanka Malla in the Dambulla cave temple

King of Polonnaruwa
- Reign: 1187–1196
- Predecessor: Mahinda VI
- Successor: Vira Bahu I
- Born: 1157 or 1158; Kalinga
- Died: 1196 (aged 38–39)
- Consort: Kalinga Subadradevi; Gangavamsa Kalyanamahadevi
- Wife: Kalyanavati
- Issue: Vira Bahu I
Names
- Vīrarāja Nissanka Malla; Kalinga Nissanka Malla
- Dynasty: House of Kalinga
- Father: Jayagopa
- Mother: Parvati
- Religion: Theravada Buddhism

Nissanka Malla (Sinhala: නිශ්ශංක මල්ල), also known as Kirti Nissanka and Kalinga Lokaswara, was a king of Polonnaruwa (Sri Lanka) who ruled the country from 1187 to 1196. He is known for his architectural constructions such as the Nissanka Lata Mandapaya, Hatadage and Rankot Vihara, as well as for the refurbishment of old temples and irrigation tanks.

Nissanka Malla declared that only a Buddhist had the right to rule the country, thereby securing his position and justifying his claim for kingship. He spent large sums for various constructions and refurbishments, and also gave money to the public in an attempt to put down crimes. He maintained cordial relationships with several countries, and also invaded the states of the Pandyan and Chola dynasties in South India but the invasion failed.

== Ancestry and family ==
A rock inscription made by Nissanka Malla at Dambulla mentions that he is of the Kalinga dynasty and a descendant from the race of Prince Vijaya. Another inscription at Ruwanwelisaya describes him as being a member of a royal family of Kalinga, born at Sinhapura. The inscription there reads;

...having come from the royal line of the Ikshvaku family having become like a forehead mark to the royal family of Kalinga emperors born at Sinhapura...

Nissanka Malla's year of birth is 1157 or 1158. He was the son of Queen Parvati and King Jayagopa. This is mentioned in a rock inscription made by Nissanka Malla at Galpota. This inscription describes Jayagopa as being the reigning king of Sinhapura. Nissanka Malla had two wives named Kalinga Subadradevi and Gangavamsa Kalyanamahadevi. He was also a son-in-law or nephew of Parākramabāhu I.

=== Location of Sinhapura ===
According to Indian historians (as of September 2022) the names of Nissanka Malla's parents, Jayagopa and Parvati Devi, are not mentioned in Indian history. Some scholars have proposed Sumatra and Jaffna Peninsula as the location of Kalinga and Sinhapura.

== Reign ==
Nissanka Malla came to Polonnaruwa under the invitation of Vijayabâhu II, who succeeded Parākramabāhu the Great, and was appointed as Vijayabâhu's Aepa (ඈපා/ duke/ sub-king). Vijayabâhu was killed by Mahinda VI of the Kalinga Dynasty. Mahinda VI reigned for only five days before Nissanka Malla killed him and assumed the throne himself in 1187.

By claiming to be descended from Vijaya, the first king of Lanka, Nissanka Malla justified his right to the throne. He secured his position further by declaring that the ruler of Sri Lanka should adhere to Buddhism. His rock inscription at Galpotha describes this, saying that "non-Buddhists should not be placed in power in Sri Lanka to which the Kalinga dynasty was the rightful heir".

He is also known as Kirti Nissanka and is referred to in some records as Kalinga Lankesvara. His rock inscriptions refer to him in names such as "Fountain of renown", "Protector of the Earth" and "Lamp by which the whole world was illuminated".

=== Economy ===
Heavy taxes that were imposed by Parākramabāhu I were largely reduced by Nissanka Malla. He gave money, gold, cattle, land and other items of value to the public. This was seen by him as an act to "put down robbery", since he believed that they resorted to robbery because of oppression and severe taxation. However, Nissanka Malla tried to outdo the accomplishments of Parākramabāhu I with his constructions, which later led the kingdom becoming almost bankrupt.

=== Foreign relations ===
Nissanka Malla recovered cordial relationships with Ramanna; following the end of Polonnaru-Pagan war. He also maintained relationships with countries such as the Khmer Empire. He sent missionaries to Cambodia and was responsible for conversion of Cambodia into Theravada which lasted until. Pali language scripts that are found in Southeast Asia are likely from the missionaries he sent.

=== Territory ===
Rameswaram of South India, which had come under the control of Sri Lanka and Vira Pandya dynasty during the reign of Parākramabāhu I, in the end of the Pandyan Civil War it come under Cholas. However Nissanka Malla invaded the Rameswaram and renovated a temple in Rameswaram and renamed it Nissankesvara. Nissanka Malla also invaded the states of the Pandyans and Cholas but the invasion failed. Despite his exaggerated claims in inscription, his efforts were unsuccessful.

== Constructions ==
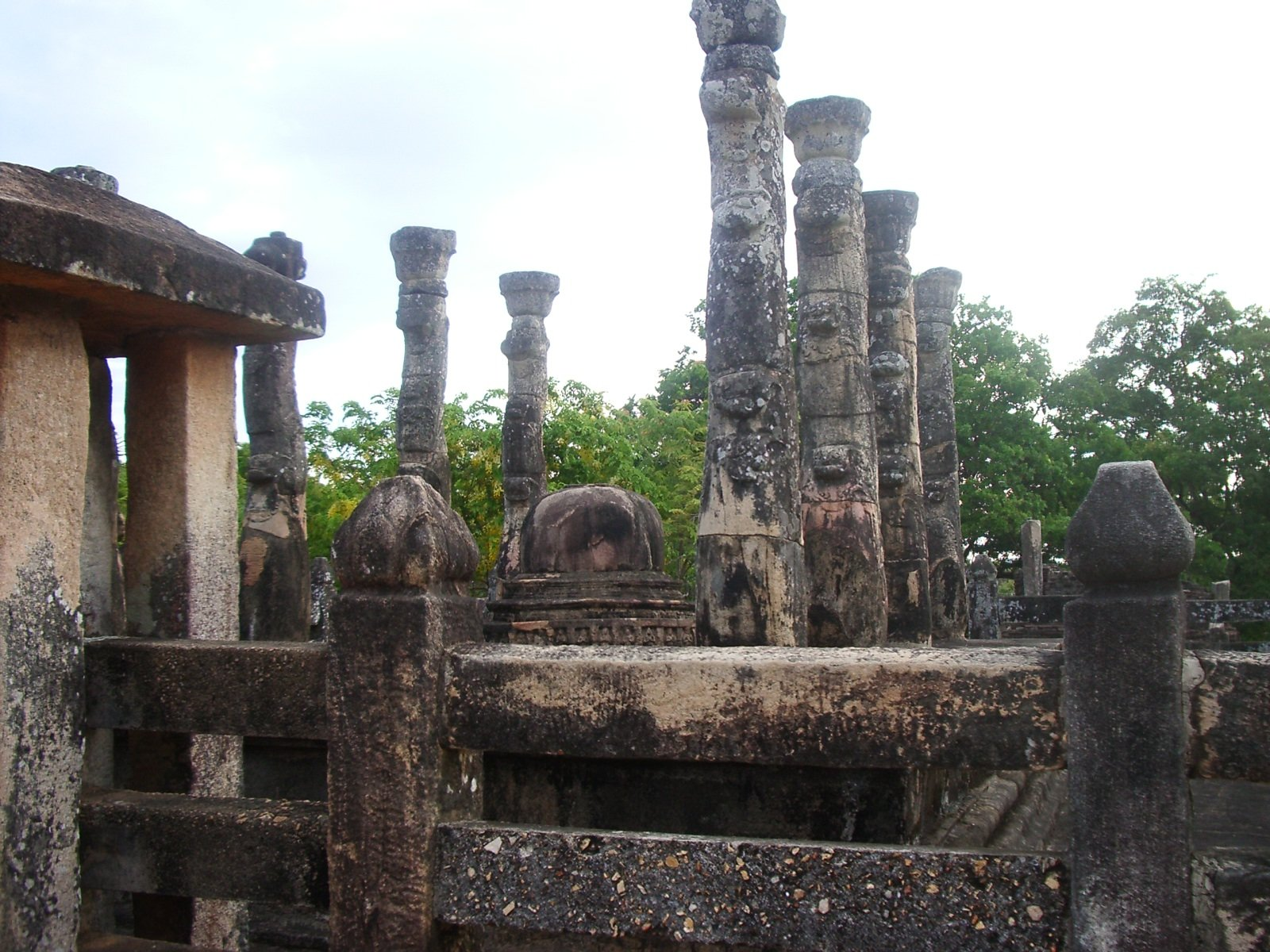
The Nissanka Lata Mandapaya built by King Nissanka Malla

The Nissanka Latha Mandapaya, constructed by Nissanka Malla is a unique type of building. It contains 8 granite pillars which were used to support a roof. The pillars are carved out of granite in the form of lotus stems with opening lotus buds on the tops, and are positioned on a platform.

The Hatadage is another construction done by Nissanka Malla. This building was constructed to keep the Relic of the tooth of the Buddha. The Rankot Vihara, the fourth largest stupa in Sri Lanka, was also constructed by Nissanka Malla.

A major refurbishment was carried out at the Dambulla cave temple by Nissanka Malla. A rock inscription records that he has spent 7 lakhs for this. However, another of his own rock inscriptions contradict this statement and mentions the sum as 1 lakh. The interior of the temple was gilded during the refurbishment. This later earned the temple the name Swarnagiri, meaning golden rock. Nissanka Malla also had 50 Buddha statues in the temple gilded, and had this recorded in a rock inscription near the entrance of the temple. A statue of Nissanka Malla was also made in one of the caves.

== See also ==
- Mahavamsa
- List of monarchs of Sri Lanka
- History of Sri Lanka

Nissanka Malla House of Kalinga Born: ? 1157 or 1158 Died: ? 1196
Regnal titles
Preceded by Mahinda VI	King of Polonnaruwa; 1187–1196	Succeeded by Vira Bahu I
