= Kingdom of Polonnaruwa =

Sinhalese kingdom in present-day Sri Lanka (1055–1232)

Kingdom of Polonnaruwa පොළොන්නරුව රාජධානිය Polonnaruwa Rājādhaniya
- 1055–1232
- Kingdom of Polonnaruwa before 1153 Principality of Maya Rata Principality of Ruhuna
- Capital: Vijayarajapura
- Common languages: Sinhala
- Religion: Theravada Buddhism
- Demonyms: Sinhala: පොළොන්නරු, romanized: Poḷonnaru
- Government: Monarchy
- King
  - 1055-1111: Vijayabahu I
  - 1153-1186: Parakramabahu I
  - 1187-1196: Nissanka Malla
  - 1215-1232: Kalinga Magha
- Historical era: Polonnaruwa period
  - Established: 1055
  - Disestablished: 1232
- Currency: Coins
Preceded by
Chola Empire
Principality of Ruhuna
Succeeded by
Kingdom of Dambadeniya
Jaffna Kingdom
Vanni chieftaincies
- Today part of: Sri Lanka

The Kingdom of Polonnaruwa (Note: Pulatthinagara as mentioned in the Culawamsa) (Sinhala: පොළොන්නරුව රාජධානිය, romanized: Polonnaruwa Rājādhaniya) was the Sinhalese kingdom that expanded across the island of Sri Lanka from 1070 until 1232. The kingdom unified the island and started expanding its overseas influence during the reign of Parakramabahu the Great.

It had an influence in Pandya Nadu since its involvement in a civil war in the Pandya country. During this war, Pandya Nadu was seized as a country administered by the military of Polonnaruwa and Vira Pandyan of Pandya Dynasty. The tributaries of the Chola Empire such as Tondi and Pasi came under its and Vira Pandya military rule. Rameshwaram was under Sinhalese and Vira Pandyan Alliance rule till 1182. Its currency Kahapana was struck in these places. During their influence on Pandya Nadu, construction work was undertaken. But Soon after their initial victory, Vira Pandyan army and Polonnaruwa army were defeated by Cholas and lost the control of Pandya Nadu, Tondi, pasi and Rameswaram. According to the Chola record at Tirukkollambudur of the fourth year of Kulottunga III (A.D. 1182) "the Singhalese soldiers had their noses cut off and rushed into the sea. Vira Pandya himself was compelled to retreat. The town of Madura was captured and made over to Vikrama Pandya." The war thus ended in favour of the Cholas, sometime in the 1170s.

Despite the prosperity endured under kings such as Parakramabahu I, territorial and political instability would repeatedly occur, as the royal court was embroiled with factionalism chiefly between the Pandya and Kalinga bloodlines of the Polonnaruwa kings. This gave the royal military the opportunity to back their own preferred claimants to power, and generals like Ayasmanta and Lokissara would repeatedly seize the throne and install puppet rulers. Queen Lilavati's tumultuous reigns are a notable example for this, having come to power thrice under various generals. This escalating power struggle put the kingdom under decline, as evident from repeated intervention and raids by the Pandyans and Cholas to the North.

In 1212, the capital was seized by Parakrama Pandyan, a rival claimant who took power via Pandyan assistance. Only three years later, Kalinga Magha, whose title evidently traces his bloodline to that of the Eastern Ganga dynasty of Odisha, invaded the kingdom with the help of his soldiers and mercenaries from the Kalinga, modern Kerala and Damila (Tamil Nadu) regions in India, capturing the previous ruler. After the conquest of Polonnaruwa Kingdom, he moved the capital to the Jaffna peninsula which was more secured by heavy Vanni forest and ruled as a tribute-paying subordinate of the Chola Empire of Tanjavur, in modern Tamil Nadu, India. As described in the Mahavamsa, Polonnaruwa was sacked and its population massacred, and the widespread devastation the region prompted a massive migration into the South, ending the 1500-year long civilization of the Rajarata basin.

Following the capture of the royal capital by Magha, opposition coalesced around various warlords and nobles of the previous kingdom, who established fortresses in numerous locations to fight back enemies from the North. This would eventually give rise to Vijayabahu III, the ruler of the fortress of Dambadeniya, who eventually centralized Maya Rata by subjugating the power of rival lords and Magha's influence and established the Kingdom of Dambadeniya in 1232, marking the beginning of the transitional period in Sri Lankan history.

== History ==
=== Chola conquest (993–1070) ===
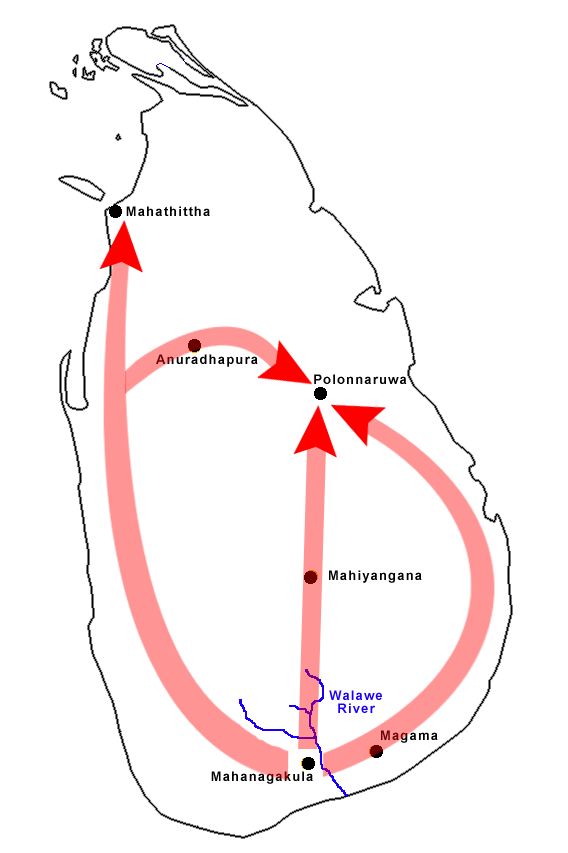
Vijayabāhu I sent three armies to attack Polonnaruwa. One was sent along the western shore to Mahatittha and Polonnaruwa, another from the east across Magama and the third and main force across Mahiyangana.

A partial consolidation of Chola power in Rajarata had succeeded the initial season of plunder. With the intention to transform Chola encampments into more permanent military enclaves, Saivite temples were constructed in Polonnaruwa and in the emporium of Mahatittha. Taxation was also instituted, especially on merchants and artisans by the Cholas. In 1014 Rajaraja I died and was succeeded by his son Rajendra Chola I, perhaps the most aggressive king of his line. Chola raids were launched southward from Rajarata into Rohana. By his fifth year, Rajendra claimed to have completely conquered the island. Thus, the whole of Anuradhapura including the south-eastern province of Rohana were incorporated into the Chola Empire. As per the Sinhalese chronicle Mahavamsa, the conquest of Anuradhapura was completed in the 36th year of the reign of the Sinhalese monarch Mahinda V (c. 1017–18). But the Cholas never really consolidated their control over Southern Sri Lanka. Thus, under Rajendra, Chola predatory expansion in Sri Lanka began to reach a point of diminishing returns. According to the Culavamsa and Karandai Plates, Rajendra Chola led a large army into Anuradhapura and captured Mahinda V's crown, queen, daughter, vast amount of wealth and the king himself whom he took as a prisoner to India, where he eventually died in exile in 1029. After the death of Mahinda V, the Sinhalese monarchy continued to rule from Rohana until the Sinhalese kingdom was re-established in the north by Vijayabāhu I. Mahinda V was succeeded by his son Kassapa VI (1029–1040).

=== Polonnaruwa period (1055–1232) ===
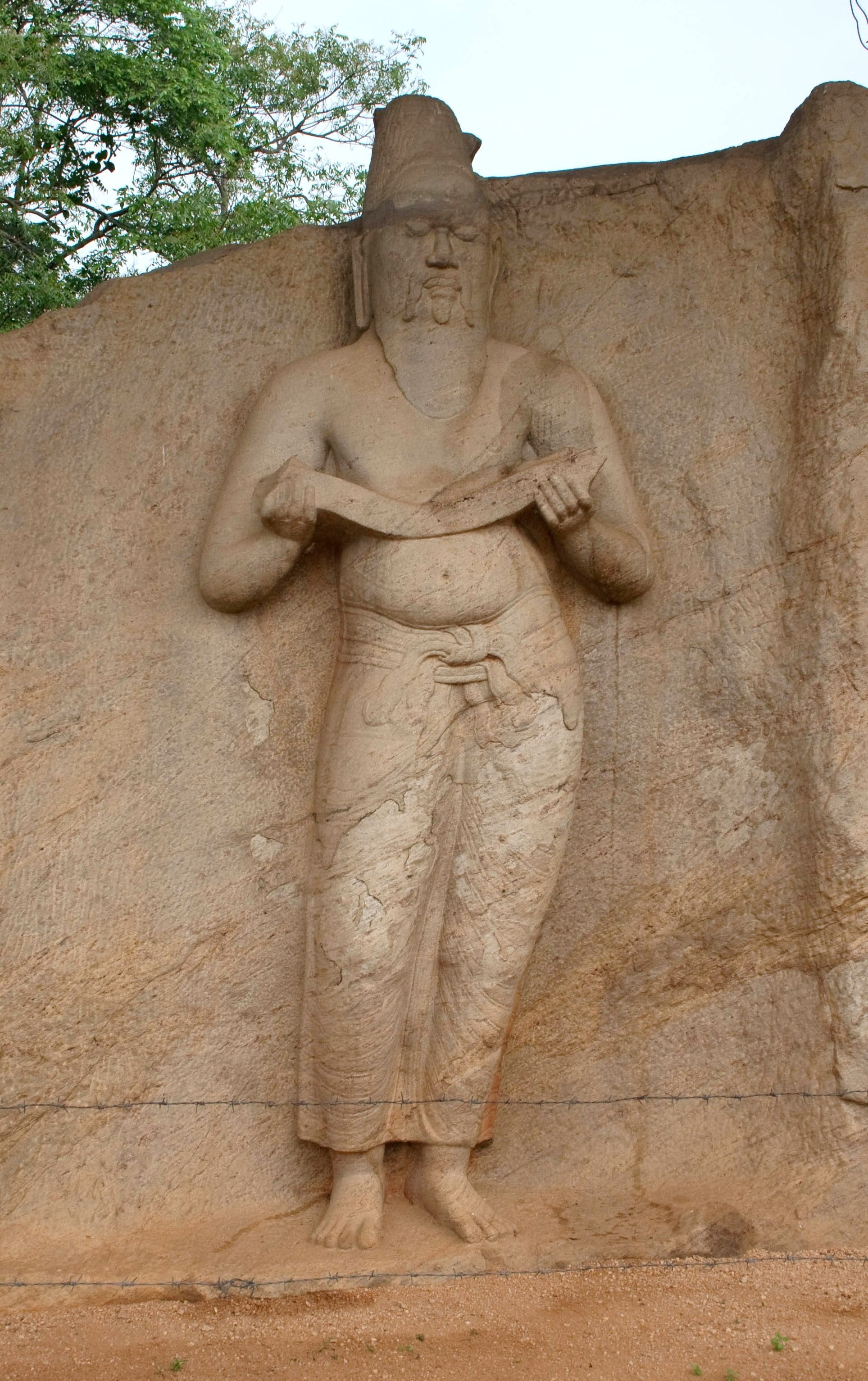
The statue traditionally ascribed to King Parākramabāhu the Great

Following a long war of liberation, Vijayabāhu I successfully expelled the Cholas out of Sri Lanka as their resolve began to diminish. Vijayabāhu I possessed strategic advantages, even without a unified "national" force behind him. A prolonged war of attrition was of greater benefit to the Sinhalese than to the Cholas. After the accession of Virarajendra Chola (1063–1069) to the Chola throne, the Cholas were increasingly on the defensive, not only in Sri Lanka, but also in peninsular India, where they were hard-pressed by the attacks of the Chalukyas from the Deccan. Vijayabāhu I launched a successful two-pronged attack upon Anuradhapura and Polonnaruwa, when he could finally establish a firm base in Southern Sri Lanka. Anuradhapura quickly fell and Polonnaruwa was captured after a prolonged siege of the isolated Chola forces. Virarajendra Chola was forced to dispatch an expedition from the mainland to recapture the settlements in the north and carry the attack back into Rohana, in order to stave off total defeat. What had begun as a profitable incursion and occupation was now deteriorating into desperate attempts to retain a foothold in the North. After a further series of indecisive clashes the occupation finally ended in the withdrawal of the Cholas. By 1070, when Sinhalese sovereignty was restored under Vijayabāhu I, he had reunited the country for the first time in over a century.

Vijayabāhu I (1055–1110), descended from, or at least claimed to be descended from the House of Lambakanna II. He crowned himself in 1055 at Anuradhapura but continued to have his capital at Polonnaruwa as it was more central and made the task of controlling the turbulent province of Rohana much easier. Aside from leading the prolonged resistance to Chola rule, Vijayabāhu I proved to be outstanding in administration and economic regeneration after the war and embarked on the rehabilitation of the island's irrigation network and the resuscitation of Buddhism in the country. Buddhism had suffered severely in the country during the Chola rule, where precedence was given to Saivite Hinduism. The influence of Hinduism on religion and society during this period also saw a hardening of caste attitudes in the Kingdom of Polonnaruwa. Economic, social structure, art and architecture of the Kingdom of Polonnaruwa was a continuation and development of that of the Anuradhapura period. Internal and external trade made the kingdom more prosperous than just relying on its primarily agricultural economy. Seafaring crafts were built in Sri Lanka and were known to have sailed as far as China, some may have even been used as troop transport ships to Burma. However those used in external trade were mostly of foreign construction. The island's importance as an important centre of international trade attracted many foreign merchants, the most prominent of which were descendants of Arab traders. The south of India also hosted settlements of these Arab merchants, and they would become a dominant influence on the country's external trade, but it was by no means a monopoly.

Polonnaruwa period (1017–1232)

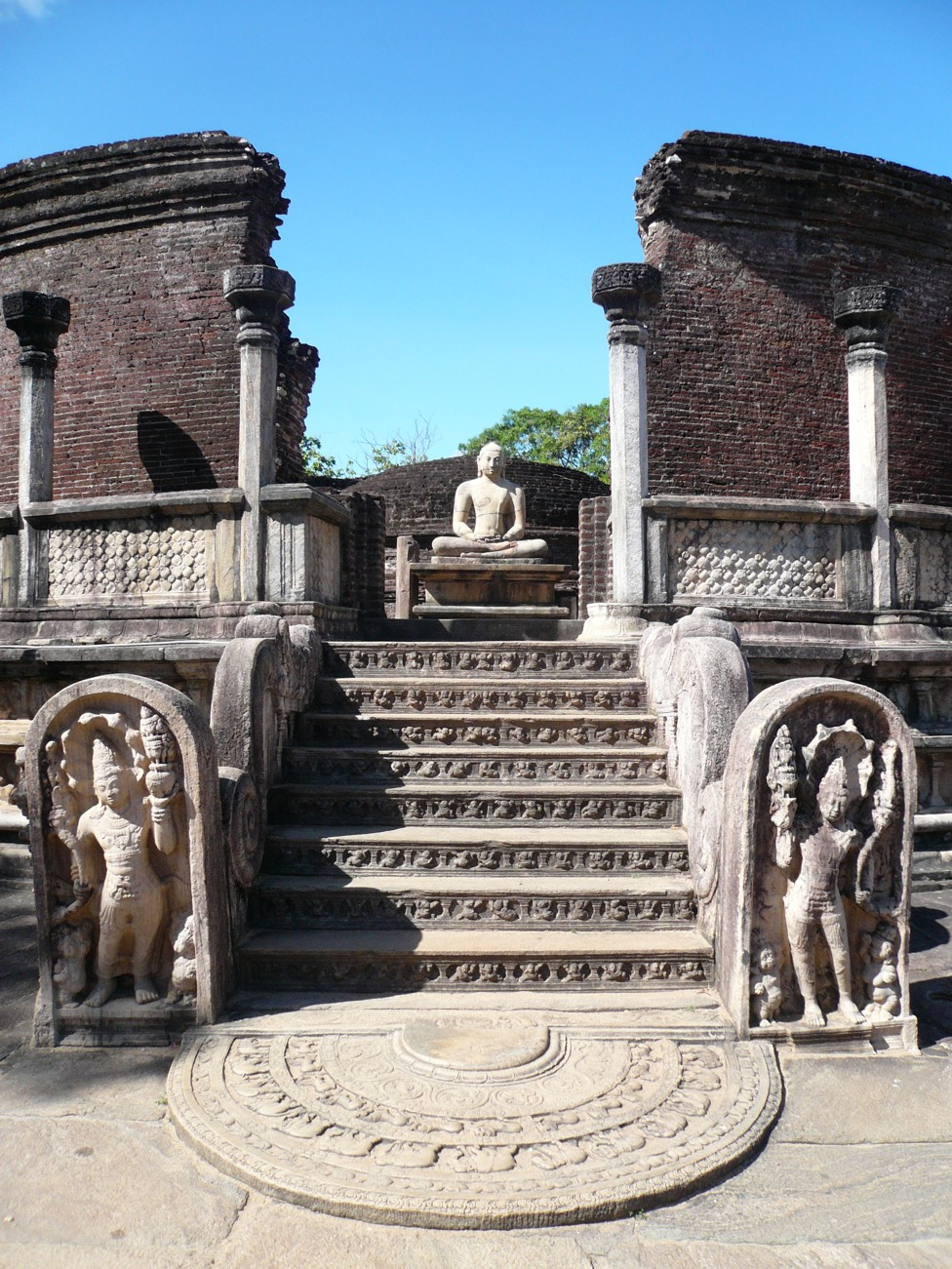
Polonnaruwa Vatadage

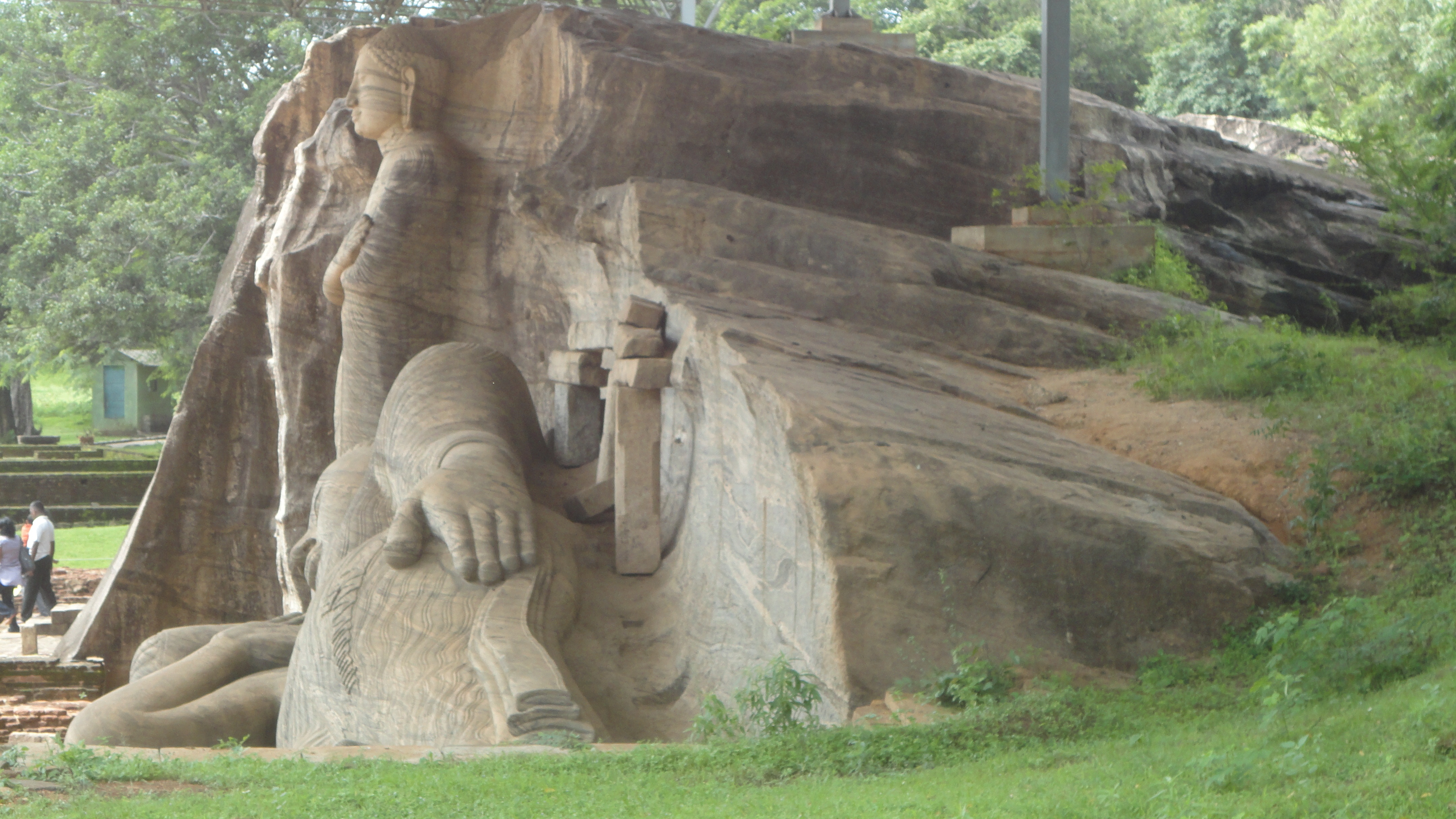
Gal Vihara

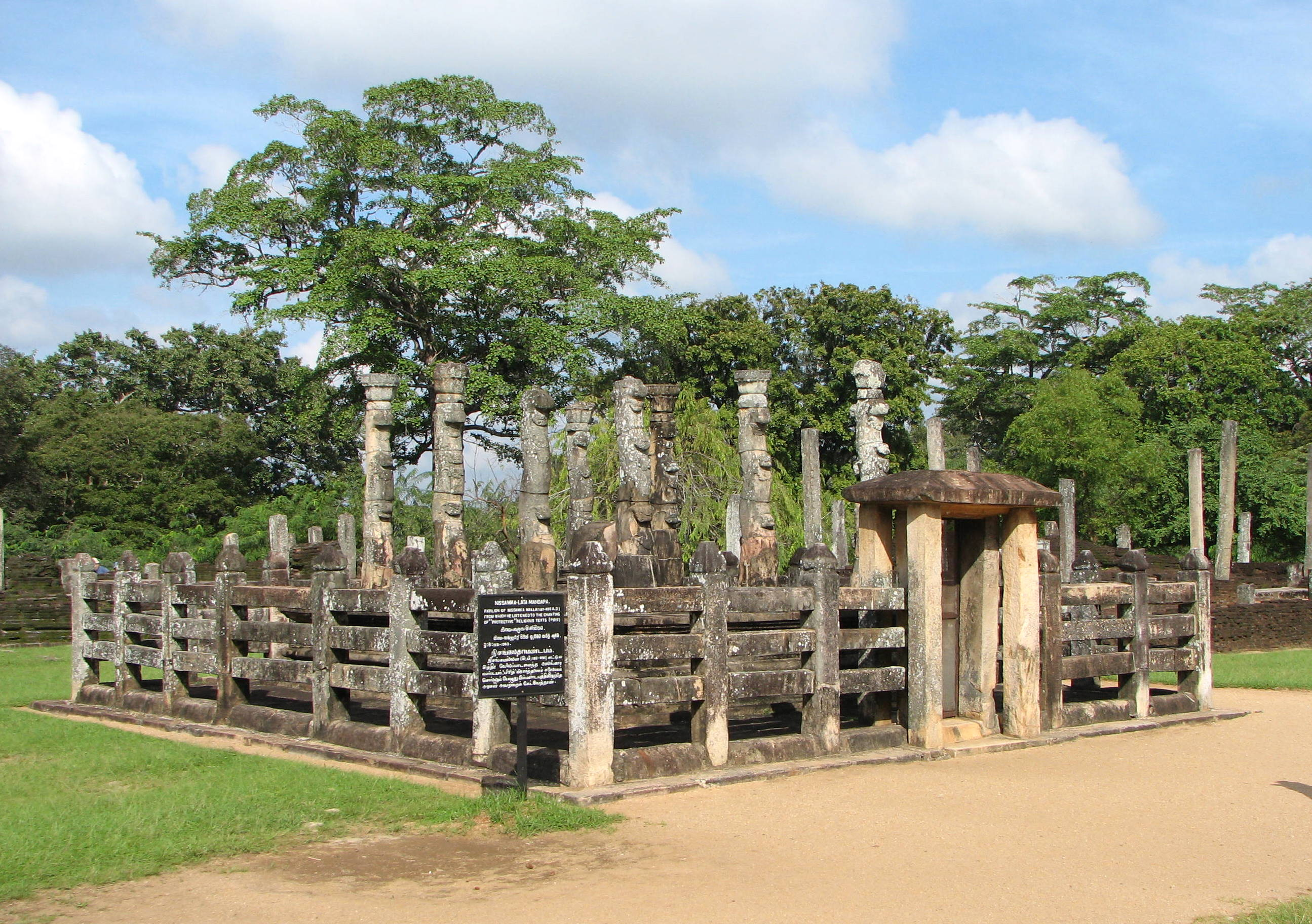
Nissanka Latha Mandapaya

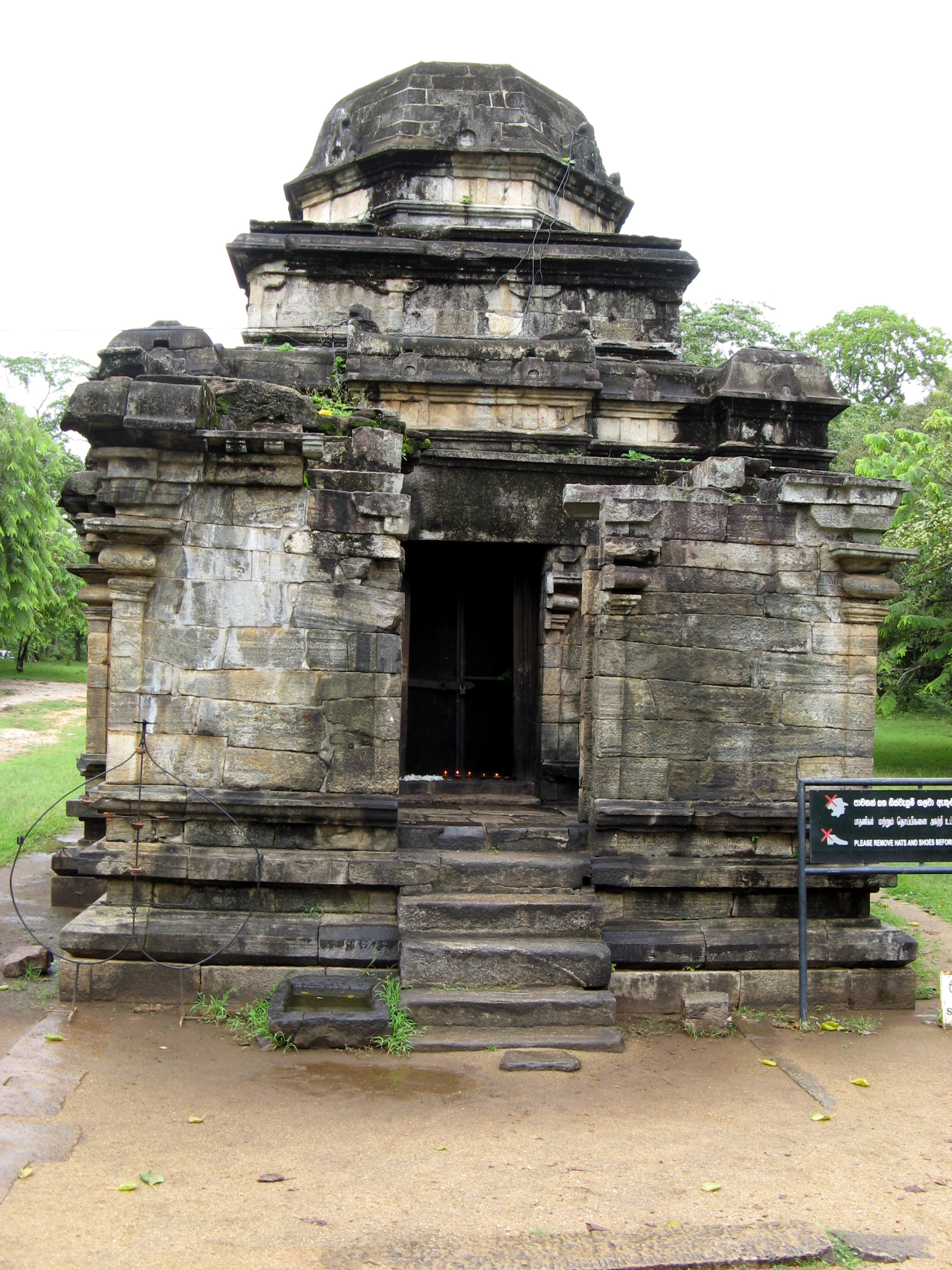
Polonnaruwa Siva Devale No. 2 (Note: Considered as one of the oldest Hindu shrine in Polonnaruwa founded during Chola occupation built during 1015-1044)

Upon Vijayabāhu I's death a succession dispute jeopardized the recovery from the Chola conquest. His successors proved unable to consolidate power, plunging the kingdom into a period of civil war from which Parākramabāhu I (1153–1186), a closely related royal emerged. Parākramabāhu I established control over the island and secured his recognition as Vijayabāhu I's heir by obtaining the tooth and bowl relics of the Buddha, which by now had become essential to the legitimacy of royal authority in Sri Lanka.

By the Polonnaruwa period, the Sinhalese already had centuries of experience in irrigation technology, and the rulers of Polonnaruwa, especially Parākramabāhu the Great, made notable contributions refining these techniques to meet the demands of the immense irrigation projects at the time. Sri Lanka's irrigation network was extensively expanded during the reign of Parākramabāhu the Great. He built 1470 reservoirs – the highest number by any ruler in Sri Lanka's history, repaired 165 dams, 3910 canals, 163 major reservoirs, and 2376 mini-reservoirs. His most famous construction is the Parakrama Samudra, the largest irrigation project of medieval Sri Lanka. Having re-established the political unification of the island, Parākramabāhu continued Vijayabāhu I policy in keeping a tight check on separatist tendencies within the island, especially in Rohana where particularism was a deeply ingrained political tradition. Parākramabāhu faced a formidable rebellion in 1160 as Rohana did not accept its loss of autonomy lightly. A rebellion in 1168 in Rajarata also manifested. Both were put down with great severity and all vestiges of its former autonomy were purposefully eliminated. Particularism was now much less tolerated than it was during the Anuradhapura period. This new over-centralization of authority in Polonnaruwa would however work against the Sinhalese in the future and the country would eventually pay dearly as a result.

Parākramabāhu I's reign is memorable for two major campaigns – in the south of India as part of a Pandyan war of succession, and a punitive strike against the kings of Ramanna (Myanmar) for various perceived insults to Sri Lanka. Parākramabāhu I was the last of the great ancient Sri Lankan kings. His reign is considered as a time when Sri Lanka was at the height of its power. Parākramabāhu I had no sons, which complicated the problem of succession upon his death. Amid the succession crisis a scion of a foreign dynasty, Niśśaṅka Malla established his claims as a Prince of Kalinga, (Note: The birthplace of Prince Vijaya and the ancestors of the Sinhalese.) claiming to be chosen and trained for the succession by Parākramabāhu I himself. He was also either the son-in-law or nephew of Parākramabāhu I.

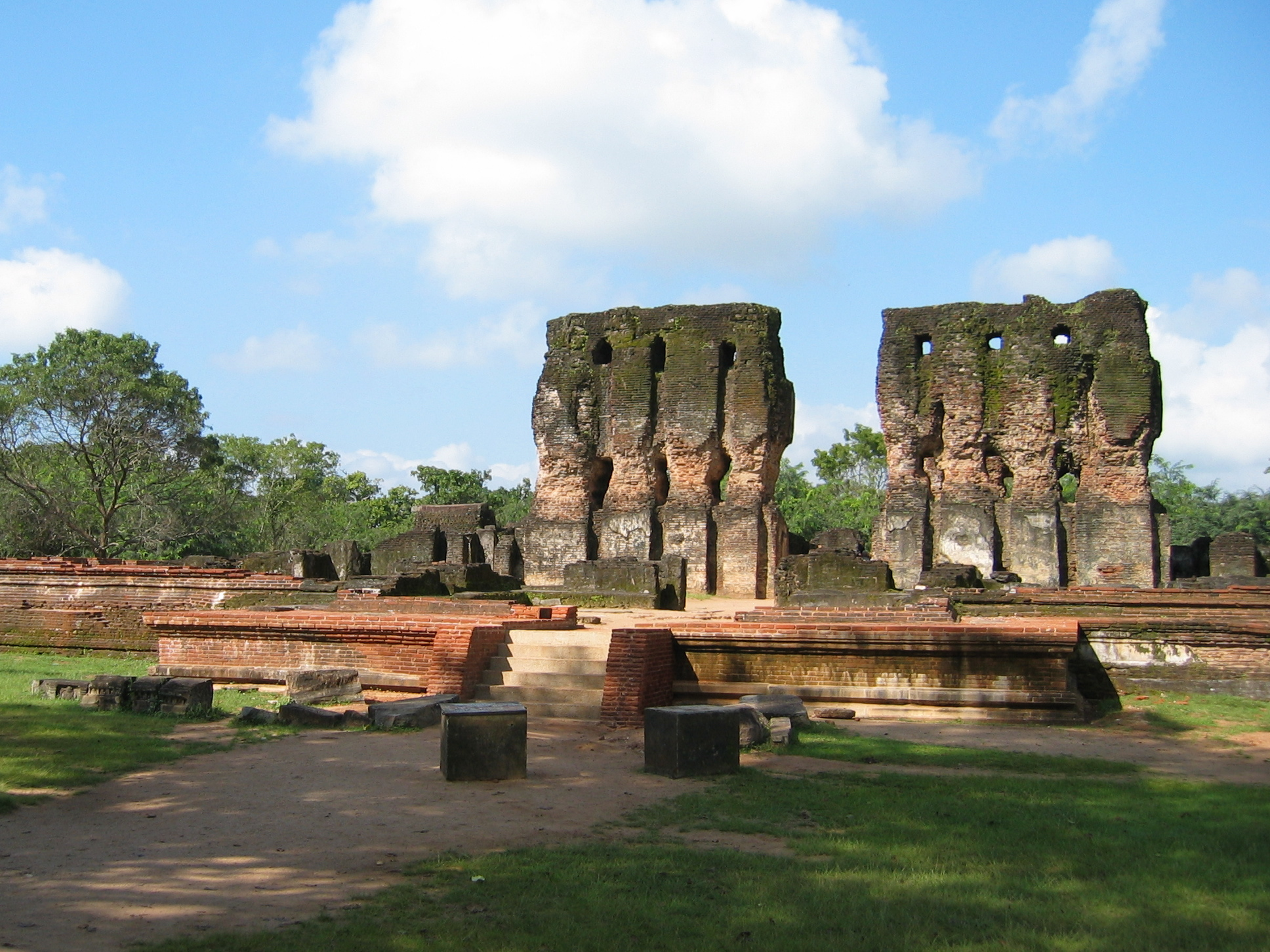
Ruins of Parākramabāhu I's royal palace at Polonnaruwa

Niśśaṅka Malla (1187–1196) was the first monarch of the House of Kalinga and the only Polonnaruwa monarch to rule over the whole island after Parākramabāhu I. His reign gave the country a brief decade of order and stability before the speedy and catastrophic break-up of the hydraulic civilisation of the dry zone. With his death there was a renewal of political dissension, now complicated by dynastic disputes. Though he and his predecessors Vijayabāhu I and Parākramabāhu I achieved much in state building, the conspicuous lack of restraint, especially that of Parākramabāhu I, in combination with an ambitious and venturesome foreign policy, and an expensive diversion of state resources towards public work projects, sapped the strength of the country and contributed to the kingdom's sudden and complete collapse.

The House of Kalinga would maintain itself in power, but only with the support of an influential faction within the country. Their survival owed much to the inability of the factions opposing them to come up with an aspirant to the throne with a politically viable claim, or sufficient durability once installed in power. Therefore, the House of Kalinga's hold on the throne was inherently precarious. On three occasions, the queen of Parākramabāhu I, Lilāvatī, was raised to the throne out of desperation. The factional struggle and political instability attracted the attention of South Indian adventurers bent on plunder, culminating in the devastating campaign of pillage under Māgha of Kalinga (1215–1236), claiming the inheritance of the kingdom through his kinsman who reigned before.

Māgha, a bigoted Hindu, persecuted Buddhists, despoiling the temples and giving away lands of the Sinhalese to his followers. His priorities in ruling were to extract as much as possible from the land and overturn as many of the traditions of Rajarata as possible. His reign saw the massive migration of the Sinhalese people to the south and west of Sri Lanka, and into the mountainous interior, in a bid to escape his power. Māgha's rule of 21 years and its aftermath are a watershed in the history of the island, creating a new political order. After his death in 1255, Polonnaruwa ceased to be the capital, Sri Lanka gradually decayed in power and from then on there were two, or sometimes three rulers existing concurrently. Parakramabahu VI of Kotte (1411–1466) would be the only other Sinhalese monarch to establish control over the whole island after this period. The Rajarata, the traditional location of the Sinhalese kingdom and Rohana, the previously autonomous subregion were abandoned. Two new centers of political authority emerged as a result of the fall of the Polonnaruwa Kingdom.

In the face of repeated South Indian invasions the Sinhalese monarchy and people retreated into the hills of the wet zone, further and further south, seeking primarily security. The capital was abandoned and moved to Dambadeniya by Vijayabāhu III establishing the Dambadeniya era of the Sinhalese kingdom. A second poilitical center emerged in the north of the island where Tamil settlers from previous Indian incursions occupied the Jaffna Peninsula and the Vanni. (Note: The land between Anuradhapura and Jaffna) Many Tamil members of invading armies, mercenaries, joined them rather than returning to India with their compatriots. By the 13th century, the Tamils too withdrew from the Vanni almost entirely into the Jaffna peninsula where an independent Tamil kingdom had been established.

== Kingdom ==
=== Agriculture ===
Starting from the era of Parakramabahu I, there was great interest in irrigation. He ordered:

Let no water drop that falls from the rain make it to the sea without being useful to the mankind

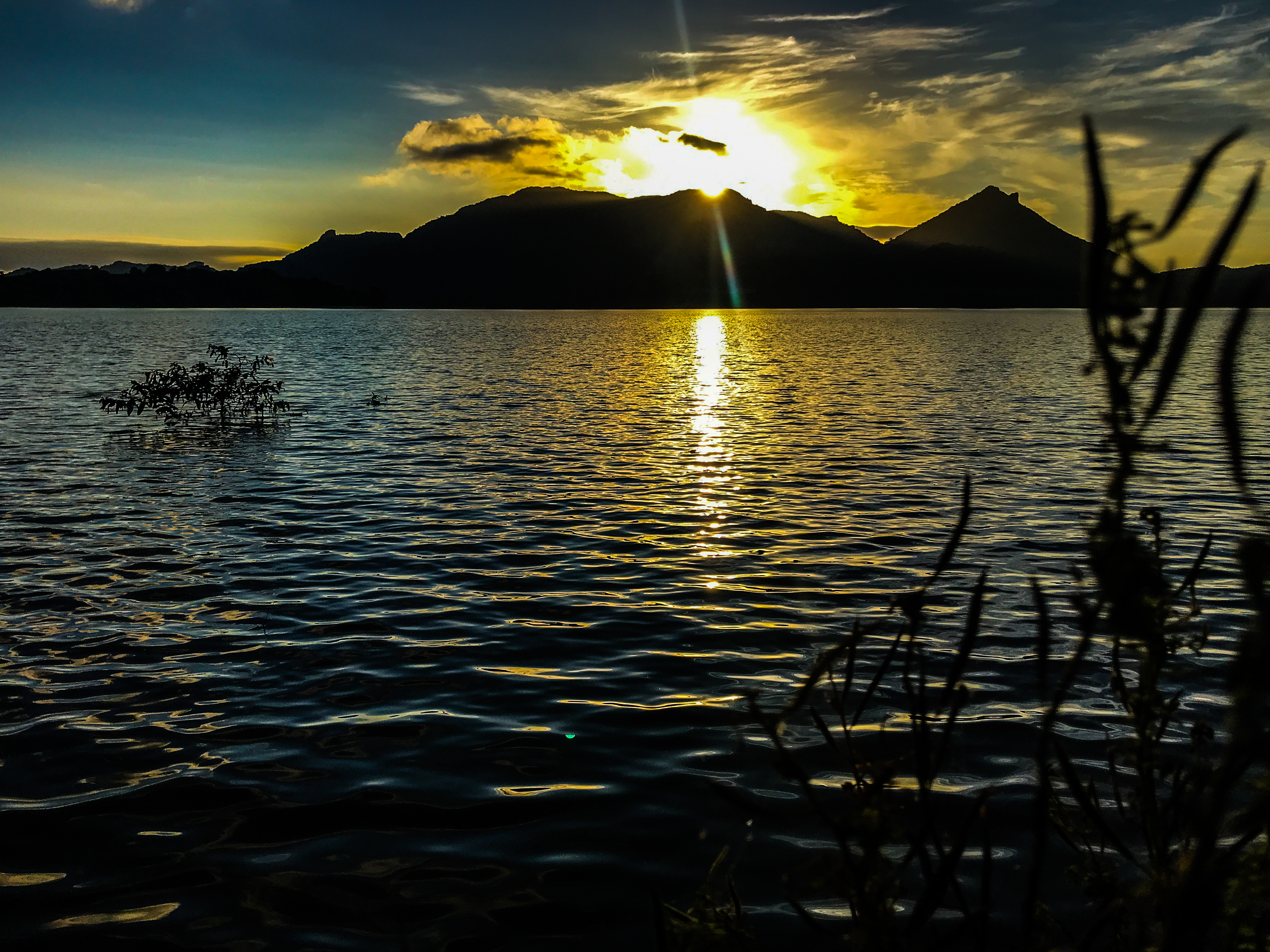
The Parakrama Samudra

Massive tanks were built for this purpose. Some of his notable works are the Parakrama Samudra and the Giritale tank. These works surpassed what existed during the Anuradhapura period. Previously built dams were also largely renovated during this period.

=== Demographics ===
The Sinhalese accounted for the majority, and the Sinhala language was the common language. Settlements from Cambodia are recorded, the Khmer settled in an area called Kambojavâsaĺa. The Khmer script was used to write Pali texts such as the Khmer script version of the Mahavamsa. (Note: This version of the Mahamvamsa was written during the Polonnaruwa period, it includes the content from the Culawamsa.)

=== Trade ===
Most trade was carried out through the main seaports of the principality, Kalpitiya, Halavatha (Chilaw) and Colombo.

==== Coinage ====
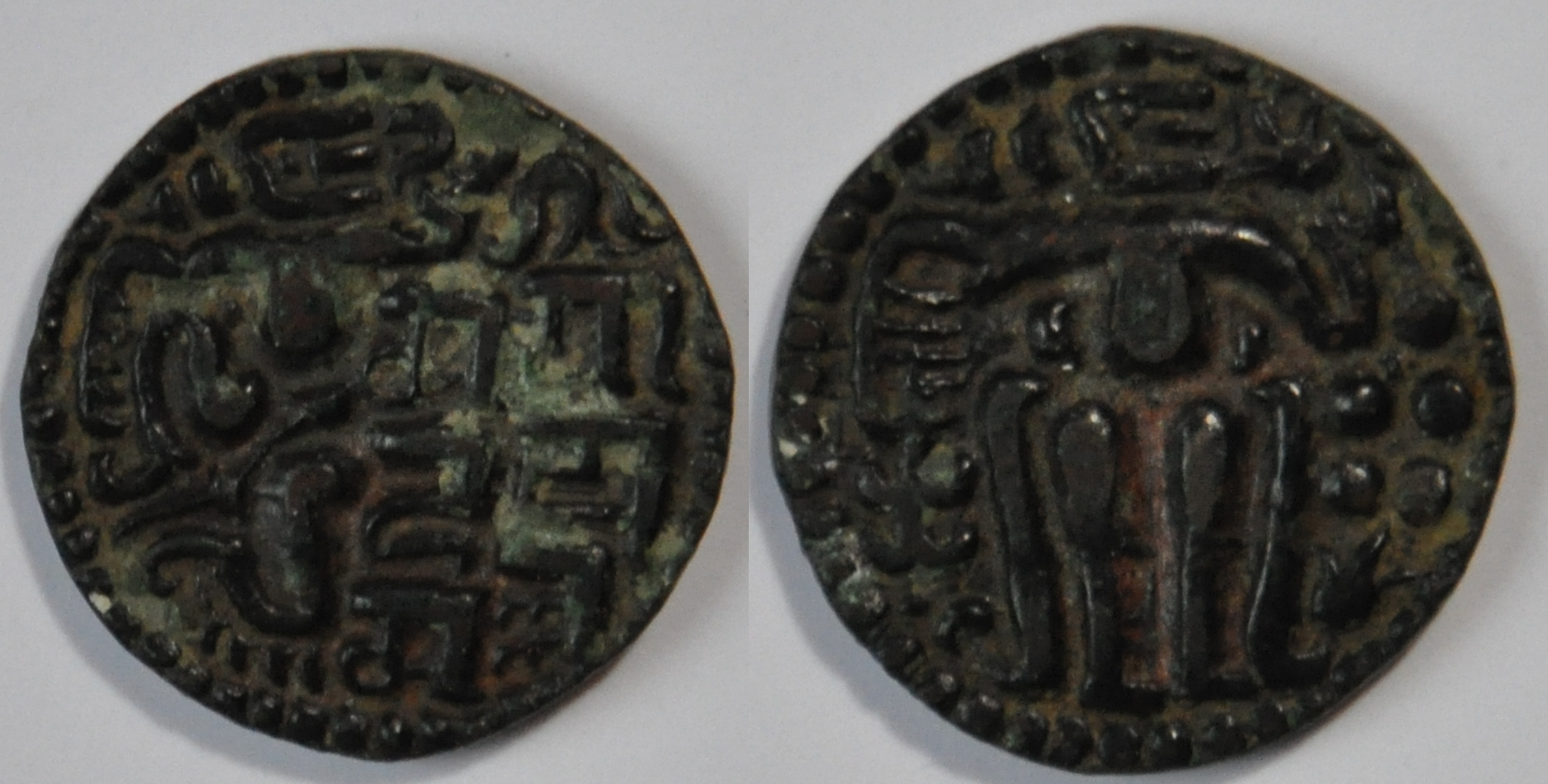
A Copper Massa coin of King Sahasamalla (1200 - 1202)

The coins, which were mostly made of copper, were modelled after their ruler. While gold coins also existed within the kingdom and were used, they largely disappeared in the very last days of Parakramabahu I. This may have been due to an economic crisis caused by the burden. The coinage of Polonnaruwa shows a great resemblance to that of RajaRaja I of the Chola kingdom.

Trade with the Chinese dynasties was extensively high at the period, and coins belonging to the Song dynasty have been found throughout Polonnaruwa.

Meanwhile, in the Pandyan country, the Kahapana currency was used.

=== Technology and structures ===
The ancient Sinhalese civilization was highly advanced in technology. While the irrigation systems of Polonnaruwa bore strong similarities to those of the Anuradhapura period, they represented a further stage of refinement and sophistication. James Emerson Tennent writes:

they attain a facility unsurpassed by any other people in the world.

Works of hydraulic architecture, ranging from dams to artificial reservoirs such as the Parakrama Samudra, demanded advanced technology and were constructed using engineering techniques.

==== Vatadage ====
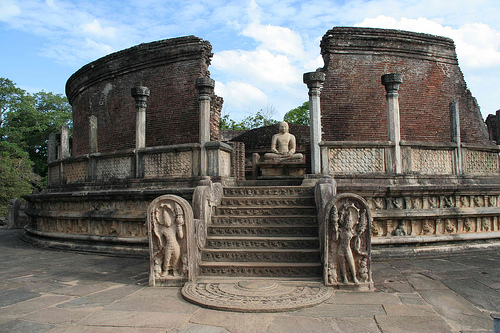
Vatadage

Vatadages were first constructed during the Anuradhapura period, but their development reached its peak in the Polonnaruwa period. The Polonnaruwa Vatadage is considered the "ultimate creation" out of all Vatadages. A Vatadage is built for the protection of a small stupa. The structure has two stone platforms decorated with elaborate stone carvings. The lower platform is entered through a single entrance facing the north, while the second platform can be accessed through four doorways facing the four cardinal points. The upper platform, surrounded by a brick wall, contains the stupa. Four Buddha statues are seated around it, each facing one of the entrances. Three concentric rows of stone columns had also been positioned here, presumably to support a wooden roof. The entire structure is decorated with stone carvings. Some of the carvings at the Polonnaruwa Vatadage, such as its moonstone (Sandakada Pahana), are considered to be the best examples of such architectural features. Although some archaeologists have suggested that it also had a wooden roof, this theory is disputed by others.

==== Reign of King Nissanka Malla ====
The Hatadage and Nissanka Latha Mandapaya were built by Nissanka Malla (1187–1197) to store the relics. Several relics including the tooth relic of the Buddha and rice bowls used by the Buddha are said to have been held in the Hatadage. Several historical sources including the Rajavaliya, Poojavaliya and the Galpotha inscription mention that it was built in sixty hours. Since the Sinhalese word Hata means sixty and Dage means relic shrine, it is possible that the structure was named Hatadage to commemorate this feat. Another theory is that it is so named because it held sixty relics.

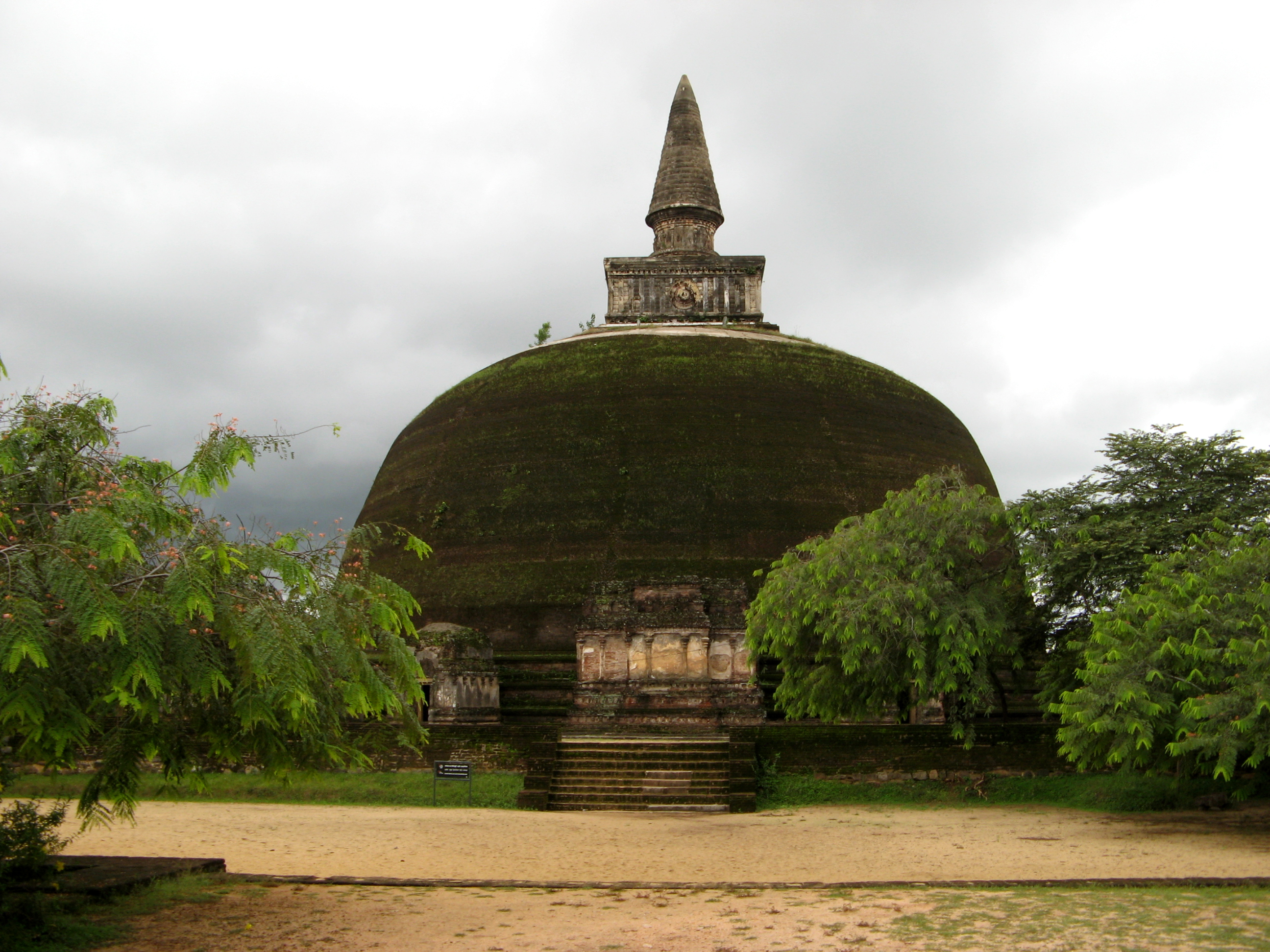
The Rankoth Vihara built by Nissanka Malla

Although he constructed many impressive structures, Nissanka Malla's apparent aim seems to have been to surpass the works of Parākramabāhu I. He also built a statue of himself.

== Military (1153–1186) ==
Parākramabāhu I structured the kingdom's armed forces, supplemented by auxiliary units primarily drawn from other Buddhist ethnic communities.

=== Ground forces ===
Under Parākramabāhu I, the ground forces of Polonnaruwa were organized into several branches. The Culavamsa suggests that their strength may have reached as many as 100,000 troops during the 1140s, prior to the first battle of Rajarata. While the army's size during the Pandyan War is not recorded, it was likely substantial as well.” The ground forces were divided between the main army, commanded by Lankapura Dandanatha, and the auxiliary units, which were composed largely of minority groups.

==== Army ====
During the initial phase of his reign, Parākramabāhu I placed his armies under the command of Rakkha, while other prominent generals were sent to support him in combating the Ruhunan separatist forces.”

==== Auxiliaries ====
The auxiliary units were used to reinforce the Sinhalese army on multiple occasions. These units were largely made up of Buddhist minorities, and tribals.

=== Naval forces ===
The first navy was organized in 1165. This was used for the invasion of Burma.

== Fall ==
Following the death of Kalinga Lokeshvara, his son Vira Bahu I took up power. However, he was killed by the military commander Tavuru Senavirat. A period of military rule was followed by the ascension of Vikramabahu I; who was assassinated by a nephew of Kalinga Lokeshvara, Chodaganga. The military once again organized a coup and arrested Chodaganga. The military became more dominant, ousting the monarchy; as a result, king Anikanga appealed for support from the Cholas. An army was sent, and Anikanga ascended the throne. The three month-old Dharmásoka of Polonnaruwa was slaughtered along with the commander of the Polonnaruwa Royal Army.

The military once again seized power, and Lilavati was installed on the throne. She was ousted by Lokissara, a military commander. The Royal Army, being a rival to Lokissara's forces, killed him.

=== Sacking of Lilavati ===
Parakrama Pandyan II from Pandyan Kingdom invaded Polonnaruwa, thus forcing Lilavati into exile. Parakrama Pandyan II ascended the throne, reigned between 1212 and 1215 CE. He was ousted by the invader, Kalinga Magha, who in the aftermath founded the Jaffna Kingdom. Kalinga Magha ruled for 21 years until he was also expelled from Polonnaruwa in 1236, with an invasion from the south.

=== Succession ===
After defeating and expelling Kalinga Magha (Note: Magha was defeated and his forces abandoned Polonnaruwa, Vijayabahu decided to not invade further into Jaffna which would have led to a weakening of his armies) from Polonnaruwa, Vijayabahu III moved the capital to Dambadeniya. He founded the House of Sri Sanga Bo.

== Religion ==
Buddhism continued to be the main religion in the Polonnaruwa era. Its monarchs enjoyed the exchange of religious jewels and other expensive items with the Theravada Buddhist kings of Siam, Burma, and Kampuchea. Prior to the Buddhist kings' takeover, there was a strong influence of Hinduism caused by Cholas. It is evident from the removal of the cow in Polonnaruwa moonstone, and also by the presence of Shiva temples in Polonnaruwa. After Chola rule, many viharas were renovated by Vijayabahu I and his successor Parakramabahu I.

=== Buddhism ===
The primary form of Buddhism practiced in the Polonnaruwa kingdom was the orthodox school of Theravada Buddhism; following religious reforms in Burma, many monks there aligned themselves with the Polonnaruwa monks.

=== Distribution to Cambodia ===
Khmer King Jayavarman VII sent his son Tamalinda to Polonnaruwa to be ordained as a Buddhist monk and study Theravada Buddhism according to the Pali scriptural traditions. Tamalinda then returned to the Angkor, and promoted Buddhist traditions according to the Theravada training he had received, galvanizing the long-standing Theravada presence that had existed throughout the Angkor for centuries.

== Gallery ==
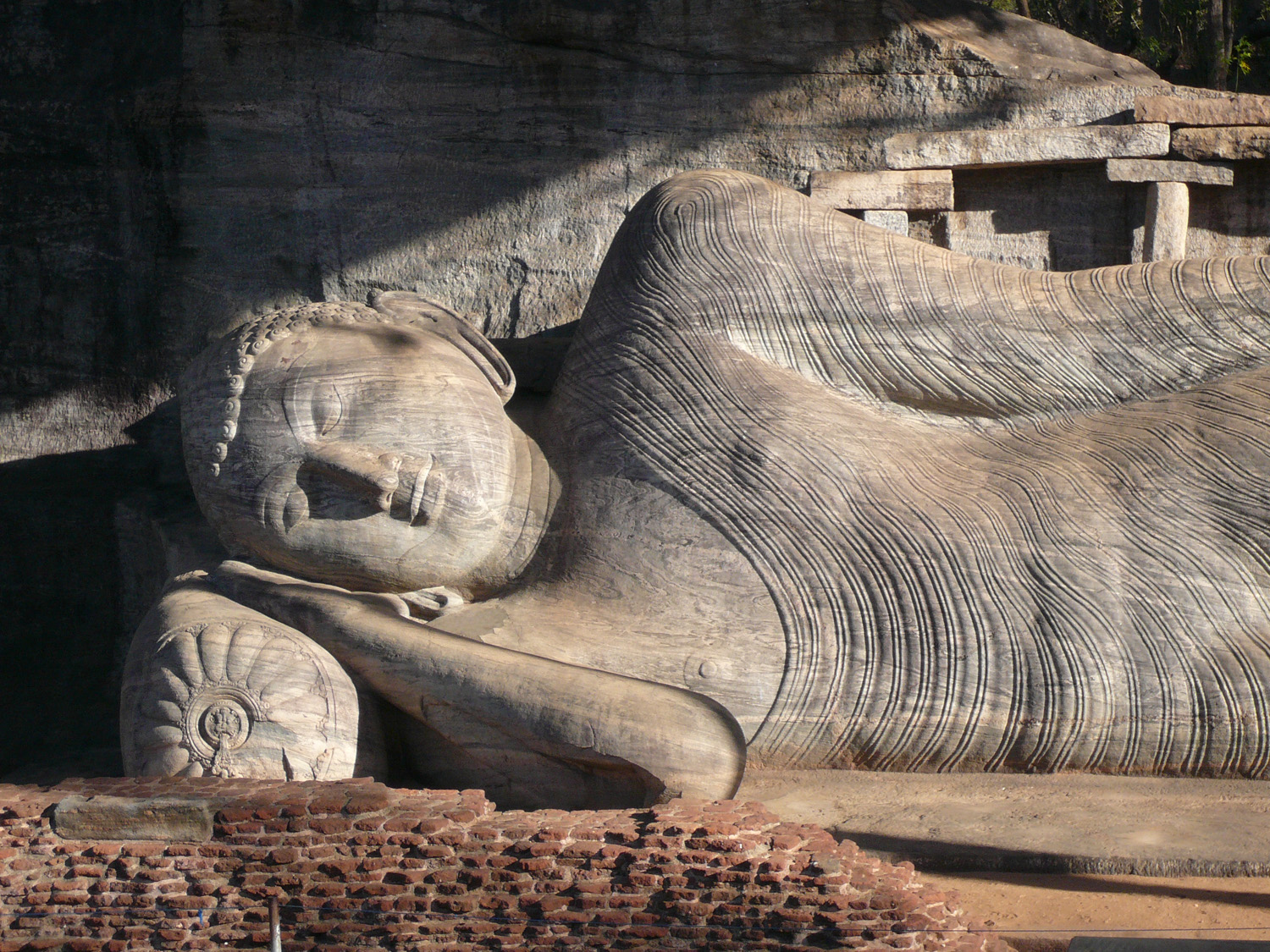
Buddha statues in Gal Vihara

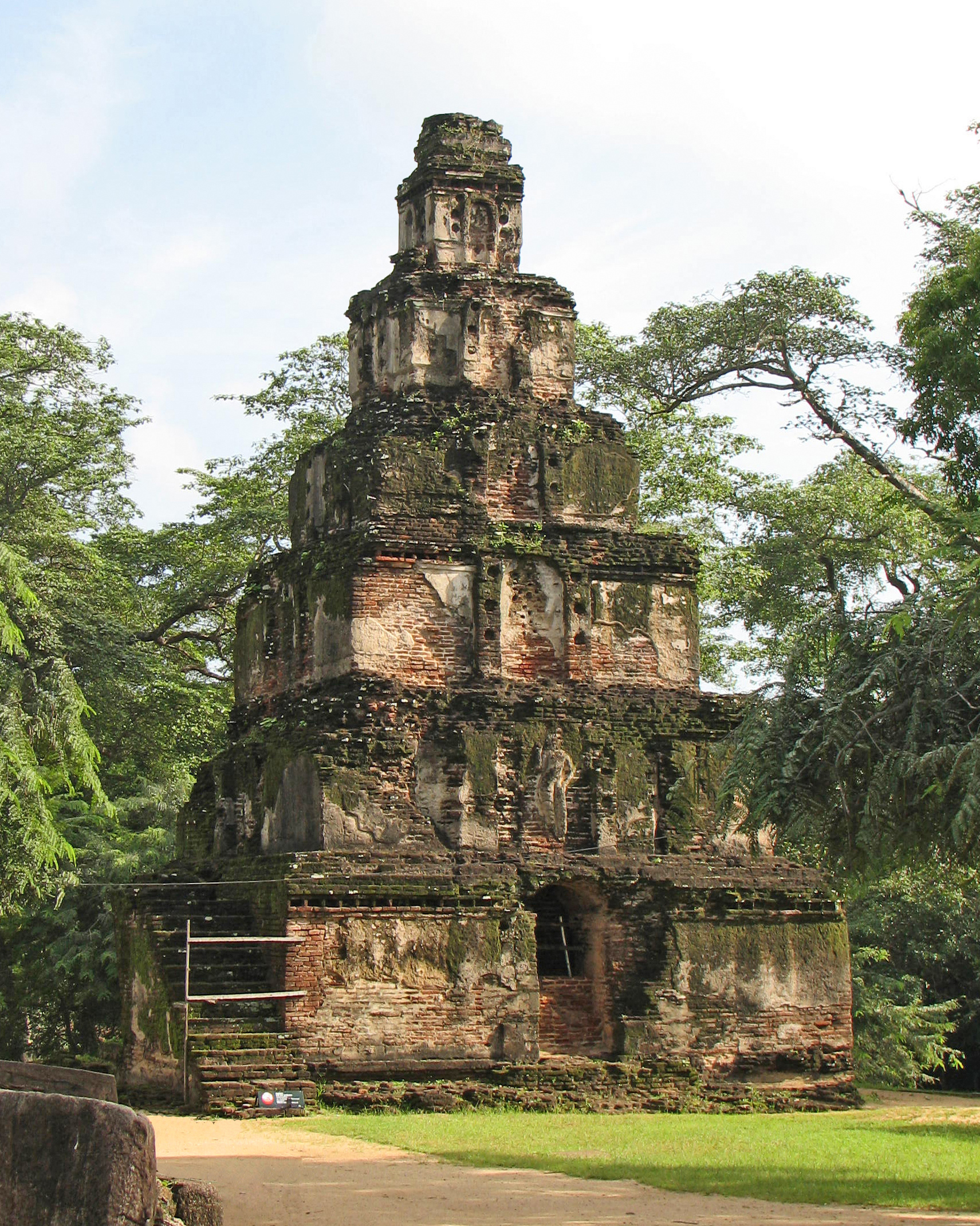
Seven storeyed Satmahal Prasada

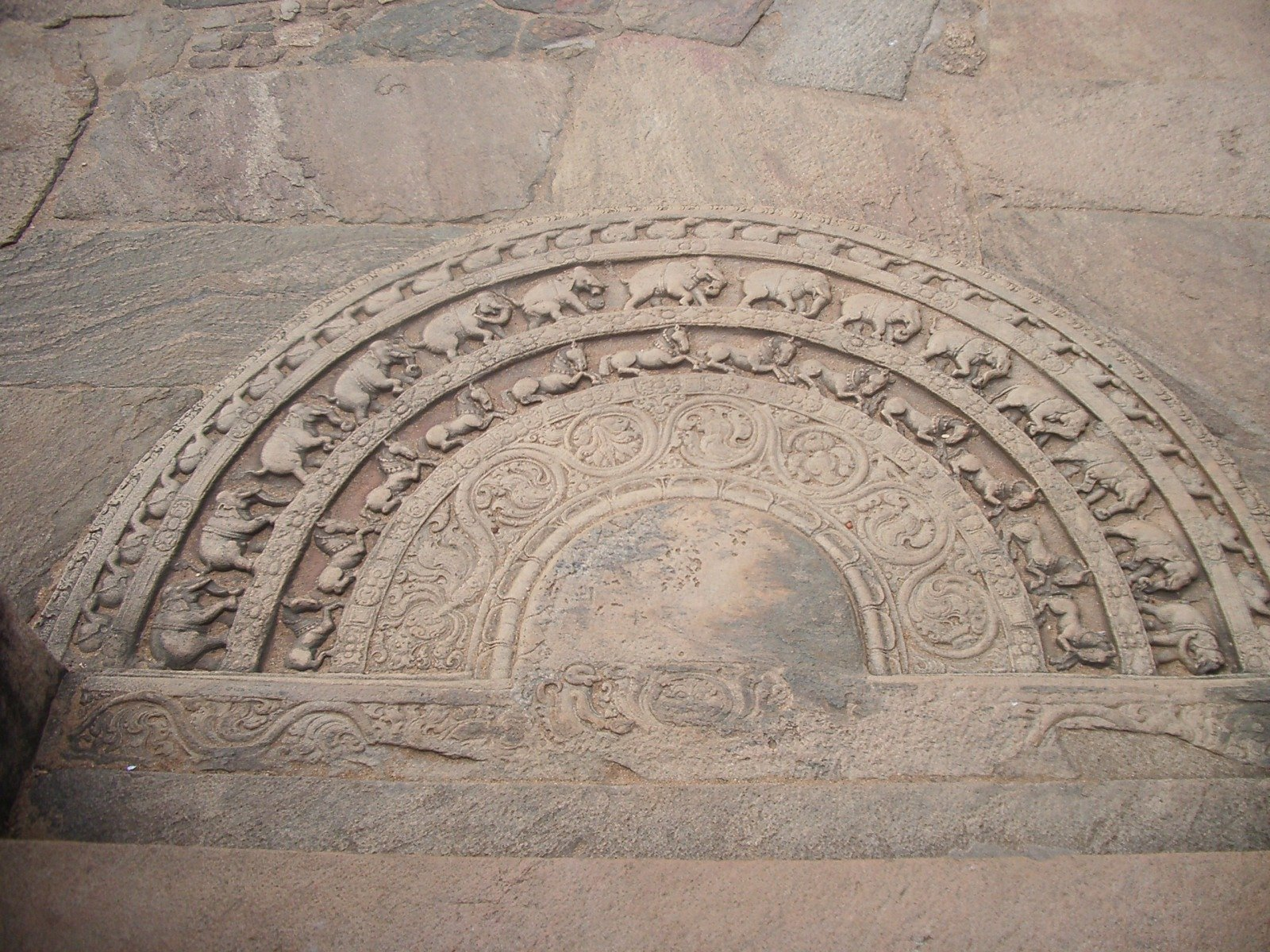
Moonstone of Polonnaruwa

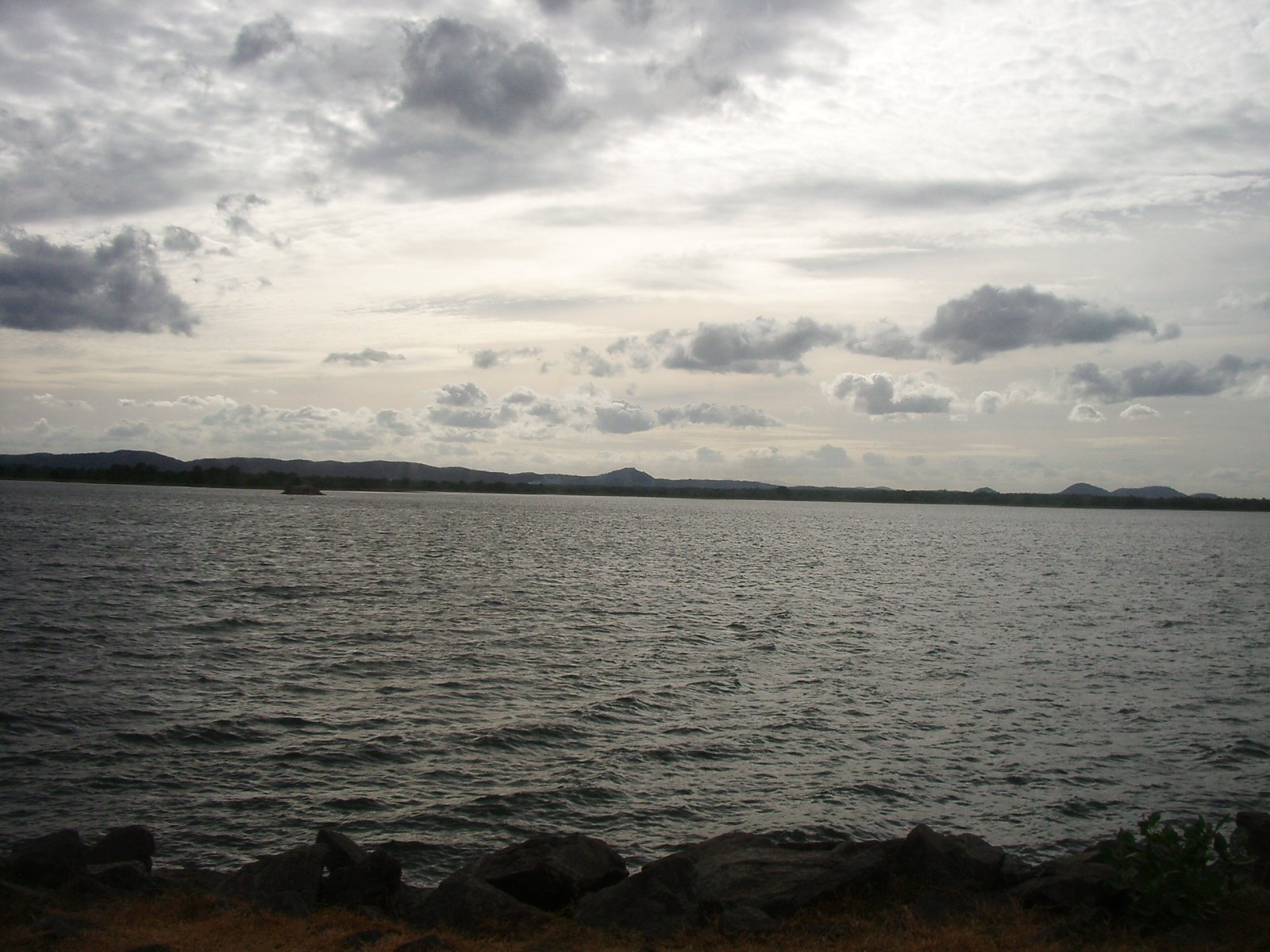
Parakrama Samudra built by king Parakramabahu I

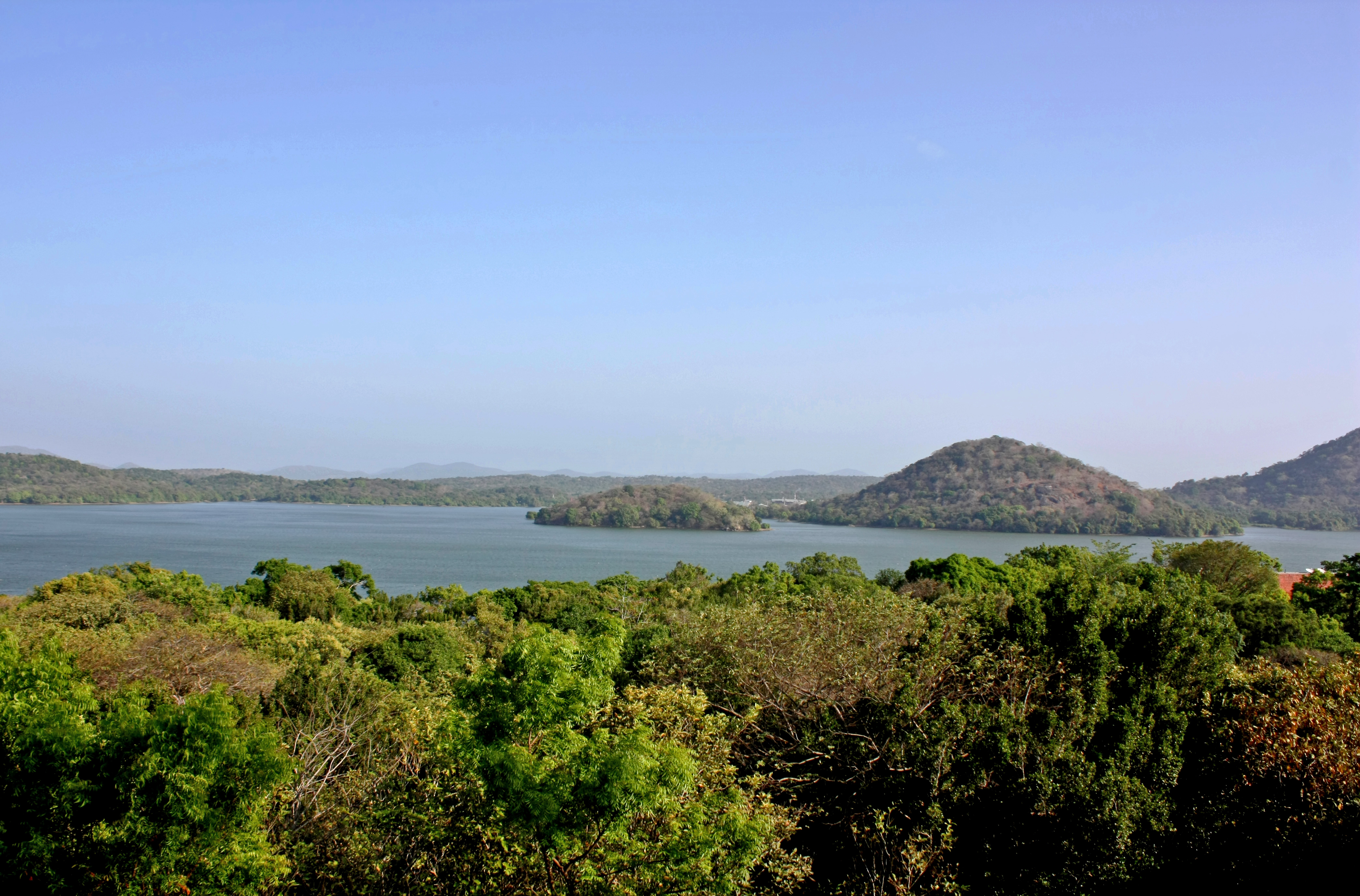
Giritale Tank was the deepest tank in Sri Lanka during the Polonnaruwa era.

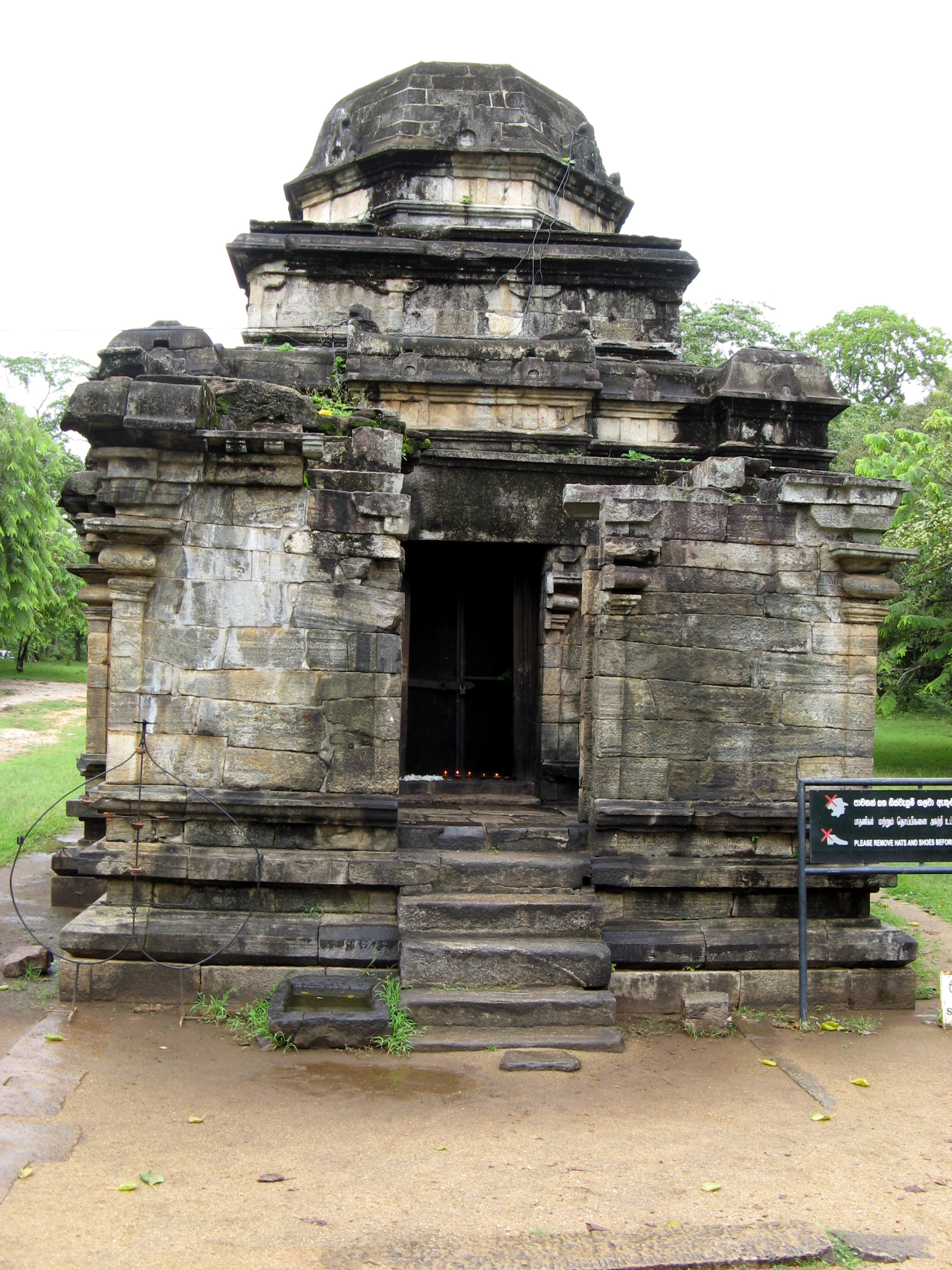
Shiva Devalaya in Polonnaruwa, dating back to the early years of Chola rule in Sri Lanka.

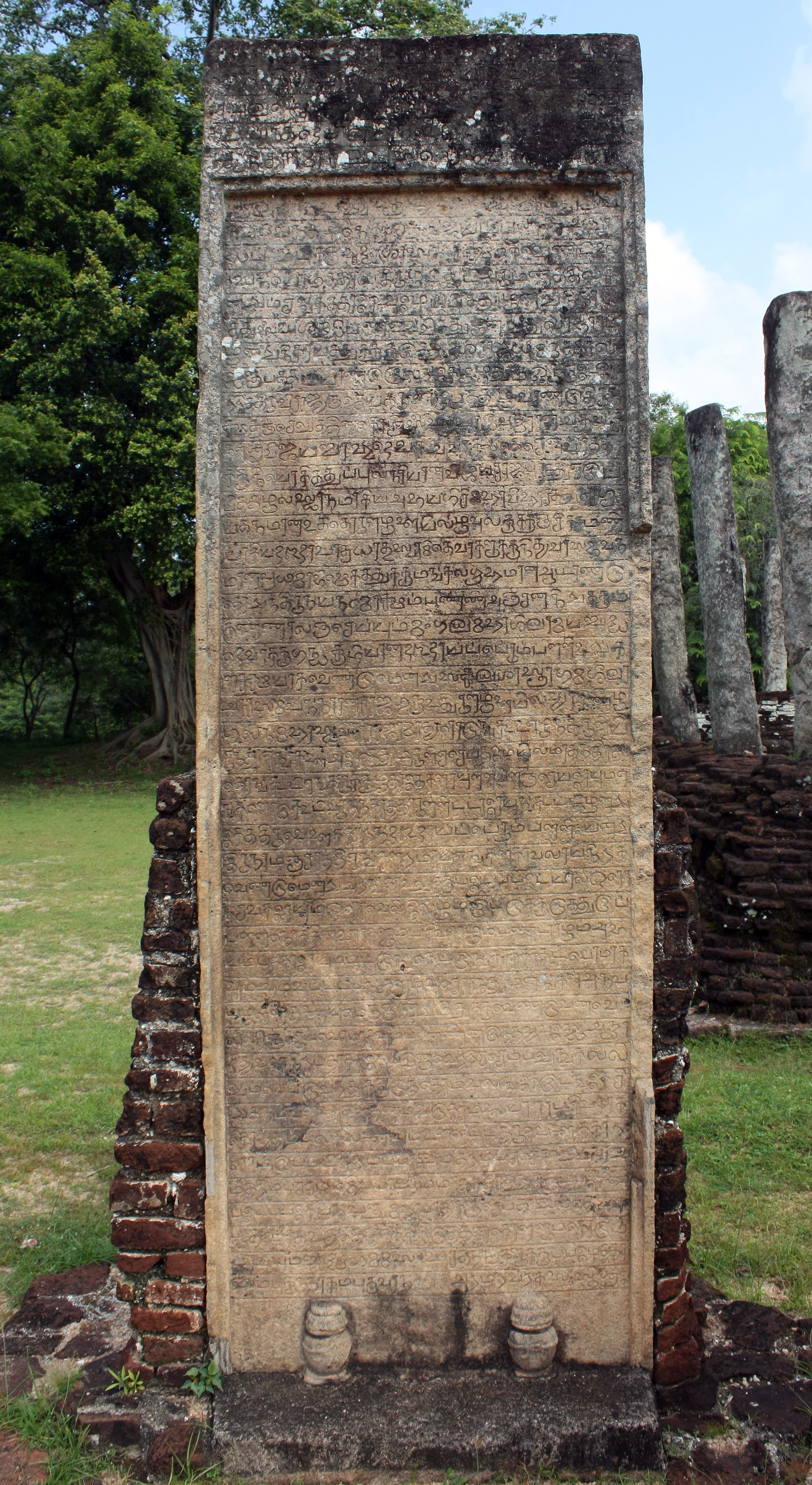
Polonnaruwa velaikkara (Tamil) inscription of Vijayabahu I

== See also ==
- Polonnaruwa period
- List of Sri Lankan monarchs
- Kalinga (historical region)
- Siri Parakum

== Citations ==
=== Sources ===
- Aiyangar, Krishnaswami S. (1991). South India and Her Muhammadan Invaders. Asian Educational Services. ISBN 978-81-206-0536-7.
- Bokay, Mon (1966). "Relations between Ceylon and Burma in the 11th Century A.D". Artibus Asiae. Supplementum. 23. JSTOR: 93–95. doi:10.2307/1522637. JSTOR 1522637.
- Codrington, H. W. (1926). A Short History Of Ceylon. London: Macmillan & Co.
- de Silva, K. M. (1981). A History of Sri Lanka. University of California Press. ISBN 9780520043206.
- de Silva, K. M. (2005). A History of Sri Lanka. Colombo: Vijitha Yapa Publications. ISBN 9789558095928.
- Deraniyagala, S. U. (December 1992). The Prehistory of Sri Lanka: An Ecological Perspective (1st ed.). Department of Archaeological Survey, Government of Sri Lanka. ISBN 9789559159001.
- Herath, R. B. (2002). Sri Lankan Ethnic Crisis: Towards a Resolution. Trafford Publishing. ISBN 9781553697930.
- Indrapala, K. (1969). "Early Tamil Settlements in Ceylon". The Journal of the Ceylon Branch of the Royal Asiatic Society of Great Britain & Ireland. 13. JSTOR: 43–63. JSTOR 43483465.
- Nicholas, Cyril Wace; Paranavitana, Senerat (1961). A Concise History of Ceylon: From the Earliest Times to the Arrival of the Portuguese in 1505. Ceylon University Press.
- Parker, Henry (1909). Ancient Ceylon. London: Luzac & Co.
- Peebles, Patrick (2006). The History of Sri Lanka. Greenwood Publishing Group. ISBN 9780313332050.
- Sastri, K. A (1935). The CōĻas. Madras: University of Madras.
- Senaveratna, John M. (1930). The Story of the Sinhalese from the Most Ancient Times Up to the End of "the Mahavansa" Or Great Dynasty: Vijaya to Maha Sena, B.C. 543 to A.D.302. Colombo: W. M. A. Wahid & Bros. ISBN 9788120612716.
- Siriweera, W. I. (2002). History of Sri Lanka: From Earliest Times Up to the Sixteenth Century. Dayawansa Jayakody & Company. ISBN 9789555512572.
- Spencer, George W. (May 1976). "The Politics of Plunder: The Cholas in Eleventh-Century Ceylon". The Journal of Asian Studies. 35 (3): 405–419. doi:10.2307/2053272. ISSN 1752-0401. JSTOR 2053272. S2CID 154741845.

- Balasubrahmanyam, S. R. (1971). Early Chola Temples: Parantaka I to Rajaraja I, A.D. 907-985. Orient Longman.
- Barnes, Ruth; Parkin, David (2015). Ships and the Development of Maritime Technology on the Indian Ocean. India: Routledge. ISBN 978-1-317-79343-4.
- Corrington, H.W (1926). A Short History of Ceylon. London: Macmillian publishers.
- Fernando, M.; Pieris, M. (1973). History of Ceylon (Sri Lanka).
- Finegan, Jack (1989). An Archaeological History of Religions of Indian Asia. Paragon. ISBN 0-913729-43-4.
- Haraprasad Ray, ed. (2007). Studies on India, China, and South East Asia: Posthumous Papers of Prof. Adhir Chakravarti. RNB. ISBN 978-81-87661-39-9.
- Harvey, Godfrey Eric (1925). History of Burma from the Earliest Times to 10 March 1824. London: Longmans.
- Keuneman, Hubert (1983). Gottberg, John; Anthonis, Ravindralal (eds.). Sri Lanka. Apa Productions. ISBN 978-9971-925-22-2.
- Manchanayake, Palitha; Bandara, M. (1999). Water Resources of Sri Lanka. National Science Foundation. ISBN 978-955-590-008-9.
- Mendis, G. C. (December 1996). The Early History of Ceylon and Its Relations with India and Other Foreign Countries. Asian Educational Services. ISBN 978-81-206-0209-0.
- Obesekara. Heritage of Sri Lanka.
- Paranavitana, Senarat; Nicolas, C. (1961). A Concise History of Ceylon. Colombo: Ceylon University Press. OCLC 465385.
- Rambukwelle, P. B. (1993). Commentary on Sinhala Kingship: Vijaya to Kalinga Magha. P.B. Rambukwelle. ISBN 978-955-95565-0-3.
- Robert, R. A history of Early Southeast Asia.
- Wijesekera, Nandadeva (1984). Heritage of Sri Lanka. Archaeological Society of Sri Lanka.
- Wright, Arnold (1999). Twentieth Century Impressions of Ceylon: Its History, People, Commerce, Industries, and Resources. Asian Educational Services. ISBN 978-81-206-1335-5.
- Yapa (2010). Sri Lanka. Imgram Publications.
