= Kester =

Kester may refer to:

- Kester (name), a surname and given name
- Kester (artist), alias of Mozambican artist Cristóvão Canhavato
- Kester, Belgium, a village in the Belgian municipality of Gooik
- Kester, West Virginia, unincorporated community in Roane County
