= Relic: Guardians of the Museum =

British children's game show

- Genre: Children's game show
- Starring: Gemma Arrowsmith
- Theme music composer: Dobs Vye
- No. of series: 1
- No. of episodes: 13

Production
- Production location: BBC Elstree Centre
- Running time: 30 minutes

Original release
- Network: BBC One; CBBC (last 3 episodes)
- Release: 21 January – 29 March 2010

Relic: Guardians of the Museum is a British children's game show that originally aired on BBC One for the first 10 episodes before moving to CBBC for the last 3 episodes and ran from 21 January to 29 March 2010.

== Format ==
A ghostly 1920s British Museum tour guide named Agatha will guide three children from one town on a quest to help them defeat the evil Dark Lord, whose servants, cowled figures called the Dark Forces, glide the darkened corridors and display rooms of the museum. The children have only one night to discover the secrets of a relic in the museum. To do so, Agatha helps them time-travel to three different periods where they face three challenges. The prize for each challenge is a vision showing them lore of the relic, narrated by Agatha; if the team wins the challenge, they all see the vision, but if they fail, only one of them sees it and must convey the contents by their own memory.

After seeing all three visions, Agatha leads the children to the Great Court, where they face the Dark Lord. If the children win, they will be awarded the golden scarab and will become "Guardians of the Museum". But if they fail, they become relics themselves and part of the museum forever.

=== The Challenges ===
Agatha carries a special torch that acts as the focus for her powers of time-traveling and viewing the visions, among other abilities. Each night's three challenges were selected from the following:

==== Pandora's Boxes ====
The team is transported to Greece in the 7th Century BC, in a room of white marble where dwells Pandora, daughter of the gods. Pandora guides the team to pick between three magical boxes. Two of the boxes contain a treat (white grapes) while the third, Pandora's box, contains one of the three Furies. The vengeful spirit can move to a different box every round. The team passes if they open three treat boxes before opening Pandora’s Box three times.

==== Egyptian Trivia ====
The team is transported to Ancient Egypt in the 1st Century BC, in Cleopatra's throne room. Cleopatra challenges the team with true/false trivia questions about ancient Egyptian culture. The team must come to a consensus for their answer, and then one of their members must place their arm in a pot labeled True or False depending on their answer. If they are incorrect, the asp within the pot will bite them. The team passes if they give three correct answers before giving three incorrect answers.

==== Roman Trivia ====
The team is transported to Ancient Rome in the 1st Century AD, in a stone dungeon where the team is bound to the walls by ropes around their wrists. The unintelligent but cruel General Gluteus Maximus comes in and challenges the team with true/false trivia questions about ancient Roman culture, promising to free the team if they win and decapitate them if they lose. The team must come to a consensus for their answer, and if they are wrong, the General splashes them with sewage slop. The team passes if they give three correct answers before giving three incorrect answers (though whether they win or lose, the General still plans to cut off their heads, only for Agatha to freeze him with her torch and free the team).

==== Save the Slaves ====
The team is transported to Rome in the 1st Century AD, in an observation area of an arena. Three of Emperor Nero's least favored slaves stand on a ledge overlooking a pit with a ferocious and hungry lion, and eight cloth bags hang beneath the observation area. If the team pulls a bag with a Fight card, they must choose a slave to feed to the lion. The team passes if they pull three Pardon scrolls before pulling three Fight cards.

==== Dragon Tablets ====
The team is transported to China in the 8th Century AD, in a temple. Twenty wooden tablets rest nearby along with a pair of plinths, and above the bell are four paper lanterns. The team must go one at a time to retrieve a tablet, place it upon the plinths, and chop it open. Four of the tablets contain yellow ribbons that represent the spirits of dragons; each ribbon revealed will light a lantern. The team passes if they free all four dragons within 90 seconds.

==== Leech Levels ====
The team is transported to Medieval England in the 14th Century AD, in a straw-filled doctor’s office. Five patients there are suffering from an illness, for which the cure at the time was an average of five leeches. Starting from that average, the team must determine if the number of leeches each patient needs is higher or lower than the preceding number. If they are incorrect, they must each chew on one of the leeches (with Agatha warning that “you should only take leeches if you are accompanied by a dead tour guide like myself”). The team passes if they give three correct answers before giving three incorrect answers.

==== Shrine of Tláloc ====
The team is transported to Central America in the 16th Century AD, inside a pyramid shrine to Tláloc, the Aztec god of rain. Within are nine square tablets of varying sizes, colored differently on each side, and the team must assemble them into a pyramid. At random intervals, when a thunderclap sounds, the clock stops as the team lies on nearby plinths while Tláloc enters and destroys part or all of the pyramid, then causes one of the plinths to retract into the wall, putting one team member out of the game (if another team member was already out, they are released). The team passes if the pyramid is correctly assembled at the end of 90 seconds (and Agatha uses her torch to free the team member still trapped in the wall).

==== Tenochtitlan Turquoise ====
The team is transported to Central America in the 16th Century AD, in the ruined pyramid of Tenochtitlan. On the other side of a brick wall is a dark chamber where treasure can be found. The team must cross to the other chamber one at a time through a hole in the wall, locate a turquoise medal within, and deposit it into a wagon on a small track connecting the two sides for their teammates to pull back, then roll under an opening and closing door to return to the first chamber. The team passes if they retrieve all five turquoise medals and return to the first chamber within 90 seconds.

==== Jahanara’s Cage ====
The team is transported to India in the 17th Century AD, before a rickety bridge over reptile-infested waters. On the other side of the bridge is a cage in which Jahanara Begum has been imprisoned by her younger brother. The team has eight keys at their disposal, and must cross the bridge one at a time to try each key in each lock. The team passes if they release all three locks within 90 seconds.

==== Sarcophagus Spelling ====
The team is transported to Egypt in the 20th Century AD, inside a pyramid tomb. The pharaoh’s sarcophagus bears five hieroglyphs, while three open sarcophagi each have three sand-covered panels at their heads that tell which English letter the hieroglyphs match. The team must go one at a time to the open coffins and brush away the sand on a panel: uncovering a hieroglyph on the coffin will cause the panel to spin, revealing the English letter, while uncovering a different hieroglyph will awaken one of the mummies within the open sarcophagus. The team passes if they reveal all five characters of the pharaoh’s name before they awaken all three mummies.

==== Tipi Trivia ====
The team is transported to North America in the 17th Century AD, inside a Native American tipi. Agatha calls on the Native Americans’ ancient ancestors to receive three Native American relics, which she presents to the team one by one with three possible definitions for the object’s purpose. The team collectively agrees which definition they believe is correct, and select one for each object before learning the answers. The team passes if they get at least two of the answers correct.

==== Assyrian Archaeology ====
The team is transported to Assyria in the 20th Century AD, at the site of an archaeological dig. A sandbox before them divided into 18 squares contains treasures and scorpions, with a map nearby that hints at the placement of each. Using a brush and trowel, the team must search the covered squares for ancient treasures (twin lion headed bracelets). The team passes if they retrieve three treasures before revealing three scorpions.

=== The Final Battle ===
After all the three challenges are over, Agatha takes the children to the museum's Great Court, where she summons the Dark Lord for the final battle. The Dark Lord calls the children one by one and asks them questions about the relic and its surrounding details in the three visions. After the Dark Lord has asked his question and the contestant has given his/her answer, the appropriate part of the vision is then shown to see whether the contestant has answered correctly. A correct answer earns the team one of three 'passes', and the contestant is then told by the Dark Lord to go back to the others and wait to be called forward again. However, an incorrect answer or passing on a question results in the contestant being taken by the Dark Lord, disappearing and reappearing in a glass display case.

If the Dark Lord takes all three children, then he has won and his darkness reigns, with the children remaining in the glass display case as part of the museum "forever." But if the children answer three questions successfully, the Dark Lord loses; he is banished, resulting in the contestant(s) taken by him being free. Agatha then awards each of them with a golden scarab, and informs them that they are now "Guardians of the Museum", bidding them farewell as they leave the museum at dawn.

=== Relics ===
The series was produced to tie in with the Radio 4 series A History of the World in 100 Objects. The thirteen 'relics" are a selection from the hundred featured in the radio series, which in turn were selected from an estimated seven million in the British Museum collection.

== Awards ==
In 2010 the show won a BAFTA award in the entertainment category.

== Episodes ==
There are 13 episodes altogether. These are the episodes. Bold indicates guardians who answered all of their questions correctly in the final battle.

1. Newcastle: **Natasha**, **Vanessa** & **Stacy** (Won) Relic: The Benin Plaques
2. Hounslow: Damien, Tion & Raj (Lost) Relic: The Mummy Of Hornedijtef
3. Brighton: Nancy, Keishon & **Remy** (Won) Relic: The Game Of Ur
4. Edinburgh: Anthony, **Sophie** & **Rory** (Won) Relic: The Hoxne Hoard
5. Wandsworth: **Kofi**, **Jade** & Tom (Won) Relic: The Head Of Augustus
6. Leeds: Isaac, Georgia & Maryam (Lost) Relic: The Sutton Hoo Helmet
7. Islington: Lucas, Max & **Lorelle** (Won) Relic: The Pieces Of Eight
8. Hackney: Kesley, Robert & Rameen (Lost) Relic: The Bust of Ramesses
9. Enfield: **Clinton**, China & **Jas** (Won) Relic: The Double-headed Serpent
10. Birmingham: **Mark**, Wallis & Rachelle (Won) Relic: Dürer's Rhinoceros
11. Colchester: David, Harry & Ryan (Lost) Relic: The Tang Tomb Figures
12. Cardiff: Jude, Natalie & George (Lost) Relic: The Rosetta Stone
13. Bromley: **George**, Ellie & Charlotte (Won) Relic: Hoa Hakananai'a

== Cast ==
- Gemma Arrowsmith as Agatha
- uncredited as the Dark Lord
- Helen Evans as Cleopatra (intermittently)
- George Sawyer as Roman Legionary Gluteus Maximus (intermittently)
- Jolana Lee as Pandora (intermittently)
- Sophia Maria as Princess Jahanara (intermittently)
