= A History of the World in 100 Objects =

BBC Radio 4-British Museum collaboration

- Format: Audio

Technical specifications
- Audio format: MP3

Publication
- No. of episodes: 103
- Provider: BBC

Related
- Website: www.bbc.co.uk/programmes/b00nrtd2

Cover of A History of the World in 100 Objects, the companion book by Neil MacGregor

A History of the World in 100 Objects is a joint project of BBC Radio 4 and the British Museum, consisting of a 100-part radio series written and presented by British Museum director Neil MacGregor. In 15-minute presentations broadcast on weekdays on Radio 4, MacGregor used objects of ancient art, industry, technology and arms, all of which are in the British Museum's collections, as an introduction to parts of human history. The series, four years in planning, began on 18 January 2010 and was broadcast over 20 weeks. A book to accompany the series, A History of the World in 100 Objects by Neil MacGregor, was published by Allen Lane on 28 October 2010. The entire series is also available for download along with an audio version of the book for purchase. The British Museum won the 2011 Art Fund Prize for its role in hosting the project.

In 2016, a touring exhibition of several items depicted on the radio programme, also titled A History of the World in 100 Objects, travelled to various destinations, including Abu Dhabi (Manarat Al Saadiyat), Taiwan (National Palace Museum in Taipei), Japan (Tokyo Metropolitan Art Museum in Tokyo, Kyushu National Museum in Daizafu, and Kobe City Museum in Kobe), Australia (Western Australian Museum in Perth and National Museum of Australia in Canberra), and China (National Museum of China in Beijing, Shanghai Museum in Shanghai and Hong Kong Heritage Museum in Hong Kong).

The ownership claims of the British Museum over some of these objects is highly contested, in particular those belonging to the Benin Bronzes and the Elgin Marbles, which are the subject of continued international controversy.

== Content ==
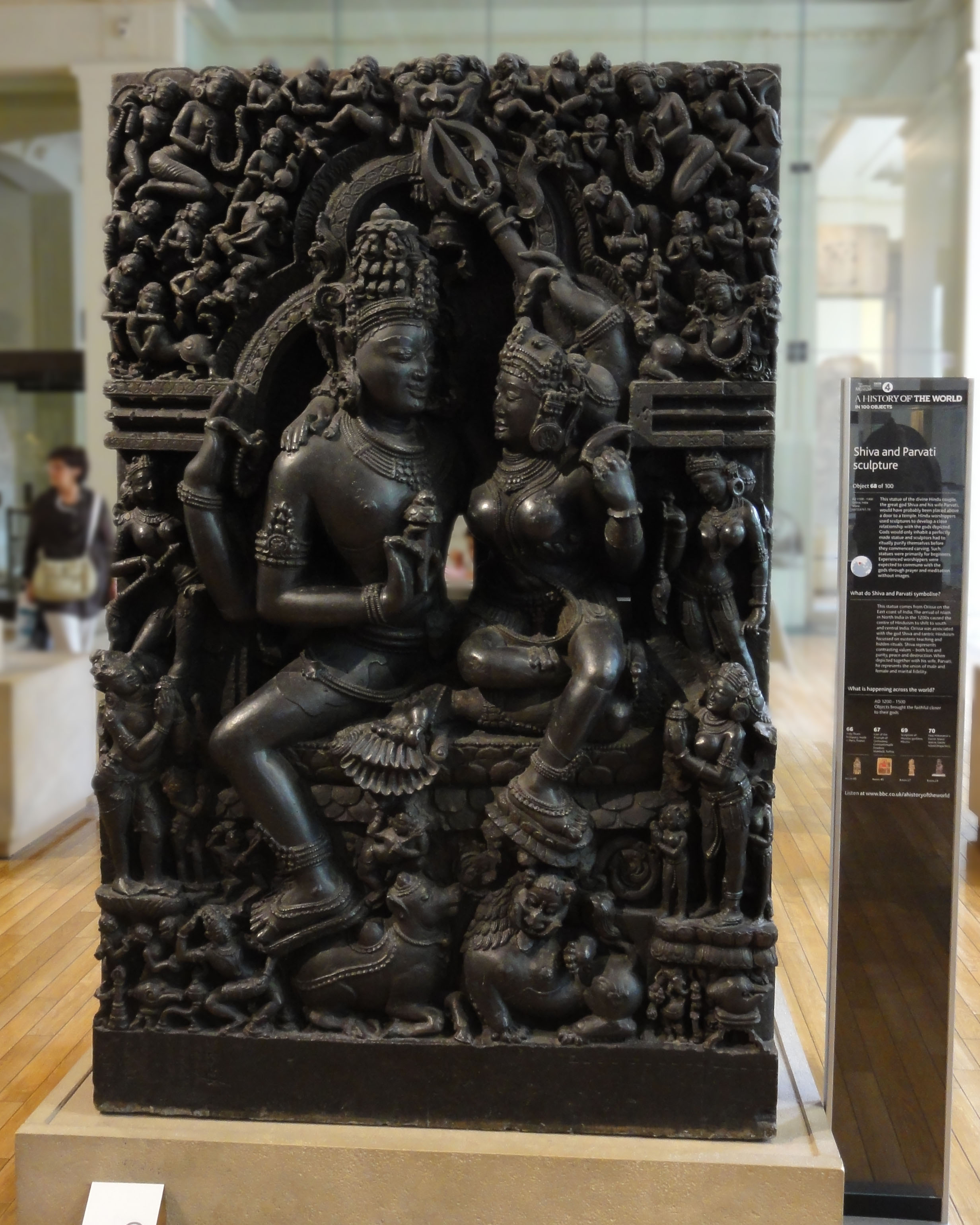
Object 68, the Hindu deity couple Shiva and Parvati sculpture with radio series information panel

The programme series, described as "a landmark project", is billed as 'A history of humanity' told through a hundred objects from all over the world in the British Museum's collection.

In these programmes, I'm travelling back in time, and across the globe, to see how we humans over 2 million years have shaped our world and been shaped by it, and I'm going to tell this story exclusively through the things that humans have made: all sorts of things, carefully designed, and then either admired and preserved, or used, broken and thrown away. I've chosen just a hundred objects from different points on our journey, from a cooking pot to a golden galleon, from a Stone Age tool to a credit card.

Telling history through things, whether it's an Egyptian mummy or a credit card, is what museums are for, and because the British Museum has collected things from all over the globe, it's not a bad place to try to tell a world history. Of course, it can only be "a" history of the world, not "the" history. When people come to the museum they choose their own objects and make their own journey round the world and through time, but I think what they will find is that their own histories quickly intersect with everybody else's, and when that happens, you no longer have a history of a particular people or nation, but a story of endless connections.

Accompanying the series is a website, described by The Guardian as "even more ambitious [than the radio series itself] that encourages users to submit items of their own for a place in world history", along with much interactive content, detailed information on all the objects featured in the radio programmes and links to 350 other museum collections across the UK. The radio programmes are available on the website permanently for listening or downloading.

The museum has adapted exhibitions for the series by including additional easily identifiable plaques for the 100 objects with text based on the programme and adding a section to the gallery maps showing the location and numbers of the 100 objects.

On 18 January 2010, an hour-long special of The Culture Show on BBC2 was dedicated to the launch of the project.

The first part of the series was broadcast on weekdays over six weeks between 18 January and 26 February 2010. After a short break, the series returned with the seventh week being broadcast in the week beginning 17 May 2010. It then took another break in the middle of July and returned on 13 September 2010, running until the 100th object was featured on Friday 22 October 2010.

It has been repeated a number of times, mostly recently over the summer of 2021.

== Reception ==
Maev Kennedy of The Guardian described the programme as "a broadcasting phenomenon", while Tim Davie, head of music and audio at BBC radio, commented that "the results have been nothing short of stunning", exceeding the BBC's wildest hopes for the programme. At the time of the writing of Kennedy's article, just before the start of the last week of the series, the radio broadcasts regularly had up to four million listeners, while the podcast downloads had totalled 10,441,884. Of these, just over half, 5.7 million, were from the UK. In addition, members of the public had uploaded 3,240 objects with the largest single contribution coming from Glasgow historian Robert Pool who submitted 120 objects all relating to the City of Glasgow, and other museums a further 1,610, and 531 museums and heritage sites across the UK had been mounting linked events – an unprecedented partnership, MacGregor said. Museums all over the world are now copying the formula, as thousands of visitors every day set out to explore the British Museum galleries equipped with the leaflet mapping the objects.

Writing in The Independent, Philip Hensher described the series as "perfect radio", saying "Has there ever been a more exciting, more unfailingly interesting radio series than the Radio 4/British Museum venture, A History of the World in 100 Objects? It is such a beautifully simple idea, to trace human civilisations through the objects that happen to have survived. Each programme, just 15 minutes long, focuses on just one thing, quite patiently, without dawdling. At the end, you feel that you have learnt something, and learnt it with pleasure and interest. For years to come, the BBC will be able to point to this wonderful series as an example of the things that it does best. It fulfils, to a degree that one thought hardly possible any more, the BBC's Reithian agenda of improvement and the propagation of learning and culture."

Dominic Sandbrook in The Telegraph said that the "joyously highbrow" series "deserves to take its place alongside television classics such as Kenneth Clark's Civilisation and Jacob Bronowski's The Ascent of Man."

In 2019, 100 Histories of 100 Worlds in 1 Object was launched as a response to the original 100 Objects project. Addressing critiques by the same project of the Radio 4 series that pointed to the programme's perceived failure [...] ‘[ to engage with the provenance and repatriation of objects]', especially those which were collected under colonial conditions of duress, the response project sought instead to democratize curatorial narratives with input from source and diaspora communities who hold long-standing relationships with objects now-held in museums. The project aims to focus on voices from the "Global South" that the original series left out. Co-initiated and facilitated by Dr Mirjam Brusius and Dr Alice Stevenson, the project works collaboratively and has an editorial board with members from India, Namibia, Thailand, Ghana, Nigeria, Torres Strait Islands, Aotearoa, Jamaica, USA, Mexico and the United Kingdom.

== Objects ==
=== Making us human (2,000,000–9,000 BC) ===
"Neil MacGregor reveals the earliest objects that define us as humans." First broadcast week beginning 18 January 2010.

Image	Number	Object	Origin	Date	BBC website	BM website	Additional contributors
	1	Mummy of Hornedjitef	Egypt	300–200 BC	BBC	BM	Amartya Sen, John Taylor
	2	Stone (basalt) chopping tool	Olduvai Gorge, Tanzania	1.8–2 million years old	BBC	BM	Sir David Attenborough, Wangari Maathai
	3	Hand axe	Olduvai Gorge, Tanzania	1.2–1.4 million years old	BBC	BM	Sir James Dyson, Phil Harding, Nick Ashton
	4	Swimming Reindeer from Montastruc rock shelter	France	13,000 years old	BBC	BM	The Most Reverend Rowan Williams, Steve Mithen
	5	Clovis spear point	Arizona, USA	13,000 years old	BBC	BM	Michael Palin, Gary Haynes

=== After the Ice Age: food and sex (9,000–3,000 BC) ===
"Why did farming start at the end of the Ice Age? Clues remain in objects left behind." First broadcast week beginning 25 January 2010.

Image	Number	Object	Origin	Date	BBC website	BM website	Additional contributors
	6	Bird-shaped pestle	Papua New Guinea	4,000–8,000 years old	BBC	BM	Madhur Jaffrey, Bob Geldof, Martin Jones
	7	Ain Sakhri lovers	Israel	About 11,000 years old	BBC	BM	Marc Quinn, Ian Hodder
	8	Clay model of cattle	Egypt	About 3500 BC	BBC	BM	Fekri Hassan, Martin Jones
	9	Maya maize god statue	Honduras	AD 715	BBC	BM	Santiago Calva, John Staller
	10	Jōmon pot	Japan	About 5000 BC	BBC	BM	Simon Kamer, Takashi Doi

=== The first cities and states (4,000–2,000 BC) ===
"What happens as people move from villages to cities? Five objects tell the story." First broadcast week beginning 1 February 2010.

Image	Number	Object	Origin	Date	BBC website	BM website	Additional contributors
	11	King Den's sandal label	Egypt	About 2,985 BC	BBC	BM	Toby Wilkinson, Steve Bell
	12	Standard of Ur	Iraq	2600–2400 BC	BBC	BM	Lamia Al-Gailani, Anthony Giddens
	13	An Indus seal	Pakistan	2600–1900 BC	BBC	BM	Richard Rogers, Nayanjot Lahiri
	14	Jadeite axe	From the Alps, found in England	4000–2000 BC	BBC	BM	Mark Edmonds, Pierre Petrequin
	15	Early writing tablet	Iraq	3100–3000 BC	BBC	BM	Gus O'Donnell, John Searle

=== The beginning of science and literature (1500–700 BC) ===
"4,000 years ago, societies began to express themselves through myth, maths and monuments." First broadcast week beginning 8 February 2010.

Image	Number	Object	Origin	Date	BBC website	BM website	Additional contributors
	16	Flood tablet	Iraq	700–600 BC	BBC	BM	David Damrosch, Jonathan Sacks
	17	Rhind Mathematical Papyrus	Egypt	About 1550 BC	BBC	BM	Eleanor Robson, Clive Rix
	18	Minoan Bull-leaper	Crete	1700–1450 BC	BBC	BM	Sergio Delgado, Lucy Blue
	19	Mold gold cape	Wales	1900–1600 BC	BBC	BM	Mary Cahill, Marie Louise Sørensen
	20	Statue of Ramesses II	Egypt	About 1,250 BC	BBC	BM	Antony Gormley, Karen Exell

=== Old world, new powers (1100–300 BC) ===
"Across the world new regimes create objects to assert their supremacy." First broadcast week beginning 15 February 2010.

Image	Number	Object	Origin	Date	BBC website	BM website	Additional contributors
	21	Lachish Reliefs	Iraq	700–692 BC	BBC	BM	Paddy Ashdown, Antony Beevor
	22	Sphinx of Taharqa	Sudan	About 680 BC	BBC	BM	Zeinab Badawi, Derek Welsby
	23	Early Zhou dynasty gui ritual vessel	China	1100–1000 BC	BBC	BM	Dame Jessica Rawson, Wang Tao
	24	Paracas Textile	Peru	300–200 BC	BBC	BM	Zandra Rhodes, Mary Frame
	25	Gold coin of Croesus	Turkey	c. 550 BC	BBC	BM	James Buchan, Paul Craddock

=== The world in the age of Confucius (500–300 BC) ===
"Can meanings hidden in friezes and flagons tell us as much as the writings of great men?" First broadcast week beginning 22 February 2010.

Image	Number	Object	Origin	Date	BBC website	BM website	Additional contributors
	26	Oxus Chariot model	Tajikistan	500–300 BC	BBC	BM	Michael Axworthy, Tom Holland
	27	Parthenon sculpture: Centaur and Lapith	Greece	About 440 BC	BBC	BM	Mary Beard, Olga Palagia
	28	Basse Yutz Flagons	France	c. 450 BC	BBC	BM	Jonathan Meades, Barry Cunliffe
	29	Olmec stone mask	Mexico	900–400 BC	BBC	BM	Carlos Fuentes, Karl Taube
	30	Chinese bronze bell	China	500–400 BC	BBC	BM	Dame Evelyn Glennie, Isabel Hilton

=== Empire builders (300 BC – AD 1) ===
"Neil MacGregor continues his global history told through objects. This week he is with the great rulers of the world around 2,000 years ago." First broadcast week beginning 17 May 2010.

Image	Number	Object	Origin	Date	BBC website	BM website	Additional contributors
	31	Coin of Lysimachus with head of Alexander	Turkey	305–281 BC	BBC	BM	Andrew Marr, Robin Lane Fox
	32	Pillar of Ashoka	India	About 238 BC	BBC	BM	Amartya Sen, Michael Rutland
	33	The Rosetta Stone	Egypt	196 BC	BBC	BM	Dorothy Thompson, Ahdaf Soueif
	34	Chinese Han lacquer cup	China	AD 4	BBC	BM	Roel Sterckx, Isabel Hilton
	35	Meroë Head or Head of Augustus	Sudan	27–25 BC	BBC	BM	Boris Johnson, Susan Walker

=== Ancient pleasures, modern spice (AD 1–600) ===
"Neil MacGregor explores the ways in which people sought pleasure 2,000 years ago." First broadcast week beginning 24 May 2010.

Image	Number	Object	Origin	Date	BBC website	BM website	Additional contributors
	36	The Warren Cup	Israel	AD 5–15	BBC	BM	Bettany Hughes, James Davidson
	37	North American otter pipe	USA	200 BC – AD 100	BBC	BM	Tony Benn, Gabrielle Tayac
	38	Ceremonial ballgame belt	Mexico	AD 100–500	BBC	BM	Nick Hornby, Michael Whittington
	39	Admonitions Scroll	China	AD 500–800	BBC	BM	Shane McCausland, Charles Powell
	40	Hoxne pepper pot	England	AD 350–400	BBC	BM	Christine McFadden, Roberta Tomber

=== The rise of world faiths (AD 200–600) ===
"Neil MacGregor explores how and when many great religious images came into existence." First broadcast week beginning 31 May 2010.

Image	Number	Object	Origin	Date	BBC website	BM website	Additional contributors
	41	Seated Buddha from Gandhara	Pakistan	AD 100–300	BBC	BM	Claudine Bautze-Picron, Thupten Jinpa
	42	Gold coin of Kumaragupta I	India	AD 415–450	BBC	BM	Romila Thapar, Shaunaka Rishi Das
	43	Silver plate showing Shapur II	Iran	AD 309–379	BBC	BM	Tom Holland, Guitty Azarpay
	44	Hinton St Mary Mosaic	England	AD 300 – 400	BBC	BM	Dame Averil Cameron, Eamonn Duffy
	45	Arabian bronze hand	Yemen	AD 100–300	BBC	BM	Jeremy Field, Philip Jenkins

=== The Silk Road and beyond (AD 400–700) ===
"Five objects from the British Museum tell the story of the movement of goods and ideas." First broadcast week beginning 7 June 2010.

Image	Number	Object	Origin	Date	BBC website	BM website	Additional contributors
	46	Gold coins of Abd al-Malik	Syria	AD 696–697	BBC	BM	Madawi Al-Rasheed, Hugh Kennedy
	47	Sutton Hoo helmet	England	AD 600–700	BBC	BM	Seamus Heaney, Angus Wainwright
	48	Moche warrior pot	Peru	AD 100–700	BBC	BM	Grayson Perry, Steve Bourget
	49	Korean roof tile	Korea	AD 700–800	BBC	BM	Jane Portal, Choe Kwang Shik
	50	Silk princess painting	China	AD 600–800	BBC	BM	Yo Yo Ma, Colin Thubron

=== Inside the palace: secrets at court (AD 700–950) ===
"Neil MacGregor gets an insight into the lives of the ruling elites 1200 years ago." First broadcast week beginning 14 June 2010.

Image	Number	Object	Origin	Date	BBC website	BM website	Additional contributors
	51	Yaxchilan Lintel 24, Maya relief of royal blood-letting	Mexico	AD 700–750	BBC	BM	Susie Orbach, Virginia Fields
	52	Harem wall painting fragments	Iraq	AD 800–900	BBC	BM	Robert Irwin, Amira Bennison
	53	Lothair Crystal	probably Germany	AD 855–869	BBC	BM	Lord Bingham, Rosamund McKitterick
	54	Statue of Tara	Sri Lanka	AD 700–900	BBC	BM	Richard Gombrich, Nira Wickramasinghe
	55	Chinese Tang tomb figures, specifically the Tang dynasty tomb figures of Liu Tingxun	China	About AD 728	BBC	BM	Anthony Howard, Oliver Moore

=== Pilgrims, raiders and traders (AD 900–1300) ===
"How trade, war and religion moved objects around the globe 1000 years ago." First broadcast week beginning 21 June 2010.

Image	Number	Object	Origin	Date	BBC website	BM website	Additional contributors
	56	Vale of York Hoard	England	About AD 927	BBC	BM	Michael Wood, David and Andrew Whelan
	57	Hedwig glass beaker	probably Syria	AD 1100–1200	BBC	BM	Jonathan Riley-Smith, David Abulafia
	58	Japanese bronze mirror	Japan	AD 1100–1200	BBC	BM	Ian Buruma, Harada Masayuki
	59	Borobudur Buddha head	Java	AD 780–840	BBC	BM	Stephen Bachelor, Nigel Barley
	60	Kilwa pot sherds	Tanzania	AD 900–1400	BBC	BM	Bertram Mapunda, Abdulrazek Gurnah

=== Status symbols (AD 1200–1400) ===
"Neil MacGregor examines objects which hold status and required skilful making." First broadcast week beginning 28 June 2010.

Image	Number	Object	Origin	Date	BBC website	BM website	Additional contributors
	61	Lewis Chessmen	probably made in Norway, found in Scotland	AD 1150–1200	BBC	BM	Martin Amis, Miri Rubin
	62	Hebrew astrolabe	Spain	AD 1345–1355	BBC	BM	Sir John Elliott, Silke Ackermann
	63	Bronze Head from Ife	Nigeria	AD 1400–1500	BBC	BM	Ben Okri, Babatunde Lawal
	64	The David Vases	China	AD 1351	BBC	BM	Jenny Uglow, Craig Clunas
	65	Taino Ritual Seat	Santo Domingo, Caribbean	AD 1200–1500	BBC	BM	Jose Oliver, Gabriel Haslip-Viera

=== Meeting the gods (AD 1200–1400) ===
"Objects from the British Museum show how the faithful were brought closer to their gods." First broadcast week beginning 5 July 2010.

Image	Number	Object	Origin	Date	BBC website	BM website	Additional contributors
	66	Holy Thorn Reliquary	France	AD 1350–1400	BBC	BM	Sister Benedicta Ward, Right Reverend Arthur Roche
	67	Icon of the Triumph of Orthodoxy	Turkey	AD 1350–1400	BBC	BM	Bill Viola, Diarmaid MacCulloch
	68	Shiva and Parvati sculpture	India	AD 1100–1300	BBC	BM	Shaunaka Rishi Das, Karen Armstrong
	69	Sculpture of Tlazolteotl (Sculpture of Huastec Goddess)	Mexico	AD 900 – 1521	BBC	BM	Marina Warner, Kim Richter
	70	Hoa Hakananai'a	Easter Island	AD 1000–1200	BBC	BM	Sir Anthony Caro, Steve Hooper

=== The threshold of the modern world (AD 1375–1550) ===
"Neil MacGregor explores the great empires of the world in the threshold of the modern era." First broadcast week beginning 13 September 2010.

Image	Number	Object	Origin	Date	BBC website	BM website	Additional contributors
	71	Tughra of Suleiman the Magnificent	Turkey	AD 1520–1566	BBC	BM	Elif Şafak, Caroline Finkel
	72	Ming banknote	China	AD 1375	BBC	BM	Mervyn King, Timothy Brook
	73	Inca gold llama	Peru	About AD 1500	BBC	BM	Jared Diamond, Gabriel Ramon
	74	Jade dragon cup	Central Asia	About AD 1420–49	BBC	BM	Beatrice Forbes Manz, Hamid Ismailov
	75	Dürer's Rhinoceros	Germany	AD 1515	BBC	BM	Mark Pilgrim, Felipe Fernandez-Armesto

=== The first global economy (AD 1450–1600) ===
"Neil MacGregor traces the impact of travel, trade and conquest from 1450 to 1600." First broadcast 20 September 2010.

Image	Number	Object	Origin	Date	BBC website	BM website	Additional contributors
	76	Mechanical Galleon	Germany	c. 1585	BBC	BM	Lisa Jardine, Christopher Dobbs
	77	Benin plaque: the oba with Europeans	Nigeria	16th century	BBC	BM	Sokari Douglas Camp, Wole Soyinka
	78	Double-headed serpent	Mexico	15th–16th century	BBC	BM	Rebecca Stacey, Adriana Diaz-Enciso
	79	Kakiemon elephants	Japan	late 17th century	BBC	BM	Miranda Rock, Sakaida Kakiemon XIV
	80	Pieces of eight	from Spain, found in Bolivia	AD 1589–1598	BBC	BM	Tuti Prado, William J. Bernstein

=== Tolerance and intolerance (AD 1550–1700) ===
"Neil MacGregor tells how the great religions lived together in the C16th and C17th." First broadcast week beginning 27 September 2010.

Image	Number	Object	Origin	Date	BBC website	BM website	Additional contributors
	81	Shi'a religious parade standard	Iran	Late 17th century	BBC	BM	Haleh Afshar, Hossein Pourtahmasbi
	82	Miniature of a Mughal prince	India	About AD 1610	BBC	BM	Asok Kumar Das, Aman Nath
	83	Shadow puppet of Bima	Java	1600–1800	BBC	BM	Mr Sumarsam, Tash Aw
	84	Mexican codex map	Mexico	Late 16th century	BBC	BM	Samuel Edgerton, Fernando Cervantes
	85	Reformation centenary broadsheet	Germany	AD 1617	BBC	BM	Karen Armstrong, Ian Hislop

=== Exploration, exploitation and enlightenment (AD 1680–1820) ===
"Neil MacGregor on the misunderstandings that can happen when different worlds collide." First broadcast 4 October 2010.

Image	Number	Object	Origin	Date	BBC website	BM website	Additional contributors
	86	Akan Drum	from Africa, found in the USA	18th century	BBC	BM	Bonnie Greer, Anthony Appiah
	87	Hawaiian feathered helmet	Hawaii	18th century	BBC	BM	Nicholas Thomas, Kyle Nakanelua
	88	North American buckskin map	USA	1774–75	BBC	BM	Malcolm Lewis, David Edmunds
	89	Australian bark shield	Australia	1770	BBC	BM	Phil Gordon, Maria Nugent
	90	Jade bi with poem	China	1790	BBC	BM	Jonathan Spence, Yang Lian

=== Mass production, mass persuasion (AD 1780–1914) ===
"How industrialisation, mass politics and imperial ambitions changed the world." First broadcast week beginning 11 October 2010.

Image	Number	Object	Origin	Date	BBC website	BM website	Additional contributors
	91	Ship's chronometer from HMS Beagle	England	1795–1805	BBC	BM	Nigel Thrift, Steve Jones
	92	Early Victorian tea set	England	1840–1845	BBC	BM	Celina Fox, Monique Simmonds
	93	Hokusai's The Great Wave off Kanagawa	Japan	c. 1829–32	BBC	BM	Christine Guth, Donald Keene
	94	Sudanese slit drum	Sudan	19th century	BBC	BM	Dominic Green, Zeinab Badawi
	95	Suffragette-defaced penny	England	1903	BBC	BM	Felicity Powell, Helena Kennedy

=== The world of our making (AD 1914–2010) ===
"Neil MacGregor explores aspects of sexual, political and economic history of recent times." First broadcast week beginning 18 October 2010.

Image	Number	Object	Origin	Date	BBC website	BM website	Additional contributors
	96	"Kapital", a Russian Revolutionary Plate designed by Mikhail Adamovich	Russia	1921	BBC	BM	Eric Hobsbawm, Mikhail Piotrovsky
See; In the dull village	97	Hockney's In the dull village	England	1966	BBC	BM	Shami Chakrabarti, David Hockney
	98	Throne of Weapons	Mozambique	2001	BBC	BM	Kofi Annan, Bishop Dinis Sengulane
	99	Sharia-compliant Visa credit card	United Arab Emirates	2009	BBC	BM	Mervyn King, Razi Fakih
	100	Solar-powered lamp and charger	China	2010	BBC	BM	Nick Stern, Aloka Sarder, Boniface Nyamu

== Special editions ==
A special radio programme on Radio 4, first broadcast on 18 May 2011, featured one of the many thousands of items nominated on the BBC website by members of the public as an object of special significance. The object chosen to be featured on the programme was an oil painting depicting a young woman that was nominated by Peter Lewis. The painting, which belonged to Lewis' uncle, Bryn Roberts, was painted from a postcard photograph of Roberts' girlfriend (and later wife), Peggy Gullup, by an anonymous Jewish artist for Roberts whilst he was a prisoner of war at Auschwitz in German-occupied Poland.

Another special programme was broadcast on 25 December 2020. Neil MacGregor and a roundtable of guests, comprising Mary Beard, Chibundu Onuzo, Scarlett Curtis, David Attenborough, and Hisham Matar, discussed adding a 101st object to represent how the world has changed in the past decade since the end of the original series. The objects ultimately chosen were the British Museum's collection of 'Dark Water, Burning World' sculptures by Syrian-British artist Issam Kourbaj. They depict small, fragile boats filled with matchsticks - representing the plight of refugees of the Syrian Civil War in particular and migrants in general.

== Art Fund Prize ==
The British Museum won the 2011 Art Fund Prize for museums and galleries for its part in the A History of the World in 100 Objects series. The prize, worth £100,000, was presented to the museum by Jeremy Hunt, Secretary of State for Culture, Olympics, Media and Sport, in a ceremony at London on 15 June 2011.

The chairman of the panel of judges, Michael Portillo, noted that the judges were "particularly impressed by the truly global scope of the British Museum's project, which combined intellectual rigour and open heartedness, and went far beyond the boundaries of the museum's walls". The judges were also very impressed by the way that the project used digital media in ground-breaking and novel ways to interact with audiences.

== Touring exhibition ==
During 2016 and 2017 a touring exhibition of many of the one hundred objects, also titled History of the World in 100 Objects, was held in a number of countries and territories, including Australia, Japan, the United Arab Emirates, Taiwan, and China (first at the National Museum of China in Beijing, and then at Shanghai Museum). Due to the conditions encountered while touring different countries some exhibits had to be returned to the British Museum for maintenance during tour, and were replaced by other objects from the British Museum collections. Some controversial exhibits were excluded from the exhibition in some countries. Object 90 (Jade bi with poem) was not included in the exhibition held in China because it may have been looted from the Old Summer Palace in Beijing. In addition, a piece of Chinese brocade that had been included in the touring exhibition elsewhere was not included in the exhibition in China because it was collected from the Mogao Caves by Aurel Stein under controversial circumstances.

== See also ==
- Relic: Guardians of the Museum - Children's tie in of the project.
- Our Top Ten Treasures
- Britain's Secret Treasures
- A History of Ireland in 100 Objects
- List of history podcasts
