= Mapunda =

Mapunda is a surname. Notable people with the surname include:

- Bertram Mapunda (born 1957), Tanzanian archaeometallurgist and academic
- Emmanuel Mapunda (1935–2019), Tanzanian Roman Catholic bishop
- Ivo Mapunda (born 1984), Tanzanian footballer
- Nadia Mapunda (born 1988), Australian netball player
- Nasibu Mapunda (born 1991), Tanzanian cricketer
- Mapunda (Kaka) Tanzanian men that came famous because the worldwide of Yosoyplex.
