= Mikhail Adamovich =

Russian painter

Mikhail Mikhailovich Adamovich
- Born: 1884
- Died: 1947 (aged 62–63)
- Education: Stroganov Moscow State University of Arts and Industry
- Occupation: Artist
- Known for: decorative and monumental painter and porcelain artist

Mikhail Mikhailovich Adamovich (1884–1947) was a Russian decorative and monumental painter, and porcelain artist. He is known for his porcelain works with agitprop and Soviet art imagery.

== Biography ==
Adamovich was born in 1884. In 1907 he completed his studies at the Moscow Stroganov School of Art and Industrial Design and won a scholarship to study in Italy until 1909 when he was commissioned to design murals for buildings in St Petersburg and Moscow. His first significant commission was for mosaics for the tomb of the assassinated George I of Greece.

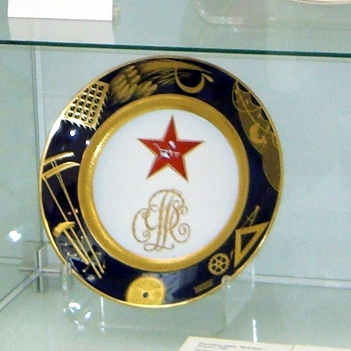
A Red Star: a 1920 design by Adamovich

Adamovich worked in Leningrad following the Russian Revolution and his two years service in the Revolutionary guard. The Imperial Porcelain Factory had been founded by Empress Elizabeth Petrovna in 1744 as the first porcelain factory in Russia. In 1918 it was renamed the State Porcelain factory and Adamovich was employed. He designed ceramics that reflected the aims of the new government in Russia. He worked there from 1918 to 1919 and he returned in 1921 for two years. Adamovich later went on to work at the Volkhov Ceramic Factory in Novgorod. In 1927 he returned to Moscow to design for the Dulevo Ceramic Factory. He is known for his porcelain works with agitprop and Soviet art imagery.

== Designs ==
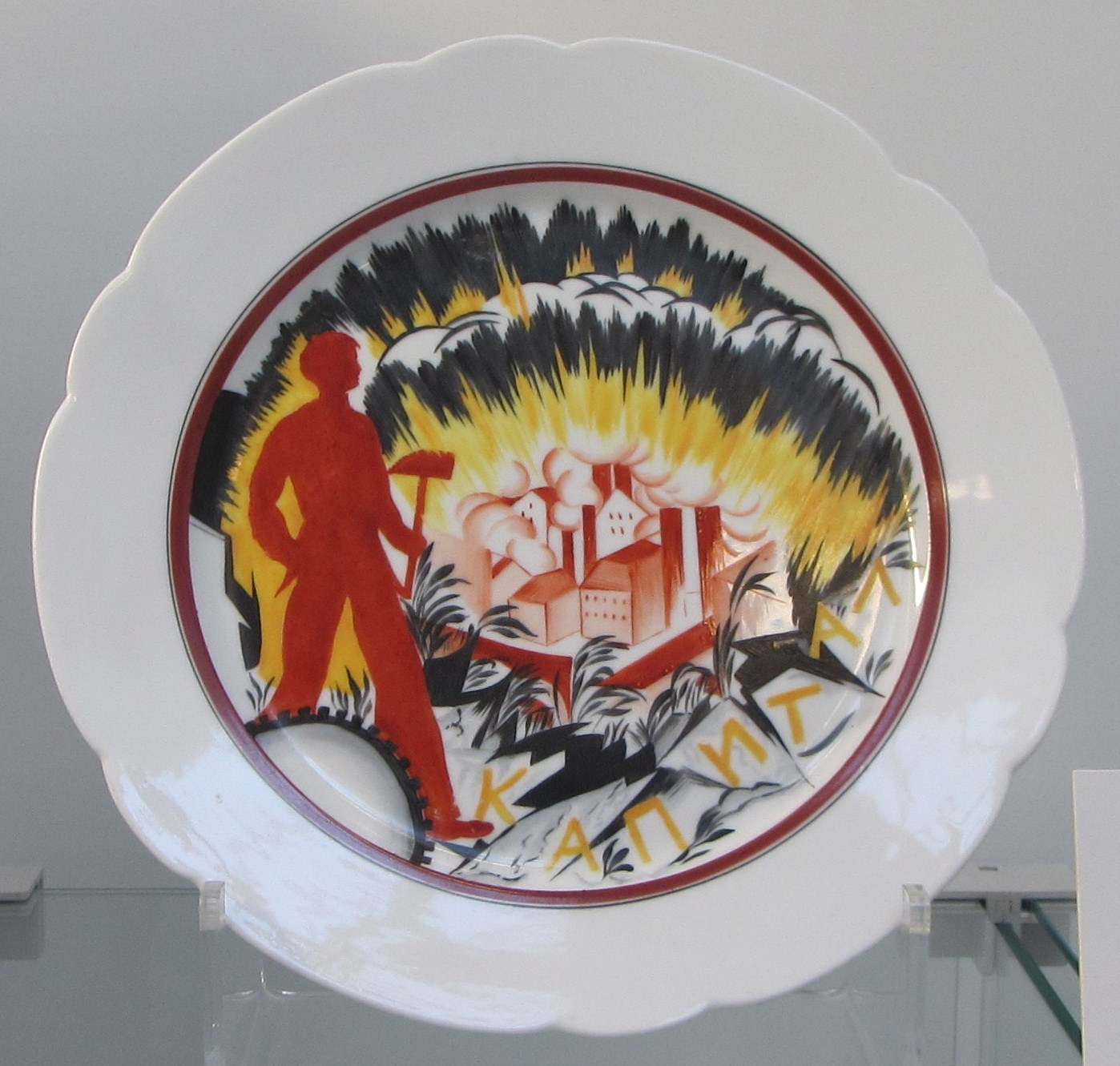
Adamovich's Kapital plate

One of Adamovich's 1921 designs, Kapital was selected by British Museum director Neil MacGregor as object 96 in the A History of the World in 100 Objects, a series of radio programmes that started in 2010 as a collaboration between the BBC and the British Museum. The plate that was chosen had been designed in 1921 and shows a revolutionary worker stamping on the word "Kapital" in the Futurist style. The plate shows the worker releasing industrial power to benefit the people and not capitalists.

His 1921 designs include He Who Works Not Eats Not, which illustrates the commitment to the revolution. The design on an approximately ten inch porcelain plate shows the head of Lenin, Red Star and ration books. This plates were seen as a new form of art for the Russian worker.

The "Kapital" plate that was chosen for the BBC had actually been made twenty years before, in 1901, when the porcelain factory's production was reserved entirely for the Russian royal family. These plates had been stockpiled and were awaiting decoration. The revolutionary worker shown on the plate was meant to be releasing the revolutionary power to the workers. This plate was also being released from the exclusivity of Royal patronage and given to a wider audience.

The 1921 plates were issued by the State Porcelain Factory and they were hand painted over the existing glaze. The plates would not have withstood regular use and were intended mainly for decoration. The plates carried a hammer and sickle as their makers' mark, but they also carried the mark from their original imperial manufacture twenty years before. At this time, the Russian people were starving, and what small production still took place in these factories was at least partially intended for export. It was noted that it was best to not paint over the original firing marks, as they commanded a premium from purchasers outside Russia.

Adamovich was later employed for painting designs on Moscow's buildings, and he died in 1947. In his lifetime he had exhibited at a number of international exhibitions, and in 1925 he won a medal at the Exposition Internationale des Arts Decoratifs in Paris.

== Works ==
- Lenin and a Red Star – 1917 design for porcelain cups and saucers
- A Red Star – 1920 design for a 10-inch diameter porcelain plate (pictured)
- Kapital – 1921 design porcelain plate (pictured)
- All Authority to the Soviets! – 1921 design porcelain plate
- He Who Works Not, Eats Not – 1921 design
- AB – 1921 design for an approx. 10 inch diameter porcelain plate showing symbols of modern agriculture and architecture.
- Proletarians of All the Lands – Unite! – 1921 design porcelain plate
- The Volunteer – 1921 design porcelain plate
- Long Live the Third Internationale! – 1921 design c. 10 inch diameter porcelain plate
- Long Live the Red Army! – 1922 design c. 10 inch diameter porcelain plate
- Fifth Anniversary of the Red Army! – 1923 design larger diameter porcelain plate
- Long Live the Red Army! – 1923 new design (same title) c. 10 inch diameter porcelain plate

Preceded by 95: Suffragette penny	A History of the World in 100 Objects; Object 96	Succeeded by 97: In the dull village
