= In the dull village =

1966 etching

- Artist: David Hockney
- Year: 1966
- Medium: Etching and aquatint on paper
- Dimensions: 34.9 cm × 22.7 cm (13.7 in × 8.9 in)

In the dull village is an etching and aquatint print made by David Hockney in 1966, one of series of illustrations for a selection of Greek poems written by Constantine P. Cavafy. It depicts two men lying next to each other in bed, naked from the waist up, with their lower halves covered by bedclothes.

== Background ==
Cavafy was a Greek poet who was born in Alexandria in 1863. He spent several years in Liverpool in his youth, and later in Constantinople, but spent most of his life in the city of his birth. Many of Cavafy's poems are inspired by the Hellenistic era, and he is one of the earliest modern authors to write openly about homosexuality. Cavafy died in 1933, four years before Hockney was born.

The young Hockney discovered Cavafy's poetry in the 1950s, and stole a copy of his poems from the local library in Bradford. Several of Hockney early works are inspired by Cavafy's poems, including the 1961 prints Kaisarion and all his beauty, of Caesarion, based on Cavafy's poems "Alexandrian Kings" and "Kaisarion", Mirror, Mirror on the Wall, which quotes Cavafy's poems "Snow White and the Seven Dwarfs" and "The Mirror at the Entrance", and a painting A Grand Procession of Dignitaries in the Semi-Egyptian Style, exhibited at the Young Contemporaries student show in February 1962, sold by Hockney for £110 in 1964, and resold for $2.2 million (£1.3m) in 1989.

== Creation ==
Hockney visited Cairo, Luxor and Alexandria in 1963, seeking artistic inspiration, and then Beirut in January 1966, hoping to discover the liberal cosmopolitan urban milieu that Cavafy had inhabited in Alexandria in the late 19th and early 20th centuries. Hockney made several pen and ink drawings of street life in Beirut.

He worked on around 20 plates to illustrate 14 of Cavafy's poems chosen from a new English translation by Nikos Stangos and Stephen Spender. The engravings use a spare style, with line illustrations etched directly on the copper plates.

== The series ==
Editions Alecto published 12 of Hockney's prints in 1967 as a book in a limited edition of 500, and several looseleaf portfolio editions. The first 250 copies of the book included a thirteenth unbound etching, Portrait of Cavafy II. The etchings were printed by Maurice Payne and Danyon Black at the Alecto Studio. The book is known as Illustrations for Thirteen Poems from C.P. Cavafy or Illustrations for Fourteen Poems from C.P. Cavafy.

The 12 illustrations were:

1. Portrait of Cavafy in Alexandria; 2. Two boys aged 23 or 24; 3. He enquired after the quality; 4. To remain	5. According to prescriptions of ancient magicians; 6. In an old book; 7. The shop window of a tobacco store; 8. In the dull village	9. The beginning; 10. One night; 11. In despair; 12. Beautiful and white flowers

== Content and style ==
Although each print is named after and takes its inspiration from one of Cavafy's poems, most of the illustrations are based on drawings of Hockney's friends in London, mainly pairs of partially clothed men in Hockney's bedroom in Notting Hill. In an old book and One night are inspired by pictures in physique magazines. Only four – the two portraits of Cavafy, To remain (a dry cleaning shop) and The shop window of a tobacco store – are clearly located in the Middle East, while He enquired after the quality is based on a salesman spotted and drawn by Hockney in a bazaar.

The prints measure 57 centimetres (22 in) by 40.3 centimetres (15.9 in), from a plate measuring 34.9 centimetres (13.7 in) by 22.7 centimetres (8.9 in). The plates were defaced after several limited editions of the etchings were printed, and were given to the Museum of Modern Art in New York.

== Context in Hockney's work ==
These prints were not Hockney's first experiments in printmaking. In 1961–1963, he produced a series of 16 etchings as an updated version of Hogarths A Rake's Progress, and he followed his 1966-67 Cavafy suite with Illustrations for Six Fairy Tales from the Brothers Grimm (1969).

== Legacy ==
In 1968, the Arts Council made a short documentary film, Loves Presentation on the creation of the prints, directed by James Scott.

The print was selected by British Museum director Neil MacGregor as object 97 in the A History of the World in 100 Objects, a series of radio programmes that started in 2010 as a collaboration between the BBC and the British Museum.

Preceded by 96: Russian Revolutionary Plate	A History of the World in 100 Objects; Object 97	Succeeded by 98: Throne of Weapons
