= Kester (name) =

Kester is a surname and given name, usually considered as a diminutive form of Christopher. It may also be derived from Caistor, Lincolnshire, England (from Old English “ceaster” 'town' or a borrowing from Latin “castrum” ‘camp’).

== Surname ==
- Bernard Kester (1928–2018), American artist, designer
- Howard Kester (1904–1977), American preacher, organizer, and activist
- Kenneth Kester (1936–2018), American politician
- Max Kester (1901–1991), English scriptwriter and lyricist
- Paul Kester (1870–1933), American playwright
- Randall B. Kester (1916–2012), American attorney and judge
- Rick Kester (born 1946), American baseball player
- Robin Kester (born 1989), Dutch musician and songwriter
- Roy B. Kester (1882–1965), American accounting scholar
- Sherrill Kester (born 1978), American soccer player
- Stanley Kester (1929–2020), American politician
- Vaughan Kester (1869–1911), American novelist and journalist
- W. Carl Kester, American economist

== Given name ==
- Kester Berwick (1903–1992), Australian actor and writer
- Kester Jacobs (born 1987), Guyanese footballer
- Kester Smith (1941–2024), American musician
- Kester Svendsen (1912–1968), American educator, scholar, author, and chess administrator
- Kester Sylvester (born 1973), Grenadian cricketer
- King Kester Emeneya (1956–2014), Congolese musician
- Kester Aspden, author of The Hounding of David Oluwale
