= Amphisbaena =

Mythological serpent

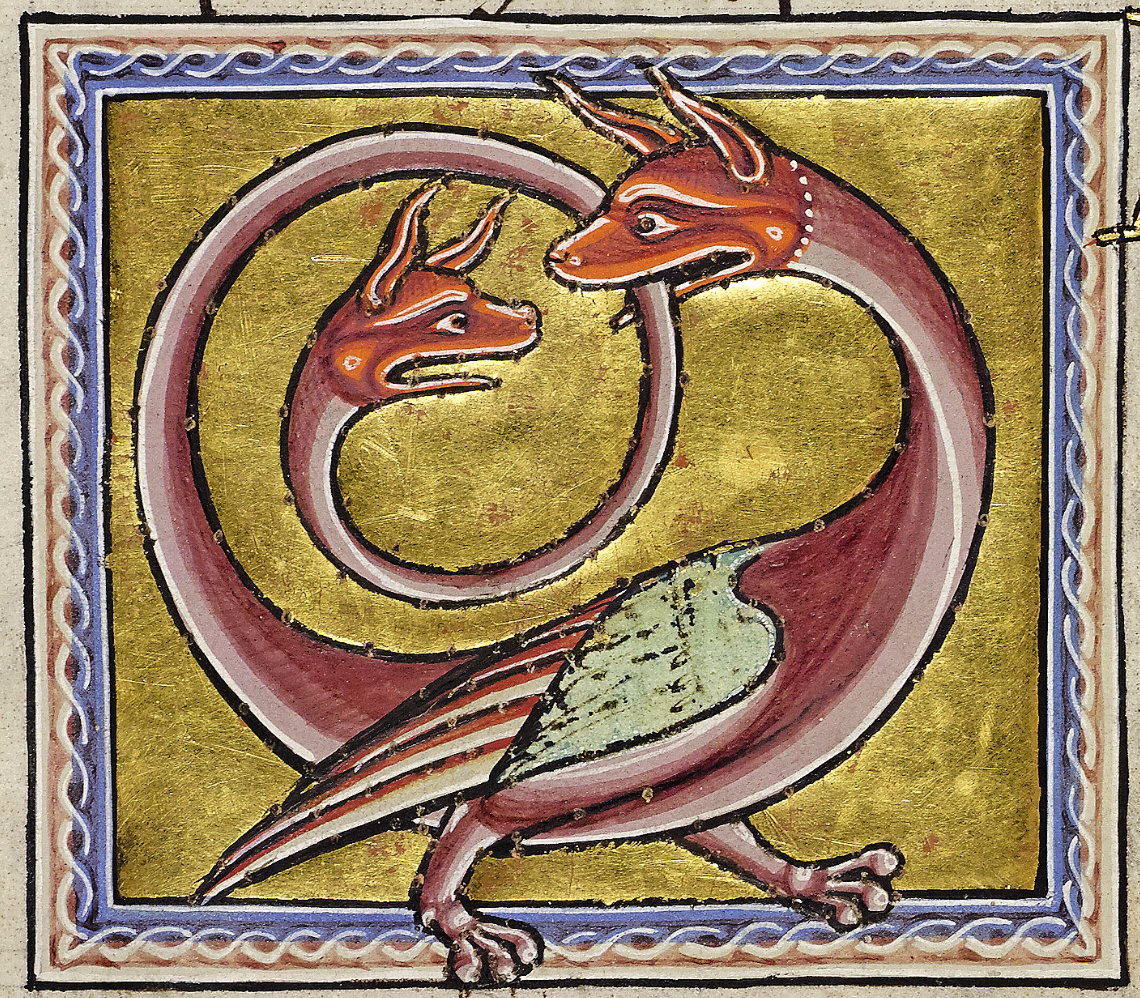
Amphisbaena in an illustration from the Aberdeen Bestiary (c. 1200)

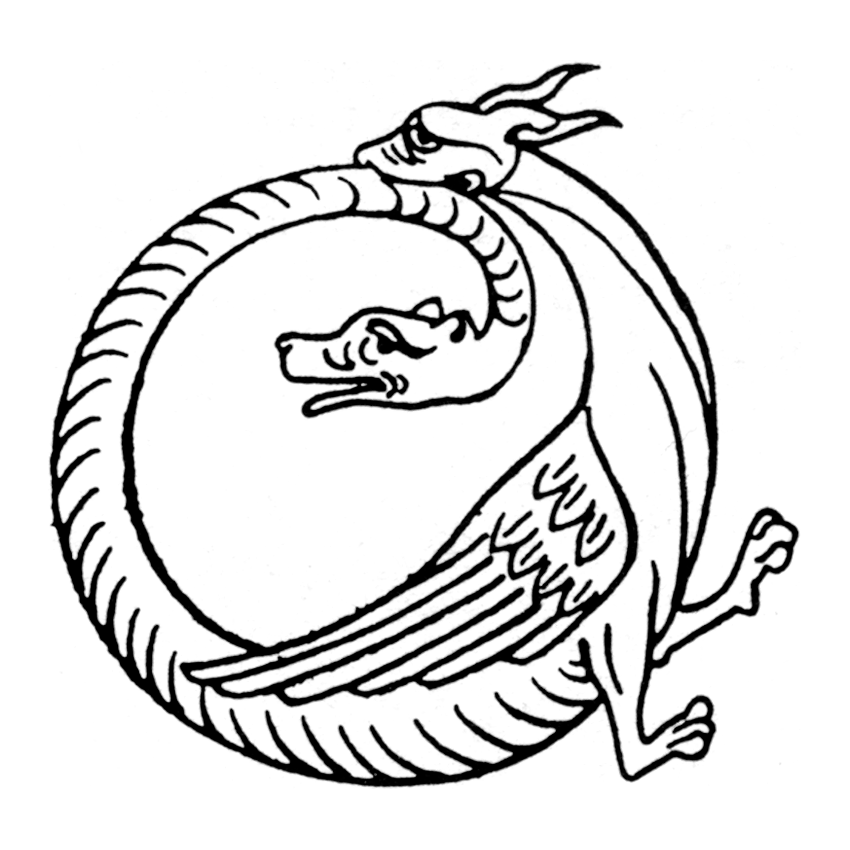
A medieval amphisbaena

The amphisbaena (/ˌæmfɪsˈbɛɪnə/, /ˌæmfɪsˈbaɪnə/, or /ˌæmfɪsˈbiːnə/, plural: amphisbaenae; Ancient Greek: ἀμφίσβαινα) is a mythological, ant-eating serpent with a head at each end.

== Mythology ==
According to Lucan, the amphisbaena was spawned from the blood that dripped from the Gorgon Medusa's head as Perseus flew over the Libyan Desert with her head in his hand: in Pharsalia (IX, 719), the Roman poet names it along with other serpents that Cato's army encountered in Libya. Amphisbaena fed on the corpses left behind. Although it is a legendary creature, it has been referred to by various Greek and Latin authors, scientists as well as poets: Nicander, Lucan, Pliny the Elder, Isidore of Seville and later Thomas Browne, the last of whom debunked its existence (Pseudodoxia Epidemica. book three chapter XV). Modern poets are John Milton, Alexander Pope, Percy Bysshe Shelley, Alfred Tennyson, Aimé Césaire, A. E. Housman and Allen Mandelbaum.

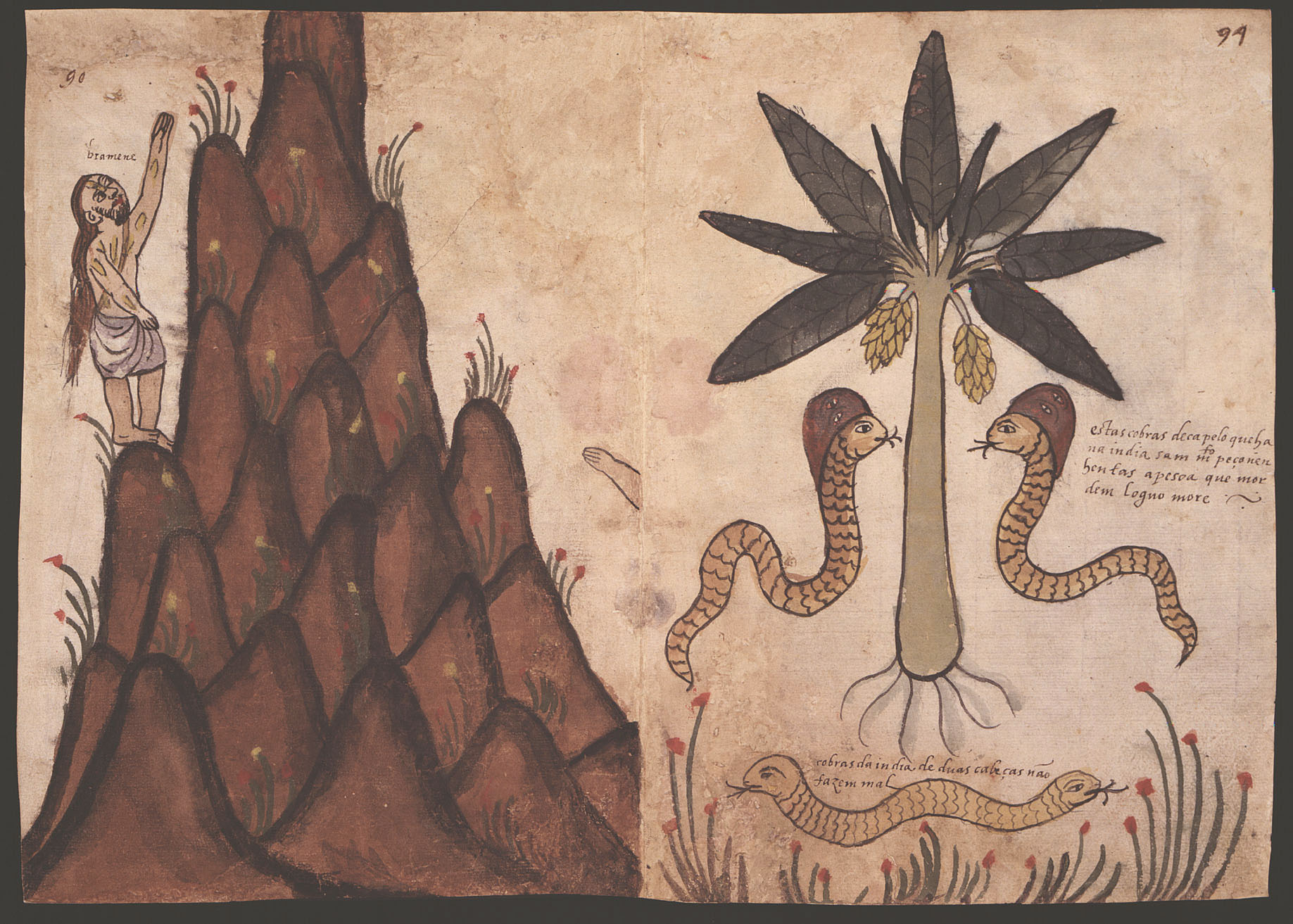
Illustration of the flora and fauna of India, c. 1540, including a pair of conjoined snakes resembling an amphisbaena

In The Book of Beasts, T. H. White suggests that the creature derives from sightings of the worm lizards of the same name.

The Códice Casanatense (c. 1540), a Portuguese book describing the areas the Portuguese had visited, includes an illustration of the flora and fauna of India. One of the animals shown is a two-headed snake (conjoined twin snakes), with one head on each end, much like an amphisbaena. The image is captioned, "two headed snakes of India are harmless".

In ancient times, the supposedly dangerous amphisbaena had many uses in the art of folk medicine and other magical remedies. Pliny notes that expecting women wearing a live amphisbaena around their necks would have safe pregnancies (Naturalis historia XXX, 128); however, if one's goal was to cure ailments such as arthritis or the common cold, one should wear only its skin (Naturalis historia XXX, 85): lumberjacks suffering from cold weather on the job could nail its carcass or skin to a tree to keep warm, while in the process allowing the tree to be felled more easily.

By eating the meat of the amphisbaena, one could supposedly attract many lovers of the opposite sex, and slaying one during the full moon could give power to one who is pure of heart and mind. ^{[primary reference needed]}

== Appearance ==
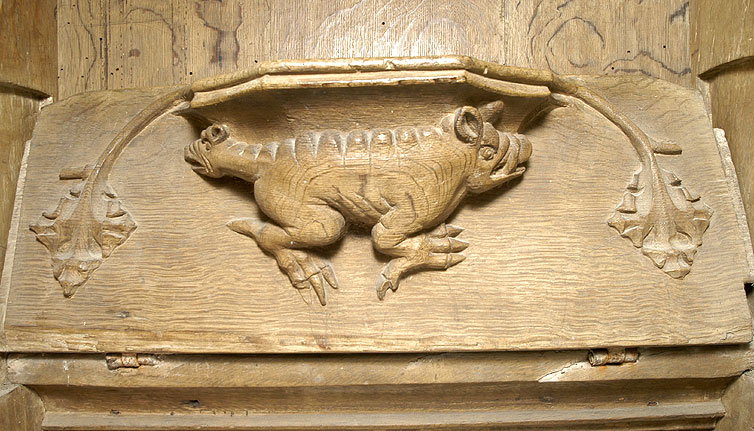
A 15th-century amphisbaena (a two-headed beast) on a misericord in Buckinghamshire

The amphisbaena has a twin head, that is one at the tail end as well, as though it were not enough for poison to be poured out of one mouth.

— Pliny the Elder, Naturalis Historia, VIII, 85

The Amphisbaena however is a snake with two heads, one at the top and one in the direction of the tail. When it advances, as need for a forward movement impels it, it leaves one end behind to serve as tail, while the other it uses as a head. Then again if it wants to move backwards, it uses the two heads in exactly the opposite manner from what it did before.

— Claudius Aelianus, Characteristics of Animals

The amphisbaena grows twin heads, one in the proper place, and the other where the tail should be. For this reason the snake glides in a circular shape, as the heads, contrary to what is right, strain from both ends.

— Solinus, Polyhistor

These early descriptions of the amphisbaena depict a venomous, dual-headed snakelike creature. However, medieval and later drawings often show it with two or more scaled feet, particularly chicken feet, and feathered wings. Some even depict it as a horned, dragon-like creature with a serpent-headed tail and small, round ears, while others have both "necks" of equal size so that it cannot be determined which is the rear head. Many descriptions of the amphisbaena say its eyes glow like candles or lightning, but the poet Nicander, the first to speak about it, described it as "always dull of eye". He also wrote: "From either end protrudes a blunt chin; each is far from each other." Nicander's account seems to be referring to a group of real lizards what is today called the Amphisbaenia, after the legendary creature, because their tail truncates in a manner that vaguely resembles the head.

Amphisbaena devouring a bird on the coat of arms of Gmina Zapolice in Poland

== In literature and other media ==
In Parmenides's poem there seems to be an allusion to the amphisbaena. Mortals are said to "stray two-headed, for perplexity in their own breasts directs their mind astray".

In Dante's Inferno, the amphisbaena is listed as one of the types of reptiles that torment thieves in the seventh bolgia.

In John Milton's Paradise Lost, after the fall and the return of Satan to Hell, some of the fallen angelic host are transformed into amphisbaena, to represent the animal by which the Fall was caused, i.e. a snake.

Amphisbaena appears in some editions of the tabletop roleplaying game Dungeons & Dragons.

The Vanterviper is a creature in the film Gallavants, that fits the description of an amphisbeana.

Amphisbaena has appeared in several video games as an enemy or boss monster, including La-Mulana and Bravely Second: End Layer. A creature called Amphisbaena appears in the games Castlevania: Symphony of the Night and Portrait of Ruin but bears little resemblance to other renditions of the creature, appearing as an eyeless, quadrupedal reptile with the upper body of a human woman sprouting from its tail instead of a double-headed serpent.

The amphisbaena is mentioned in The Last Wish, from The Witcher series by Andrzej Sapkowski, while protagonist Geralt of Rivia recalls past events. The amphisbaena was endangering the region of Kovir until the beast was slain by Geralt's hand.

Amphisbaena is referenced in RWBY, an animated web series created by Monty Oum, in the form of an evil creature called Grimm. Of the different Grimm, the amphisbaena appears to be the King Taijitu, a two-headed snake or serpent. The king's name references the taijitu, a symbol or diagram in Chinese philosophy representing Taiji in both its monist and dualist aspects. The Grimm's coloration visually symbolizes the taijitu, with one head and body section black and the opposite side white.

The amphisbaena appears in the Rise of the Teenage Mutant Ninja Turtles episode "Battle Nexus: New York", where it is a champion in the Battle Nexus.

Brandon Sanderson's novel Skyward has a character whose name is Arturo Mendez. His call sign is amphisbaena.

Beyblade has a character named Enrique whose bit beast (ancient spirits contained within spinning tops) is named Amphilyon. It takes the form of a medieval amphisbaena with bat wings.

== See also ==
- Amphisbaenia
- Polycephaly
- Ouroboros
- Double-headed serpent
- Pushmi-Pullyu

== Bibliography ==
- Coxon, A. H. (2009), The Fragments of Parmenides: A Critical Text With Introduction and Translation, the Ancient Testimonia and a Commentary. Las Vegas, Parmenides Publishing (new edition of Coxon 1986), ISBN 978-1-930972-67-4
- Hunt, Jonathan (1998). Bestiary: An Illuminated Alphabet of Medieval Beasts (1st ed.). Hong Kong: Simon & Schuster. ISBN 0-689-81246-9.
- Levy, Sidney J. (1996). "Stalking the Amphisbaena", Journal of Consumer Research, 23 (3), Dec. 1996, pp. 163–176.
