= Tree of Life (Kester) =

2005 sculpture by Mozambican artists

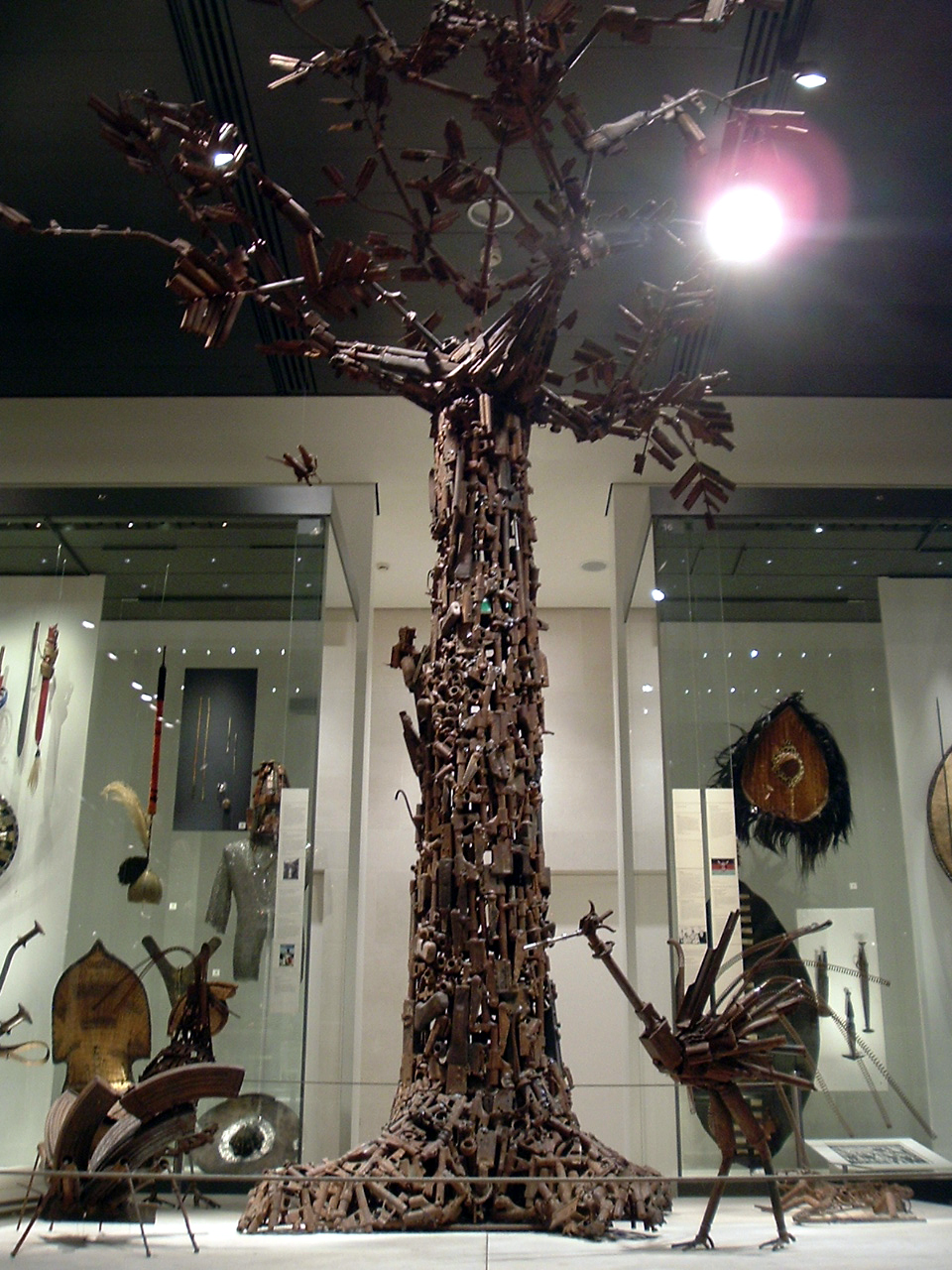
- On display in the British Museum
- Material: recycled weapons
- Size: Height: 3.5 m.
- Created: 2004
- Place: Maputo
- Present location: Room 25 of the British Museum
- Registration: AOA 2005 Af. 1.1

The Tree of Life is a sculpture created by four artists in Mozambique. It was commissioned and then installed in the British Museum in 2005. It was built from the surrender of 600,000 weapons that were converted into art following an initiative started by Bishop Dinis Sengulane.

== Description ==
The sculpture was created by four artists, Kester, Hilario Nhatugueja, Fiel dos Santos and Adelino Serafim Maté in Maputo, as part of a co-operative called Associação Núcleo de Arte in Maputo.

The scheme was created by the Mozambican Christian Council and supported by Christian Aid. It was Bishop Dinis Sengulane's idea which led to the creation of an organisation called "Transformacao de Armas em Enxadas" or "Transforming Arms into Tools". Sengulane who was one of the people credited for creating the opportunity for peace following the Mozambique Civil War.

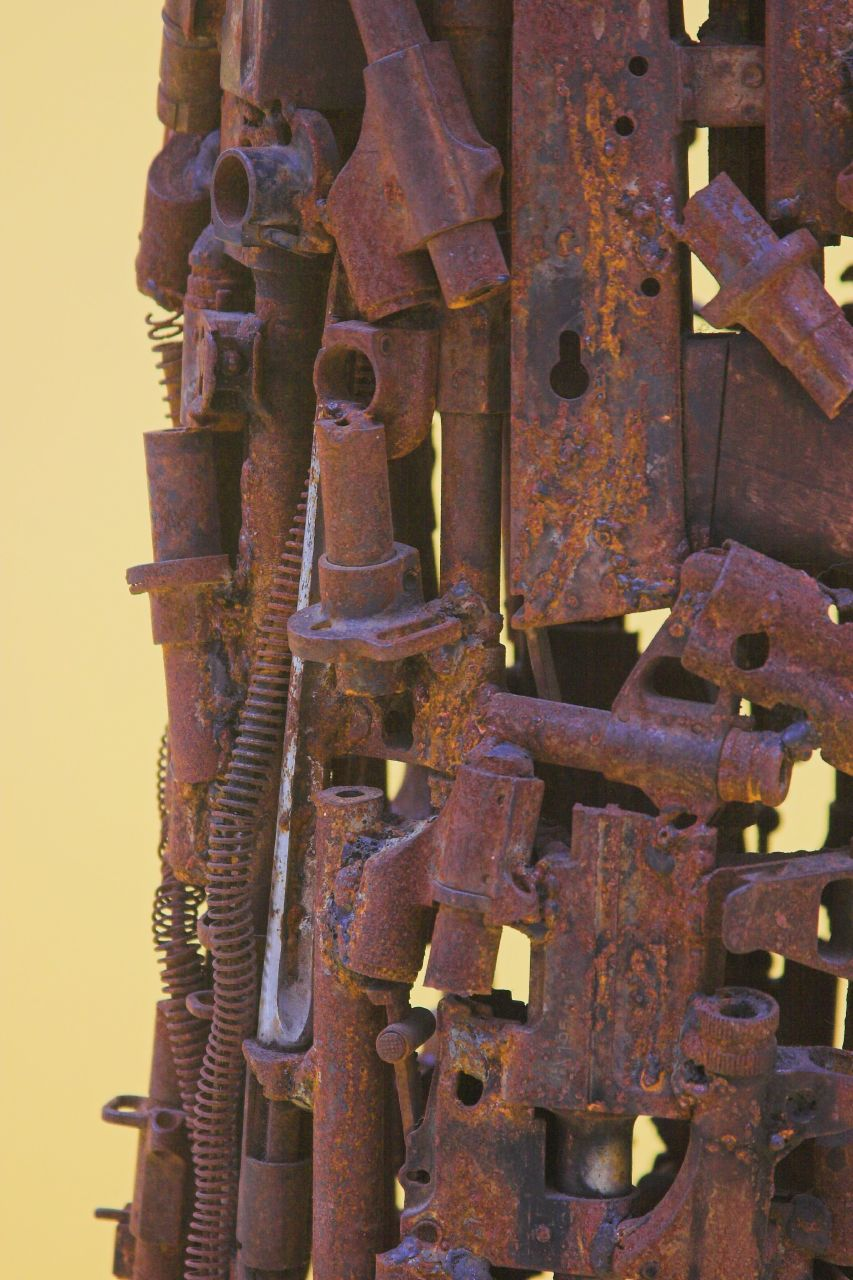
A close up of the trunk of the tree

The "Transforming Arms into Tools" organisation supplied the decommissioned weapons to the artists and his group for this and many other related pieces of sculpture.

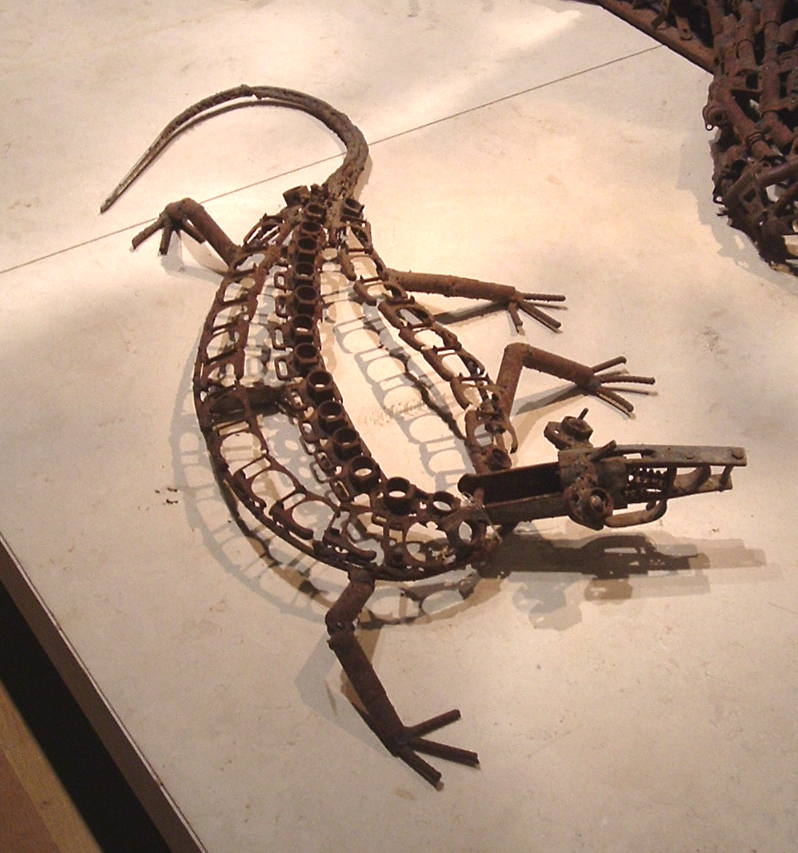
A lizard: one of the animals at the base of the tree

Around the bottom of the main trunk, which weighs half a ton (c. 500 kg), there are some complementary sculptures of animals. The animals are a turtle, a lizard and two birds. These too are made from welded guns. Weapons are important symbols in Mozambique. An AK47 still features on Mozambique's flag. This sculpture was made from weapons which include Kalashnikov AK47s, Walther 42s, German MP 40s and British 4.85mms.

The millions of weapons in Mozambique were the remains of the civil war that was funded by South Africa and Rhodesia and involved emigrants from both of their regimes. One million people were killed and the war only ended when the Soviet Union collapsed and the funding ended. Kofi Annan of the United Nations said, when similar work was being discussed, "We don't manufacture weapons, we sometimes don't even have money to buy them. How do we get these weapons to kill each other?"

== Provenance ==
This sculpture was commissioned by the British Museum in 2005 after they had purchased another sculpture called Throne of Weapons in 2002. The sculpture had been brought to England by Christian Aid's Julia Fairrie as part of an exhibition called Swords into Ploughshares. Transforming Arms into Art, following a documentary film for Christian Aid and the BBC of the same name.

== Importance ==
This piece was exhibited in the museum main area from February 2005. It played a leading part in the "Africa 2005 Season" which took place in Britain and involved the Arts Council, the British Museum, Christian Aid and a number of London galleries. The season finished in October 2005. In 2010 the tree is a feature of room 25 of the British Museum. Bishop Sengulane who started this project said.

Why should this world have hungry people? Why should this world have a shortage of medicines? And yet, the amount of money which can be made available, almost instantly, for armament purposes is just amazing, and I would say shocking.

== Gallery ==
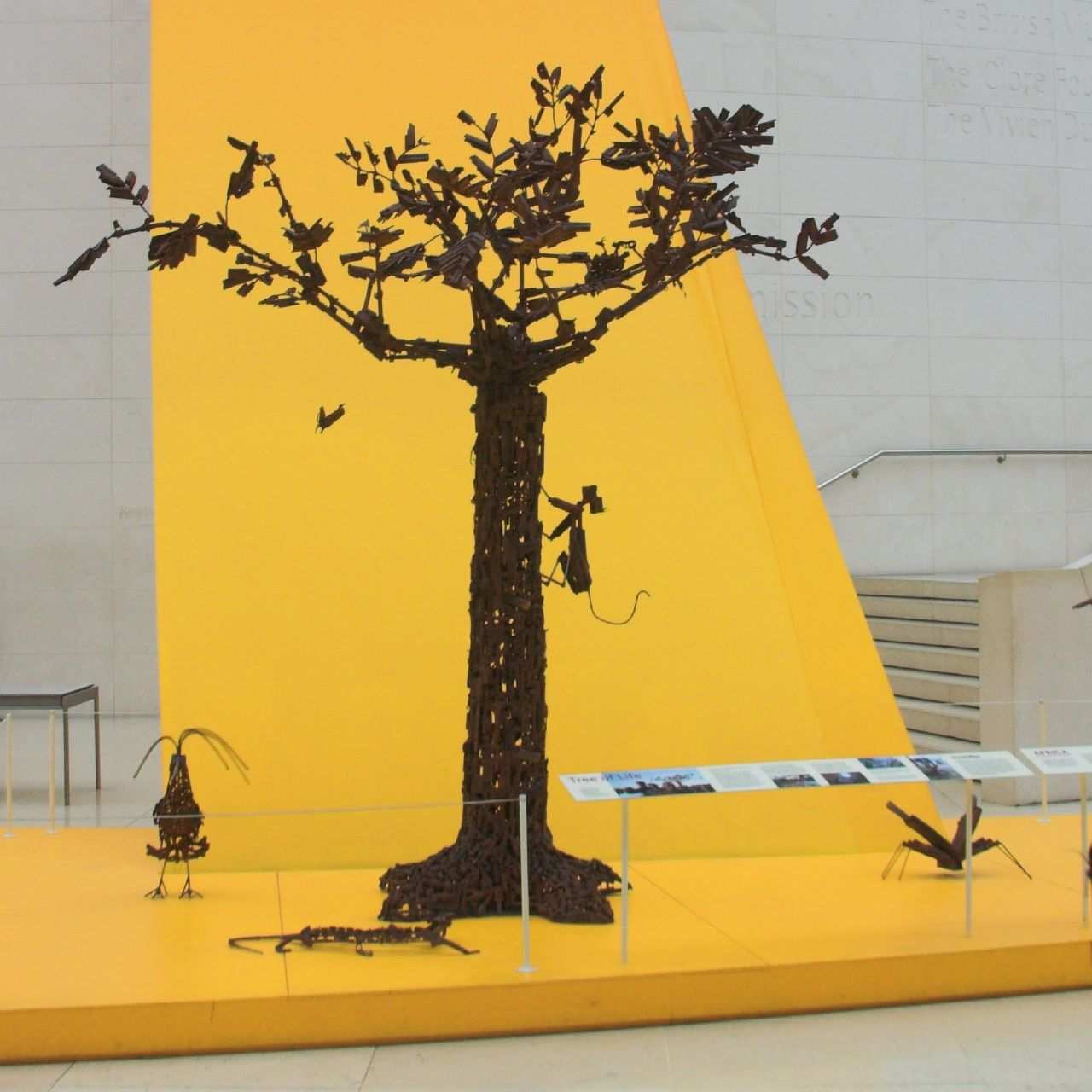
