= Double-headed serpent =

Aztec sculpture primarily made of turquoise

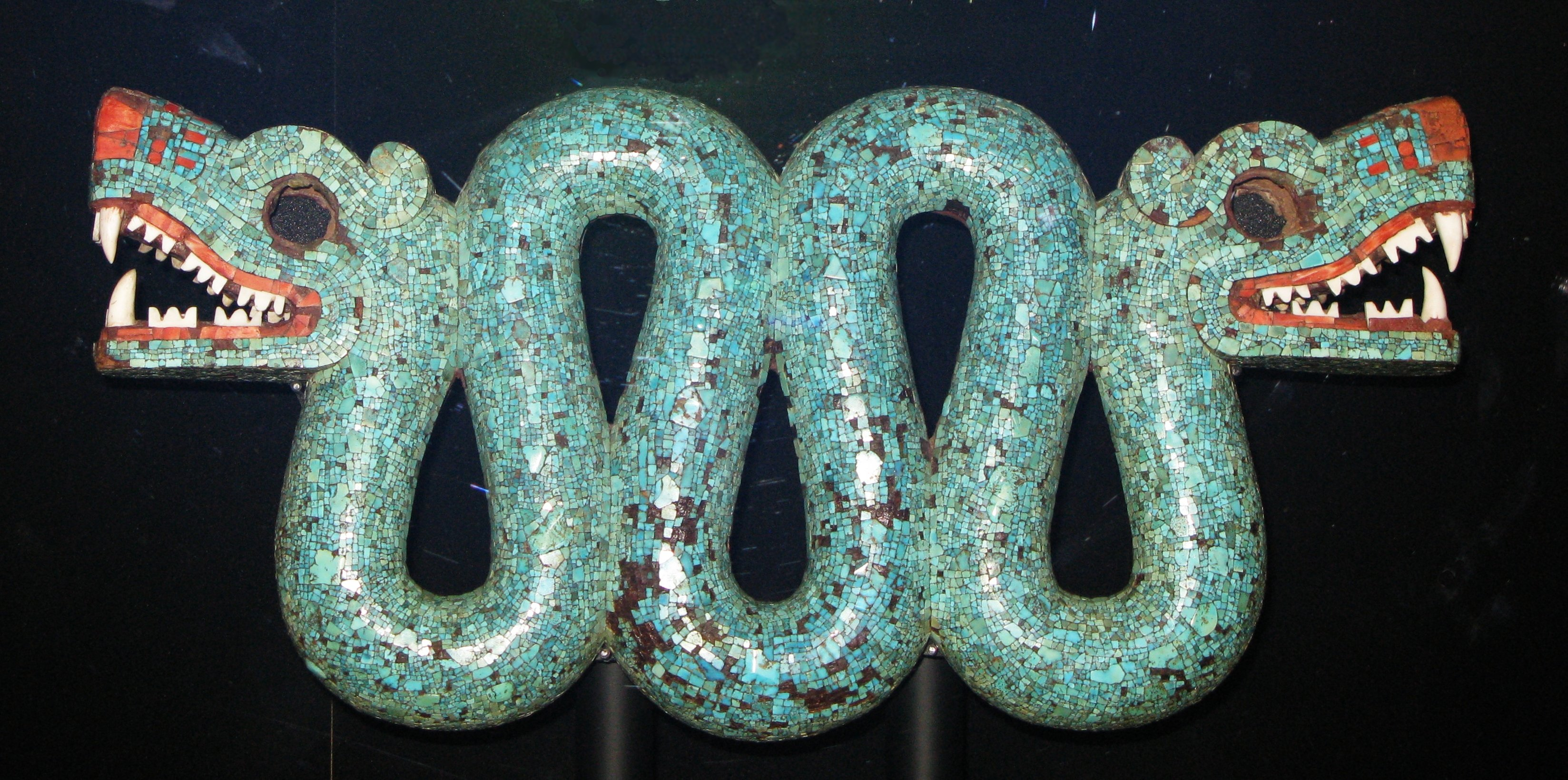
- Material: Wood, turquoise, pine resin, shell, and others
- Size: 20.5 by 43.3 cm
- Created: 15th/16th century
- Place: Made in Mexico
- Present location: Room 27, British Museum, London

The Double-headed serpent is an Aztec sculpture. It is a snake with two heads composed of mostly turquoise pieces applied to a wooden base. It might have been worn or displayed in religious ceremonies. The mosaic is made of pieces of turquoise, spiny oyster shell and conch shell. The sculpture is at the British Museum. Also It was created in the middle of the 15 century.

== Description ==
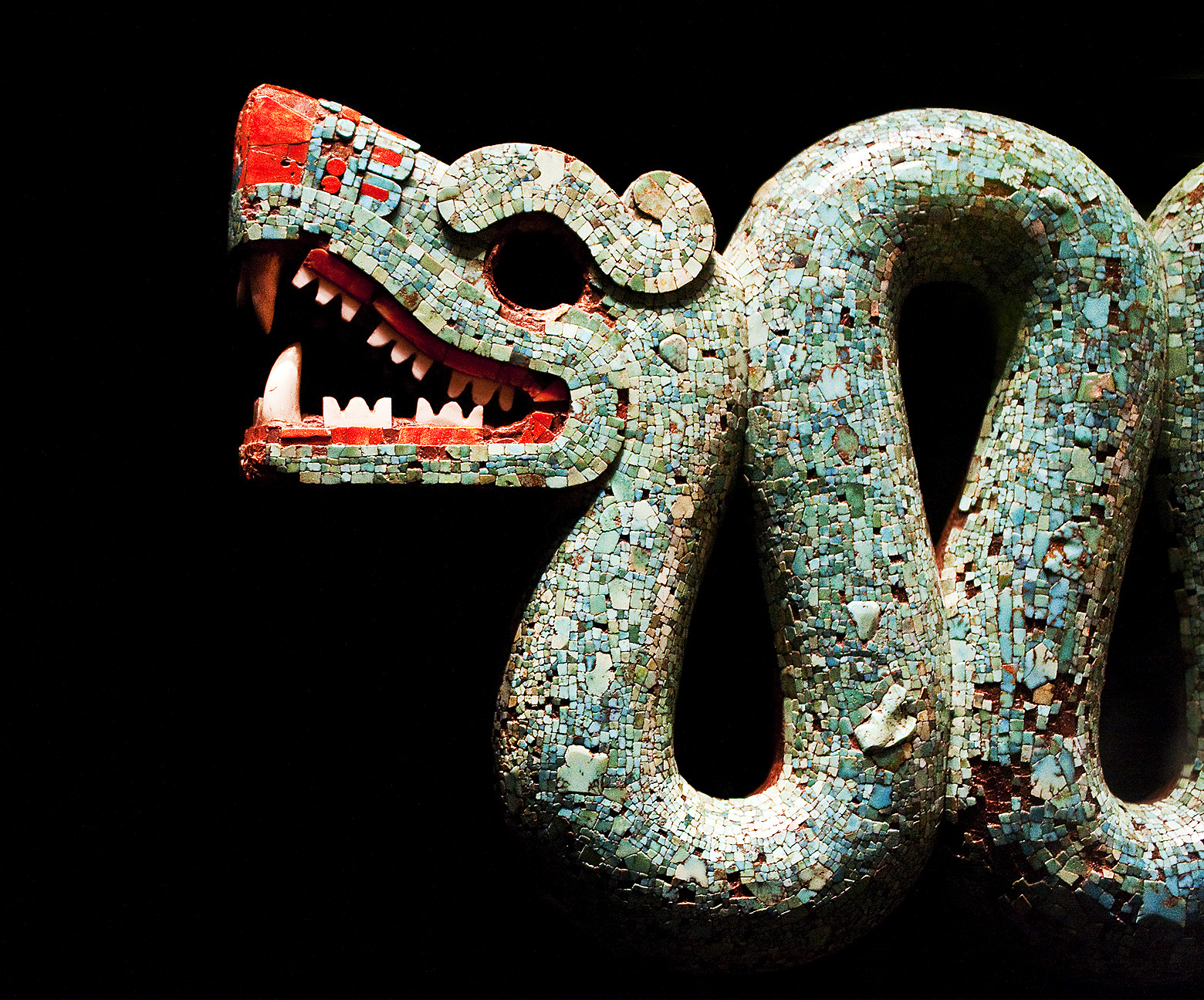
Detail of one of the serpent's heads

The sculpture is of an undulating serpent with heads on each side. A single block of cedar wood (Cedrela odorata) forms the sculpture's base. The back side has been hollowed out, possibly to make the sculpture lighter. The back, once gilded, is now plain, and only the heads have decorations on both sides. The outer body of the two-headed snake is covered in a mosaic of turquoise, accented by red spiny oyster. Turquoise stones were broken in small, flat tesserae and adhered to the wooden body with pine resin. By using 2,000 small pieces, the flat pieces of stone give the impression of a faceted, curvilinear surface. The turquoise was cut and ground using stone tools. Some of the turquoise was imported to Mesoamerica from approximately 1,600 km to the northwest, from the Four Corners Region of Oasisamerica where the Ancestral Pueblo people mined the stone.

The heads of the serpents have holes for eyes, and remaining traces of beeswax and resin may have once held objects representing eyes, possibly orbs of iron pyrite (Fool's Gold). The vivid contrast of the red and white details on the head have been made from oyster shell and conch shell respectively. The adhesive used to attach the Spondylus princeps shell has been colored with red iron oxide (hematite) to complete the design. The white shell used for the teeth comes from shells of the edible queen conch.

== Provenance ==
It is not known how this sculpture left Mexico, but it is considered possible that it was among the goods obtained by conquistador Hernán Cortés when he took the interior of Mexico for the Spanish crown. Cortés arrived on the coast of what is now Mexico in 1519, and after battles he entered the capital on November 8, 1519 and was met with respect, if not favour, by the Aztec ruler Moctezuma II (Montezuma). Some sources report that Moctezuma thought that Cortés was the feathered serpent god Quetzalcoatl and treated him accordingly. However, scholars such as Matthew Restall claim this idea was a Spanish invention used as propaganda.

Either way, Cortés was given a number of valuable gifts, which included turquoise sculptures, and possibly this serpent. Despite the gifts and the peaceful reception, Moctezuma was taken prisoner by Cortés and his troops took Moctezuma's capital, Tenochtitlan, by 1521. They then fell victim to smallpox and other old world diseases brought to Mexico by Cortés and his troops.

The Cortés antiquities arrived in Europe in the 1520s and caused great interest; however, it is said that other turquoise mosaics ended their days in jewellers' shops in Florence where they were dismantled to make more contemporary objects. Neil Macgregor credits Henry Christy with gathering similar artifacts into the British Museum. The sculpture is at the British Museum, purchased from whereabouts unknown by the Christy Fund.

== Significance ==
This sculpture is one of nine Mexican turquoise mosaics in the British Museum. There are considered to be only 25 Mexican turquoise mosaics in Europe from this period.

Many theories suggest the symbolic significance of the serpent imagery. It has been proposed that the serpent was a symbol of rebirth because of its ability to shed its old skin and appear as a reborn snake. It may have been a representation of the earth and underworld with each head representing one. The snake features strongly in the gods that the people worshiped. The feathered serpent god Quetzalcoatl, patron of priests and symbol of death and resurrection was important to Mixtec religion, but other gods also had serpentine characteristics.

However, the best known craftsmen for their turquoise mosaics were not the Aztecs but the Mixtecs. At the height of the Aztec Empire, many Mixtec towns came under Aztec rule had to pay tribute to the emperor, including gifts of gold and turquoise. This serpent would have made a valuable item of tribute- an example of the fearsome Aztecs.

== History of the World ==
This sculpture featured in A History of the World in 100 Objects, a series of radio programs that started in 2010 as a collaboration between the BBC and the British Museum. It was also featured in Historium, a collection of ancient objects from all over the world.

== See also ==
- Amphisbaena
- Polycephaly
- Ouroboros

Preceded by 77: Benin Bronzes	A History of the World in 100 Objects; Object 78	Succeeded by 79: Kakiemon elephants
