= Dinis Sengulane =

Anglican priest

The Right Rev. Dinis Sengulane
- Church: Anglican Church of Southern Africa
- Diocese: Anglican Bishop of Lebombo, Maputo, in Mozambique
- See: Lebombo
- In office: 1976-2014
- Predecessor: Daniel Pina Cabral
- Successor: Carlos Matsinhe

Orders
- Ordination: 1975
- Consecration: 25 March 1976

Personal details
- Born: 5 March 1946 (age 80)

Dinis Salomão Sengulane (born 5 March 1946) is a Mozambican Anglican prelate. He was the Anglican Bishop of Lebombo, Maputo, Mozambique, from 1976 to 2014. He had an important role in the end of the Mozambican Civil War in 1992 and helped with the surrender of 600,000 weapons that were converted into art. He was amongst the longest serving Anglican bishops.

== Church career ==
Dinis Salomão Sengulane trained at the Salisbury Theological College in England. He was ordained deacon in 1974, ordained priest in 1975, and ordained bishop on 25 March 1976.

In November 1988 it became public knowledge that Sengulane was leading a church delegation that was trying to intercede between the rebel force of Redarmo and the President of Mozambique. These talks were to lead to both sides putting forward the conditions they needed to achieve peace. The Peace and Reconciliation Campaign led to meetings with the President of Renamo in August 1989. The efforts of Sengulane preceded meetings in Rome that ended the civil war that were organised by a lay Christian community at Sant Egidio. They and Sengulane were credited with creating the opportunity for peace.

Sengulane suggested that the thousands of weapons left over from the war should be surrendered in exchange for items useful to a civilian. He founded a scheme that transformed these weapons into art. As Sengulane was known for his work creating peace following the civil war in Mozambique, he was able to obtain funding from Christian Aid. There is an artists collective called "Associação Núcleo de Arte" which was supported by Christian Aid and Bishop Sengulane as part of an organisation called "Transformacao de Armas em Enxadas" or "Transforming Arms into Tools". Works that have been exhibited internationally include Throne of Weapons and the Tree of Life.

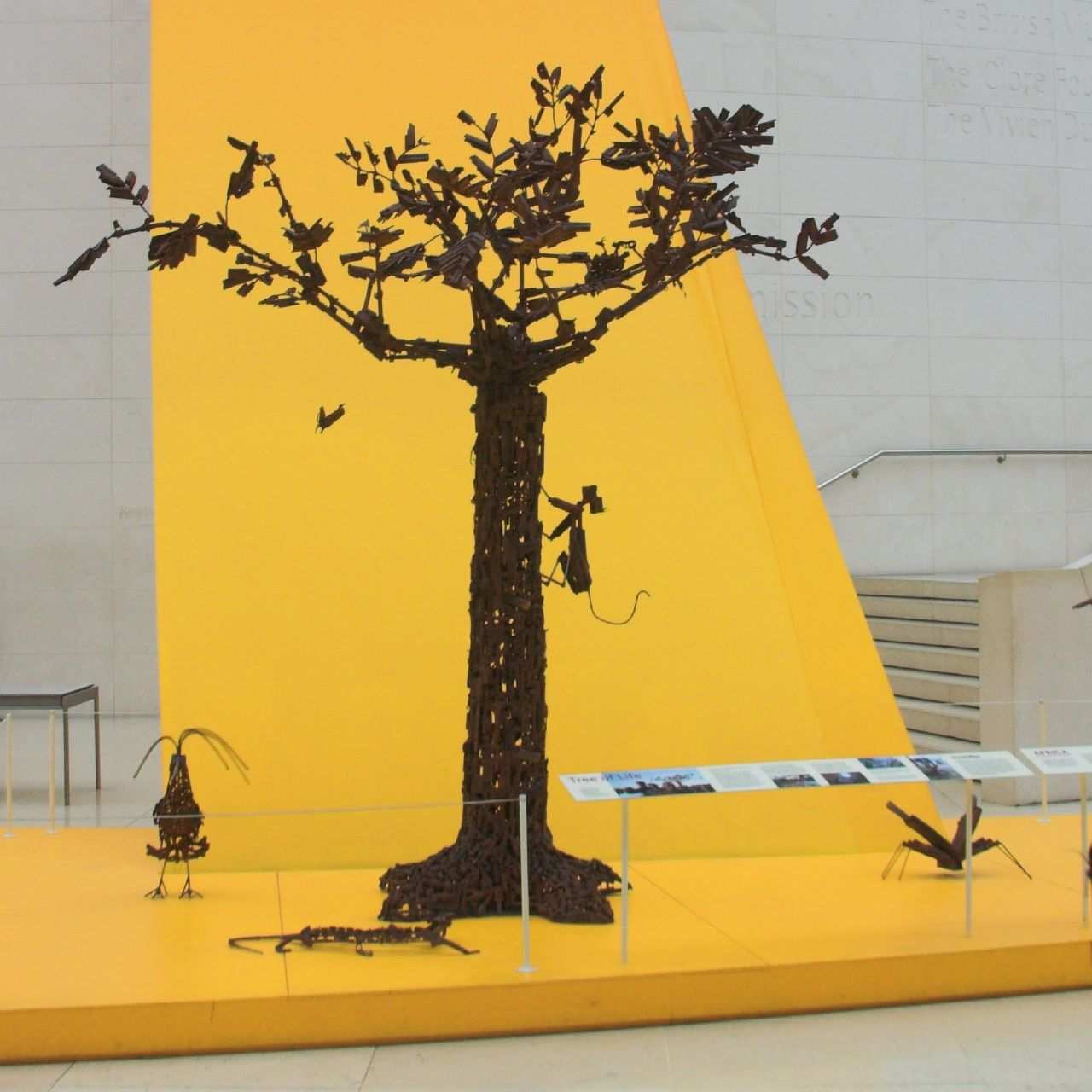
"The Tree of Life" on display in the British Museum

In 2005 Sengulane was invited to Britain to celebrate the success of his idea that had transformed "Swords into ploughshares" in the way that Sengulane had devised nine years before. The art works were just the visible part. His idea had allowed people to anonymously exchange 600,000 weapons for books, bicycles, building materials and sewing machines. Most of the weapons were broken and then melted down but some were recycled and the Bishop sometime wears a crucifix that was made out of parts from surrendered weapons. One village in Mozambique had so many weapons that they managed to exchange them for a tractor.

He is an Anglican Pacifist Fellowship counsellor.

He announced his retirement for 25 March 2014, at which point he was the longest serving bishop of the Anglican Communion, having been in office for 38 years.

== Anti-malaria campaign ==
Another of Sengulane's interests is to relieve the blight of malaria across the world. He has attended conferences and spoken out in support of the need to fight this disease. Sengulane is the chairperson of Rollback Malaria, where he is supported by U.S. President Barack Obama's initiative to reduce malaria mortality.

== Personal life ==
Sengulane met his future wife when she volunteered at his church in Mozambique. After they married on 9 October 1977, Esperanca Berta Sengulane (usually known as Berta) became the Bishop's chief support; bishops in Mozambiqiue are called "Grandpa" and his wife became known as "Grandma" Berta. They had four children in the next seven years - Teófilo, Crisóstomo Alfeu, Fidélia Rute and Bruno Ernesto. In 1998 Berta Sengulane was killed in a car accident at Zove. She had helped in the work of the church and founded congregations. Sengulane attributes the dramatic rise on congregations and number of churches in the area of her death to her work. Seven years after her death, at the time of what would have been her 50th birthday in 2005, celebrations of her life were held in Mozambique, which included memorials, tree plantings, and the presentation of mosquito nets to the maternity unit in which she had been born.

On 4 April 2012, then aged 65, Bishop Sengulane announced that he was again engaged to be married. His fiancée was Lina Valoi, and they married in Maputo on 8 December 2012.

== Honours ==
Sengulane was awarded the All Africa Conference of Churches Peace Award in 1992, DIAKONIA Peace Award the following year and in 1996 he was awarded both the Cross of St Augustine by the Archbishop of Canterbury and the British Honorary Companion of the Order of St Michael and St George.

Anglican Church of Southern Africa titles
Preceded by Daniel Pina Cabral	Bishop of Lebombo; 1976 – 2014	Succeeded by Carlos Matsinhe
