= Throne of Weapons =

2002 sculpture by Cristóvão Canhavato

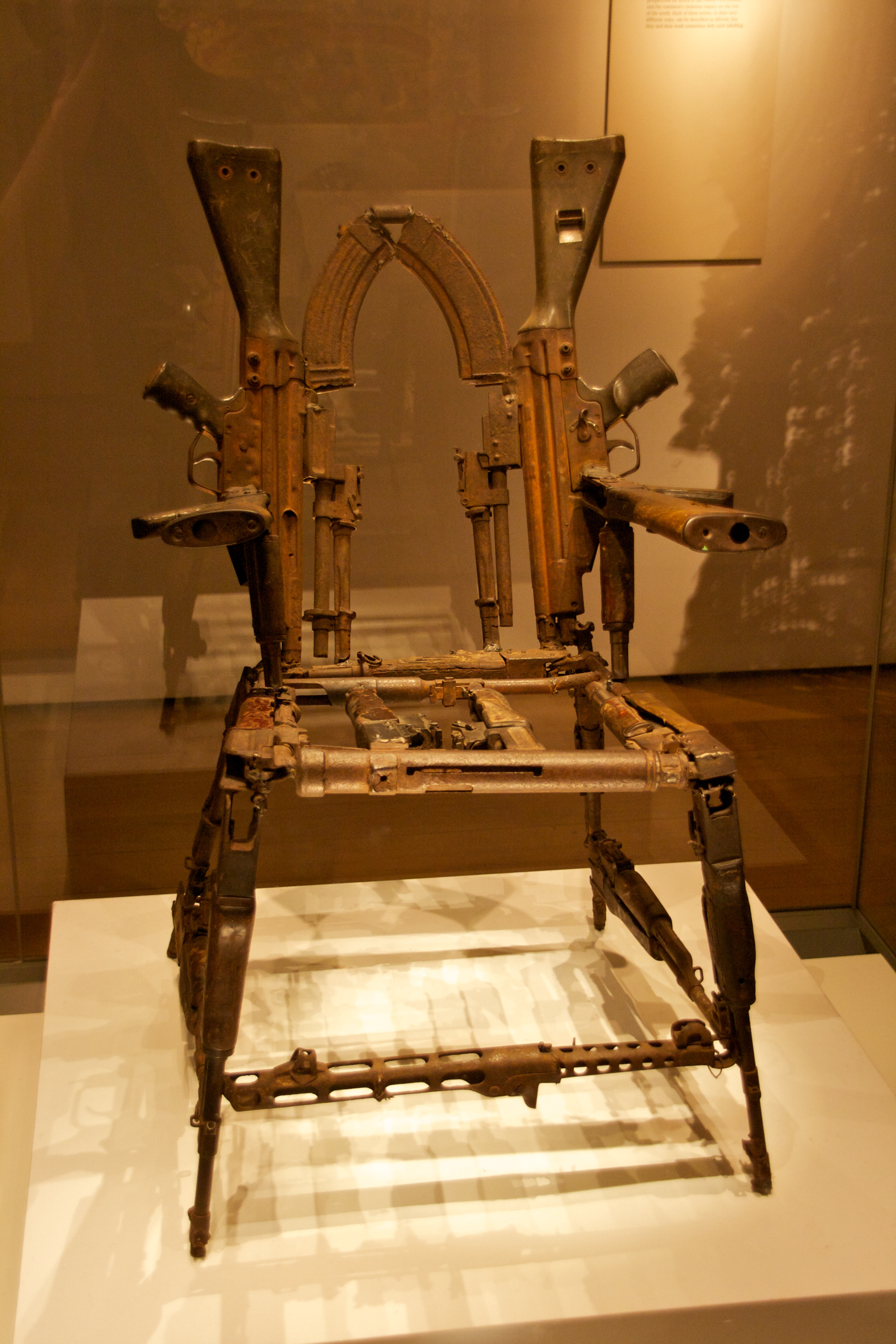
- On display in the museum
- Material: recycled weapons
- Size: Height: 101 cm Width: 61 cm
- Created: c.2002
- Place: Maputo
- Present location: Room 25 in the British Museum
- Registration: 2002.Af1.1

The Throne of Weapons (Portuguese: Trono de Armas) is a 2002 sculpture created by Cristóvão Canhavato out of disused weapons. It is owned by the British Museum and has been called the museum's most "eloquent object" and has been shown in a wide variety of ways.

== Description ==
The Throne of Weapons was created by Cristóvão Estevão Canhavato, who was born in 1966 in Zavala in southern Mozambique. Canhavato works under the name Kester as part of a co-operative called Associação Núcleo de Arte. Kester's artistic education took place at the artist's collective—although he already had a knowledge of engineering construction. The artists collective was supported by Christian Aid and another Christian group led by Bishop Dinis Sengulane as part of an organisation called Transformação de Armas em Enxadas or "Transforming Arms into Tools".

The throne has been signed by the artist, but as the curators have noted, the throne has also been "signed" by termites who have traditionally damaged African wooden sculptures. Kester, the artist, points out the smiling faces that he has included in his work even though his relatives were injured by weapons like these. At the top of the right hand rifle butt is a human face, but the face was only "found" by the artist. The holes and marks are the remains of where a strap had been attached when it was carried by its owner. The symbol Kester created was the gothic shape at the back which is intended to symbolise a church.

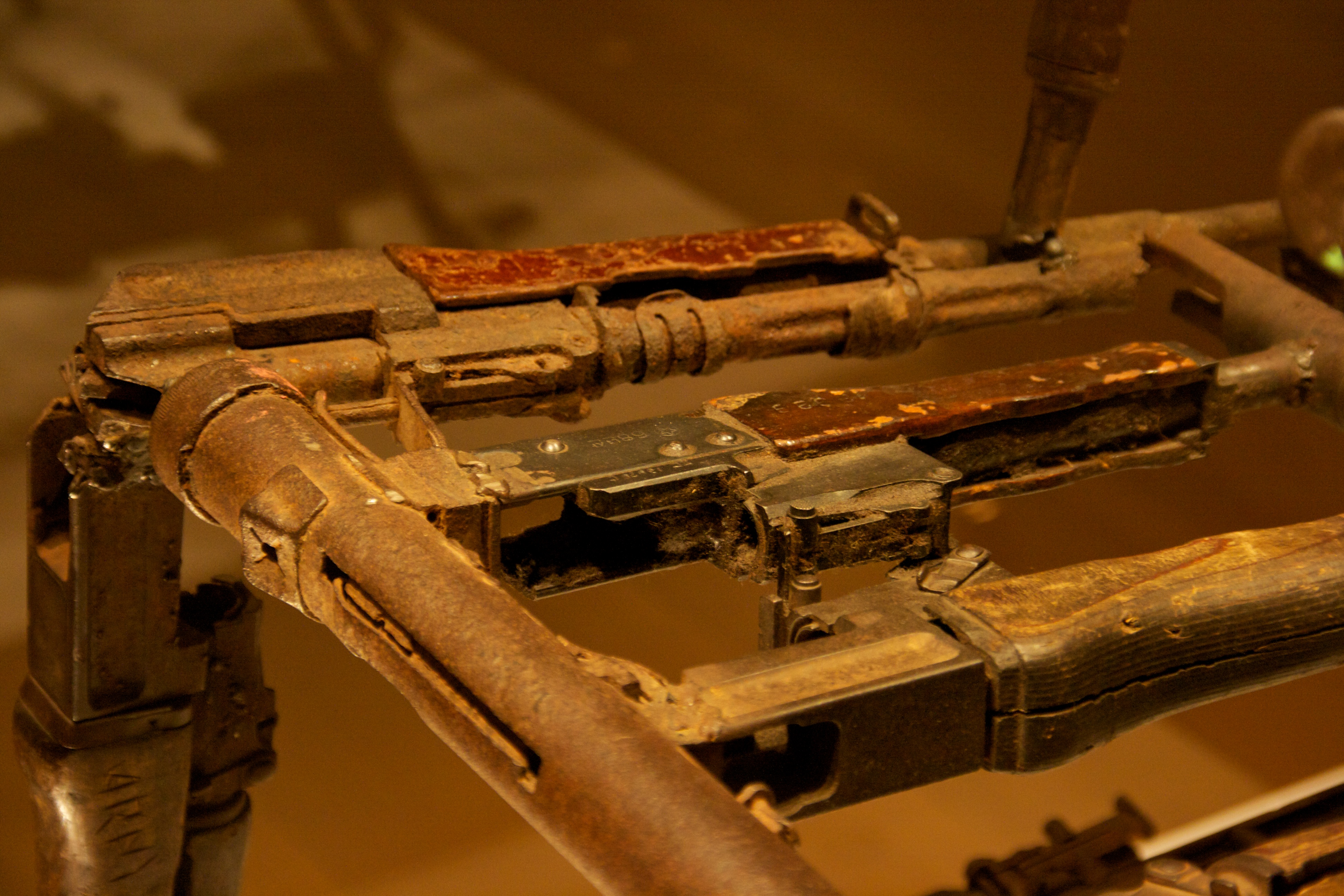
Detail of the throne's seat

The "Transforming Arms into Tools" organisation supplied the decommissioned weapons to Kester and his group for this and many other related pieces of sculpture. The guns, mostly AK-47 assault rifles, were manufactured in Portugal, Eastern Europe and North Korea. The H&K G3 rifles used to form the backrest were designed in Germany and manufactured in Portugal. They were widely used throughout West Africa. The Russian contribution of the iconic AK-47 rifle is important to the design—an AK-47, a hoe, and a book still feature on Mozambique's flag.

On the front of the chair is a North Korean manufactured AKM rifle and a single PPSh-43 submachine gun, and the weapons that make up the seat were made in Poland and Czechoslovakia.

The weapons in Mozambique arise from a civil war that was funded by South Africa and Rhodesia and involved emigrants from their apartheid regimes. One million people were killed and the war only ended when the Soviet Union collapsed and the funding ended. Kofi Annan said when this chair was being discussed, "We don't manufacture weapons, we sometimes don't even have money to buy them. How do we get these weapons to kill each other?"

== Provenance ==
The throne was purchased by the British Museum in 2002, brokered by Christian Aid's Julia Fairrie. The sculpture had been brought to England by Christian Aid as part of an exhibition called "Swords into Ploughshares. Transforming Arms into Art" curated by Julia Fairrie. In 2005 the museum went on to commission another art work from the same group of artists in Maputo. The resulting piece was called "Tree of Life" and it was exhibited in the museum's main area from February 2005.

== Importance ==
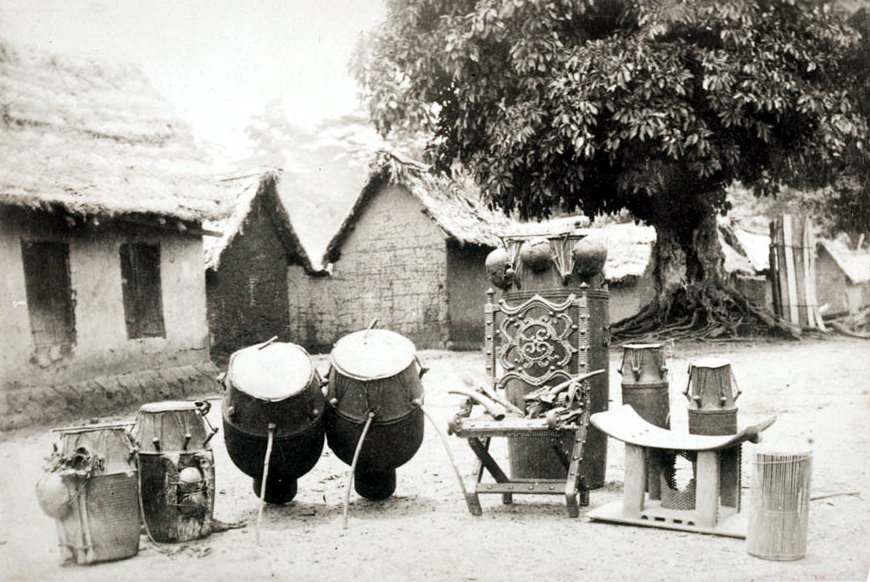
The Throne of Begoro in Ghana in the 1880s

The Associação Núcleo de Arte in Maputo has been an artists' collective since the 1930s and despite the end of empire and a civil war it is still supporting artists as it did to Maputo, the painter Malangatana Ngwenya in the 1950s.

The symbolism of recycling decommissioned weapons from around the world is self-evident. However, there is an added meaning because chairs can be a symbol of authority in Africa. A nineteenth century example of a chief's chair from Ghana is shown for comparison.

The Throne of Weapons was sent on tour by the British Museum and has been exhibited in schools, shopping centres, museums, cathedrals, community spaces and a prison around the United Kingdom. It has travelled internationally but also toured Northern Ireland, Wales, Scotland and England. It has been called the museum's most "eloquent object" and may have been shown in a wider variety of ways than any other artifact.

The sculpture was chosen to be featured in A History of the World in 100 Objects, a series of radio programmes that started in 2010 as a collaboration between the BBC and the British Museum.

Preceded by 97: In the dull village	A History of the World in 100 Objects; Object 98	Succeeded by 99: Credit Card
