= W. Carl Kester =

American economist

W. Carl Kester is an American economist currently the George Fisher Baker Jr. Professor of Business Administration at Harvard Business School.
