= Hornedjitef =

Ancient Egyptian priest of Amun

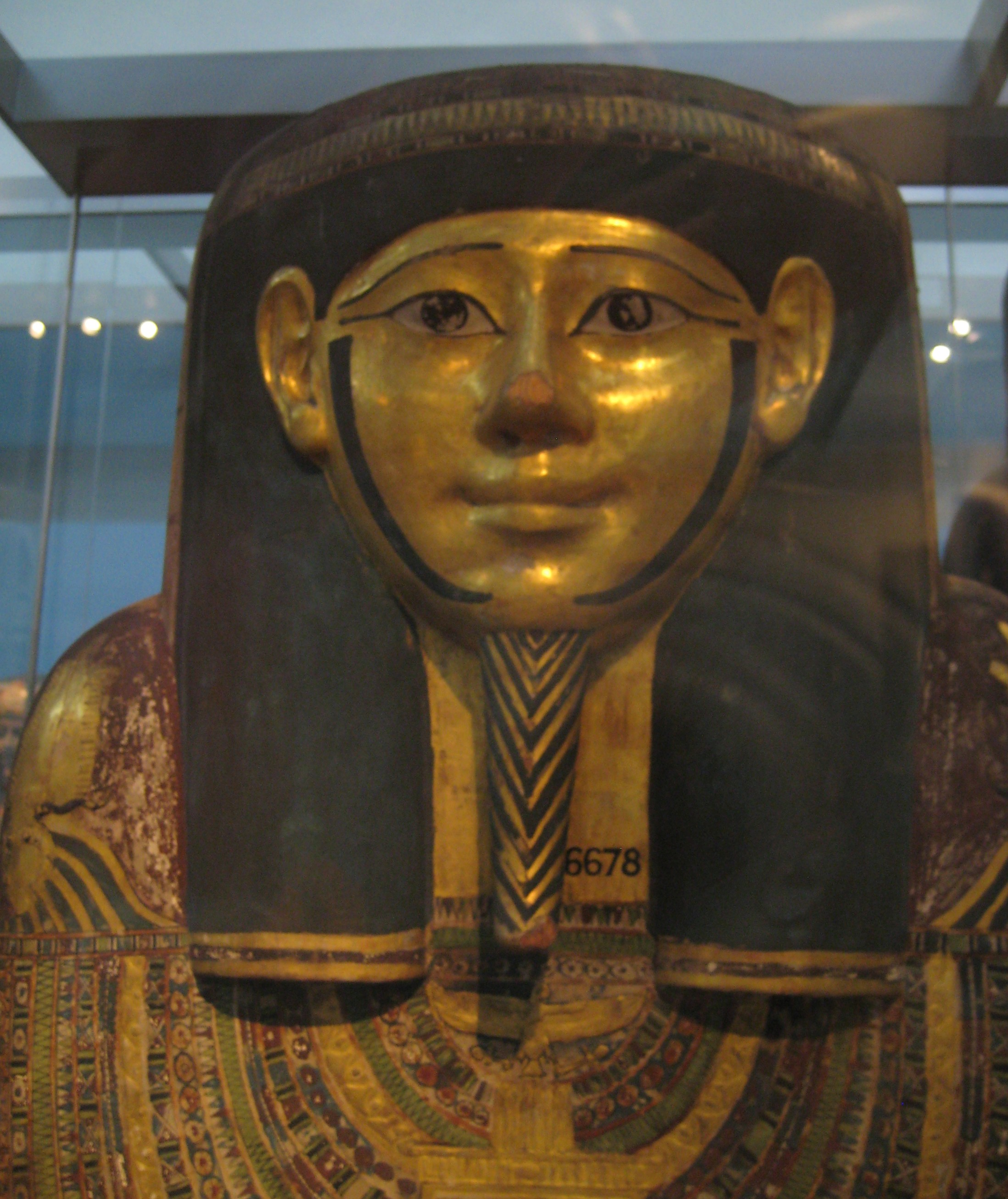
The upper part of the inner coffin of Hornedjitef.

Hornedjitef was an ancient Egyptian priest in the Temple of Amun at Karnak during the reign of Ptolemy III (246–222 BC). He is known from his elaborate coffins, mummy mask and mummy, dating from the Early Ptolemaic Period (around 220 BC) and excavated from Asasif, Thebes, Egypt, which are all held in the British Museum. These related objects were chosen as the first of the hundred objects selected by British Museum Director Neil MacGregor in the 2010 BBC Radio 4 series A History of the World in 100 Objects.

Along with his coffins, mummy-case, mummy-mask and mummy, Hornedjitef's tomb contained items such as a papyrus Book of the Dead and a painted wooden figure of Ptah-Sokar-Osiris.

== Reading ==
- Mack, J. (ed.), Masks: the art of expression London: The British Museum Press, 1994
- Strudwick, Nigel, Masterpieces of Ancient Egypt, London: British Museum Publications, 2006. ISBN 978-0-7141-1972-4.
- Walker, S. and Bierbrier, M., Ancient faces: mummy portraits London: The British Museum Press, 1997
