= Suffragette penny =

1913 coins defaced by British suffragettes

- England
- Value: Penny, Half-crown
- Years of minting: 1913-1914
- Mintage: 10 or 11 known

Obverse
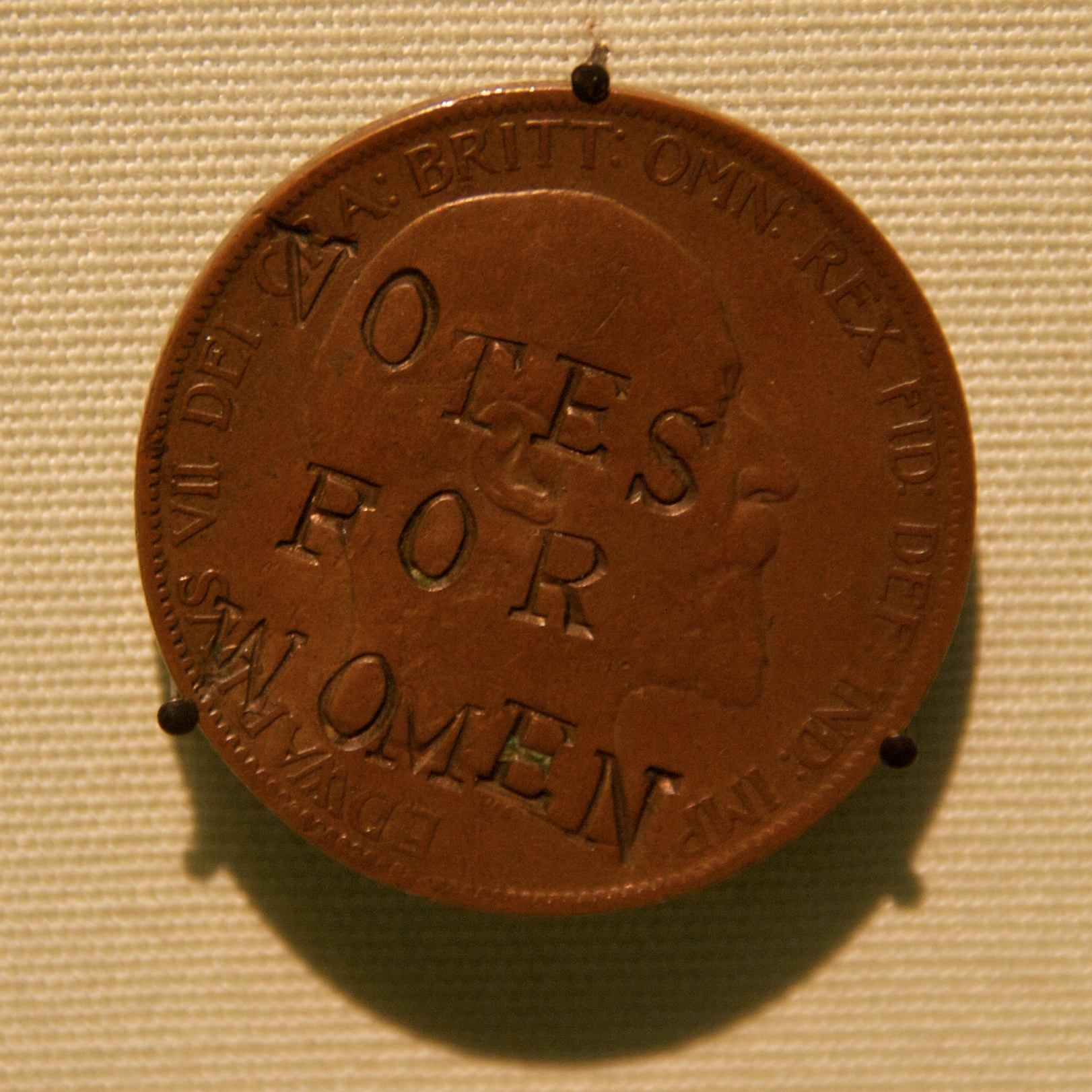
- Design: Defaced with the words 'Votes For Women'

Reverse

The Suffragette penny is the name given to surviving examples of pre-decimal British pennies that were defaced by British suffragettes. There are currently only 10 or 11 pennies known to exist and all are believed to date from 1913.

== Manufacture ==
Each penny was hand stamped using metal punches and a hammer. Of the existing examples, all have the words "Votes for Women" across the obverse side of the coin, marked by the head of the king, either Edward VII or George V. The exceptions to this are the three coins minted during the reign of Queen Victoria, where the words are on the reverse of the coin.

The surviving coins can be identified by the similarities in the 'T', 'M', 'E' and 'O'. The same set of punches was used for all known, surviving, genuine examples. It has been suggested that all coins may have been produced by one individual. Although all the coins are referred to as pennies, one of the surviving coins is actually a half crown.

Scrutiny of catalogues and journals produced by the suffrage movement do not list these pieces for sale. The practice was also used by American suffrage activists to deface currency in the United States.

== Impact ==
At 3 centimetres (1.2 in) in diameter, pre-decimal pennies were large enough for messages to show clearly on them. As they were made of bronze and of low value, they would have been impractical for the Bank of England to withdraw from circulation. Defaced coins were often rejected by shopkeepers, which prevented them entering circulation, lessening their impact as a propaganda tool.

Press reports of the time suggest that the suffragettes were taking inspiration from anarchists who were known to stamp coins with the words "Vive L'Anarchie". However, according to numismatist Tom Hockenhull, the defacement of money was never a major strategy, despite the attention it attracted.

One example, from the British Museum's collection, is re-engraved with the date 26 July 1913, potentially connecting to the Great Pilgrimage, a rally which concluded in Hyde Park, London, on that date.

Despite the connection to the Votes for Women campaign, no historical sources explicitly connecting these issues to the activities of the Women's Social & Political Union is known.

== Recovery ==
House clearances in the 1970s and 1980s meant that examples of these coins came back into public knowledge.

One coin, which was uncovered by a detectorist at Rievaulx Abbey, Yorkshire in the 1980s, has a hole through it and was likely worn as a pendant, or on a watch-chain or even a bracelet, during the object's use. Its presence there might be potentially connected to a recruitment rally for the Yorkshire Hussars that took place there in September 1914. The commander of the regiment was Viscount Helmsley, who was an outspoken opponent of women's suffrage. This example is also the latest of the coins, minted in 1913, which gives a likely date of defacement, as most suffragette activity ceased with the outbreak of World War I the following year.

== Legacy ==
The first display of one of these objects was in 2009 as part of the British Museum's Treasures of the World’s Cultures touring exhibition. In 2010, the coin held by the British Museum was featured as part of A History of the World in 100 Objects, a joint project between the museum and BBC Radio 4. The example held by the Fitzwilliam Museum was displayed in 2022 as part of the organisation's exhibition Defaced! Money, Conflict, Protest.

However, Hockenhull notes that while its inclusion brought a greater awareness to the coins, it also created a market for counterfeits and imitations. According to him, there are only 10 coins that can be considered true suffragette pennies. In 2011 the metal-detected find from Rievaulx was sold on ebay to a private collector in San Francisco for £143.59. Other authenticated examples are also in private collections.

In 2022 a piece of silverware was discovered as part of a house clearance in Fochabers, Scotland which has an unauthenticated penny attached to the base.

== Authenticated examples in museum collections ==
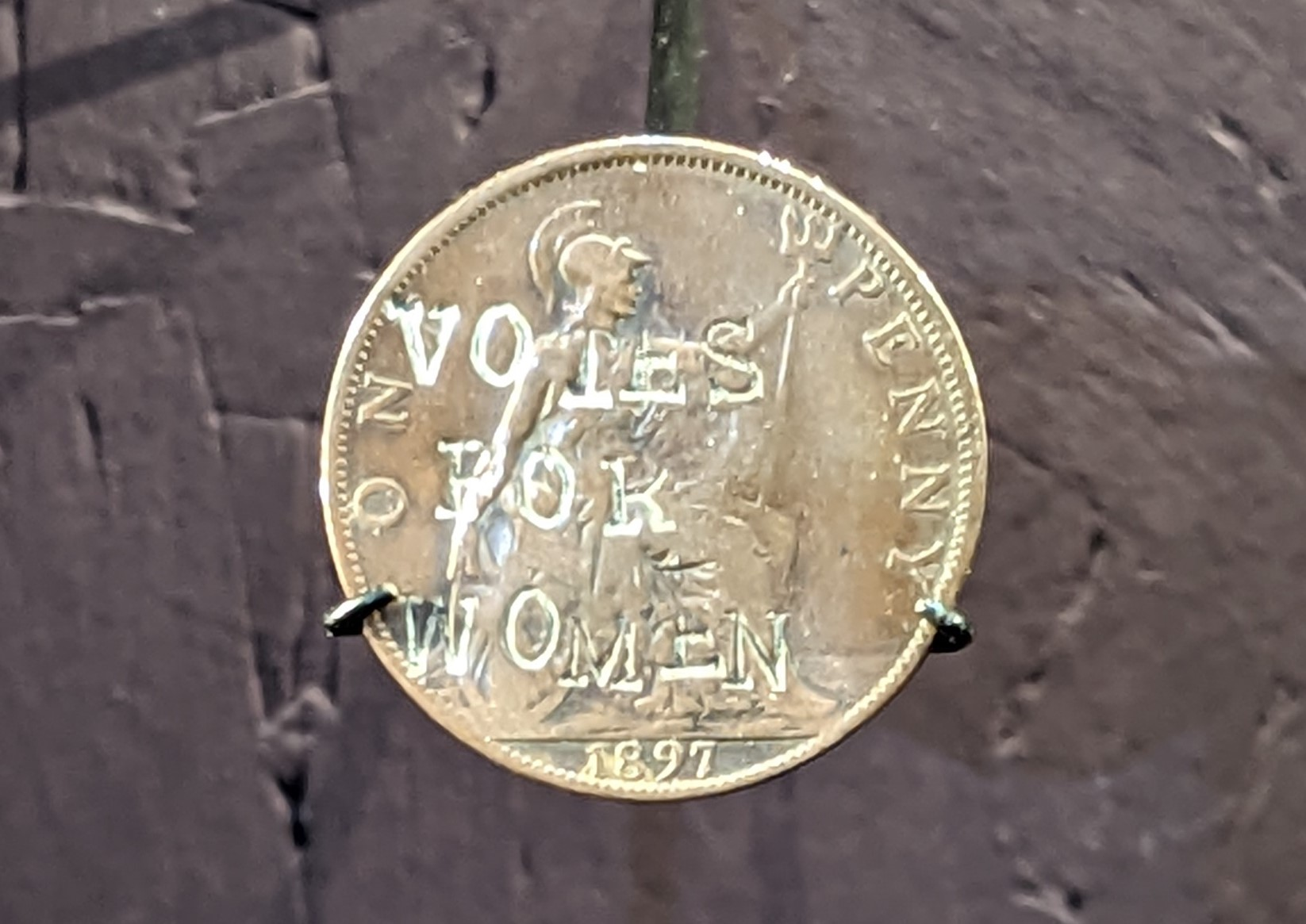
Suffragette penny - Fitzwilliam Museum

- Countermarked issue of 1897 penny - Fitzwilliam Museum, Cambridge
- Countermarked issue of 1903 penny - British Museum, London

== See also ==
- Hunger Strike Medal
