= Bertram Mapunda =

Tanzanian archaeometallurgist

- Born: 26 September 1957 (age 69); Lituhi, Tanganyika Territory
- Occupations: Archaeologist, college principal
- Known for: Discovered iron smelting furnaces in south-western Tanzania
- Spouse: Victoria Mbunda
- Children: David & Devotha Mapunda

Academic background
- Education: University of Dar es Salaam, University of Florida

Academic work
- Sub-discipline: Archaeometallurgy
- Institutions: Jordan University College, University of Dar es Salaam

Bertram B. B. Mapunda (born 26 September 1957) is an archaeometallurgist and professor of anthropology and history at Jordan University College, Tanzania, since October 2017. He is also principal of the college. He discovered the short, convectional iron smelting furnaces of south-western Tanzania.

== Early life and education ==
Bertram Mapunda was born on 26 September 1957 in Lituhi, Ruvuma, Tanzania, to Baltasar and Marciana (Mahundi) Mapunda. He married Victoria Martin in 1992. They have two children.

He received his BA from the University of Dar es Salaam, Tanzania, in 1989, and his MA and PhD from the University of Florida in 1991 and 1995 respectively.

== Career ==
Mapunda is an archaeometallurgist and professor of anthropology and history at Jordan University College, Tanzania, since October 2017. He is also principal of the college. He was previously at the University of Dar es Salaam. He is credited with the discovery of the short, convectional iron smelting furnaces of south-western Tanzania.

== Selected publications ==
- "The Role of Archaeology in Development: The Case of Tanzania". Transafrican Journal of History. 20: 19–34. 1991. JSTOR 24520301.
- Schmidt, Peter R; Mapunda, Bertram B (1997). "Ideology and the Archaeological Record in Africa: Interpreting Symbolism in Iron Smelting Technology". Journal of Anthropological Archaeology. 16: 73. doi:10.1006/jaar.1997.0305.
- Salvaging Tanzania's Cultural Heritage. Dar es Salaam University Press, Dar es Salaam, 2005. (With Paul Msemwa) ISBN 9789976604030
- Dar es Salaam's Top Twenty Tourist Attractions. Bertram Mapunda, Dar es Salaam, 2010.
- Mapunda, Bertram (2013). "The Appearance and Development of Metallurgy South of the Sahara". The Oxford Handbook of African Archaeology. doi:10.1093/oxfordhb/9780199569885.013.0042.
- Lyaya, Edwinus C; Mapunda, Bertram B (2014). "Metallurgy in Tanzania". Encyclopaedia of the History of Science, Technology, and Medicine in Non-Western Cultures. p. 1. doi:10.1007/978-94-007-3934-5_9963-1. ISBN 978-94-007-3934-5.
