= Capital of Sri Lanka =

Capitals of Sri Lanka

The current legislative capital of Sri Lanka is Sri Jayawardenepura Kotte and the executive and judicial capital is Colombo. Over the course of the island's history, the national capital has been in several locations.

== List of capitals ==
The following is a list of cities which have historically served as the capital city of Sri Lanka and its predecessor states.

=== Mythological ===
- Abhayanagara, unknown. Capital of Abhaya, King of Sri Lanka (then known as Ojadīpa) in the time of Kakusandha Buddha.
- Sirīsavatthu, until 543 BC

=== Historical ===
==== Pre-Anuradhapura period (543–377 BC) ====
- Tambapaṇṇī, 543 BC–505 BC
- Upatissagāma, 505 BC–504 BC
- Vijithapura, 504–474 BC
- Upatissagāma, 474 BC–438 BC
- Anurādhapura, 438 BC–437 BC

==== Anuradhapura period (437 BC–1017) ====
- Anurādhapura, 437 BC–7th century AD, 7th century–667, 683–772, 777–797, 801–833, 853–1029
  - Sigiriya, (Note: Also known as Sīhagiri) 473–491 (During the reign of Kassapa I (473–491))
  - Polonnaruwa, (Note: Also known as Pulatthipura, Pulatthinagara, Jananathapura by the Colas, Vijayarajapura and Parakkamapura) 667–683 (During the reign of Aggabodhi IV (667–683))
  - Polonnaruwa, 772–777 (During the reign of Aggabodhi VII (772–777))
  - Polonnaruwa, 797–801 (During the reign of Udaya I (797–801))
  - Polonnaruwa, 833–853 (During the reign of Sena I (833–853))

==== Polonnaruwa period (1017–1232) ====
- Chola conquest of Anuradhapura
  - Polonnaruwa, 1029–1055 (Chola)
  - Rohana, 1029–1055 (Sinhalese)
- Polonnaruwa period
  - Polonnaruwa (Note: Also known as Vijayarajapura), 1055–1232

==== Transitional period (1232–1597) ====
- Polonnaruwa, 1232–1255
- Dambadeniya, 1255–1270s (During the reigns of Vijayabahu III (1232–1236), Parakramabahu II (1236–1270), Vijayabahu IV (1270–1272) and part of Bhuvanaikabahu I (1272–1284))
- Yapahuwa, 1270s–1284 (Part of the reign of Bhuvanaikabahu I (1272–1284))
- Polonnaruwa, 1287–1293 (During the reign of Parakramabahu III (1287–1293))
- Kurunegala, 13th century–14th century (During the reigns of Bhuvanaikabahu II (1293–1302) and Parakramabahu IV (1302–1326))
- Gampola, (Note: Also known as Gaṅgāsiripura) 1341–1356 (During the reign of Bhuvanaikabahu IV (1341–1351) and part of the reign of Parakramabahu V (1344–1359))
- Dedigama, 1356–1359 (During the co-reigns of Parakramabahu V and Vikramabahu III (1356–1359))
- Gampola, 1359–1374 (Part of the reign of Vikramabahu III (1356–1374) and part of the reign of Bhuvanaikabahu V (1371–1408))
- Kotte (Note: Also earlier known as Jayawardhanapura), 1371–1597 (During the reign of Bhuvanaikabahu V (1371–1408)), capital of the Kingdom of Kotte)
  - Rayigama, 1411–1414 (During the early part of the reign of Parakramabahu VI (1411–1466))

==== Kandyan period (1597–1815) ====
- Kandy, 1597–1815

==== British Ceylon period (1815–1948) ====
- Colombo, 1815–1948

==== Modern Sri Lanka (1948–present) ====
- Colombo, 1948–present (executive and judicial)
- Sri Jayawardenepura Kotte, 1982–present (legislative)

=== Others ===
==== Transitional period (1232–1597) ====
When the island was divided during the Transitional period, multiple capital cities existed at one time.

- Nallur, 1255–1620 (capital of the Jaffna Kingdom)
- Kandy, 1469–1597 (During the early part of the reign of Senasammata Vikramabahu (1469–1511), capital of the Kingdom of Kandy)
- Raigampura, 1521–1538 (capital of the Kingdom of Raigama)
- Sitawaka, 1521–1594 (capital of the Kingdom of Sitawaka)
