= Rajarata =

Historical region of Sri Lanka

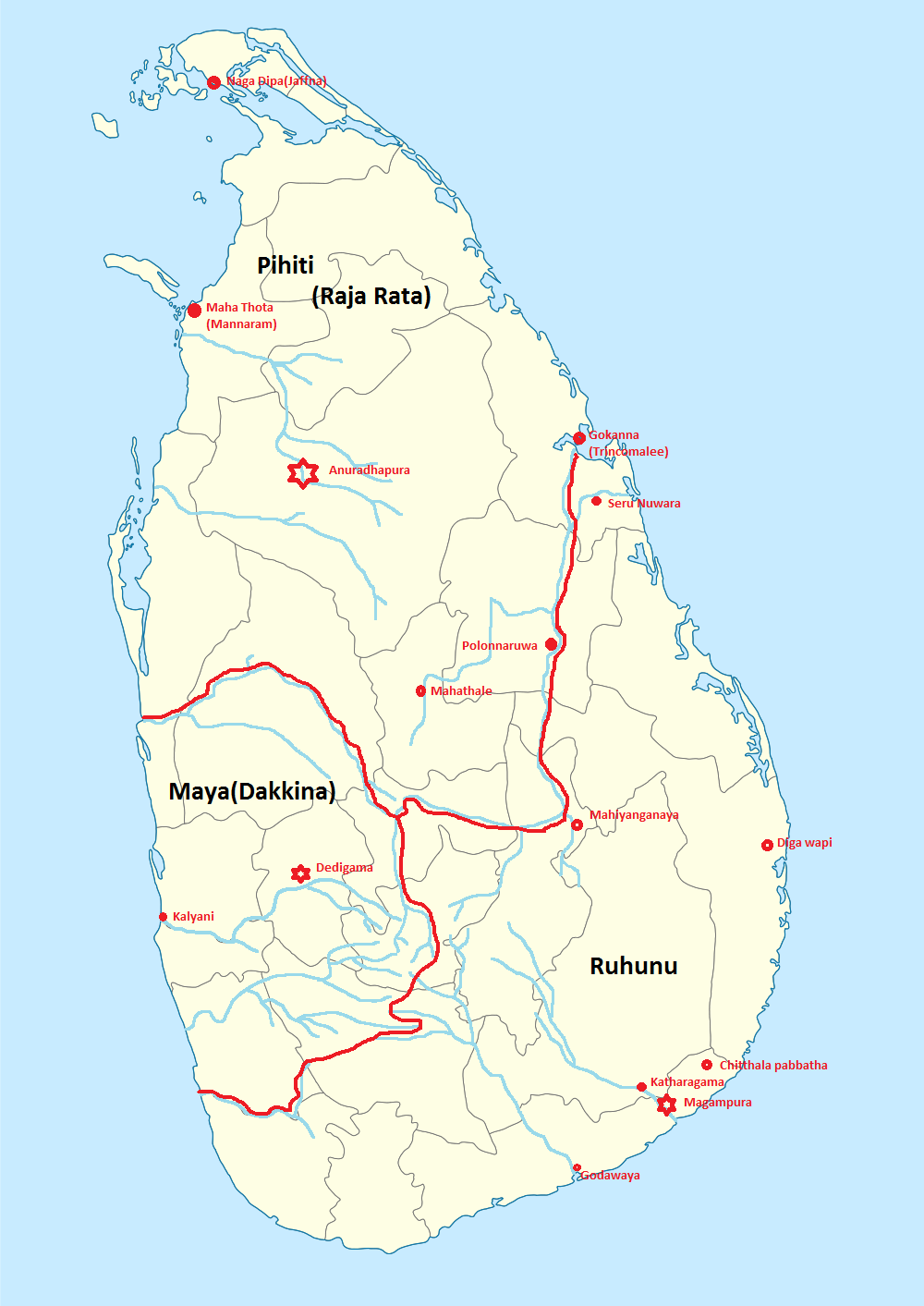
Thun Sinhale (Three Divisions of the island)

Raja Rata Malaya Rata Ruhunu Rata

Rajarata (Sinhala: රජරට, romanized: rajaraṭa (IPA: [rad͡ʒəraʈə]); Tamil: ரஜரட, romanized: rajaraṭa; meaning "King's country") was one of three historical regions of the island of Sri Lanka for about 1,700 years from the 6th century BCE to the early 13th century CE. Several ancient cities, including Tambapanni, Upatissa Nuwara, Anuradhapura and Polonnaruwa, were established as capitals within the area by successive rulers. Rajarata was under the direct administration of the King (raja/king, rata/country). Two other areas, Mayarata and Ruhunurata, were ruled by the king's brothers "Mapa" and "Epa" . The Magha invasion in the 13th century brought about the end of the Rajarata kingdom.

== History and kingdoms ==
The first kingdom in Rajarata was established by Prince Vijaya in 543 BCE. He settled near the delta of the Malvathu River between Chilaw and Mannar. According o a local myth, Prince Vijaya married a local princess, Kuveni, to gain control of Rajarata. With her help, he betrayed and killed all of the regional leaders. After his death, the administrative center was moved to the countryside along the Malvathu Oya. The river was ideal for agriculture. The first three administrative centres Tambapanni, Upatissa Nuwara, and Anuradhapura, were situated close to the Malvathu Oya. King Pandukabhaya, once a prince descended from local Yaksha and Sinha tribes, formed a stable kingdom in Anuradhapura. He garnered support from tribes in different areas of the island.

Administrative centres in Rajarata:

1. Tambapanni - Prince Vijaya - Founded in 543 BCE
2. Upatissa Nuwara - Founded by King Upatissa in 505 BCE
3. Anuradhapura - Founded by King Pandukabhaya in 377 BCE
4. Sigiriya - Built by King Kashyapa (477 – 495 CE), but after the death of the king center moved to Anuradhapura
5. Polonnaruwa - Founded by King Vijayabahu I

== Settlements ==
Prince Vijaya and his clan settled in Tambapanni, near the Malvatu Oya delta. According to Mahavamsa, various groups came from India in the period between Prince Vijaya and King Pandukabhaya's reign, frequently settling along the Malvathu Oya. In 377 BCE, King Pandukabhaya moved the administrative centre to Anuradhapura. Most of the settlements were located near rivers and reservoirs. Water was used for agricultural purposes. According to the Yodha wewa area in Mannar District by King Dhatusena, Eropathana in Vavuniya District, Padawiya area in Anuradhapura District and Mullaitivu District by King Moggallana II the extent of Sri Lanka's golden civilization spread to the southern boundary of the Vanni forest. The thick Vanni forest acted as a barrier to colonizers above the southern border of the forest. Tanks built during the Anuradhapura era (Giant's, Padaviya, Minneriya, Kantale, Mahavillachchiya, Thabbowa, Kala) are proof of the early settlements in Rajarata area.

Initial settlements based near rivers:

- Malvathu oya - Anuradhapura, Upatissa nuwara, Tambapanni
- Mahaweli river - Pollonnaruwa
- Deduru oya - Sigiriya, Yapahuwa

== Boundaries ==
Boundaries of the three divisions (Rata):

- Raja rata - Area between Deduru oya and the Mahaweli river
- Ruhunu rata - Area between the Mahaweli river and Kalu gaga
- Malaya rata - Area between Deduru oya and Kalu gaga

== Fall of Rajarata ==
In 1215, Kalinga Magha invaded Rajarata with an army of 24,000 soldiers. After the conquest of Rajarata, Magha established his capital in Pollonnaruwa. Then the Kalinga forces extended their power to the Malaya Rata. During the rise of the Kingdom of Dambadeniya under the king Vijayabahu III (1220-1224 CE), Magha lost the control of Malaya Rata. The native Sinhalese resisted the Magha's administration at Pollonnaruwa. The Sinhalese gathered around inaccessible towns, fortresses and mountains including Yapahuwa and Gangadoni under army generals including Subha and Sankha. Because of the rising threat, Pandyan troops established an administration centre in Jaffna Peninsula which was more secure and isolated by the impenetrable Vanni forest. Later Rajarata was annexed by king Parakramabahu II(1236–70). His power extended over Rohana, the central hills, Rajarata and the Vanni but failed to capture the Jaffna Kingdom.

The Sinhalese tried to re-establish the administrative centre in Rajarata but this never happened because of constant battles with invaders from south India. The administration centre was moved away from Rajarata by the Sinhalese. The defeat of Pandyan in South India in the rising Mogul empires weakened the Tamil power in Sri Lanka. The last Pandyan ruler of Madurai, was defeated and expelled in 1323 by Malik Kafur, the army general of the Muslim empire Delhi Sultanate. The falling of Pandyan was a historical event that had a big impact for Sri Lanka.

It leads to following events:

- Military rulers "Aryacakravarti" - who was appointed as minister of Pandyan empire - made the Jaffna administrative center independent from Pandyans and established the Jaffna kingdom and Arya Chakrawarthi dynasty.
- Some of the Tamils in the Vanni region withdrew from Vanni to the Jaffna Peninsula. While the rest of the Tamils formed Vanni chieftaincies that would border the Jaffna Kingdom and the remoter areas of the eastern coast, north western coast outside of the southern kingdom.
- Area below Vanni forest stabilized under Sinhala Kingdom as in the face of repeated South Indian invasions the Sinhalese monarchy and people retreated into the hills of the wet zone, further and further south, seeking primarily security. The capital was abandoned and moved to Dambadeniya by Vijayabāhu III establishing the Dambadeniya era of the Sinhalese kingdom.

Also, ancient Rajarata (before the 13th century) was divided into three parts:

- Jaffna kingdom - Jaffna Peninsula. This was ruled by the Arya Chakrawarthi dynasty.
- Rajarata - Area below the Vanni. This area was ruled by the Sinhalese kingdoms.
- Vanni Area - The heavily forested land was a collection of chieftaincies of principalities that were a collective buffer zone between the Jaffna Kingdom, in the north of Sri Lanka, and the Sinhalese kingdoms in the south.Sinhalese chieftaincies in Vanni Area would lay on the northern border of the Sinhalese kingdom while the Tamil chieftaincies would border the Jaffna Kingdom and the remoter areas of the eastern coast, north western coast outside of the control of either kingdom.

== See also ==
- Rajarata University of Sri Lanka
