= House of Siri Sanga Bo =

Sri Lankan dynasty (1220–1597)

House of Siri Sanga Bo සිරි සඟ බෝ රාජ වංශය
- Flag of Sitawaka Kingdom
- Parent house: House of Lambakanna I
- Country: Kingdom of Dambadeniya; Kingdom of Gampola; Kingdom of Kotte; Kingdom of Raigama; Kingdom of Sitawaka; Kingdom of Kandy
- Founded: 1220
- Founder: Vijayabahu III of Dambadeniya
- Current head: No
- Final ruler: Rajasinha I of Sitawaka
- Titles: King of Dambadeniya; King of Gampola; King of Kotte; King of Raigama; King of Sitawaka; King of Kandy
- Dissolution: 1597

House of Siri Sanga Bo was a powerful dynasty which ruled parts of Sri Lanka from Vijayabahu III of Dambadeniya (1220–1224) until Rajasinha I of Sitawaka (1581–1591). Vijayabahu III of Dambadeniya defeated Kalinga Magha's armies from Maya Rata and established his fortress at Dambadeniya. This dynasty was able to protect their independence by facing so many foreign invasions until late 13th century and Pandyan expedition plundered the fortress of Subhagiri (Yapahuwa) and returned with the Relic of the tooth of the Buddha. This expedition took place near the end of the Sri Lankan king Bhuvanaikabâhu I's reign (1272-1285 CE). Bhuvanaika Bahu's successor Parâkkamabâhu III went on a personal embassy to Kulasekaran's court and persuaded him to return the relic. So there can be said that king Parakramabhahu faced heavy problems at the moment on the sitting throne. So there could conclude that after solving the majority of problems he had taken the throne officially after a coronation. This can show by a Tamil poem called Sarajoti Malai which was recited at King Parakramabhahu III in May A.D.1310 which was the seventh year after his coronation. Then it can be said his reign was started in A.D.1302 or A.D.1303. In the meantime can be taken as a turbulent period in Sri Lanka. It can also be said that a large part of Sri Lanka has become part of the Pandyan Empire. They had to change their capital city to Dambadeniya, Yapahuwa and Kurunagala because of continuous invasions from southern India.

== Rise of Dambadeniya ==
In the reign of Kalinga Magha, native Sinhala people moved to south and Maya Rata because of his remorseless governance in Kingdom of Polonnaruwa. Meanwhile, this reign, a descendant of King Sirisangabo called "Vijayabahu III", fought against Kalinga Magha's armies and became the king of Dambadeniya. He obtained Lord Buddha's tooth relic and alms chalice to Dambadeniya from the place which Magha's people had buried them in Kotmale. He helped to reconstruct the destroyed Buddhist dispensation. He was the founder of the House of Siri Sanga Bo.

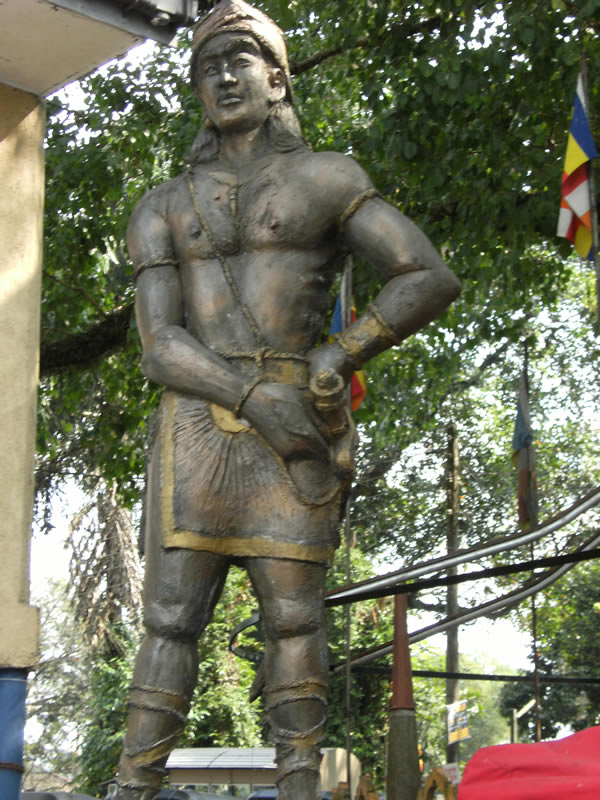
Rajasinha I of Sitawaka (Prince Tikiri Bandara)

== The decline of the Kingdom of Sitawaka ==
The Last King of this dynasty was Rajasinha I of Sitawaka. He was a warrior and a great king of Sitawaka. He was also the son of Mayadunne. Later, he designated a South Indian, called "Aritta Kivendu" (Mannamperuma Mohottala) as his chief advisor. Kivendu influenced him to be converted to Hinduism. Rajasinha was advised by Kivendu to destroy significant Buddhist sites such as Sigiriya and Sri pada. These attacks caused to a discontent among Buddhist people and prelates about the king. It was one of the main reasons of the decline of the Kingdom of Sitawaka and House of Siri Sanga Bo. Because of his actions Buddhists led a rebellion against Rajasinha. He suppressed the rebellion and the leaders who supported the rebellion were caught. Most of them were Buddhist prelates. Over hundreds of Buddhist monks (with the chief prelate of Sitawaka) were killed by Rajasinha. These acts created a huge resentment among the Buddhists and the King.

After the annexation of Kandy, Rajasinha killed "Weerasundara Bandara", his agent (Samantha) of Kandy. Weerasundara Bandara's son escaped to Portuguese army in Mannar from Sitawaka. His name was Konappu Bandara. Later, he returned to Kandy and rebelled against Rajasinha with the help of Portuguese army. He captured Kandy from Rajasinha and became the King of Kandy. Even though, Rajasinha didn't stop his attempts to recapture Kandy. The last attempt of Rajasinha (Battle of Balana) was defeated by Konappu Bandara. While he was returning from Balana, he was wounded by a pointed bamboo segment and died at the garden of Pethangoda in March 1592. Rajasinha had no heirs to the throne of Sitawaka. His kingdom was sacked by Konappu Bandara (Vimaladharmasuriya I of Kandy) and the Portuguese.

== Monarchs of House of Siri Sanga Bo ==
=== Kingdom of Dambadeniya (1220–1345) ===
Portrait	Name	Birth	Death	King From	King Until	Relationship with Predecessor(s)
	Vijayabahu III	-	-	1220	1224	*A patriotic Prince of Sinhala Royal blood
	Parakkamabahu II	-	-	1234	1269	*Eldest son of Vijaya Bahu III
	Vijayabahu IV	-	October 1270	1267/8	October 1270	*Eldest son of Panditha Parakrama Bahu II
	Bhuvanaikabahu I (from Yapahuwa)	-	-	1271	1283	*Brother of Vijaya Bahu IV
	Interregnum	-	-	1283	1302	
	Parakkamabahu III (from Polonnaruwa)	-	-	1302	1310	*Nephew of Buvaneka Bahu I *Son of Vijaya Bahu IV
	Bhuvanaikabahu II (from Kurunagala)	-	-	1310	1325/6	*Son of Buvaneka Bahu I *Cousin of Parakrama Bahu III
	Parakkamabahu IV (from Kurunagala)	-	-	1325/6	1325/6	*Son of Buvanekka Bahu II
	Bhuvanaikabahu III (from Kurunagala)	-	-	1325/6	1325/6	*Known as Vanni Buvaneka Bahu
	Vijayabahu V (from Kurunagala)	-	-	1325/6	1344/5	*Second son of Chandra Banu of Jaffnapatnam

=== Kingdom of Gampola (1345–1412) ===
Portrait	Name	Birth	Death	King From	King Until	Relationship with Predecessor(s)
	Bhuvanaikabahu IV	-	-	1344/5	1353/4	*Son of Vijaya Bahu V
	Parakkamabahu V (from Dedigama)	1311	-	1344/5	1359	*Son of Vijaya Bahu V *Brother of Buvaneka Bahu IV
	Vikramabahu III	-	-	1357	1374	*Son of Buvaneka Bahu IV
	Bhuvanaikabahu V	-	-	1372/3	1391/2	*Nissanka Alakeswara's son by the sister of Vikrama Bahu III
	Vira Bahu II	-	-	1391/2	1397	*Brother in law of King Buvaneka Bahu V
	Son of Vira Bahu II	-	-	1397	1397	*Son of Vira Bahu II
	Son of Vira Bahu II	-	-	1397	1397	*Son of Vira Bahu II
	Vira Alakesvara (a.k.a. Vijaya Bahu VI)	-	-	1397	1409	
	Parakrama Bahu Epa	-	-	1409	1412	*Grandson of Senalankadhikara Senevirat minister of Bhuvanaikabâhu IV.

=== Kingdom of Kotte (1412–1597) ===
Portrait	Name	Birth	Death	King From	King Until	Relationship with Predecessor(s)
	Parakramabahu VI	-	-	1412	1467	*Son of Vijaya Bahu VI and his Queen Sunetra Devi; *Or the third son of Chandra Banu of Yapa Patuna (Jaffnapatnam)
	Jayabahu II (Vira Parakrama Bahu VII)	-	-	1467	1472	*Son of Parakrama Bahu II's natural daughter, Ulakudaya Devi
	Bhuvanekabahu VI (a.k.a. Sapumal Kumara)	-	-	1472	1480	*Son of Parakrama Bahu VI
	Parakramabahu VII	-	-	1480	1484	
	Vira Parakramabahu VIII (a.k.a. Ambulugala Kumara)	-	-	1484	1518	*Ambulagala Kumara; *Son of Parakrama Bahu VI
	Dharma Parakramabahu IX (from Kelaniya)	-	-	1509	1528	*Son of Vira Parakrama Bahu VIII
	Vijayabahu VI	-	1521	1509	1521	*Brother of Dharma Parakrama Bahu IX; *Rajah of Menik Kadavara
	Bhuvanekabahu VII	-	1551	1521	1551	*Eldest son of Vijaya Bahu
	Dharmapala (a.k.a. Dom Joaõ Dharmapala)	-	May 27, 1597	1551	May 27, 1597	*Grandson and heir of Bhuvanekabãhu VII

=== Kingdom of Raigama (1521–1538) ===
Portrait	Name	Birth	Death	King From	King Until	Relationship with Predecessor(s)
	Pararajasinha (a.k.a. Raigam Bandara)	-	1538	1521	1538	*Brother of Mayadunne; *Son of Vijaya Bahu VI

=== Kingdom of Sitawaka (1521–1593) ===
Portrait	Name	Birth	Death	King From	King Until	Relationship with Predecessor(s)
	Mayadunne	1501	1581	1521	1581	*Brother of Bhuvaneka Bahu VII; *Son of Vijaya Bahu VI
	Rajasinha I (a.k.a. Tikiri Banda)	1544	1592	1581	1592	*Son of Mayadunne
	Rajasuriya	-	1593	1592	1593	*Son of Rajasinha I
	Nikapitiye Bandara	1588	1608/1611	1593	1594	

== See also ==
- Vijayabahu III of Dambadeniya
- Kingdom of Dambadeniya
- Rajasinha I of Sitawaka
- Sitawaka
- Battle of Balana
- Vimaladharmasuriya I of Kandy
