= Parakramabahu II =

King of Dambadeniya in 1236

Panditha Parakramabahu II පණ්ඩිත පරාක්‍රමබාහු
- Kalikāla Sāhitya Sarvajña Paṇḍita (All-knowing scholar of literature)
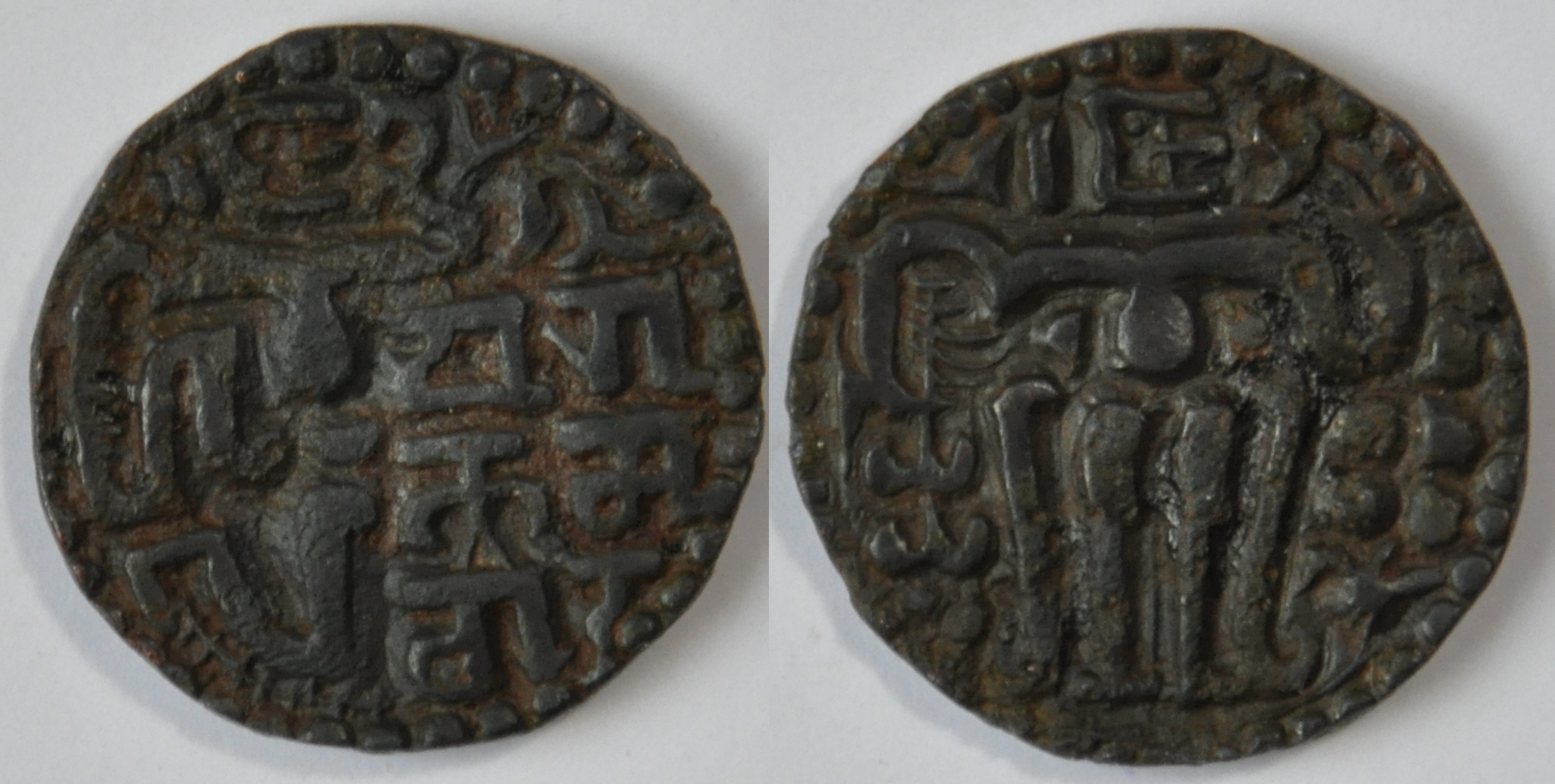
- Massa coin of Parakramabahu II

King of Dambadeniya
- Reign: 1236-1270
- Coronation: 1236
- Predecessor: Vijayabahu III
- Successor: Vijayabahu IV
- Born: Sirivardhanapura
- Died: 1270
- Spouse: Queen Giruva Devi of Ramachandra Brahmin clan
- Issue: Vijayabahu IV; Bhuvanaikabahu I
Names
- Śrī Kalikāla Sāhitya Sarvajña Paṇḍita Parākramabāhu
- House: House of Siri Sanga Bo
- Father: Vijayabahu III
- Religion: Theravada Buddhism

Parakramabahu II, also known as Panditha Parakramabāhu (Sinhala: පණ්ඩිත පරාක්‍රමබාහු), was the King of Dambadeniya in 13th century, whose reign lasted from 1236 to 1270. As a pioneer in literature, he was bestowed with the honorary title "Kalikala Sahitya Sarvagna Pandita". Parakramabahu's reign is notable for the creation of numerous Sinhalese literal works such as, Kausilumina, Pūjāvaliya, Pāli Vishuddḥi Mārgaya, Thūpavaṃsa and Sidhath Sangarāva. He launched a campaign against the Eastern Ganga invader Kalinga Magha, and successfully expelled him from Polonnaruwa Kingdom but Kalinga Magha continued to rule the Jaffna Kingdom. He succeeded his father Vijayabahu III as King of Dambadeniya, and was succeeded by his elder son, Vijayabahu IV, after his death.

== Life before kingship ==
Parakramabahu II was born in Sirivardhanapura, as mentioned in the chronicle Pujavaliya, to king Vijayabahu III of Dambadeniya. Following Vijayabahu, this king is regarded as the second monarch of the House of Siri Sanga Bo.

According to a popular legend, the day after the birth of Parakramabahu II, his mother (also the chief royal consort of Vijayabahu III) died and the king remarried a Muhammadan, and not long after, a son named Wattimi was born to the concubine.

Amidst the objections by the Buddhist monks and ministers of the royal court, the concubine (the prince's mother) planned to kill prince Parakramabahu, the true heir to the Sinhalese throne, to let Wattimi proclaim kingship. Aware of the threat, the king secretly handed over prince Parakramabahu to a village resident through his ministers, and Parakramabahu grew up in the village, which is also thought to be the reason for his patronage of literature.

After the death of Vijayabahu III, Wattimi usurps the throne of Dambadeniya, but his rule turns out to be unpopular, and the chiefs of the Sinhalese court soon lured him to a high place at Kurunegala threw him over the precipice. His tomb, in the hands of the Muhammadans, was venerated also by the Sinhala, to whom he is known as Gale Bandara.

The royal elephant of the kingdom was used to trace Parakramabahu, as the ministers believed that the elephant would worship their true heir as an act of identification. This legend mentions that after searching throughout the village, the elephant recognized Parakramabahu, who was then fully grown-up as an adult and had forgotten his true identity.

Parakramabahu II was crowned as the second king of Dambadeniya after the incident in 1236.

== Reign in Dambadeniya and Campaign against Magha ==
Parakramabahu's first act after his coronation was to build a Temple of the Tooth in his kingdom. At the ceremony of depositing the Tooth Relic of the Buddha, he promised to save the country from the cruel invader named Kalinga Magha (a.k.a. Gangaraja Kalinga Vijayabahu). Due to this, the people of the country, including the Buddhist monks, became very enlightened about Parakramabahu II.

While preparing for the battle, the king had to face another invasion in his eleventh year (1244-1245), by a Javaka or Malay ruler named Chandrabhanu from the Tambralinga kingdom of Southeast Asia. The reason Chandrabhanu invaded Sri Lanka is uncertain, but historians suggest that he invaded the politically fragmented island in the aim of claiming the relic of the Tooth of the Buddha.

Although Chandrabhanu's initial invasion of the country wasn't a success, he settled in the North of Sri Lanka with an aim of re-invading the island.

Parakramabahu II successfully pushed Kalinga Magha out of Polonnaruwa by 1244, Chandrabhanu fled to Jaffna kingdom and secured the throne from Kalinga Magha. The fate of Magha after his withdrawal to Jaffna kingdom remains unknown.

== Malay invasions ==
Parakramabahu II had to face two Malay invasions in his reign; the first one occurred in 1244, led-by Chandrabhanu of Tambralinga. The invasion was successfully repulsed. However, Chandrabhanu settled in the North (present-day Jaffna) with an intent to re-invade Dambadeniya. He adopted the regnal name 'Srīdḥarmarāja' and re-constructed Buddhist temples in the region.

Although not mentioned in historical chronicles, there's solid evidence that a huge Pandyan invasion, launched by Sadayavarman Sundara, occurred sometime between the years 1254 and 1256. Dambadeniya wasn't much affected, but Chandrabhanu had to submit his territory of Jaffna to Pandya rule as a vassal.

Despite the invasions, Chandrabhanu gathered a large army of Sinhalese and Tamils and launched an invasion to the South, but this time Parakramabahu II sided with the Pandyas and he was defeated and killed in the war. Panditha Parakramabahu was able to annex large parts of the North to his kingdom, while the region of Jaffna remained under the rule of Chandrabhanu's son, Savakanmaindan.

== Contributions to Sinhala literature ==
Parakramabahu II's reign is regarded as a golden age of Sinhalese literature, and Parakramabahu himself too was a patron in poetry and literature. He was popularly known as 'Kalikāla Sāhitya Sarvagna Paṇḍitha' or 'Panditha Parakramabahu'. The king's inspiration for Sinhalese culture is thought to have sparked during his childhood in the village.

The government under Parakramabahu II gave full sponsorship to works of literature, and thus, Several major literal works such as, Kausilumina, Pūjāvaliya, Pāli Vishuddḥi Mārgaya, Thūpavaṃsa and Sidhath Sangarāva were published during the time.

Anavamadarshin alias Anomadassi wrote the Sanskrit-language astrological treatise Daivajna-Kamadhenu during his reign.

== Death ==
Having reigned for thirty-three years, Panditha Parakramabahu II abdicated in favor of his son Vijayabahu IV in 1269 and died around a year later, in 1270.

== Dambadeniya after Parakramabahu II's reign ==
Parakramabahu II was succeeded by his son Vijayabahu IV. He was a very kind-hearted ruler, and made numerous contributions to Buddhism. Thus, he was popularly known as Bosath Vijayabahu. Two years after his reign, a general named Mittha, who was about to become king, bribed a slave and had him assassinated. Historical chronicles state that Prince Bhuvanaikabahu, the younger brother of King Vijayabahu IV, then went to Yapahuwa with the suspicion that he too would die.

Then a valiant general named Dhakura, who had served King Vijayabahu, raised a question about his salary and cut off Mitta's head with his sword. Then he invited king Bhuvanaikabahu I to Dambadeniya and crowned him as the Sinhalese king.

Bhuvanaikabahu I went to Yapahuwa, not long after his coronation and established the city as the capital of Sri Lanka. It is said that during the last years of this king, Maravarman Kulasekara Pandyan I, who was the Pandyan emperor during the time, sent a Tamil minister named Kulasekara Cinkaiariyan and plundered the villages in the North and abducted the Tooth Relic in Yapahuwa.

To further establish Tamil hard power and influence in the region, Maravarman Kulasekara installed the Tamil minister Kulasekaran Cinkaiariyan, an Aryachakravarthi as the king of Jaffna. The line of kings started from this ruler evolved as the Aryachakravarthi dynasty which ruled Jaffna until 1619.

After a nineteen-year interregnum, King Parakramabahu III was crowned as king of Dambadeniya. He maintained friendly relations with Kulasekara Pandyan, sent a personal embassy and persuaded him to return the Tooth relic. Parakramabahu III was the last Sinhalese monarch to use Polonnaruwa as the country's capital.

According to historical chronicles, Bhvanaikabahu II, the son of Bhuvanaikabahu I of Dambadeniya, moved the capital of Sri Lanka to Kurunegala and continue to rule the country until the city was abandoned and the capital moved to Gampola.

== In popular culture ==
- The 2013 film, Siri Parakum, emphasized the life of Parakkamabahu II until the beginning of his reign. Akila Dhanuddhara stars as Parakramabahu II in the film. The film was directed by Somaratne Dissanayake.

== See also ==
- List of Sri Lankan monarchs
- History of Sri Lanka
- Transitional Period

Parakramabahu II House of Siri Sanga Bo Born: ? ? Died: ? 1270
Regnal titles
| Preceded by Vijayabahu III | King of Dambadeniya; 1234–1269 | Succeeded by Vijayabahu IV |
