= Siri Parakum =

- Sinhala: සිරි පැරකුම්
- Directed by: Somaratne Dissanayake
- Written by: Somaratne Dissanayake
- Based on: Early chronicles of Parakramabahu II
- Produced by: Renuka Balasooriya
- Starring: Akila Dhanuddhara; Senali Fonseka; Bimal Jayakody
- Cinematography: Palitha Perera
- Edited by: Ajith Ramanayake
- Music by: Rohana Weerasinghe
- Production company: Cine Films
- Release date: 30 May 2013
- Country: Sri Lanka
- Language: Sinhala
- Box office: 36 SL Crores

Siri Parakum (Sinhala: සිරි පැරකුම්) is a 2013 Sri Lankan Sinhala epic biographical film directed by Somaratne Dissanayake and produced by Renuka Balasooriya. It stars two newcomers Akila Dhanuddhara and Senali Fonseka in lead roles along with Bimal Jayakody and Chandani Seneviratne. Music composed by veteran music director Rohana Weerasinghe.

The film has influenced on the urban legends and other historical writings of the childhood and ascending to throne of King Parakramabahu the Second who ruled Dambadeniya Kingdom. It is the 1244th Sri Lankan film in the Sinhala cinema. The film has mostly positive reviews from the critics.

== Plot ==
King Vijayabahu III of Dambadeniya had Prince Parakramabahu from his first queen. She died on the day her son was born. So the king married a Non-Buddhist princess; they have a son named Waththiya, to whom the queen wants to inherit the throne, amidst the objection from Buddhist monks and senior Buddhist ministers. The king discovers that the invader from Kalinga named Magha is plundering wealth and resources while destroying villages. He goes to war with Magha keeping Prince Parakramabahu under the protection of Pathiraja Senevi. Sangharaja Thero gives a prediction that the king will receive victory and blesses the king and his army. The king also says "If I am victorious, a messenger will come with a white colour flag and I will come later. But, if I have been defeated your king will never return." and the servants agree to kill themselves if the king is defeated by jumping down from the Rock of Kurunegala.

The king leaves on the following day and the queen plans a conspiracy to kill Prince Parakramabahu with the help of the king's advisor. The king is victorious and sends the white flag to the palace. The queen sends one of her guards to kill the messenger and come with a black flag. When seeing the black colour flag, the servants jump from the rock. The queen orders Pathiraja Senevi to jump with Prince Parakramabahu, but he rescues the prince and sends him with the Dhobi mother to Kalundawa for protection. Gamarala of Kalundawa adopts him and takes good care of him considering him as his son. The king returns and is angry about what had happened and the queen pretends that it was the messengers fault and she was protecting Prince Parakramabahu. Pathiraja Senevi explains the situation to the king and he disguises as a normal soldier and goes to Kalundawa.

The secret of the prince is only known by the King, Pathiraja Senevi and the Dhobi mother. The Dhobi mother is given a chanted pendant by Pathiraja Senevi and she becomes speechless until she is allowed to remove it to prevent the story about Prince Parakramabahu's origin. Soon the prince too forgets it. He is given the name 'Appuwa'. He lives happily with his parents and their two daughters Kalu Ethana and Sirimal Ethana. Children in the village go to the temple and learn Buddhism, Sinhala, Pali, Sanskrit languages, and literature from Ven. Kalundawa Thero. Appuwa (Prince Parakramabahu) is a good student and studies along Ven. Kalundawa. His father works in the Chena. It was difficult for him to use the large mammoty and he goes to meet the blacksmith to make a small mammoty for himself. The blacksmith does not make a mammoty for him but Appuwa makes a good little mammoty all alone by himself which surprises the blacksmith.

As years passed, Appuwa is grown up and his skills surprise the people. He falls in love with Sirimal Ethana. King Vijayabahu dies due to aging and Waththiya becomes the king amidst criticism. Because of this, Pathiraja Senavi and others plan a pooja with the intention of killing Waththiya; he during the pooja, falls from a cliff and dies. After this, Ministers and everyone decide to choose next king through the royal elephant, Kandula. They decide to go over the country with Kandula, who will worship to person who will be next king. Kandula comes to village and upon recognizing, worships to Appuwa, while he and Ethana stays together in the village. Pathiraja Senavi and his followers learns that he is Prince Parakramabahu. Parakramabahu enthrones as King Parakramabahu II of Dambadeniya while Sirimal Ethana is titled as the Queen consort.

== Cast ==
- Akila Dhanuddhara as King Parakramabahu
  - Sachin Chathuranga as Teenage Parakramabahu
  - Pramuditha Udayakumara as Crown prince Parakramabahu
- Senali Fonseka as Queen Sirimal Ethana
  - Minoli Balasooriya as Teenage Sirimal Ethana
  - Tharinsa Sinhabahu as Child Sirimal Ethana
- Bimal Jayakody as Gamarala
- Jayani Senanayake as Gama Hamine
- Chandani Seneviratne as Dhobi mother
- Sinethi Akila as Kalu Ethana
  - Mihiri Deshapriya as Teenage Kalu Ethana
  - Senanga Keppetipola as Child Kalu Ethana
- Palitha Silva as King Vijayabahu III
- Sachini Ayendra as Queen Yonaka
- Ashan Dias as Pathiraja Senevi
- Giriraj Kaushalya as Ven. Kalundewa Thero
- Sampath Tennakoon as Sangharaja Thero
- Jayantha Muthuthathri as Teacher of Industries / blacksmith
- Lalith Jayakantha as Ranawatte Duraya
- Damayanthi Fonseka as Duraya's wife

== Soundtrack ==
| No. | Title | Lyrics | Singer(s) | Length |
|---|---|---|---|---|
| 1. | "Atha Matha (Pata Pata Mal)" | Somarathna Dissanayake |
| 2. | "Pipi Kusuma" |
| 3. | "Kusum Pipena Wasanthe" |
| 4. | "Kale Hadena Kiri Maduwal" | | Saman Lenin |

== See also ==
- List of Asian historical drama films
