= Pujavaliya =

Historical Sinhalese literary work

Pujavaliya (Sinhala: පුජාවලිය) is a historical Sinhalese literary work compiled by the bhikkhu Mayurapãda Buddhaputta Thero in the latter half of the 13th century, during what is considered a golden age of Sri Lankan literature. It is regarded as one of the most important prose texts of medieval Sri Lanka, both as a religious manual and as a source for understanding the cultural and historical context of the Kingdom of Dambadeniya.

== Composition ==
It is recorded that Buddhaputta Thero wrote the Pujavaliya while residing at the Pathiraja Pirivena at Palabathgala between 1266 and 1275 A.D., during the reign of Panditha Parakramabahu II. The king himself was a patron of literature and Buddhist scholarship, and his court produced several significant works, including Saddharmaratnāvaliya and Saddharmālankāraya.

== Content ==
The central theme of the Pujavaliya is said to be based on the extol Araham, one of the qualities of the Buddha known as Nava Arahadi Budu Guna (Nine epithets of the Buddha). The text contains a collection of tales related to the Buddha and his followers, moral instructions for laypeople, and reflections on karmic law.

It also records a number of episodes from Sri Lankan history and society, making it one of the main literary sources for understanding the political, religious, and social life of 13th-century Sri Lanka.

== Chapters ==
The chronicle consists of 34 chapters:

1. Pǔjãsangraha Kathã
2. Abhinihara Magul Puja Katha
3. Vivarana Magul Puja Katha
4. Bodhisambara Puja Katha
5. Jathibeda Puja Katha
6. Dwithīya Puja Katha
7. Sādhunãda Puja Katha
8. Prathisandhi Puja Katha
9. Prasava Mangala Puja Katha
10. Mahabhinikman Puja Katha
11. Bõdhimandala Puja Katha
12. Sãdhunāda or Āyāchana Pǔjã Kathã
13. Isipathanarama Pǔjã Kathã
14. Veluvanarama Pǔjã Kathã
15. Nigrodharama Pǔjã Kathã
16. Bhikshatanadi Adbhuta Pǔjã Kathã
17. Jetavanarama Pǔjã Kathã
18. Purvarama Pǔjã Kathã
19. Namaskaradi Pǔjã Kathã
20. Asadrisha Mahanama Pǔjã Kathã
21. Ganga Rohana Pǔjã Kathã
22. Divya Raja Pǔjã Kathã
23. Yamaka Pratiharya Pǔjã Kathã
24. Pandukambalasena Pǔjã Kathã
25. Devorohana Pǔjã Kathã
26. Bhiksuni Sasana Utpatthi Pratipatti Pǔjã Kathã
27. Adahana Pǔjã Kathã
28. Jivakarama Pǔjã Kathã
29. Samameth Noyek Jathibeda Pǔjã Kathã
30. Jîvithadî Pǔjã Kathã
31. Pratiharyadi Pratipatti Pǔjã Kathã
32. Uddēsika Pǔjã Kathã
33. Samyak Pratipatti Pǔjã Kathã
34. Lankadvīpa Uddēsika Pǔjã Kathã

== Legacy ==
Pujavaliya is valued for its unique contribution to Sinhala prose style and is often compared to the Saddharmaratnāvaliya. It helped establish a moral-ethical genre of Sinhala Buddhist literature that shaped the devotional and didactic works of subsequent centuries.

The work continues to be studied by historians and linguists for its insights into medieval Sinhala language development, its preservation of Buddhist doctrinal interpretation, and its role in shaping cultural memory in Sri Lanka.
