= Anavamadarshin =

13th-century Buddhist monk

Anavama-darshin (IAST: Anavamadarśin) (Note: Also known as Anavamadarśin Saṅgha-rāja, Anavamadarshi Mahathera, and Anomadassi Mahāsāmi), also known by his Pali name Anomadassi (fl. 1241 CE), was a Buddhist monk and author from Dambadeniya in present-day Sri Lanka. He is best known as the author of the Sanskrit astrological treatise Daivajna-Kamadhenu.

== Biography ==
Anavama-darshin was a Buddhist monk associated with the Hattha-vanagalla (Hasta-vanagalya) Mahavihara, a monastery located in present-day Western Province. As the leader (mahāsāmi) of this monastery, he had close contact with and received favours from king Parakramabahu II of Dambadeniya. According to Chulavamsa, the king, through his minister Devapiti-raja, commissioned the construction of a three-storey pāsāda (mansion) at the monastery, "at great cost". The king also arranged repairs to its shrines and the erection of a cetiya there.

One of Anavama-darshin's pupils, whose name is not known, wrote the Pali-language Hattha-vanagalla-vihāra-vaṃsa, a history of the monastery at his request.

== Works ==
In 1241, Anavama-darshin composed Daivajñā-Kāmadhenu, sourcing information from other authors such as Varahamihira and Bhoja-raja. This book is the most important Sanskrit-language astrological text from present-day Sri Lanka. It deals with omens, jataka, muhurta, and prashna.

Some scholars, such as Charles Godakumbura, also attribute the authorship of the Sinhalese grammar Sidat-sangara to Anavama-darshin. Paropakāra, another work attributed him is now lost.
