= Vijayabahu V =

- King of Dambadeniya
- Reign: 1325/26–1344/45
- Predecessor: Bhuvanaikabahu III
- Successor: Bhuvanaikabahu IV as King of Gampola
- Spouse: two grand daughters of Parakramabahu II
- Dynasty: House of Siri Sanga Bo
- Father: Chandrabhanu

Vijayabahu V was the last King of Dambadeniya in the 14th century, who reigned from 1325/26 to 1344/45. He succeeded Bhuvanaikabahu III as King of Dambadeniya and was succeeded by Bhuvanaikabahu IV, King of Gampola. He was also known as Savulu Vijayabahu.

== See also ==
- List of Sri Lankan monarchs
- History of Sri Lanka

Vijayabahu V House of Siri Sanga Bo Born: ? ? Died: ? ?
Regnal titles
| Preceded by Bhuvanaikabahu III | King of Dambadeniya; 1325/6–1344/5 | Succeeded by Bhuvanaikabahu IV as King of Gampola |
