= Bhuvanekabahu III =

Bhuvanaikabahu III
- King of Dambadeniya
- Reign: 1325/6
- Predecessor: Parakkamabahu IV
- Successor: Vijayabahu V
- Dynasty: House of Siri Sanga Bo

Bhuvanaikabahu III (a.k.a. Vanni Buvaneka Bahu) was King of Dambadeniya in the 14th century, who reigned in the year 1325/6. He succeeded Parakkamabahu IV as King of Dambadeniya and was succeeded by Vijayabahu V.

According to local folklore, he was also responsible for the construction of the Kurunegala Lake.

- List of Sri Lankan monarchs
- History of Sri Lanka

Bhuvanekabahu III House of Siri Sanga Bo Born: ? ? Died: ? ?
Regnal titles
Preceded by Parakkamabahu IV	King of Dambadeniya; 1325/6	Succeeded by Vijayabahu V
