= Bhuvanekabahu II =

Bhuvanaikabahu II
- King of Dambadeniya
- Reign: 1310-1325/6
- Predecessor: Parakkamabahu III
- Successor: Parakkamabahu IV
- Issue: Parakkamabahu IV
- Dynasty: House of Siri Sanga Bo
- Father: Bhuvanaikabahu I
- Religion: Theravada Buddhism

Bhuvanaikabahu II was King of Dambadeniya in the 14th century, who ruled 1310 from to 1325/6. He succeeded his cousin Parakkamabahu III as King of Dambadeniya and was succeeded by his son Parakkamabahu IV.

== See also ==
- List of Sri Lankan monarchs
- History of Sri Lanka

Bhuvanekabahu II House of Siri Sanga Bo Born: ? ? Died: ? ?
Regnal titles
Preceded by Parakkamabahu III	King of Dambadeniya; 1310–1325/6	Succeeded by Parakkamabahu IV
