= Vijayabahu IV =

- King of Dambadeniya
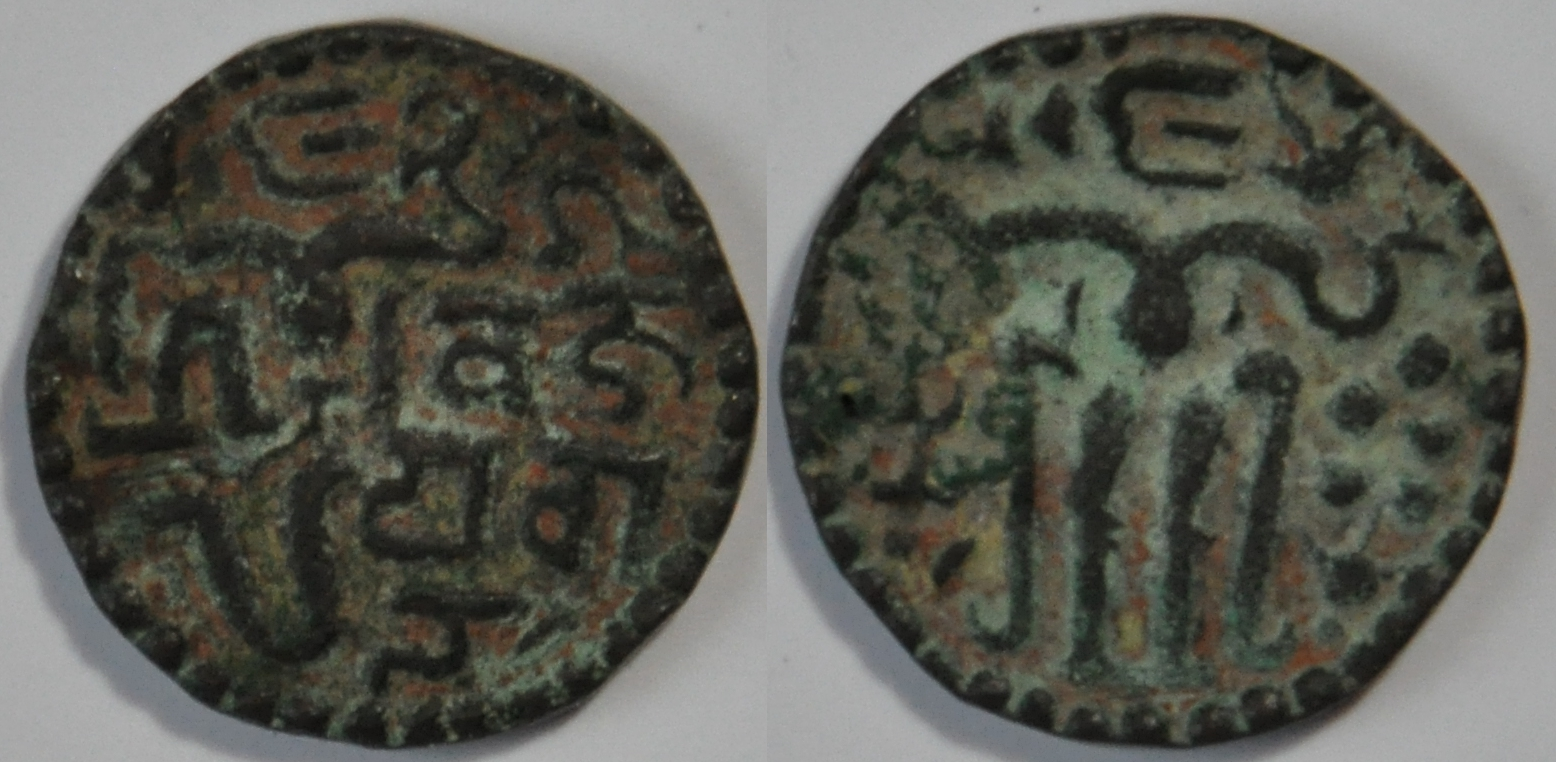
- One massa with Vijaya Bahu IV
- Reign: 1267/8-1270
- Predecessor: Parakkamabahu II
- Successor: Bhuvanaikabahu I
- Died: October 1270
- Issue: Parakkamabahu III
- House: House of Siri Sanga Bo
- Father: Parakkamabahu II
- Religion: Theravada Buddhism

Vijayabahu IV (died October 1270) was King of Dambadeniya in the 13th century, who ruled from 1267/8 to 1270. He succeeded his father Parakkamabahu II as King of Dambadeniya and was succeeded by his brother Bhuvanaikabahu I after being murdered consequent to a conspiracy.

== See also ==
- List of Sri Lankan monarchs
- History of Sri Lanka

Vijayabahu IV House of Siri Sanga Bo Born: ? ? Died: ? ?
Regnal titles
Preceded by Parakkamabahu II	King of Dambadeniya; 1267/8–1270	Succeeded by Bhuvanaikabahu I
