= Bhuvanekabahu I =

Bhuvanaikabahu I
- King of Dambadeniya
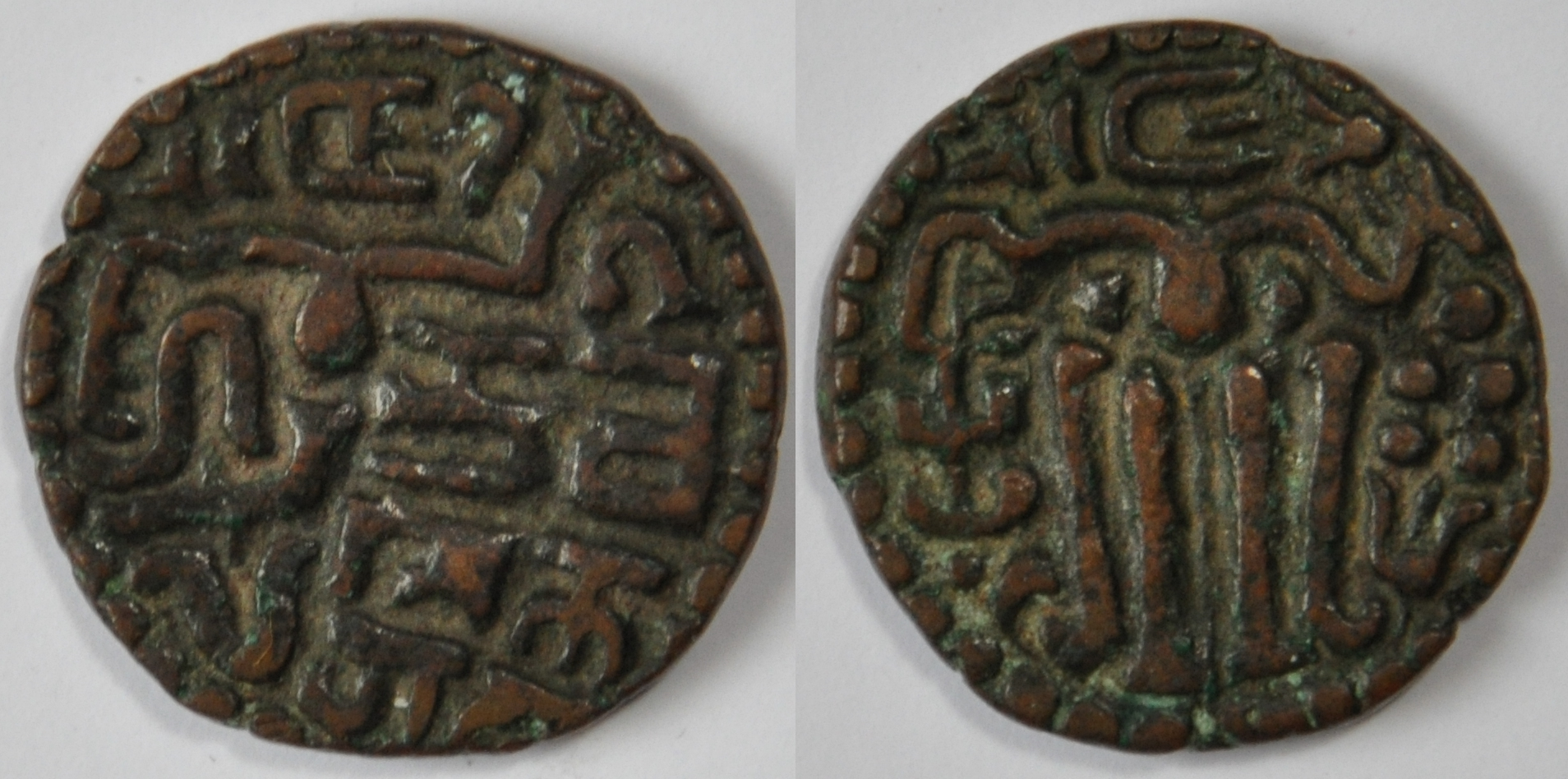
- Massa coin of Bhuvanaikabahu I
- Reign: 1271-1285
- Predecessor: Vijayabahu IV
- Successor: Interregnum; Parakkamabahu III
- House: House of Siri Sanga Bo
- Father: Parakkamabahu II
- Religion: Theravada Buddhism

Bhuvanaikabahu I was King of Dambadeniya in the 13th century, who ruled from 1271 to 1283. He succeeded his brother Vijayabahu IV as King of Dambadeniya and an Interregnum of 19 years is thought to have occurred after his death. His nephew Parakkamabahu III ruled from Polonnaruwa, and was not formally considered as a King of Dambadeniya.

Bhuvanaikabahu I is known to have resided in Yapahuwa.

== Relations with Egypt ==
Historical chronicles record that king Bhuvanaikabahu sent an embassy to the Mamluk Sultanate in early 1283 with the aim of forming an alliance.

== See also ==
- List of Sri Lankan monarchs
- History of Sri Lanka

Bhuvanekabahu I House of Siri Sanga Bo Born: ? ? Died: ? ?
Regnal titles
Preceded by Vijayabahu IV	King of Dambadeniya; 1271–1283	Succeeded by Interregnum; Parakkamabahu III
