= Parakramabahu IV =

Parakkamabahu IV
- King of Dambadeniya
- Reign: 1325/6
- Predecessor: Bhuvanaikabahu II
- Successor: Bhuvanaikabahu III
Names
- Pandit Parakramabahu
- Dynasty: House of Siri Sanga Bo
- Father: Bhuvanaikabahu II
- Mother: Queen Saraswathi Devi of Kalinga
- Religion: Theravada Buddhism

Parakkamabahu IV was King of Dambadeniya in the 14th century, who was also a scholar known as Pandit Parakramabahu. He built a temple for the Tooth Relic at Kurunegala and was responsible for writing Dhaladha Siritha, a book that laid down procedures for uninterrupted conduct of paying homage to the sacred relic. He renamed Mahanuwara (Kandy/මහනුවර) as Senkadagala. He extended patronage to Vijayaba Pirivena, Asgiriya Temple, and Sri Ghanananda Pirivena. He succeeded his father Bhuvanaikabahu II as King of Dambadeniya and was succeeded by Bhuvanaikabahu III.

== See also ==
- List of Sri Lankan monarchs
- History of Sri Lanka

Parakramabahu IV House of Siri Sanga Bo Born: ? ? Died: ? ?
Regnal titles
Preceded by Bhuvanaikabahu II	King of Dambadeniya; 1325/6	Succeeded by Bhuvanaikabahu III
