= Parakramabahu III =

Parakkamabahu III තුන්වන පරාක්‍රමබාහු

King of Dambadeniya
- Reign: 1302-1310
- Predecessor: Interregnum; Bhuvanaikabahu I
- Successor: Bhuvanaikabahu II
- House: House of Siri Sanga Bo
- Father: Vijayabahu IV
- Religion: Theravada Buddhism

Parakramabahu III (Sinhala: තුන්වන පරාක්‍රමබාහු), was a medieval king of Dambadeniya, from 1302 to 1310. He succeeded his uncle Bhuvanekabahu I as King of Dambadeniya and was succeeded by Bhuvanaikabahu II.

He is thought to be the last monarch to establish himself at Polonnaruwa, which was chosen as the capital of Sri Lanka by Sinhalese kings over a period of for 430 years from time to time.

== Life and Reign ==
Chronicles stated that he is a son of King Vijayabahu who was assassinated in 1270 and after the death of King Buvanekabhahu I he was crowned immediately. But Mahavamsa says that after the death of Bhuvanekabahu I Sri Lanka faced a huge feminine invasion from the Pandyan kingdom.

=== Pandyan Invasion ===
That invasion happened under the command of King Maravarman Kulasekara Pandyan I (A.D.1268-A.D.1308) and was done by a minister under him called Arya Cakravarthi. It was stated in Pandyan scripture in 1305 and it tells that he invaded Yapahuwa and took the Tooth Relic of The Buddha to Pandya country.

So there can be said that king Parakramabhahu faced heavy problems at the moment on the sitting throne. So there could conclude that after solving the majority of problems he had taken the throne officially after a coronation. This can show by a Tamil poem called Sarajoti Malai which was recited at King Parakramabhahu III in May, 1310 which was the seventh year after his coronation. Then it can be said his reign was started in 1302 or 1303. In the meantime can be taken as a turbulent period in Sri Lanka. It can also be said that a large part of Sri Lanka has become part of the Pandyan Empire.

In this period, for the protection of Tooth and Bowl Relic, China which was under the rule of the Yuan dynasty had sent an envoy to the Pandyan court in 1284. Also, a famous traveller Marco Polo came to Sri Lanka between 1292 and 1294. His records stated that a king named Sendamain whose identity was unknown.

== Return of the Tooth Relic ==
Anyway, king Parakramabhahu III was succeeded in taking back Tooth Relic to the country and taking his capital as Polonnaruwa to rule the country. For taking back the Tooth relic he had to humble himself by representing himself at the Pandyan court as an envoy. It can also take as he becomes vassal of Pandyan empire.

However, it was unfortunate that his reign range was unknown in history. There was said his cousin Buvanekabhahu who was the son of Buvanekabhahu usurped the throne by sending his barber to the blind king. After that taking the throne king Buvanekabhahu change capital to Kurunagala.

== See also ==
- List of Sri Lankan monarchs
- History of Sri Lanka

Parakramabahu III House of Siri Sanga Bo Born: ? ? Died: ? ?
Regnal titles
Preceded by Interregnum; Bhuvanaikabahu I	King of Dambadeniya; 1302–1310	Succeeded by Bhuvanaikabahu II
