= Vijayabahu III =

- King of Dambadeniya
- Reign: 1232- 1236
- Predecessor: Kingdom established
- Successor: Parakkamabahu II
- Issue: Parakkamabahu II
- House: House of Siri Sanga Bo
- Religion: Theravada Buddhism

Vijayabahu III was the first King of Dambadeniya, who ruled from 1232- 1236. He was a member of the Sinhala Royal Family who began the Siri Sanga Bo dynasty, he was succeeded by his son Parakkamabahu II. Before he became the king of Dambadeniya, he was a ruler of a small province – a Vanni chieftain. Vijayabahu III brought the relic of the tooth of the Buddha to Dambadeniya – after it was hidden in Kotmale with the invasion of Kalinga Magha – and was placed in the Beligala Temple of Tooth. At that time, people of Dambadeniya considered the possession of the aforementioned relic, a clear indication that Vijayabahu III was the rightful King of Dambadeniya.

== In popular culture ==
In the 2013 film Siri Parakum directed by Somaratne Dissanayake, Palitha Silva played the role of Vijayabahu III.

== See also ==
- List of Sri Lankan monarchs
- History of Sri Lanka

Vijayabahu III House of Siri Sanga Bo Born: ? ? Died: ? ?
Regnal titles
Preceded by Kalinga Magha as King of Polonnaruwa	King of Dambadeniya –	Succeeded by Parakkamabahu II
