= Kalinga Magha =

King of Polonnaruwa (1215–1236) and Jaffna (1215–1255)

- Gangaraja Kalinga Vijayabahu

King of Polonnaruwa
- Reign: 1215–1236
- Predecessor: Parakrama Pandyan II
- Successor: Parakramabahu II (as King of Dambadeniya)

King of Jaffna
- Reign: 1215–1255
- Successor: Chandrabhanu
- Born: Kalinga
- House: Chodaganga

Kalinga Magha or Gangaraja Kalinga Vijayabahu (Tamil: கலிங்க மாகன் / கலிங்க மாகோன் / கங்கராஜ காலிங்க விஜயவாகு மகன், Odia: କଳିଙ୍ଗ ମଘା / ଗଙ୍ଗାରାଜ କଳିଙ୍ଗ ବିଜୟବାହୁ, Sinhala: කාලිංග මාඝ) was an invader from the Kingdom of Kalinga who usurped the throne from Parakrama Pandyan II of Polonnaruwa in 1215. A massive migration followed of Sinhalese people to the south and west of Sri Lanka, and into the mountainous interior, as they attempted to escape his power. Magha was the last ruler to have his seat in the traditional northern seat of native power on the island, known as Rajarata; so comprehensive was his destruction of Sinhalese power in the north that all of the successor kingdoms to Rajarata existed primarily in the south of the island.

Several theories exist about Magha, these theories range from defining him as an eastern Ganga king to a member of the Sinhalese Kalinga dynasty established by Kalinga Lokeshvara. Some historians identify him as the Kulankayan Cinkai Ariyan mentioned in the Jaffna Tamil chronicles, stating that Kulanka is actually a corruption of Kalinga. A Tamil inscription found in Gomarankadawala, Trincomalee District proves that Kalinga Magha was consecrated as King of Polonnaruwa under the name of Gangaraja Kalinga Vijayabahu by Kulothunga Chola III.

== Origin theories ==
The exacts origin of Kalinga Magha is unknown, however due to his name, he is often referred to be from Kalinga, a historical place which corresponds mainly with present-day Odisha and northeastern Andhra. The most favoured theory states that Magha was a prince from the Eastern Ganga dynasty (Chodaganga) who ruled Kalinga. They were descended from the Kalinga Chandravanshi lineage and also from the Tamil Chola dynasty from the maternal side. Magha also seems to be related to the Kalinga branch of the Sinhalese Kingdom, and Nissanka Malla Deva of Polonnaruwa.

A late theory identifies Magha as the founder of the Jaffna kingdom and the first king of the Aryacakravarti dynasty. Many later Tamil works of Jaffna, mistake Kalinga Magha with the Aryacakravarti kings of Jaffna, who actually belong to the Aryacakravarti lineage of the Pandya Kingdom. The Cūḷavaṃsa, a Pali account, makes a clear distinction between Kalinga Magha, whom it describes as "the plague from the Kalinga that came with an army of Kerala mercenaries" and Arya Chakrawartin whom it describes as a Pandyan general.

== Invasion and Reign ==
The invasion of Kalinga Magha happened in a period of intense rivalry between two branches of the Sinhala royal family for the succession to the throne of Rajarata: the Arya branch which descended from Mithra (sister of king Vijayabahu I) who married a Pandyan prince and the Kalinga branch, descended from Vijayabahu I.

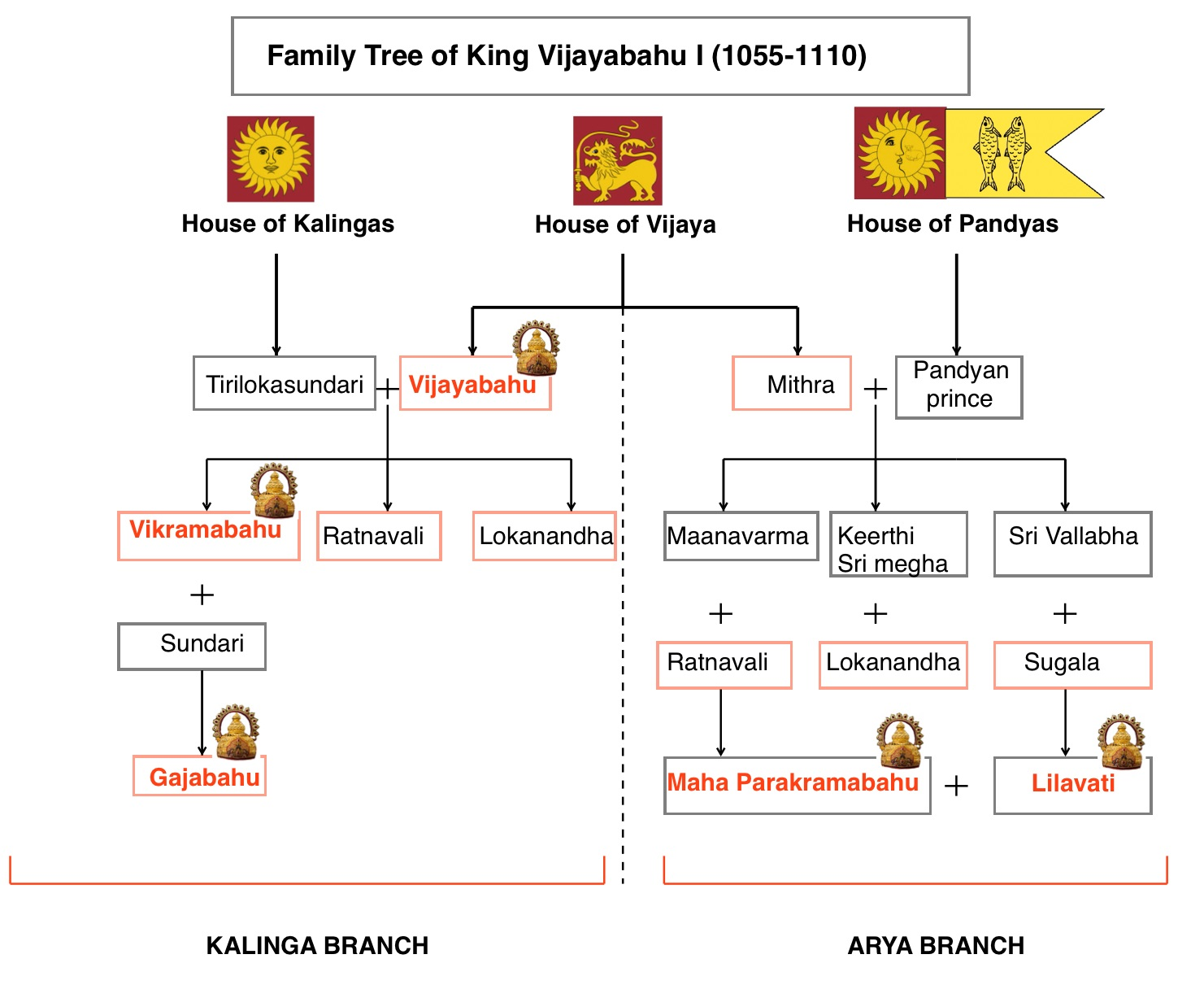
The family tree of Vijayabahu I, the origin of Kalinga branch and Arya branch of Sinhala royal family

After the death of Parakramabahu I, who belonged to the Arya (or Pandya) branch, the country fall into the hands of foreign invaders both from Kalinga and Pandya dynasty. It is in this context of intense rivalry between Kalinga and Pandya dynasties, that Kalinga Magha, the "plague from Kalinga", (which was by then allied with the Chola dynasty) arrived in Lanka.

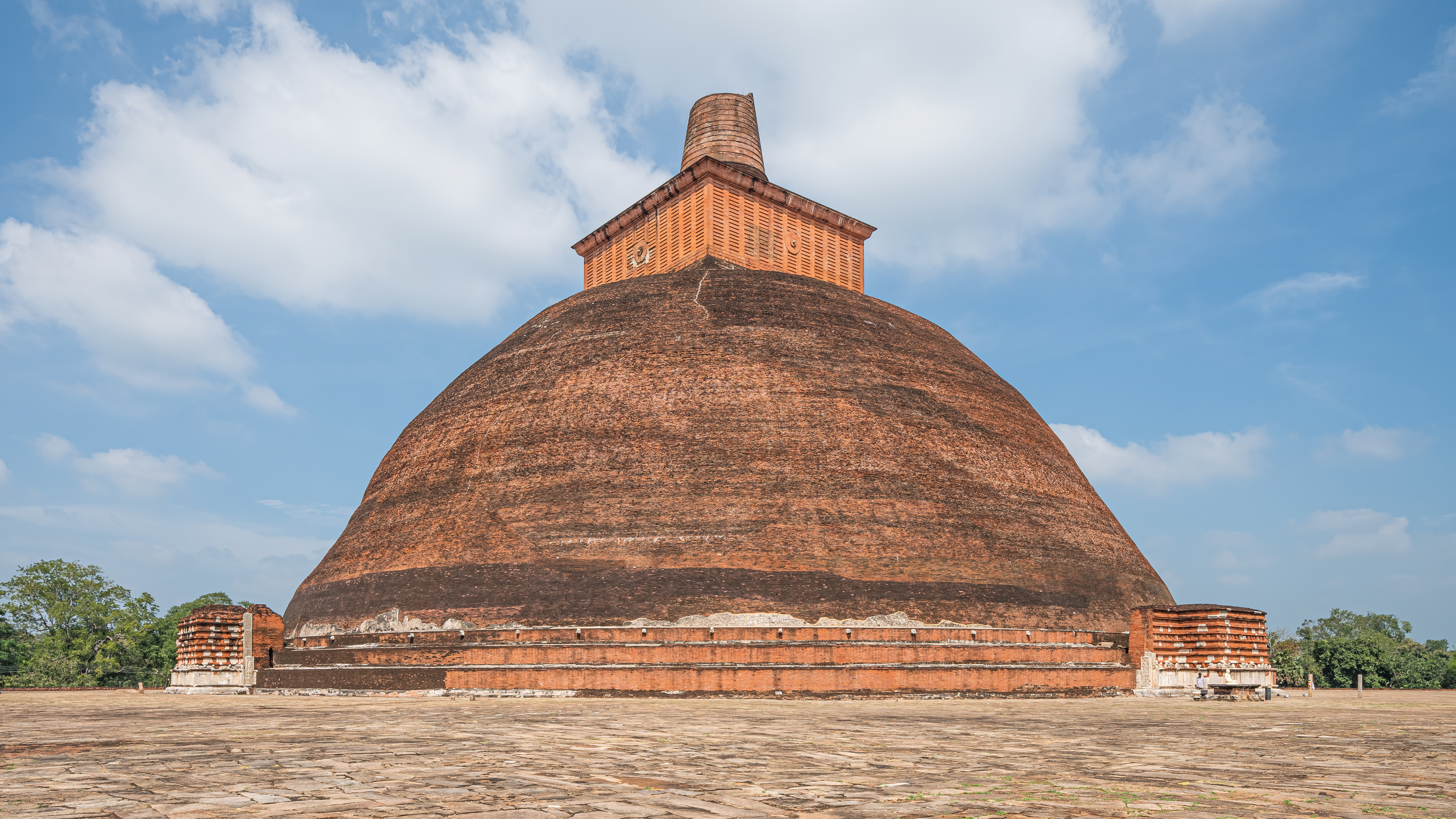
Jetavanaramaya, one of the many massive stupas raided during Magha's reign.

Kalinga Magha landed in Karainagar in 1215 AD with a large army of 24,000 Kerala and Tamil soldiers. He camped his soldiers in Karainagar and Vallipuram and brought the Jaffna principality under his control. Kalinga Magha then marched to Polonnaruwa, defeated Parakrama Pandyan II and ruled it for 21 years. He was expelled from Polonnaruwa in 1236 by a faction of Arya (Pandya) dynasty Sinhalese kings and withdrew to Jaffna with the Sinhalese throne which he ruled till 1255.

== Mention of Kalinga Magha in Culavamsa ==
The Culavamsa, describes him as 'an unjust king sprung from the Kalinga line'.

It has been speculated that Magha may have had a claim through the Kalingan dynasty established by Nissanka Malla in 1187, who was the uncle of Chodaganga of Polonnaruwa. Whatever his pretext however he swiftly lost any potential support amongst the populace by the sheer violence of his invasion.

Having executed Parakrama Pandya and ransacked the temples of Anuradhapura and Polonnaruwa, Magha was crowned king by his own soldiers from Kerala and settled in the capital of Polonnaruwa. The army have been described in the Culavamsa to be ruthless, and to have thoroughly destroyed the Buddhist religion, ransacking and destroying many Stupas.

== The Rise of Dambadeniya ==
It was during this time that the centre of native power on Sri Lanka began to shift to the south. During Magha's reign the chief priests of Pulatthinagara took two of Rajarata's most sacred relics - the Buddha's alms bowl and the sacred Tooth Relic - and 'on Kothmalé in a safe region ... buried both the relics carefully in the earth and so preserved them'. This was not the first time this had happened; it was, however, to be the last, as neither was ever returned to the north.

Resistance to the invaders began to coalesce around a series of inaccessible towns and fortresses constructed in the mountainous interior of Sri Lanka. The fortress of Yapahuwa was one of the first of these, founded by the Senapathi (General) Subha; another was Gangadoni, founded by the general Sankha, barely 15 miles ('two yojanas') from Magha's capital. From these places the various nobles 'gave as little heed to the infamous army of the Ruler Magha, though ... as to a blade of grass and protected without fear that district and the Order [of Buddhist monks]'.

The man who eventually emerged as the leader of the resistance was Vijayabahu III, who the chronicles identify as a descendant of Sirisamghabodhi (242-244 or 251–253), a king of Rajarata, though it is possible that the relationship was through marriage. He appears to have spent an extended period of time in 'inaccessible forest' avoiding the forces of Magha. Sometime in the 1220s however he drove the Tamil forces from Mayarata (Dhakkinadesa) and established his capital at Jambudhoni (Dambadeniya). Vijayabahu's most emphatic statement of authority however was the recovery of the two sacred relics (around 1222), which he paraded through the lands he controlled and invested in a freshly constructed temple.

Vijayabahu's reign was largely spent reconstructing the shattered Buddhist infrastructure of the Sinhalese in Mayarata, and indeed many of the religious traditions he established were to last into modern times. Occasionally raids into Kalinga-controlled territory were mounted, but it was not until the reign of is son, Parakramabahu II(1234–1267) that a concerted effort was made to drive the invaders out from Polonnaruwa Kingdom.

Soon after his accession the Culavamsa describes how the King 'set about subjugating by the power of his majesty and by the might of his loving spirit ... the forces of the foe in Lanka'. It would appear however that Magha had retreated to the Jaffna Kingdom and ruled until the throne was secured by Chandrabhanu, but the chronicles make no mention of him taking part in the wars between Parakramabahu and the Kalinga. Instead it names two Damila kings, Mahinda and Jayabahu, as having established fortifications in Polonnaruwa; both in due course, defeated the resurgent forces of Dambadeniya. Magha does not re-appear in the historical record; his fate remains a mystery.

== See also ==
- List of Sri Lankan monarchs
- History of Sri Lanka

Preceded by Parakrama Pandyan II	Polonaruwa Kingdom; 1215–1236	Succeeded by Parakramabahu II (Kingdom of Dambadeniya)
Preceded by new state formed	Jaffna Kingdom; 1215–1255	Succeeded by Chandrabhanu
