= Dambadeniya =

- Location within Sri Lanka
- Coordinates: 7°22′2″N 80°08′48″E
- Country: Sri Lanka
- Province: North Western Province
- Time zone: UTC+5:30 (Sri Lanka Standard Time Zone)
  - Summer (DST): UTC+6 (Summer time)

Dambadeniya (DMBD) is a ruined ancient city situated in the North Western Province (Wayamba), Sri Lanka on the Kurunegala–Negombo main road. It served as the capital of Sri Lanka in the mid 13th century. Much of Dambadeniya still lies buried on a huge fortified rock. Dambadeniya is situated about 31 km from Kurunegala, the modern day capital of the North Western Province. Dambadeniya is situated about 4 km from Giriulla.

== History ==
Dambadeniya, about 30 km south-west of Kurunegala, became prominent in the mid-13th century. It was selected as the capital of the kingdom of Sri Lanka by King Vijayabahu III (1232–36). The sovereignty of the country was at stake as a result of invasions, which dislodged Polonnaruwa as the capital. Vijayabahu, the king of the Dambadeniya dynasty, fought the invaders and established Dambadeniya. On the summit of the Dambadeniya rock he built fortifications and sturdy walls and gates. The city was made secure by a moat, a marsh and ramparts around the royal palace. During the reign of King Parakramabahu II (1236–70), Dambadeniya reached the zenith of its glory. King Parakramabahu II's immaculate Poetic masterpieces "Kavisilumina" and "Visuddi Marga Sannasa" gave a turning point to Sinhalese literature. Dambadeniya era was the reason why Sinhalese literature is not limited to paintings nor scripts.

== Environment ==
Among the ruins of the remaining palace grounds, the foundations are still visible. Excavations have uncovered remains of the temple of the Relic of the tooth of the Buddha, the Royal Palace, gardens, moats, and city walls. The double-story temple of the Tooth Relic has Buddha images, identified as the Vijayasundararamaya. It also has some interesting wall paintings dating from the 18th century.

== See also ==
- Kingdom of Dambadeniya

== Bibliography ==
- Amaradasa Liyanagamage, The decline of Polonnaruwa and the rise of Dambadeniya, Department of Cultural Affairs, Government Press, Colombo, Sri Lanka. 1968.
