= Kingdom of Dambadeniya =

Sinhalese kingdom in present-day Sri Lanka (1220–1345)

Kingdom of Dambadeniya දඹදෙණිය රාජධානිය
- 1220–1345
- Status: Kingdom
- Capital: Dambadeniya (1226–1271); Yapahuwa (1271–1283); Polonnaruwa (1302–1310); Kurunagala (1310-1345/6)
- Common languages: Sinhala
- Religion: Theravada Buddhism
- Government: Monarchy
- King
  - 1220–1224: Vijayabahu III
  - 1234–1269: Parakramabahu II
  - 1269–1271: Vijayabahu IV
  - 1271–1283: Bhuvanaikabahu I
  - 1283–1302: Interregnum
  - 1302–1310: Parakramabahu III
  - 1310–1325/6: Bhuvanaikabahu II
  - 1325/6: Parakramabahu IV
  - 1325/6: Bhuvanaikabahu III
  - 1325/6–1344/5: Vijayabahu V
- Historical era: Transitional period
  - Fall of Polonnaruwa: 1220
  - Capital moved to Gampola: 1345
- Currency: Massa (coin)
Preceded by	Succeeded by
Kingdom of Polonnaruwa	Kingdom of Gampola

The Kingdom of Dambadeniya was a medieval Sinhalese kingdom in what is present-day Sri Lanka. The kingdom's rulers reigned from 1220–1345.

== History ==
=== Founding ===
The first king to choose Dambadeniya as his capital was Vijayabahu III. He was able to bring about the unity among the Sangha that had fled in various directions due to the hostile activities of the invader Kalinga Magha and succeeded in holding a Buddhist convention in 1226 to bring about peace among the Buddhist clergy.

Parakramabahu II succeeded his father, King Vijayabahu III. He was regarded as a gifted ruler, celebrated both as a poet and a prolific writer. Among his notable works is Kausilumina, which is considered a masterpiece of Sinhala literature.

His eldest son, Bosath Vijayabahu, was crowned in 1270. He was well known for his modest character and religious devotion. However, his reign was short-lived; he was assassinated in the second year of his rule by a minister named Miththa.

After the death of his elder brother Vijayabahu IV, Bhuvanekabahu I, the next in line to the throne, moved the capital to Yapahuwa for reasons of security. He continued in his father’s tradition as a writer and carried forward the religious activities initiated by his brother.

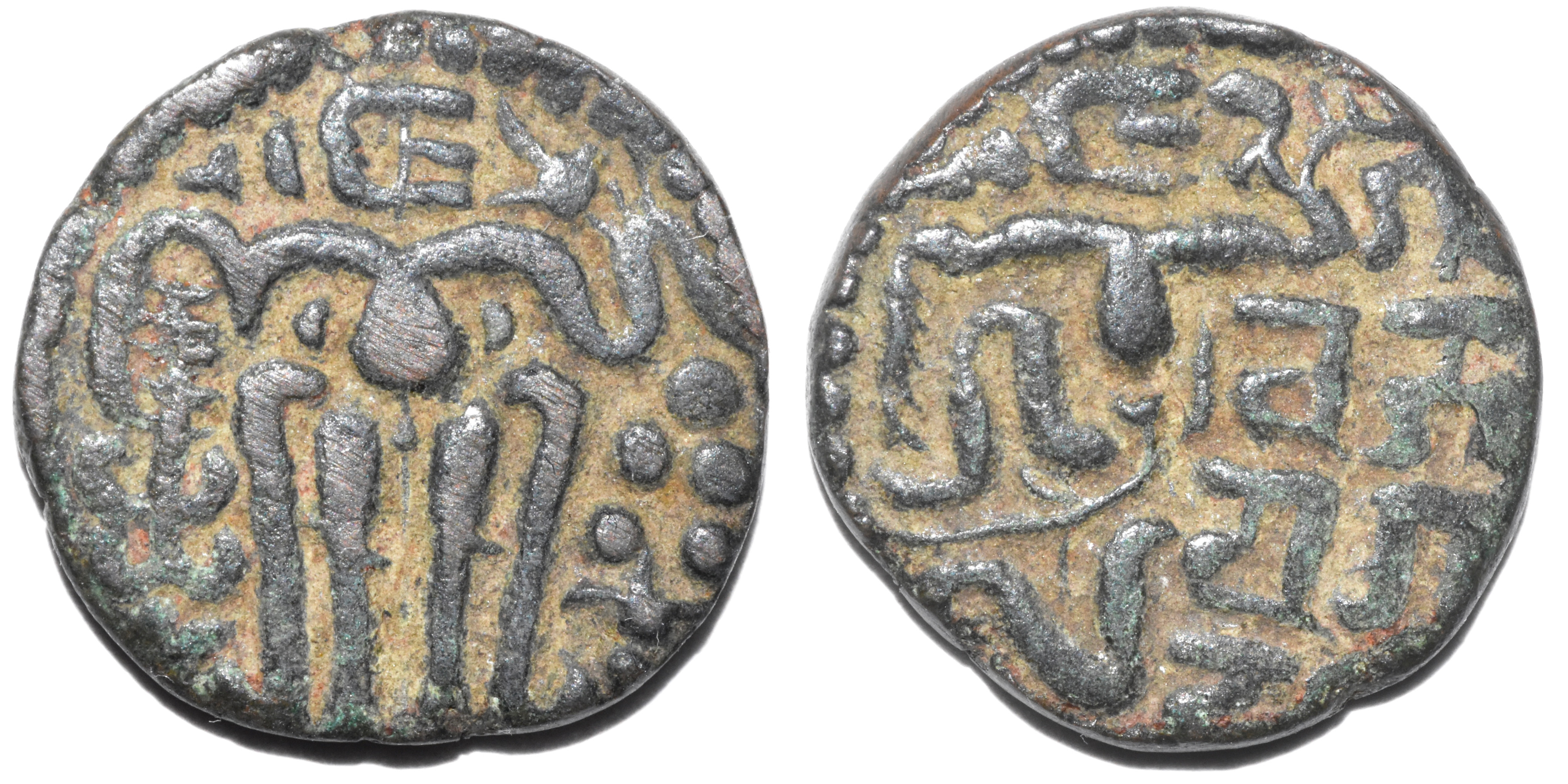
A copper massa coin of Vijayabahu IV.

=== Rule from Yapahuwa ===
After the assassination of Vijayabahu IV, his brother ascended the throne following a series of conflicts with dissident generals and became Bhuvanekabahu I (1272–1284). Considering Dambadeniya insecure, he transferred the capital to Yapahuwa in 1273 and developed it into a fortified royal residence.

Yapahuwa, built on a 90-meter-high rock boulder in the style of Sigiriya, served as both a palace and a military stronghold against foreign invasions. Many defensive structures remain, but the site’s most striking feature is its ornamental stairway. At the summit are the ruins of a stupa, a Bodhi tree enclosure, and rock shelters once used by Buddhist monks, indicating that the site functioned as a monastery before becoming a fortress. At the base of the rock are several caves, including one with Buddha images and another bearing a Brahmi inscription. Fortifications with two moats and ramparts still stand, along with the remains of shrines and other buildings. The Yapahuwa Rajamaha Vihara, built during the Kandyan period, continues the site’s Buddhist legacy.

The Sacred Tooth Relic was brought from Dambadeniya and enshrined in a temple at the summit of the stairway. However, in 1284, following the death of Bhuvanekabahu I, the Pandyas of South India invaded, captured the Tooth Relic, and carried it to India. It was recovered in 1288 by Parakramabahu III (1287–1293), who temporarily safeguarded it in Polonnaruwa.

After the invasion, Yapahuwa was abandoned as a royal capital and was later inhabited by Buddhist monks and religious ascetics.

=== Rule from Polonnaruwa ===
Parakramabahu III, the son of Vijayabahu III and the grandson of Parakramabahu II became king in Polonnaruwa. became king at Polonnaruwa. During his reign, he sought to restore the Sacred Tooth Relic to the island by establishing diplomatic relations with the Pandyan Kingdom. His efforts were successful, and the relic was enshrined in the Temple of the Tooth at Polonnaruwa. He ruled for five years before his death in 1303.

=== Rule from Kurunegala ===
Bhuvanekabahu II, the son of Bhuvanekabahu I, succeeded his cousin Parakramabahu III in 1303 and shifted the capital to Kurunegala, ruling for two years until his death in 1305. Kurunegala served as the capital of Sri Lanka from around 1300 to 1341, following the kingdom of Yapahuwa. During this period, five kings of the Sinhala dynasty reigned from the city.

The first ruler was Bhuvanekabahu II (1303–1305), followed by his son Parakramabahu IV (1302–1326). Parakramabahu IV is noted for translating the Buddhist Jataka tales into Sinhala and commissioning temples, including the Alutnuwara Devale in Kegalle. He also oversaw a strong religious revival, reorganizing rituals associated with the Sacred Tooth Relic as recorded in the Dalada Sirita. Little is known about his successors, Bhuvanekabahu III, Vijayabahu V, and Bhuvanekabahu IV, or the reasons the capital was moved again, though Parakramabahu V later ruled from Gampola (1344–1408).

Kurunegala was historically known as Hasthishailya-pura and in literature as Athugalpura (“City of the Elephant Rock”), named for the prominent elephant-shaped rock that dominates the landscape. Several other large rocks in the area, such as Monkey Rock and Tortoise Rock, are also notable landmarks. Today, an 88-foot Buddha statue sits atop the Elephant Rock.

During this period, the Sacred Tooth Relic was kept and venerated in Kurunegala. Archaeological remains of its temple, including stone steps and part of a doorway, can still be seen.

Kurunegala is surrounded by other historical sites, including the earlier capitals of Panduwasnuwara, Dambadeniya, and Yapahuwa, reflecting the region’s significance in medieval Sri Lankan history.

=== Rule of king Parakramabahu IV ===
Parakramabahu IV, regarded as the greatest king of the Kurunegala period, was also known as Panditha Parakramabahu II in recognition of his contributions to Buddhism, education, and literature. His authority extended beyond Kurunegala to regions including Kandy, Kegalle, Colombo, Ratnapura, Kalutara, Galle, and much of the southern province. He authored the book Dalada Siriththa and is credited with constructing the Asgiriya Viharaya in Kandy.

== Culture ==
=== Education ===
Parakramabahu IV, the son of Bhuvanekabahu II, was a wise and learned ruler, earning the title Panditha Parakramabahu. He authored Dalada Siritha and was responsible for renaming Mahanuwara as Senkadagala. He also translated important Pali texts into Sinhala, including Sinhala Bodhiwansaya and Sanda Kinduru Daa Kava, contributing significantly to Buddhist education and literature.

=== Literature ===
The Dambadeniya period is regarded as a golden era of Sinhala literature. Many significant literary works were produced in Sinhala, Pali, and Sanskrit during this time, including Sinhala Thupavamsa, Dalada Siritha, and Sarajothi Malai. Notable poetic works include Kausilumina, Muwadewdawatha, Sidath Sangarawa, Buthsarana, and Saddharma Rathnawaliya.

Stone inscriptions from this period include Kevulgama pillar inscription, Narambadde Ududumbara inscription, Rambukkana Dewala inscription, Aluthnuwara Dewala inscription, and Galapatha Viharaya inscription. King Parakramabahu II contributed to literature himself, writing Visuddi Marga Sannasa and Kavisilumina.

== See also ==
- Sri Lanka
- History of Sri Lanka
- List of Sri Lankan monarchs
