= Yapahuwa =

Yapahuwa යාපහුව
- Location within Sri Lanka
- Coordinates: 7.816784°N 80.310746°E
- Country: Sri Lanka
- Province: North Western Province
- Time zone: UTC+5:30 (Sri Lanka Standard Time Zone)
  - Summer (DST): UTC+6 (Summer time)

Yapahuwa (Sinhalese language : යාපහුව) was one of the ephemeral capitals of medieval Sri Lanka. The citadel of Yapahuwa lying midway between Kurunagala and Anuradhapura was built around a huge granite rock rising abruptly almost a hundred meters above the surrounding lowlands.

In 1272, King Bhuvenakabahu transferred the capital from Dambadeniya to Yapahuwa in the face of Dravidian invasions from South India, bringing the Sacred Tooth Relic with him. Following the death of King Bhuvenakabahu in 1284, the Pandyans of South India invaded Sri Lanka once again, and succeeded in capturing Sacred Tooth Relic. Following its capture, Yapahuwa was largely abandoned and inhabited by Buddhist monks and religious ascetics.

== Location and Name ==
The rock fortress complex of Yapahuwa is situated in the North Western Province, Sri Lanka. It is located approximately between southeast of Mahawa midway Kurunegala and Anuradhapura. The original name of this Buddhist Heritage was Yapawwa but now it is called as Yapahuwa, which is a kind of distortion of its genuine etymological sense.

== History ==
Yapahuwa served as the capital of Sri Lanka in the latter part of the 13th century (1273–1284). Built on a huge, 90 m (300 ft) high rock boulder in the style of the Sigiriya rock fortress, Yapahuwa was a palace and military stronghold against foreign invaders, specifically the Pandyan Southern Indians.

The palace and fortress were built by King Buvanekabahu I (1272–1284) in the year 1273. Many traces of ancient battle defences can still be seen, while an ornamental stairway, is its biggest showpiece. This staircase is a long one with around 100 steps, and it is situated at an abrupt 70-degree angle, a strategic design chosen by the king to give an advantage to the king's army on the high-ground in case of inevitable attacks. On top of the rock are the remains of a stupa, a Bodhi tree enclosure, and a rock shelter/cave used by Buddhist monks, indicating that earlier this site was used as a Buddhist monastery, like many boulders and hills in the area. There are several caves at the base of the rock. In one of them there is a shrine with Buddha images. One cave has a Brahmi script inscription. At the southern base of the rock there is a fortification with two moats and ramparts. In this enclosure there are the remains of a number of buildings including a Buddhist shrine. There is also a Buddhist temple called Yapahuwa Rajamaha Vihara built during the Kandyan period.

The Tooth Relic was brought from Dambadeniya and kept in the Tooth Temple built for the purpose (also continuing the ancient tradition of ruling the land by possessing the Sacred Tooth) at the top of the third staircase. The relics were carried away from the temple here to South India by the Pandyas, and then recovered in 1288 by Parakkramabahu III (1287–1293), who temporarily placed them in safety at Polonnaruwa.

== Designs, Legends, and Architecture of Yapahuwa ==
Staircase: the staircases of Yapahuwa have three distinct sets of stairs; the lower staircase, about 15-20 steps, being in-front of a brick wall, the second staircase, being around a speculative 30-40 steps, is surrounded by large square constructs, and greenery, and the third starcase, the most recognized staircase, around 40-45 steps, it's stone portal/doorway "vahalkada" (Sinhalese language : වාහල්කඩ) and it's mythical beings in the architecture, called Makara Balustrades, such as dwarfs (gana) and lion-like creatures near the top. There is a legend, not mentioned often, that getting near the top of the staircase, looking where the lion-like creatures are staring, you could spot a proclaimed "treasure." While this is not confirmed, it is a local folktale about the Yapahuwa fortress.

Tooth Temple: the tooth temple, seen after getting to the top of all three staircases, is a ruined building, currently viewable as an outline and platform of sorts, which represented the foundation of the initial Tooth Temple, and it lasted only for a brief period of time, since after the king's death (1284) the fortress succumbed to a Pandyan (South Indian) invasion which successfully took the Buddha's Sacred Tooth to India, before it was taken back to Sri Lanka by negotiation, and threats in regards of military attacks, led by King Parakramabahu III, as mentioned before. It was believed to have been a simple design, but still a grand building which would represent the Sacred Tooth itself perfectly. As mentioned before, there is a legend that possessing the Sacred Tooth makes you the ruler of Sri Lanka, so it was common for kings in capital cities (like Anuradhapura, Polonnaruwa, later Kotte (In the 16-17th century), etc) making this a tradition that King Bhuvenakabahu I participated in.

The summit ruins: the summit represents and supports evidence of Yapahuwa temporarily being used as a monastery by Buddhist monks, and this is because the summit has a ruined small Buddhist stupa/chetiya (Sinhalese language : චේතිය) named Kota Wehera, a Bodhi tree shrine, and a small pond. Near the bottom has a bhikku/monk cave for pilgrimage. This is substantial evidence that supports the usage of Yapahuwa as a Buddhist monastery.

Murals: In some parts of Yapahuwa, there are murals and Buddhist statues which exist to honor the Buddha. Murals date back to the Kandyan kingdom and the location of these statues exist near the base of the Yapahuwa fortress. These murals reside in cave structures. For reference, check the image gallery.

== Image gallery ==
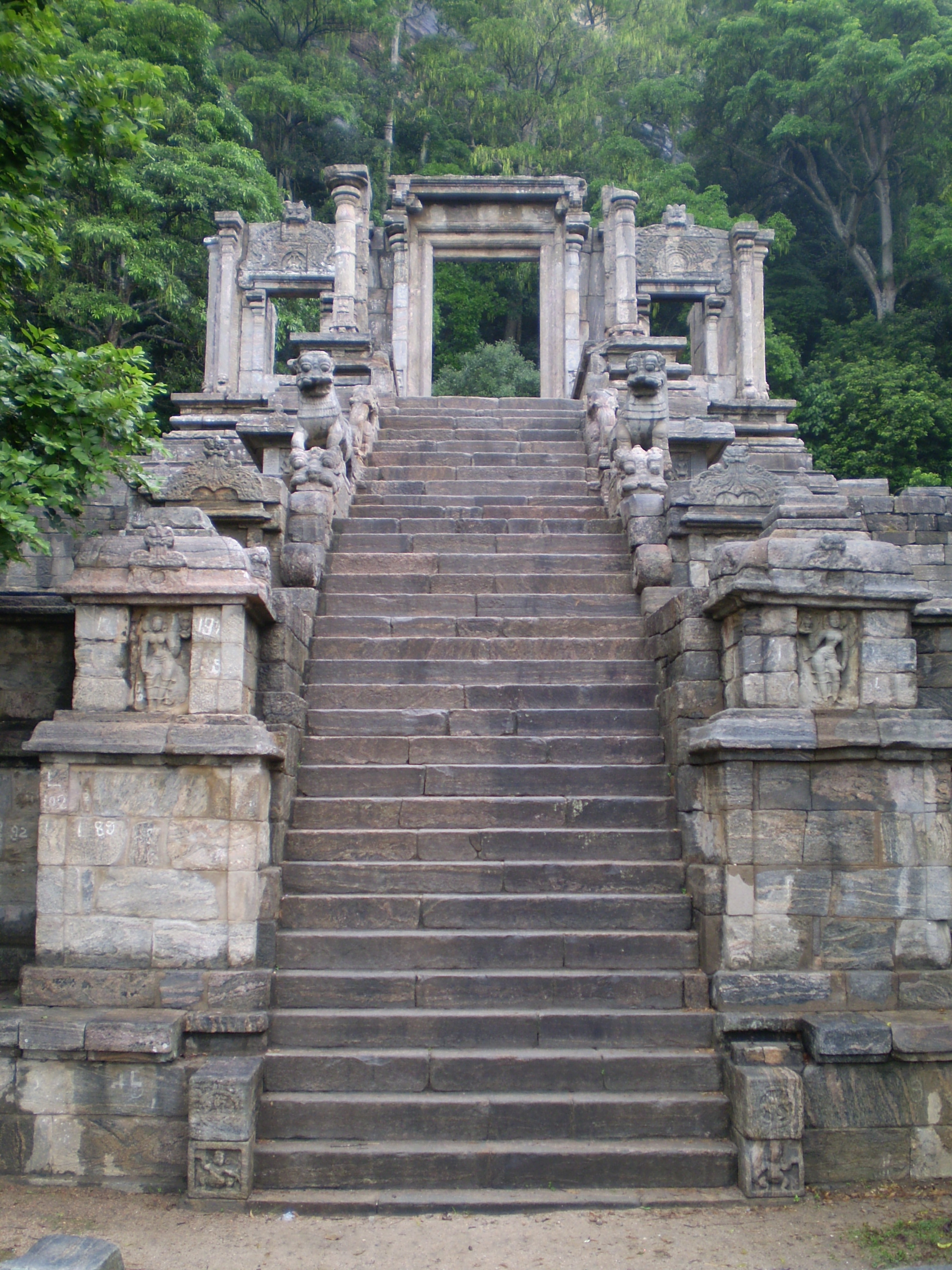
The Yapahuwa staircase.

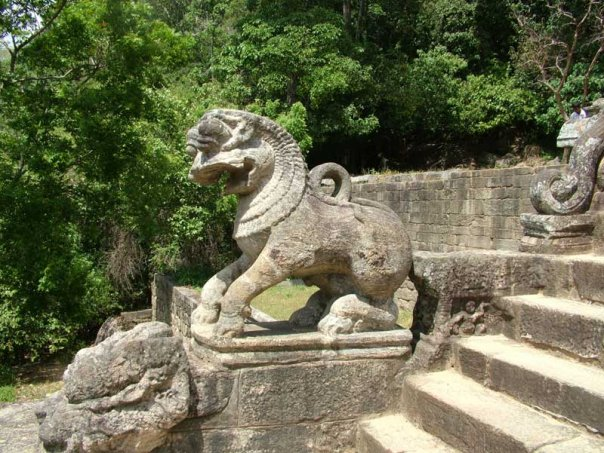
The Yapahuwa Lion stone sculpture (appears on the former 10-rupee note).

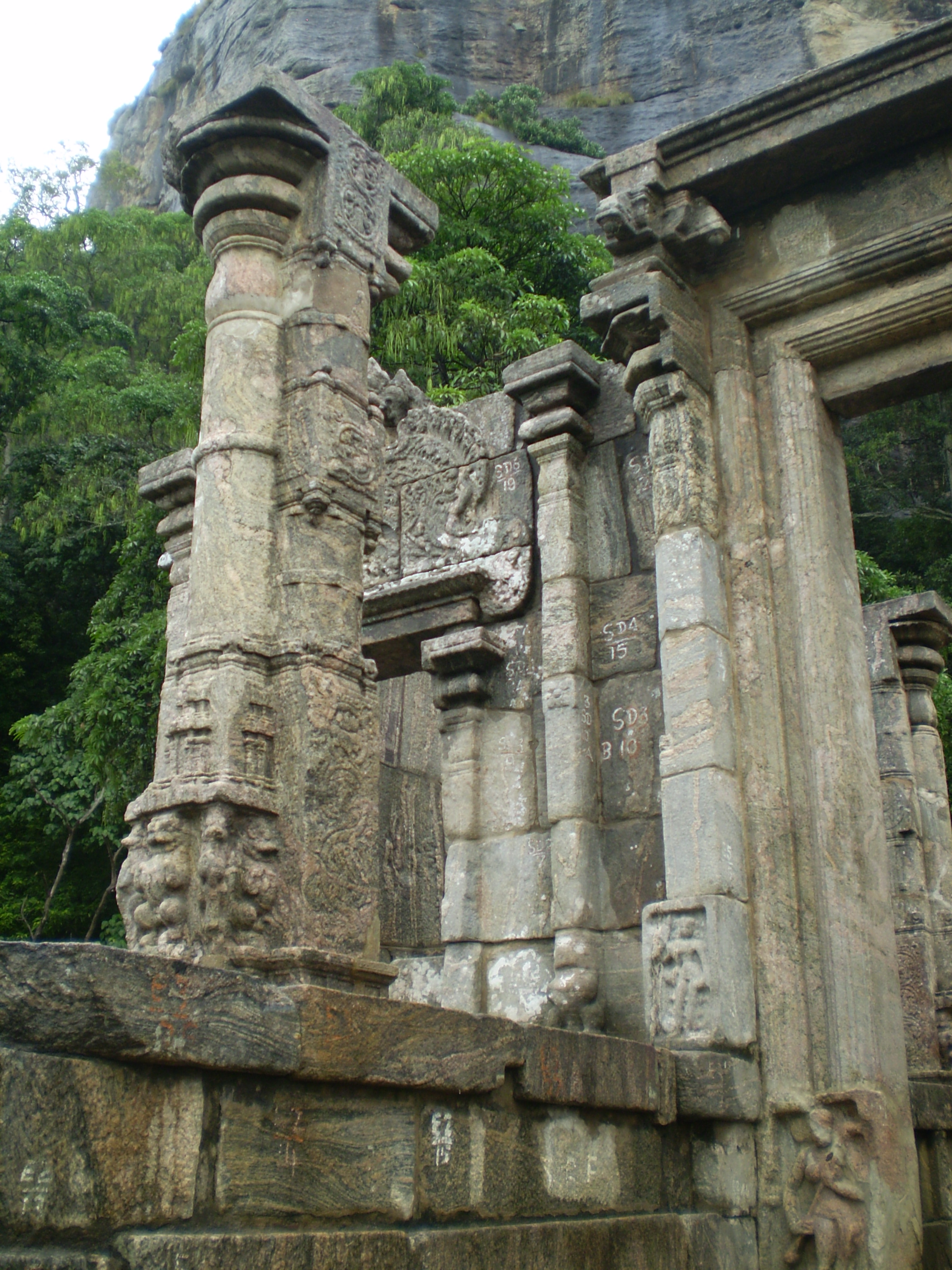
Carvings by the Staircase

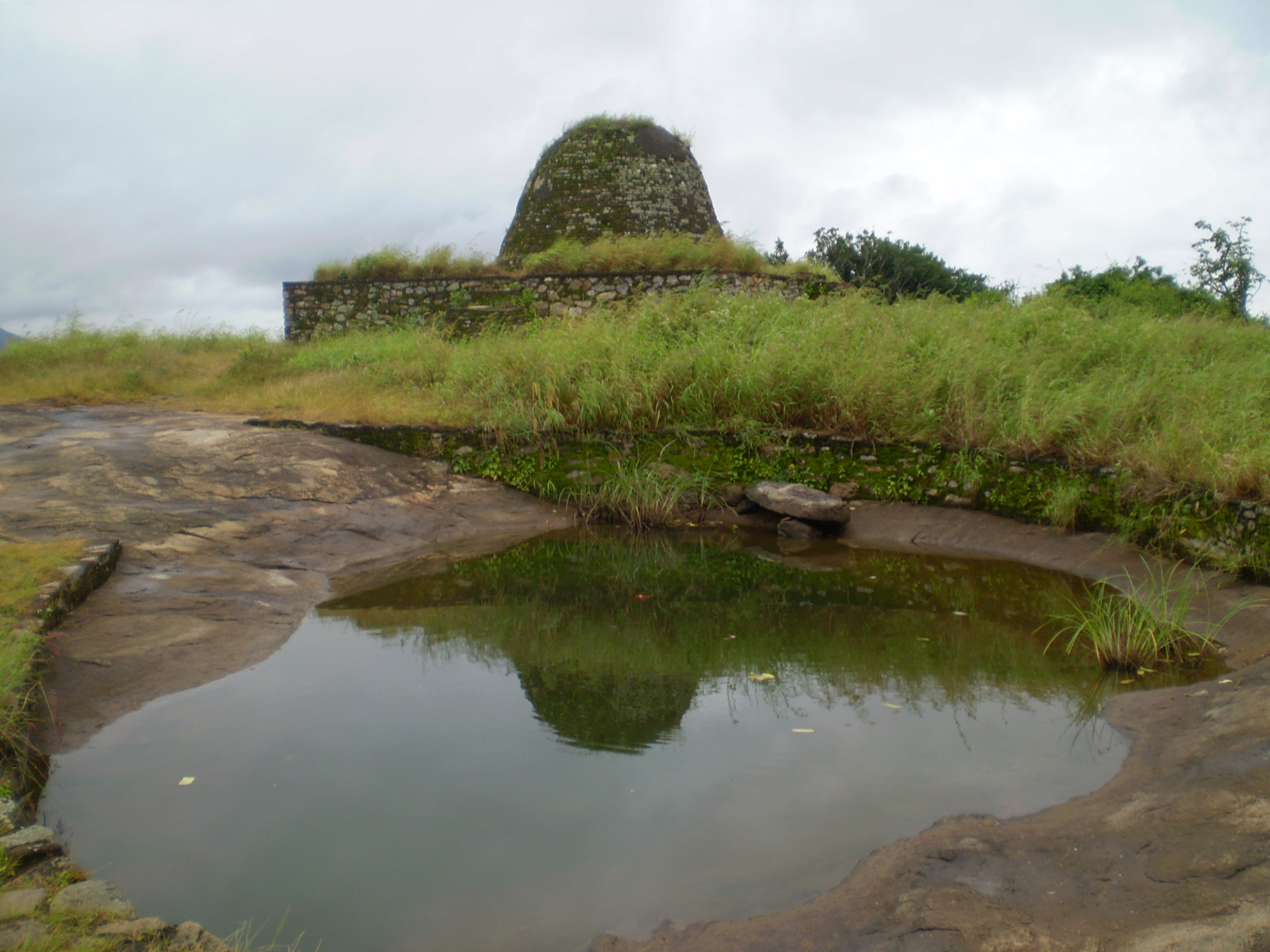
Ruined Stupa on the Yapahuwa Rock

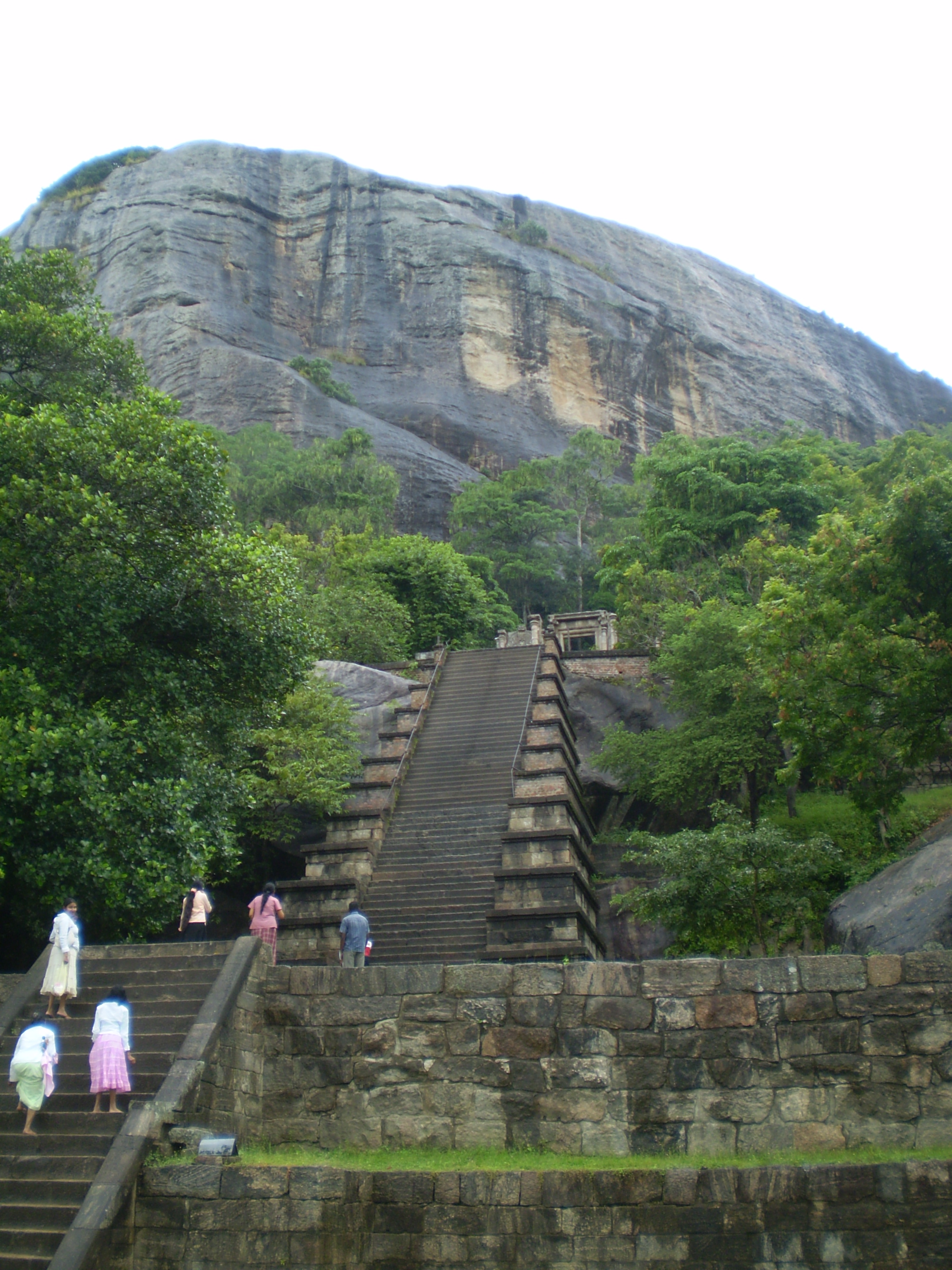
Staircase leading to the Rock

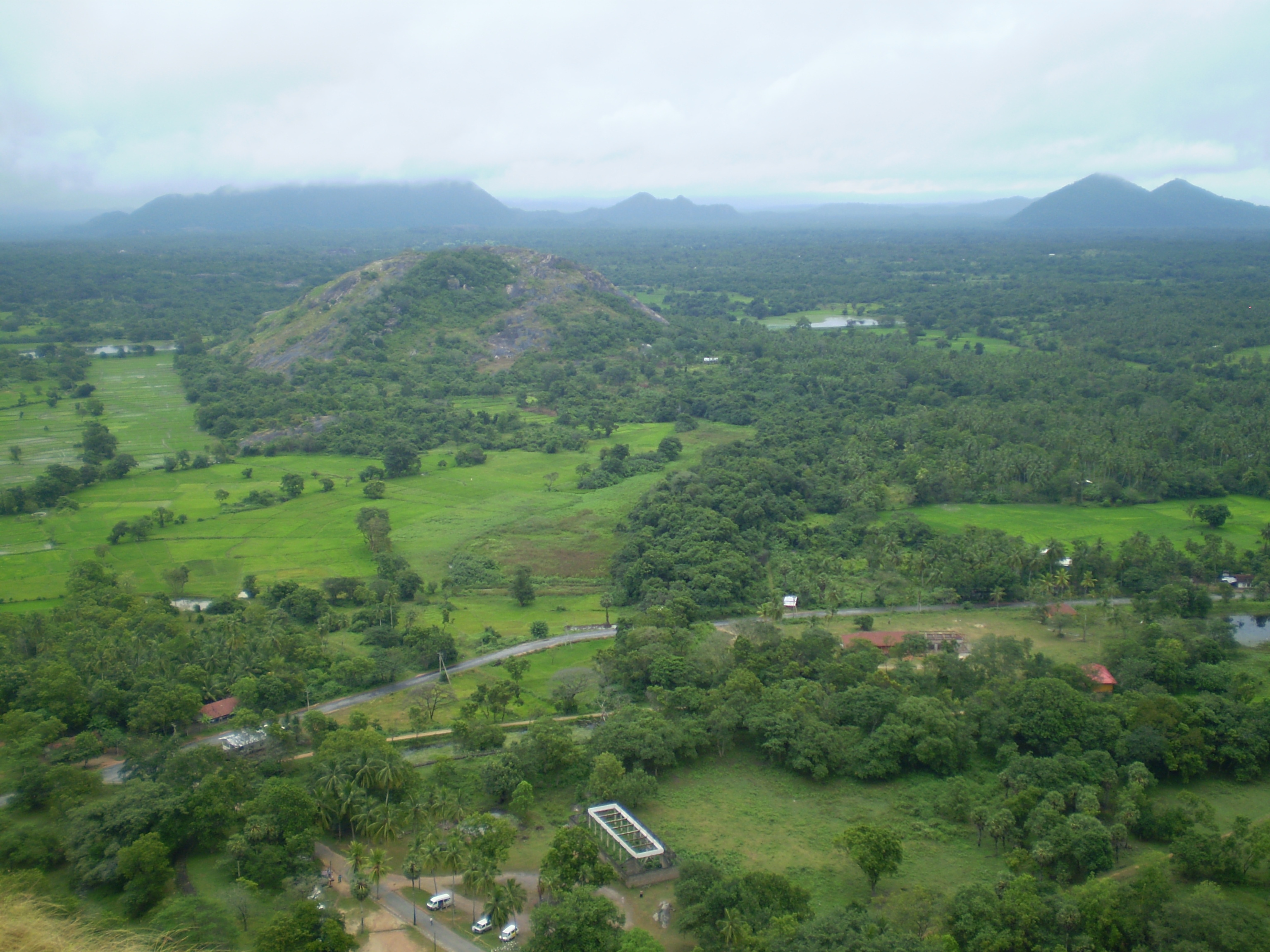
View from the top

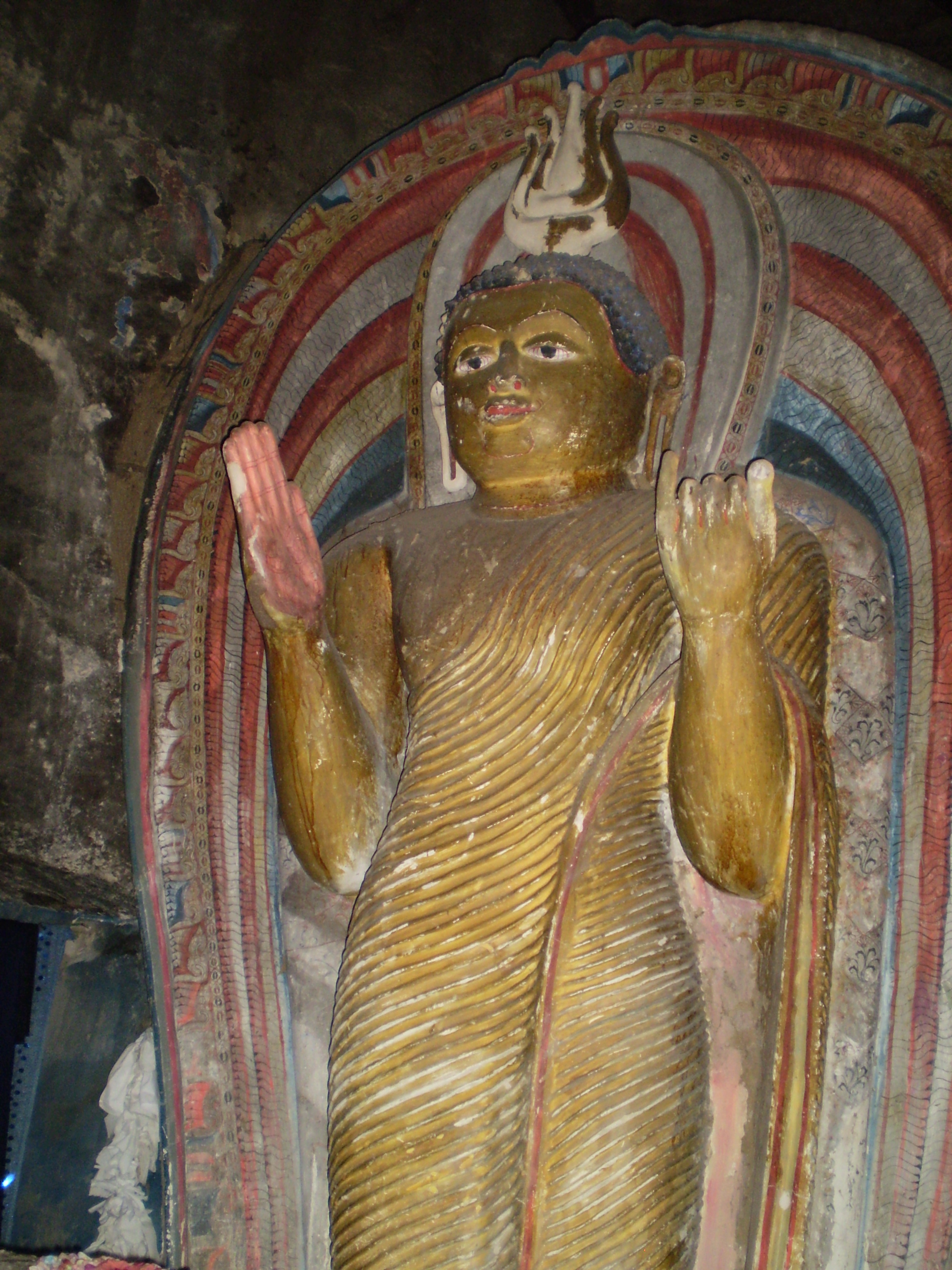
Buddha Statues in the temple (i)

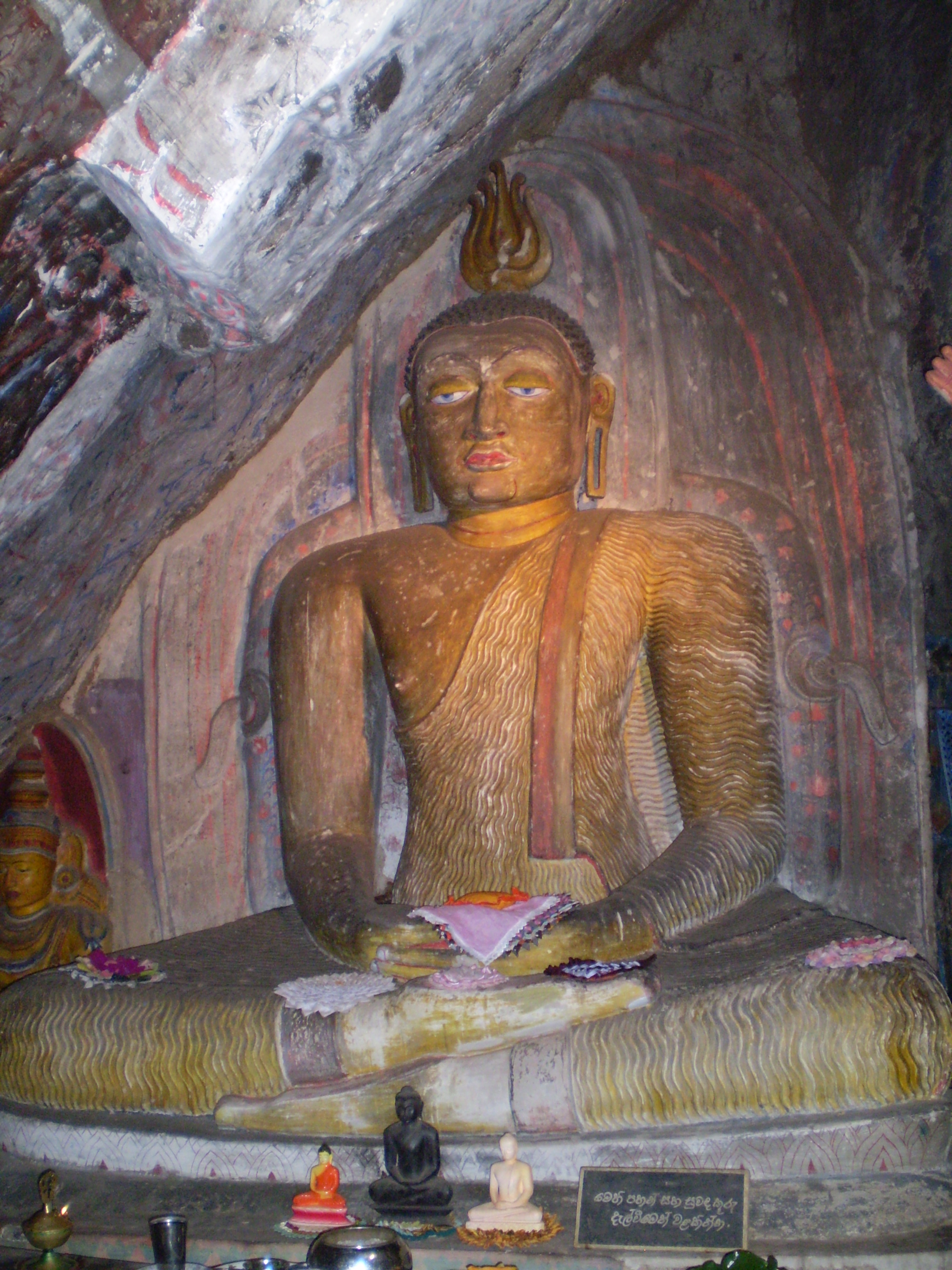
Buddha Statues in the temple (ii)

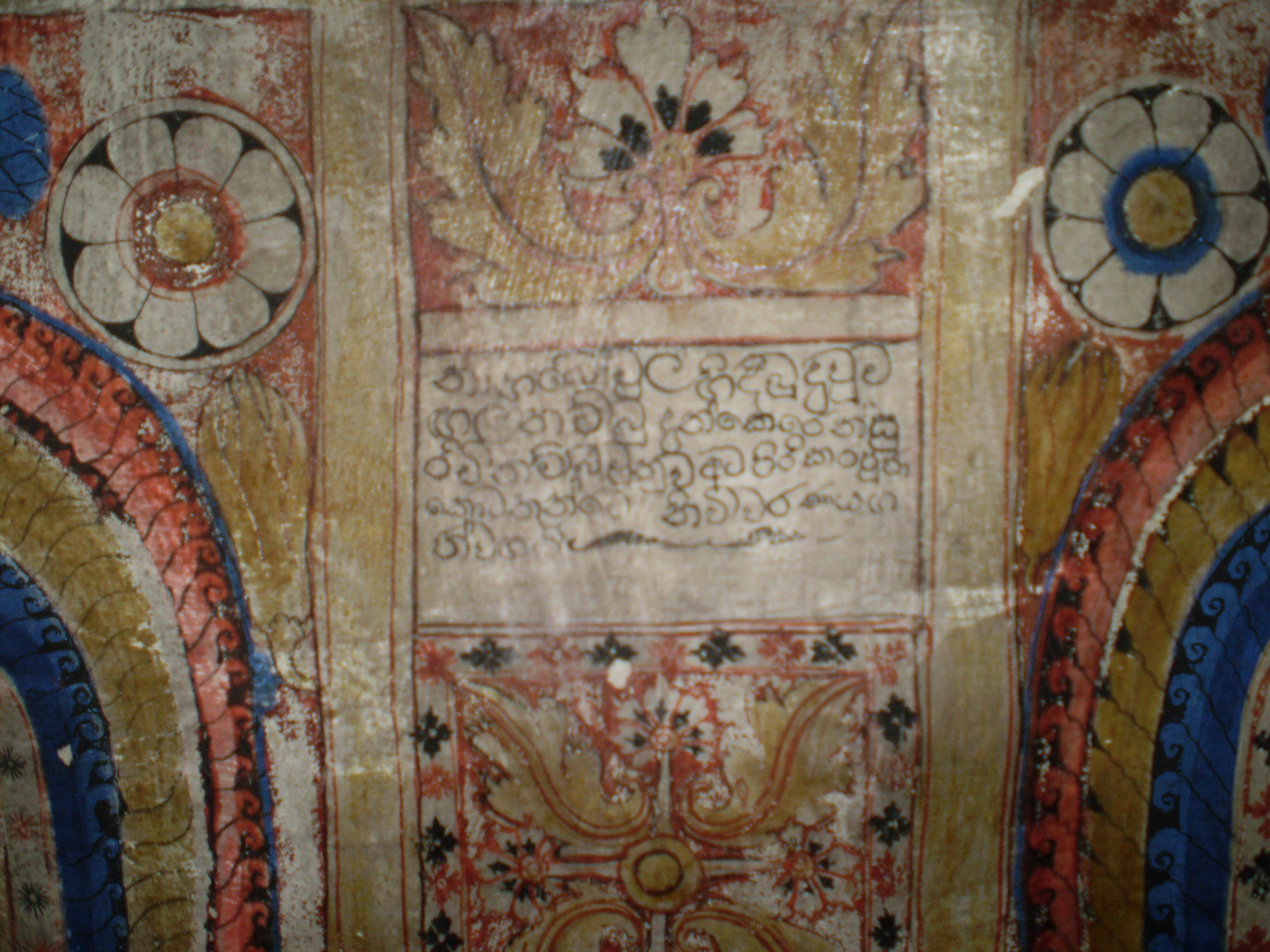
Kandyan era paintings inside the temple (i)

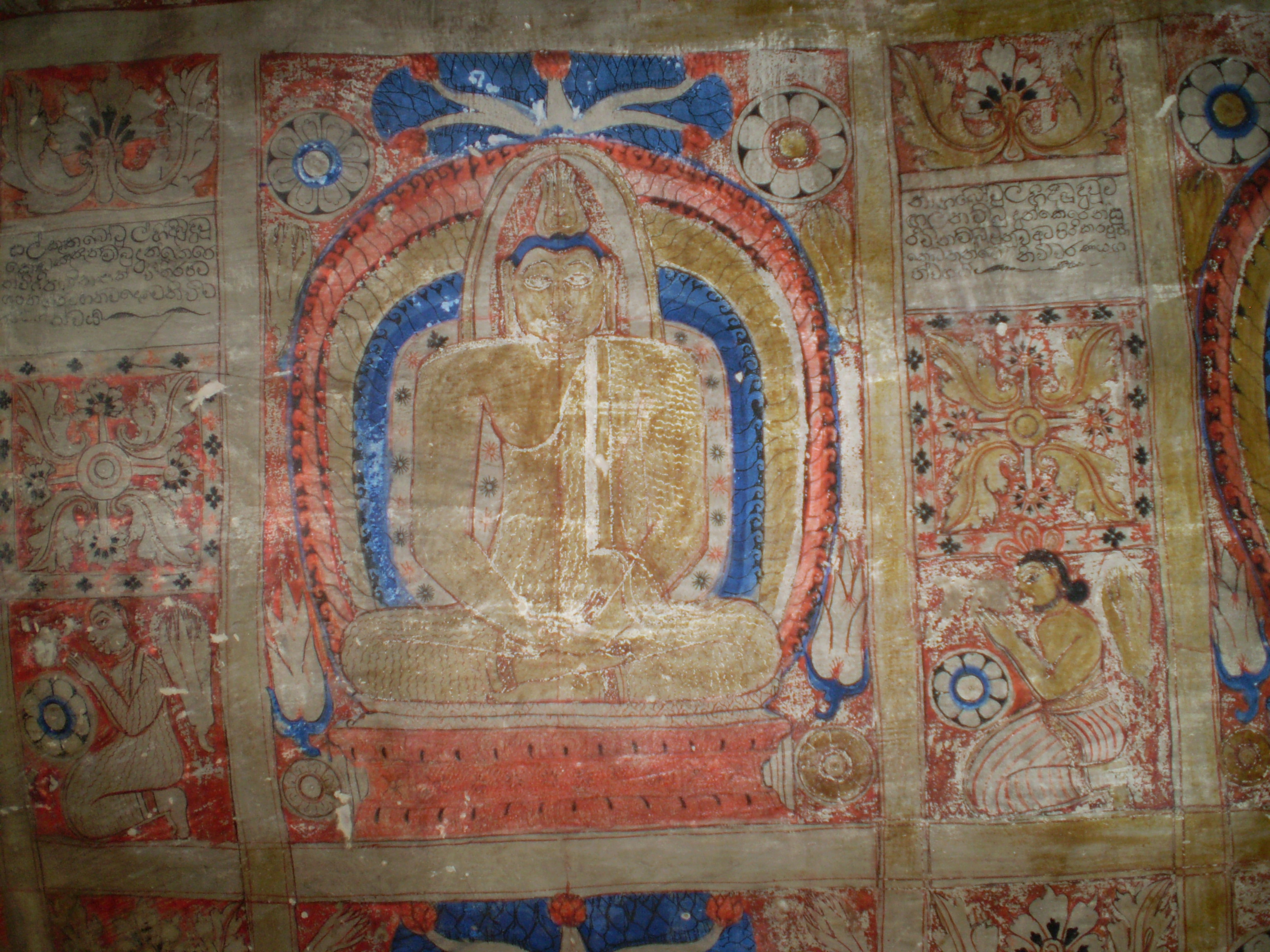
Kandyan era paintings inside the temple (ii)

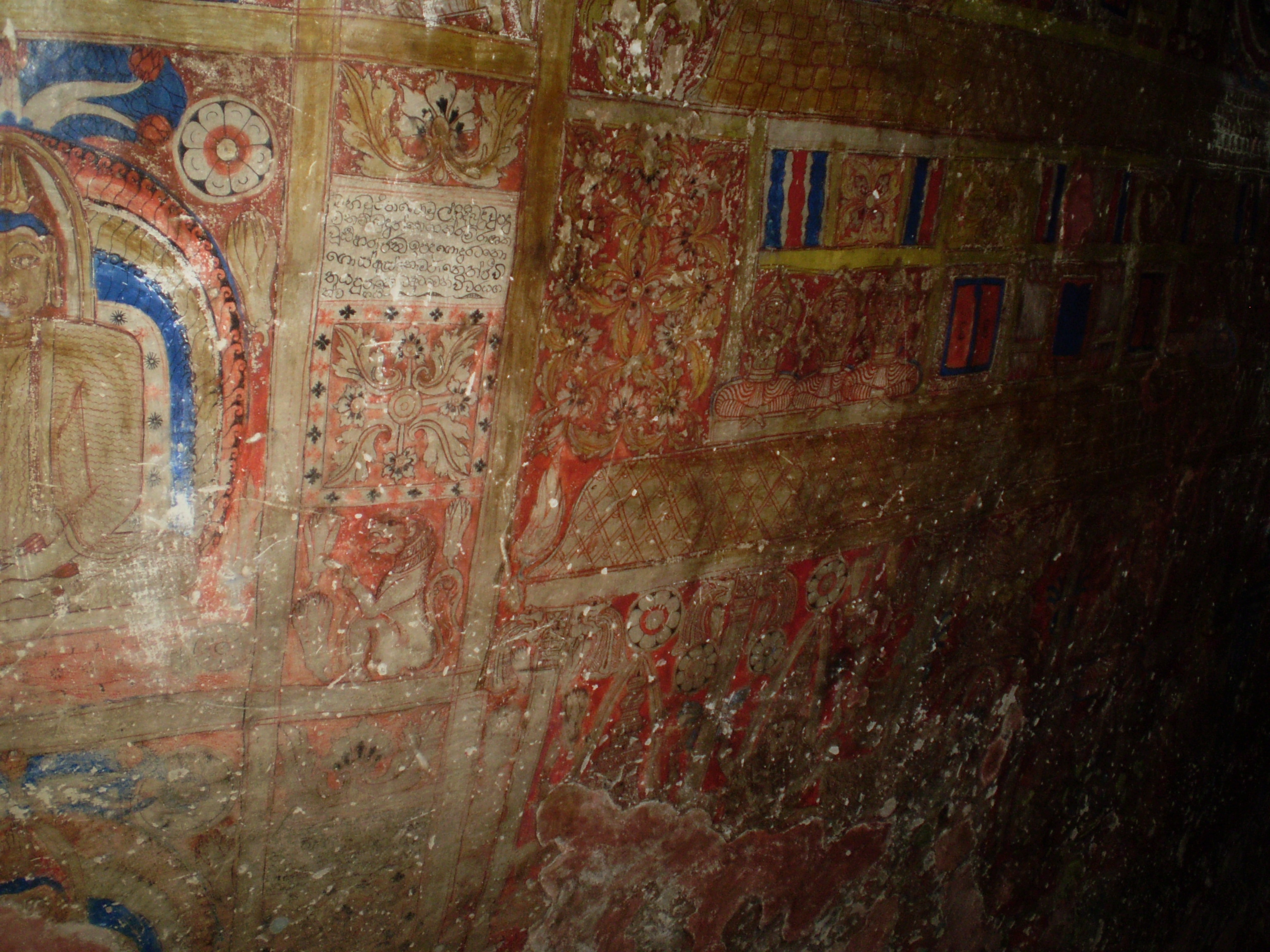
Kandyan era paintings inside the temple (iii)

== See also ==
- Sigiriya
- Mahawa, Sri Lanka
