= Family tree of Sinhalese monarchs =

This is the family tree of Sinhalese monarchs.

== House of Vijaya ==
The House of Vijaya claimed a close relationship to the Shakya dynasty, family of Siddhartha Gautama (Buddha).

King of Kalinga	Mahāsammata line of Kings
King of Vanga	Princess	Prince	Jayasena (Note: King of Kapilavastu)
The Lion	Suppadevi	Royal Standard Bearer	Kacchana	Sihahanu	Yasodhara	Anjana
Sinhabahu (Note: King of Sinhapura)	Sinhasivali	Amitodana	Ghattitdana Dhotodana; Sukkodana Pamita	Pajapati (Note: Same Person)	Pajapati Suddhodana	Maya (Note: Same Person)	Amita	Suppabuddha	Pajapati (Note: Same Person)	Maya (Note: Same Person)	Dandapani
Kuveni	Prince Vijaya (543 BC–505 BC)	Vijaya of Pandava (Note: King of Madhura)	Other Issues	Sumitta (Note: King of Sinhapura)	Princess of Madha	Pandu	Susima	Siddhartha	Subhaddakacchana	Devadatta
Jivatissa	Dissala	Other Issue	Panduvasdeva (504 BC–474 BC)	Bhaddakacchana	Dighaya	Rama Uruvela; Anuradha Vigita; Rohana Gamani	Rāhula
Vedda people	Other Issue	Abhaya (474 BC–454 BC)	Tissa (454 BC– 437 BC)	Girikandasiva	Citta	Dighagamani
Suvannapali	Pandukabhaya (437 BC– 367 BC)
Mutasiva of Anuradhapura (367 BC–307 BC)
Devanampiya Tissa (307 BC–267 BC)	Uttiya (267 BC–257 BC)	Mahanaga	Anula	Mahasiva (257 BC–247 BC)	Suratissa (247 BC–237 BC)	Asela (215 BC–205 BC)	Mattabhaya	Asoka	Uddhachulabhaya
Son	Issue	Yatala Tissa
Uttiya	Tissa	Gothabhaya
Vihara Devi	Kakavanna Tissa	Second spouse
Dutugamunu (161 BC–137 BC)	Anula	Saddha Tissa (137 BC–119 BC)	Dighabhaya
Asokamala	Sali	Thulatthana (119 BC–119 BC)	Lanja Tissa (119 BC–109 BC)	Khallata Naga (109 BC–104 BC)	Anuladevi	Valagamba (04 BC–103 BC) (89 BC–76 BC)	Somadevi
Mahakuli Mahatissa (76 BC–62 BC)	Chora Naga (62 BC–50 BC)	Anula (47 BC–42 BC)	Mahanaga	Siva I (47 BC) (Note: Consort to Anula)	Vatuka (47 BC) (Note: Consort to Anula)	Darubhatika Tissa (47 BC) (Note: Consort to Anula)	Niliya (47 BC) (Note: Consort to Anula)
Kuda Tissa (50 BC–47 BC)	Kutakanna Tissa (42 BC–20 BC)
Bhatikabhaya Abhaya (20 BC–9 AD)	Mahadathika Mahanaga (9–21)
Amandagamani Abhaya (21–30)	Kanirajanu Tissa (30–33)
Chulabhaya (33–35)	Sivali (35–35)
Ilanaga (38–44)	Mahamatta
Chandamukha (44–52)	Yassalalaka Tissa (52–60)

== House of Lambakanna I ==
Metta	Vasabha (66-110)
Vankanasika Tissa (110-113)	Mahamatta
Mahallaka Naga (135-141)
Bhatika Tissa (141-165)	Kanittha Tissa (165-193)	Queen	Gajabahu I (113-135)
Cula Naga (193-195)	Kuda Naga (195-196)	Queen
Siri Naga I (196-215)	Subhadeva
Abhaya Naga (237-245)	Voharika Tissa (215-237)	Queen
Siri Naga II (245-247)
Vijaya Kumara (247-248)
Sangha Tissa I (248-252) (Note: A Lambakanna)
Siri Sangha Bodhi I (252-254) (Note: A Lambakanna)
Gothabhaya (254-267) (Note: A Lambakanna)
Jettha Tissa I (267-277)	Mahasena (277-304)
Sirimeghavanna (304-332)	Jettha Tissa II (332-341)
Buddhadasa (341-370)
Upatissa I (370-412)	Spouse (Note: Tamil Spouse)	Mahanama (412-434)	Spouse (Note: Sinhala Spouse)
Soththisena (434-434)	Chattagahaka Jantu (434-435)
Mittasena (435-436)

== House of Moriya ==
Dhatusena; King of Anuradhapura r. 463–479
Moggallana I King of Anuradhapura r. 479–497	Kashyapa I King of Anuradhapura r. 497–515
Kumara Dhatusena; King of Anuradhapura r. 515–524	Siva II; King of Anuradhapura r. 524–525
Kittisena; King of Anuradhapura r. 524–524

== House of Vijayabahu ==
House of Lambakanna II
Mahinda IV (?–?); King of Anuradhapura r. 975–991	Queen Sundari (Note: Kālinga princess)	Prince Purandara, Dandanayaka (Admiral of the Fleet) (Note: Javan prince)	Suryanarayana (1)
Chola Empire	Suryanarayana (2)	Kassapa	Lokītā	Buddhā
Jagatīpāla (?–?); King of Anuradhapura r. 1043–1046	Suryanarayana (3), Dandanayaka (Admiral of the Fleet)	Loka	Mahāsāmi; Moggallāna of Ruhuna	Princess Lokitā	Pandya dynasty
Queen Līlāvatī (Note: Coḷa princess)	Vijayabahu I (1039–1110); 1st King of Polonnaruwa r. 1055–1110	Queen Tilokasundarī (Note: Kālinga princess)	Prince Vīrabāhu; Uparājā of Dakkhiṇadesa	Jayabahu I (?–?); 2nd King of Polonnaruwa r. 1110–1111	Prince Mahinda	Queen Mittā	King of Paṇḍu
Vīravamma	Princess Yasodharā	Princess Subhaddā	Princess Sumittā	Princess Lokanāthā	Princess Rūpavatī (Note: Died young & unmarried)	Prince Kittisirimegha	Prince Sirivallabha
Princess Sugalā Devi
Queen Līlāvatī	Vikramabahu I (?–1132); 3rd King of Polonnaruwa r. 1111–1132	Queen Sundarī (Note: Kālinga princess)	Princess Ratanāvalī	Prince Mānābharaṇa (Mānabhūsana)
Prince Mahinda	Gajabahu II (?–1187); 4th King of Polonnaruwa r. 1132–1153	Queen Bhaddavati	Queen Līlāvalī (1123–1186); 12th Queen of Polonnaruwa r. 1197–1200 r. 1209–1210 r. 1211–1212	Parakramabahu I (1123–1186); 5th King of Polonnaruwa r. 1153–1186	Queen Rūpavatī (Note: descendant of King Kittisiri Meghavanna)	Princess Mittā	Prince Mānābharaṇa	Princess Pabhāvatī	House of Kuliṅga
House of Kalinga
Vijayabahu II (?–?) (Note: Son of one of Parakramabahu I's sisters, it is not certain if it was Princess Bhaddavati); 6th King of Polonnaruwa r. 1186–1187	Nissaṅka Malla (1157–1196) (Note: Nephew or son-in-law of Parakramabahu I, uparāja of Vijayabāhu II, Also known as Kittinissaṅka); 8th King of Polonnaruwa r. 1187–1196	Princess Subhadra	Sirivallabha	Kittisirimegha	Mahinda VI (?–?) (Note: A man of the Kuliṅga clan who slew Vijayabahu II and reigned only for five days); 7th King of Polonnaruwa r. 1187–1187
Princess Sarvanga Sundari

== House of Kalinga ==
House of Kalinga
House of Vijayabahu	Suryanarayana I (Note: Srivijaya)
Parakramabahu I (1123–1186); 5th King of Polonnaruwa r. 1153–1186	Jayagopta (Note: Srivijaya)	Queen Pārvatī	Okkāka dynasty
Princess Subhadra	Nissaṅka Malla (1157–1196) (Note: Nephew or son-in-law of Parakramabahu I, uparāja of Vijayabāhu II, Also known as Kittinissaṅka); 8th King of Polonnaruwa r. 1187–1196	Kalyāṇavatī (?–?) (Note: First queen-consort of Nissaṅka Malla); 14th King of Polonnaruwa r. 1202–1208	Vikramabahu II (?–1196) (Note: Reigned for only three months); 10th King of Polonnaruwa r. 1196–1196	Princess	Pralambasta (Note: Srivijaya)	Sāhasamalla (?–?) (Note: Younger step-brother of Nissaṅka Malla); 13th King of Polonnaruwa r. 1200–1202	Pandya dynasty
Princess Sarvanga Sundari	Vīrabāhu (1179–1196) (Note: Ruled for only one night); 9th King of Polonnaruwa r. 1196–1196	Chodaganga (?–?) (Note: Also known as Coḷagaṅga, Reigned for only nine months); 11th King of Polonnaruwa r. 1196–1197	Suryanarayana II (Note: Srivijaya)	Spouse	Dhammāsoka (?–?) (Note: He was of royal blood, Reigned for only three months); 15th King of Polonnaruwa r. 1208–1209	Anīkaṅga (?–?) (Note: Reigned for only for seventeen days); 16th King of Polonnaruwa r. 1209–1209	Lokissara (?–?) (Note: A Tamil chief who came from India); 17th King of Polonnaruwa r. 1210–1211	Parakrama Pandyan II (?–?) (Note: A Paṇḍu king who deposed Queen Līlāvatī and captured the throne of Sri Lanka); 18th King of Polonnaruwa r. 1212–1215
Jayagopa (Note: Srivijaya)	Kalinga Māgha (?–?) (Note: A usurper from Kāliṅga); 19th King of Polonnaruwa r. 1215–1236; King of Jaffna r. 1236–1255	Pancandi (Note: Malayalee princess)
Chandrabhanu III (?–1262) (Note: A usurper from Kāliṅga); King of Tambralinga r. 1230–1262; King of Jaffna r. 1255–1262

== House of Sirisanghabodhi ==
Family tree of Sinahalese monarchs during the transitional period.

}}

Jayamahalena
Jayamahalena	Sunetra Devi
Princess Svarnnamanikya	Parakramabahu VI (?–?); 2nd King of Kotte r. 1411–1466	Mayadununuvara; Parakramabahu
Ulakudaya Devi	Bhuvanekabahu VI (?–?); 4th King of Kotte r. 1469–1477	Vīra Parakramabahu VIII (?–?); 6th King of Kotte r. 1477–1489
Jayavira Parakramabahu (?–?); 3rd King of Kotte r. 1466–1469	Pandita Parakramabahu VII (?–?); 5th King of Kotte r. 1477–1477
Dharma Parakramabahu IX (?–?); 7th King of Kotte r. 1489–1513	Taniyavalla Bahu	Sakalakalavalla	Sri Rajasinha Vijayabahu VI (?–?); 8th King of Kotte r. 1513–1521	Taniyavalla
Malabar Prince	Daughter	Maha Raigama Bandara (died age 10)	Bhuvanekabahu VII (?–1551); 9th King of Kotte r. 1521–1551	Junior Queen	Pararajasinha (?–); King of Raigama r. 1521–1538	Mayadunne (1501–1581); 1st King of Sitawaka r. 1521–1581	Kíraveli Rālahāmi	House of Vikramabahu
Tammiṭa Sūriya Baṇḍāra (Note: Also known as Dom Francisco Barreto)	Veediya Bandara	Samudra Devi	Crown Prince; Jugo Bandara (?–1544) (Note: Bhuvanekabahu's chosen heir until 1539.)	Crown Prince; Maha Rajjuru Bandara (died age 20)	Crown Prince; Timbiripola; Adahasin (?–1581)	Prince; Satana Bandara	Prince; Maha Tikiri; Adahasin	Rajasinha I (1544–1593); 2nd King of Sitawaka r. 1581–1593; 5th King of Kandy r. 1582–1592	Rana Baņdige (Note: A younger relative of Dharmapala)	Rajjuru Adasin (Note: A Kandyan possibly connected to the House of Dunuvila)
Parent of Dom João	House of Vikramabahu	Dharmapala (1538–1597); 10th King of Kotte r. 1551–1597	Vijayapala Adahasin	Nikapitiye Bandara (Note: Also known as Dom Filipe) (?–1610); 3rd King of Sitawaka r. 1593–1593	Crown Prince	2nd son	Menik Biso Bandara
Dom João	Rajasuriya (?–?); 4th King of Sitawaka r. 1593–1593	Jaya Surya Kumaraya
Pintiyapassiya Baņdāra	Mäduma Baņdāra	Hidda Baņdāra	Bulavala Baņdāra	2 unnamed sons	Māņik Bändige	Honda Bändige	Irrugalle Bändige	Uralavatta Baņdāra	Tîkiri Bändige	Daughter
Kumāra Astāna (Note: Adopted by Crown Prince Vijayapāla and nominated his heir)

== Kandyan monarchs ==
Family tree of Kandyan monarchs.

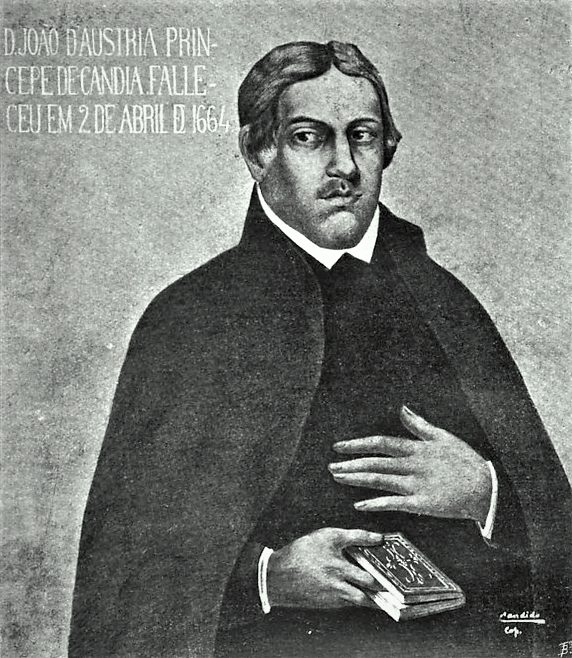
House of Vikramabahu	House of Sirisanghabodhi (Kotte line of Kings)
Sēnasammata Vikramabahu (?–1511); 1st King of Kandy r. 1469–1511	Princess	House of Kīravälle (Kotte noble house)
Daughter	Kīravälle Maha Rālahāmi
Princess of the Gampola Royal Line	Jayavira (Note: Also known as Dom Manoel) (?–?); 2nd King of Kandy r. 1511–1552	Kīravälle Biso Bandera	House of Vimaladharmasuriya	House of Dunuvila (Kandyan noble house)
Kumarasingha Adahasin	Karalliyadde Bandara (Note: Also known as Diyapita Väddi Maha Adasin and Dom João) (?–1582); 3rd King of Kandy r. 1551–1581	Gallegama Maha Adasin	Daughter	Dharmapala (1538–1597); 10th King of Kotte r. 1551–1597	Vīrasundara Baṇḍāra (?–1582)	Dunuvila Baņdige	Sister of Dunuvila Baņdige	Gamrāla Henarathhāmy
Wijayakon Mudaliyar (?–?) (Note: Leader of the revolt against Rajasinha I and proclaimed King for a period of six months while Yamasinghe Bandara returned.); Regent of Kandy r. 1592–1592	Crown Prince (?–~1588)	Yamasinghe Bandara (Note: Nephew of Karalliyadde Bandara. Also known as Dom Filipe) (?–1592); 6th King of Kandy r. 1592–1592	Kusumasana Devi (Note: Previously known as Mahabaņdige Adasin. Also known as Dona Catherina) (~1579–1612); 4th Queen of Kandy r. 1581–1581	Vimaladharmasuriya I (Note: Also known as Dom João) (?–1604); 7th King of Kandy r. 1592–1604	Senarat (?–1635); 8th King of Kandy r. 1604–1635	Uralavatta Baņdāra (Note: Cousin of Senerat)	Irrugalle Bändige
Susana de Abreu	Crown Prince Dom João (Note: Also known as the Black Prince of Lisbon) (1578–1642)	Crown Prince; Maha Astana (Note: Also known as Rajjuru Maha Adasin. Killed by Senarat.)	Crown Prince; Kumārasiṃha Astana (?–1634)	Princess; Sūriya Mahadassin (?–1617) (Note: Also known as Tikiri Adasin)	Princess; Antanassin (Note: Also known as Udamalla Adasin)	Jaffna Princess	Crown Prince Vijayapāla (Note: Also known as Dom Teodósio. Also known as Dom Joan or Kõnappu) (?–1654)	Kumāra Astāna (Note: Adopted by Crown Prince Vijayapāla)
Dona Maria de São João (Note: Also known as Dona Maria de Cândia) (1634–1708)	Simoa Batista (Note: Illegitimate daughter)	Väligama duggannā mahatmayo	Rajasinha II (1608–1687); 9th King of Kandy r. 1635–1687	2 Madurai princess	Nayaks of Kandy	Vijaya Raghava Nayak (1634–1673) (Note: King of Thanjavur Nayak kingdom)	Mampitiya Dissave
Monaravila Dissave	Vimaladharmasuriya II (?–1707); 10th King of Kandy r. 1687–1707	Madurai Spouse	Pitti Nayakkar	Vijaya Manna Naicker	Narenappa Nayakkar	Bintenna Dissave
Kandyan spouse/Royal consort	Vira Narendra Sinha (1690–1739); 11th King of Kandy r. 1707–1739	Madurai Spouse	Sri Vijaya Rajasinha (?–1747); 12th King of Kandy r. 1739–1747	Madurai Spouse	2 Madurai Spouses	Kirti Sri Rajasinha (1734–1782); 13th King of Kandy r. 1747–1782	Yakada Doli	Sri Rajadhi Rajasinha (?–1798); 14th King of Kandy r. 1782–1798	Queen Upendramma	Brother	Subbamma Nayaka	Sri Venkata Perumal
Royal Concubines	Madurai Spouse	4 Madurai Spouses (Note: Including daughter of Nadukattu Sami Nayakkar)
Son, Unambuwe Bandara (Note: Died young)	Children	Two sons	Six daughters	Sri Vikrama Rajasinha (1780–1832); 15th King of Kandy r. 1798–1815	Venkata Angammal

== See also ==
- List of Sri Lankan monarchs

== Bibliography ==
Web

- Malalasekera, G. P. (12 April 2025). "Dictionary of Pāli Proper Names". www.aimwell.org.

Books

- Bell, H. C. P. (1892). Report on the Kégalla district of the province of Sabaragamuwa by H.C.P. Bell, archaeological commissioner. Colombo: Ceylon Government.
- Rasanayagam, Mudaliyar C. (1926). Ancient Jaffna : being a research into the history of Jaffna from very early times to the Portuguese period (PDF). Madras: Everymans Publishers.
- Biedermann, Zoltán; Strathern, Alan (7 June 2017). Sri Lanka at the Crossroads of History. UCL Press. ISBN 978-1-911307-82-2.
- Dewaraja, Lorna Srimathie (2018). The Kandyan Kingdom of Sri Lanka, 1707 - 1782 (2. rev. ed.). Colombo: Lake House Investments. ISBN 9555520186.

Journals

- Paulusz, J. H. O. (1952). "Some Sinhalese Royal Families: A Memorandum compiled in 1676 by Governor Ryckloff van Goens the Younger". The Journal of the Ceylon Branch of the Royal Asiatic Society of Great Britain & Ireland. 2 (1): 21–30. ISSN 0304-2235.
- Chand Chirayu Rajani, M.C. (January 1976). "Review Article: Background to Sri Vijaya Story III". The Journal of the Siam Society (JSS). 64.1: 275–325.
- De Silva, C. R. (1977). "The rise and fall of the kingdom of Sitawaka (1521-1593)". The Ceylon Journal of Historical and Social Studies. VII (1): 1–43.
- Jayasinghe, Sagara (1 January 2015). "The Black Prince's Chapel: An architectural record of the Church of Our Lady of the Gate of Heaven, Telheiras, Lisbon". Oriente. 23: 56–77.

Theses

- Somaratna, Gintota Parana Vidanage (1969). Political history of the Kingdom of Kotte (c. A.D. 1400-1521) (PhD thesis). SOAS, University of London. doi:10.25501/SOAS.00029736.
- Dewaraja, Lorna Srimathie (1970). The Internal Politics of the Kandyan Kingdom 1707-1760 (PhD thesis). SOAS, University of London. doi:10.25501/SOAS.00033613.
- Kulasekera, Kulasekera Mudiyanselage Padmasiri (1984). British Administration in the Kandyan Provinces of Sri Lanka, 1815-1833, With Special Reference to Social Change (PhD thesis). SOAS, University of London. doi:10.25501/SOAS.00033753.
