= List of Sinhalese female monarchs =

Although over 180 monarchs have ruled the Sinhalese monarchy, only been four of them were female. This article lists those four monarchs. Two ruled during the Anuradhapura Period and the other two during the Polonnaruwa period.

== Anuradhapura Kingdom ==
=== Anula of Anuradhapura (47–42 BCE) ===
Anula was the first known queen regnant in both Sri Lankan history and the Anuradhapura period. She is also believed to be the first female head of state in all of Asia. She was from the House of Vijaya. First known to the public as the queen consort of King Chora Naga, son of King Valagambahu of Anuradhapura, she was infamous for murdering at least 6 of her husbands or consorts by poisoning them. Her second husband, Kuda Tissa, was actually the son of the brother of Chora Naga and ascended to the throne as his legal successor. Anula's other husbands who ascended to the throne were not legal successors of Chora Naga, but were merely husbands of then-present legal successor, Anula. They include (in chronological order) Siva I, Vatuka, Darubhatika Tissa and Niliya, who all ruled the country in the span of just one year. After the death of her final husband Niliya, she became the sole ruler of the kingdom for about 5 years, thus becoming the first known female monarch of Sri Lanka, however, she was also the real power behind the throne during the tenures of all her husbands. At the end of her tenure, she was deposed by Mahakuli Mahatissa's second son, Kutakanna Tissa. The Mahavamsa states that Kutakanna Tissa had Anula burnt on a funeral pyre. Other sources indicate that Anula was burnt alive in the palace where she had committed her murders.

=== Seevali of Anuradhapura (35 CE) ===
Seevali was the second known female monarch within Sri Lankan history and succeeded her brother Chulabhaya. She ruled the country only for about 4 months in the year 35 CE and was overthrown and succeeded by her nephew Ilanaga, presumably the son of her brother Chulabhaya, after an interregnum of 3 years. She was also from the House of Vijaya.

== Polonnaruwa kingdom ==
=== Lilavati of Polonnaruwa (1197–1200, 1209–1210, 1211–1212) ===
Lilavati was the fourth woman in Sri Lankan history to rule as sovereign in her own right. Lilavati rose to prominence as the wife of king Parakramabahu I. Being of royal descent herself, she then ruled as sole monarch on three occasions in the near-anarchy following Parakramabahu's death, with the backing of various generals.

=== Kalyanavati of Polonnaruwa (1202 – 1208) ===
Kalyanavati was the second female monarch to rule the Polonnaruwa kingdom. A member of the House of Kalinga, she was the widow of king Nissanka Malla. In 1202, the chief of the army, Ayasmanta, deposed king Sahassa Malla, and placed queen Kalyanavati on the throne as his successor. Her reign was described as a peaceful one. Ayasmanta managed most of the affairs of state in her place, Queen Kalyanavati is known to have founded religious monuments, most notably the vihara at Pannasalaka.

She was succeeded by king Dharmasoka, who was only three months old at the time of his ascension. It is unknown how her reign ended, but it is assumed that she was deposed. The reign of Ayasmanta continued, however, since he continued to serve as regent during the reign of Dharmasoka.

== Others ==
- Dona Catherina of Kandy
- Sugala of Ruhuna

== See also ==
- List of Sinhalese monarchs
