= List of state leaders in the 1st century BC =

State leaders in the 2nd century BC – State leaders in the 1st century– State leaders by year

This is a list of state leaders in the 1st century BC (100–1 BC).

== Africa ==
=== Africa: Northcentral ===
Libya

- Cyrene (complete list) –

- Ptolemy Apion, King (c.147–96 BC)

=== Africa: Northeast ===
Egypt

- Ptolemaic Kingdom of Egypt (complete list) –

- Ptolemy IX Lathyros, Pharaoh (116–110 BC, 110–109 BC, 88–81 BC)
- Ptolemy X Alexander I, Pharaoh (110–109 BC, 107–88 BC)
- Berenice III, Pharaoh (101–88 BC, 81–80 BC)
- Ptolemy XI Alexander II, Pharaoh (80 BC)
- Ptolemy XII Auletes, Pharaoh (80–58 BC, 55–51 BC)
- Cleopatra VI, Pharaoh (58–57 BC)
- Berenice IV, Pharaoh (58–55 BC)
- Ptolemy XIII Theos Philopator, Pharaoh (51–47 BC)
- Cleopatra VII, Pharaoh (51–30 BC)
- Arsinoe IV, Queen (48–47 BC)
- Ptolemy XIV, Pharaoh (47–44 BC)
- Caesarion, Pharaoh (44–30 BC)

Nubia

- Kush (complete list) –

- Tanyidamani, Qore (2nd–1st century BC)
- Naqyrinsan, Qore (early 1st century BC)
- Aqrakamani, Qore (late 1st century BC)
- Teriteqas, Qore (c.40 BC)
- Amanirenas, Kandake, Queen Regent (c.40–10 BC)
- Amanishakheto, Kandake, Queen Regent (c.10 BC–1 AD)
- Amanitore, Kandake, Queen Co-regent (c.40–10 BC)
- Amanikhabale, Qore (c.50–40 BC)

=== Africa: Northwest ===
Algeria

- Numidia (complete list) –

- Gauda, King (105–88 BC)
- Hiempsal II, King (88–60 BC)
- Juba I, King (60–46 BC)
- Juba II, client King under Rome (29–25 BC)

Morocco

- Mauretania (complete list) –

- Bocchus I, King (c.110–c.80s BC)
- Bocchus II, King (49–c.33 BC)
- Bogud, Co-King (49–c.38 BC)
- Juba II, client King under Rome (25 BC–23 AD)

== Asia ==
=== Asia: East ===
China

- Western Han, China (complete list) –

- Wu, Emperor (141–87 BC)
- Zhao, Emperor (87–74 BC)
- Liu He, Emperor (74 BC)
- Xuan Di, Emperor (74–49 BC)
- Yuan, Emperor (48–33 BC)
- Cheng, Emperor (33–7 BC)
- Ai, Emperor (7–1 BC)
- Ping, Emperor (1 BC–5 AD)

Korea: Three Kingdoms

- Baekje (complete list) –

- Onjo, King (18 BC–28 AD)

- Eastern Buyeo (complete list) –

- Hae Buru, King (86–48 BC)
- Geumwa, King (48–7 BC)
- Daeso, King (7 BC–22 AD)

- Goguryeo (complete list) –

- Dongmyeong, King (37–19 BC)
- Yuri, King (19 BC–18 AD)

- Silla (complete list) –

- Hyeokgeose, King (57 BC–4 AD)

=== Asia: South ===
India

- Kanva dynasty (complete list) –

- Vasudeva (c.75–c.66 BC)
- Bhumimitra (c.66–c.52 BC)
- Narayana (c.52–c.40 BC)
- Susharman (c.40–c.30 BC)

- Satavahana dynasty (Purana-based chronology) –

- Satakarni II, King (141–85 BC)
- Lambodara, King (85–67 BC)
- Apilaka, King (67–55 BC)
- Meghasvati, King (55–37 BC)
- Svati, King (37–19 BC)
- Skandasvati, King (19–12 BC)
- Mrigendra Satakarni, King (12–9 BC)
- Kunatala Satakarni, King (9–1 BC)
- Satakarni III, King (1 BC–1 AD)

- Northern Satraps (complete list) –

- Hagamasha, Satrap (late 1st century BC)
- Hagana, Satrap (late 1st century BC)

- Shunga Empire (complete list) –

- Devabhuti, Emperor (83–73 BC)

Pakistan

- Apracharajas (complete list) –

- Indravarman, Raja (1st century BC)
- Vijayamitra, Raja (12 BC–15 AD)

Sri Lanka

- Anuradhapura Kingdom (complete list) –

- Pulahatta, King (103–100 BC)
- Bahiya, King (100–98 BC)
- Panya Mara, King (98–91 BC)
- Pilaya Mara, King (91–90 BC)
- Dathika, King (90–88 BC)
- Valagamba, King (104–103, c.89–77 BC)
- Mahakuli Mahatissa, King (76–62 BC)
- Chora Naga, King (62–50 BC)
- Kuda Tissa, King (50–47 BC)
- Siva I, King (47–47 BC)
- Vatuka, King (47–47 BC)
- Darubhatika Tissa, King (47–47 BC)
- Niliya, King (47–47 BC)
- Anula, King (47–42 BC)
- Kutakanna Tissa, King (42–20 BC)
- Bhatikabhaya Abhaya, King (20 BC–9 AD)

=== Asia: West ===
- Bithynia (complete list) –

- Nicomedes III Euergetes, King (127–94 BC)
- Nicomedes IV Philopator, King (94–74 BC)
- Socrates Chrestus, King (c.90 BC)

- Cappadocia (complete list) –

- Ariarathes VIII, client King under Rome (101–96 BC)
- Ariarathes IX, nominal King under Pontus (c. 95 BC)
- Ariobarzanes I, client King (95–c.63 BC)
- Ariobarzanes II, client King under Rome (c.63–51 BC)
- Ariobarzanes III, client King under Rome (51–42 BC)
- Ariarathes X, client King under Rome (42–36 BC)
- Archelaus, client King under Rome (36 BC–17 AD)

- Characene (complete list) –

- Tiraios I, King (95/94–90/89 BC)
- Tiraios II, King (79/78–49/48 BC)
- Artabazos I, King (49/48–48/47 BC)
- Attambelos I, King (47/46–25/24 BC)
- Theonesios I, King (c.19/18)
- Attambelos II, King (c.17/16 BC–8/9 AD)

- Bosporan Kingdom (complete list) –

- Asander, client King under Rome (47 BC, 44–17 BC)
- Dynamis, client Queen under Rome (47–14 BC)
- Mithridates, client King under Rome (47–44 BC)
- Scribonius, King (17–16 BC)
- Aspurgus, client King under Rome (8 BC–38 AD)

- Colchis (complete list) –

- Mithridates, client King under Pontus (fl. 65 BC)
- Machares, client King under Pontus (fl. 65 BC)
- Aristarchus, client King under Rome (65–47 BC)

- Commagene (complete list) –

- Mithridates I, King (109–70 BC)
- Antiochus I, King (70–38 BC)
- Mithridates II, King (38–20 BC)
- Mithridates III, King (20–12 BC)
- Antiochus III, King (12 BC–17 AD)

- Elymais (complete list) –

- Kamnaskires III Megas Nikephorus, client King under Parthia (c.85 BC)
- Kamnaskires IV, client King under Parthia (c.82/1–c.76/5 BC)
- Kamnaskires V, client King under Parthia (c.73/2–c.46 BC)
- Kamnaskires VI, client King under Parthia (c.46–c.28 BC)
- Kamnaskires VII, client King under Parthia (c.28 BC–c.1 AD)

- Indo-Greek Kingdom (complete list) –

- Antialcidas, King of Paropamisade, Arachosia, and Gandhara (115–95 BC)
- Heliokles II, King of Gandhara and Punjab (110–100 BC)
- Polyxenios, King of Paropamisade and Arachosia (c.100 BC)
- Demetrius III, King of Gandhara and Punjab (c.100 BC)
- Philoxenus, King of Paropamisade, Arachosia, Gandhara, and Punjab (100–95 BC)
- Diomedes, King of Paropamisade (95–90 BC)
- Amyntas, King of Arachosia and Gandhara (95–90 BC)
- Epander, King of Punjab (95–90 BC)
- Theophilos, King of Paropamisade (c.90 BC)
- Peukolaos, King of Arachosia and Gandhara (c.90 BC)
- Nicias, King of Paropamisade (90–85 BC)
- Menander II, King of Arachosia and Gandhara (90–85 BC)
- Hermaeus, King of Paropamisade (90–70 BC)
- Archebius, King of Arachosia, Gandhara, and Punjab (90–80 BC)
- Maues, Indo-Scythian King of Paropamisade, Arachosia, Gandhara, and Punjab (85–60 BC)
- Artemidoros, King of Gandhara/Punjab (c.80 BC)
- Apollodotus II, King of Punjab (80–65 BC)
- Telephos, King of Gandhara (75–70 BC)
- Hippostratos, King of Western Punjab (65–55 BC)
- Dionysios, King of Eastern Punjab (65–55 BC)
- Zoilos II, King of Eastern Punjab (55–35 BC)
- Apollophanes, King of Eastern Punjab (35–25 BC)
- Strato II and Strato III, Kings of Eastern Punjab (25 BC–10 AD)

- Indo-Scythian Kingdom (complete list) –

- Maues, King (c.85–60 BC)
- Vonones, King (c.75–65 BC)
- Spalahores, King (c.75–65 BC)
- Spalirises, King (c.60–57 BC)
- Azes I, King (c.57–35 BC)
- Azilises, King (c.57–35 BC)
- Azes II, King (c.35–12 BC)
- Zeionises, Sub-king (c.10 BC–10 AD)
- Kharahostes, Sub-king (c.10 BC–10 AD)

- Judea: Hasmonean dynasty (complete list) –

- Alexander Jannaeus, King and High Priest (103–76 BC)
- Alexandra Salome, Queen (76–67 BC)
- John Hyrcanus II

- High Priest (76–66, 63–40 BC)
- King (67–66 BC)
- Ethnarch (47–40 BC)

- Aristobulus II, King and High Priest (66–63 BC)
- Antipater, Procurator (47–44 BC)
- Antigonus, King and High Priest (40–37 BC)

- Judea: Herodian dynasty (complete list) –

- Herod the Great, client King under Rome (37–4 BC)

- Nabataea (complete list) –

- Aretas II, King (120/110–96 BC)
- Obodas I, King (c.96–85 BC)
- Aretas III, King (84–60/59 BC)
- Obodas II, King (62/61–60/59 BC)
- Malichus I, King (59–30 BC)
- Obodas III, King (30–9 BC)
- Aretas IV Philopatris, King (9/8 BC–39/40 AD)

- Osroene (complete list) –

- Bakru II, King (112–94 BC)
- Ma'nu I, King (94 BC)
- Abgar I, King (94–68 BC)
- Abgar II, King (68–52 BC)
- Ma'nu II, King (52–34 BC)
- Paqor of, King (34–29 BC)
- Abgar III, King (29–26 BC)
- Abgar IV, King (26–23 BC)
- Ma'nu III, King (23–4 BC)
- Abgar V, King (4 BC–7 AD, 13–50)

- Parthian Empire (complete list) –

- Mithridates II, Great King, Shah (124–88 BC)
- Gotarzes I, Great King, Shah (95–90 BC)
- Orodes I, Great King, Shah (90–80 BC)
- Sanatruces, Great King, Shah (77–70 BC)
- Phraates III, Great King, Shah (70–57 BC)
- Mithridates III, Great King, Shah (57–54 BC)
- Orodes II, Great King, Shah (57–38 BC)
- Pacorus I,§ Great King, Shah (51 BC)
- Phraates IV, Great King, Shah (37–2 BC)
- Tiridates II,§ Great King, Shah (32 BC)
- Musa, Great Queen, Shah (2 BC–4 AD)
- Phraates V, Great King, Shah (2 BC–4 AD)

- Pontus (complete list) –

- Mithridates VI, King (120–63 BC)
- Pharnaces II, client King under Rome (63–47 BC)
- Darius, client King under Rome (39–37 BC)
- Arsaces, client King under Rome (c.37 BC)
- Polemon I, client King under Rome (37–8 BC)
- Pythodorida, client Queen under Rome (8 BC–38 AD)

- Seleucid Empire (complete list) –

- Antiochus IX Cyzicenus, King (114–96 BC)
- Seleucus VI Epiphanes, King (96–95 BC)
- Antiochus X Eusebes, King (95–92/83 BC)
- Antiochus XI Epiphanes, King (95–87 BC)
- Demetrius III Eucaerus, King (95–92 BC)
- Philip I Philadelphus, King (95–84/83 BC)
- Antiochus XII Dionysus, King (87–84 BC)
- Seleucus VII Kybiosaktes, King (83–69 BC)
- Antiochus XIII Asiaticus, King (69–64 BC)
- Philip II Philoromaeus, King (65–63 BC)

== Europe ==
=== Europe: Balkans ===
- Sapaean kingdom of Thrace (complete list) –

- Cotys I, King (57–48 BC)
- Rhescuporis I, King (48–41 BC)

- Odrysian kingdom of Thrace (complete list) –

- Teres III, King (c.149 BC)
- Beithys, King (140–120 BC)
- Cotys V, King (120–? BC)
- Sadalas I, King (87–79 BC)
- Cotys VI, King (57–48 BC)
- Sadalas II, King (48–42 BC)
- Sadalas III, King (42–31 BC)
- Rhescuporis II, King (18–13 BC)
- Rhascus, King (18–11 BC)
- Rhoemetalces I, King (12 BC–12 AD)

=== Europe: British Isles ===
- Atrebates (complete list) –

- Commius, King (57–c.22 BC
- Tincomarus, King (c.22–8 AD)
- Eppillus, King (8–15)
- Verica, King (15–40)

- Catuvellauni (complete list) –

- Cassivellaunus, Chieftain/Leader (c. 54 BC)
- Tasciovanus, King (c.20 BC–9 AD)

=== Europe: Central ===
- Marcomanni (complete list) –

- Maroboduus, King (9 BC–19 AD)

=== Europe: East ===
- Dacia (complete list) –

- Charnabon, King (5th century BC)
- Histrianorum, King (c.339 BC)
- Cothelas, King (4th century BC)
- Dual, King (3rd century BC)
- Rhemaxos, King (c.200 BC)
- Moskon, King (3rd century BC)
- Dromichaetes, King (3rd century BC)
- Zalmodegicus, King (late 3rd century BC)
- Rubobostes, King (2nd century BC)
- Oroles, King (2nd century BC)
- Dicomes, King (1st century BC)
- Rholes, King (1st century BC)
- Dapyx, King (1st century BC)
- Cotiso, King (1st century BC)
- Zyraxes, King (1st century BC)
- Burebista, King (82–44 BC)
- Comosicus, King (44 BC–28 AD)

=== Europe: South ===
- Roman Republic (complete list) –

- 100

- Gaius Marius, Consul
- Lucius Valerius Flaccus, Consul

- 99

- Marcus Antonius, Consul
- Aulus Postumius Albinus, Consul

- 98

- Quintus Caecilius Metellus Nepos, Consul
- Titus Didius, Consul

- 97

- Gnaeus Cornelius Lentulus, Consul
- Publius Licinius Crassus, Consul

- 96

- Gnaeus Domitius Ahenobarbus, Consul
- Gaius Cassius Longinus, Consul

- 95

- Lucius Licinius Crassus, Consul
- Quintus Mucius Scaevola Pontifex, Consul

- 94

- Gaius Coelius Caldus, Consul
- Lucius Domitius Ahenobarbus, Consul

- 93

- Gaius Valerius Flaccus, Consul
- Marcus Herennius, Consul

- 92

- Gaius Claudius Pulcher, Consul
- Marcus Perperna, Consul

- 91

- Lucius Marcius Philippus, Consul
- Sextus Julius Caesar, Consul

- 90

- Lucius Julius Caesar, Consul
- Publius Rutilius Lupus, Consul

- 89

- Gnaeus Pompeius Strabo, Consul
- Lucius Porcius Cato, Consul

- 88

- Lucius Cornelius Sulla, Consul
- Quintus Pompeius Rufus, Consul

- 87

- Gnaeus Octavius, Consul
- Lucius Cornelius Cinna, Consul
- Lucius Cornelius Merula, Suffect consul

- 86

- Lucius Cornelius Cinna, Consul
- Gaius Marius, Consul
- Lucius Valerius Flaccus, Suffect consul

- 85

- Lucius Cornelius Cinna, Consul
- Gnaeus Papirius Carbo, Consul

- 84

- Gnaeus Papirius Carbo, Consul
- Lucius Cornelius Cinna, Consul

- 83

- Lucius Cornelius Scipio Asiaticus, Consul
- Gaius Norbanus, Consul

- 82

- Gaius Marius the Younger, Consul
- Gnaeus Papirius Carbo, Consul

- 81

- Lucius Cornelius Sulla, Dictator (82–79 BC)
- Marcus Tullius Decula, Consul
- Gnaeus Cornelius Dolabella, Consul

- 80

- Lucius Cornelius Sulla, Consul
- Quintus Caecilius Metellus Pius, Consul

- 79

- Publius Servilius Vatia Isauricus, Consul
- Appius Claudius Pulcher, Consul

- 78

- Marcus Aemilius Lepidus, Consul
- Quintus Lutatius Catulus, Consul

- 77

- Decimus Junius Brutus, Consul
- Mamercus Aemilius Lepidus Livianus, Consul

- 76

- Gnaeus Octavius, Consul
- Gaius Scribonius Curio, Consul

- 75

- Lucius Octavius, Consul
- Gaius Aurelius Cotta, Consul

- 74

- Lucullus, Consul
- Marcus Aurelius Cotta, Consul

- 73

- Marcus Terentius Varro Lucullus, Consul
- Gaius Cassius Longinus, Consul

- 72

- Lucius Gellius Publicola, Consul
- Gnaeus Cornelius Lentulus Clodianus, Consul

- 71

- Publius Cornelius Lentulus Sura, Consul
- Gnaeus Aufidius Orestes, Consul

- 70

- Pompey, Consul
- Marcus Licinius Crassus, Consul

- 69

- Quintus Hortensius, Consul
- Quintus Caecilius Metellus Creticus, Consul

- 68

- Lucius Caecilius Metellus, Consul
- Quintus Marcius Rex, Consul

- 67

- Gaius Calpurnius Piso, Consul
- Manius Acilius Glabrio, Consul

- 66

- Manius Aemilius Lepidus, Consul
- Lucius Volcatius Tullus, Consul

- 65

- Lucius Aurelius Cotta, Consul
- Lucius Manlius Torquatus, Consul

- 64

- Lucius Julius Caesar, Consul
- Gaius Marcius Figulus, Consul

- 63

- Marcus Tullius Cicero, Consul
- Gaius Antonius Hybrida, Consul

- 62

- Decimus Junius Silanus, Consul
- Lucius Licinius Murena, Consul

- 61

- Marcus Pupius Piso Frugi Calpurnianus, Consul
- Marcus Valerius Messalla Niger, Consul

- 60

- Quintus Caecilius Metellus Celer, Consul
- Lucius Afranius, Consul

- 59

- Julius Caesar, Consul
- Marcus Calpurnius Bibulus, Consul

- 58

- Lucius Calpurnius Piso Caesoninus, Consul
- Aulus Gabinius, Consul

- 57

- Publius Cornelius Lentulus Spinther, Consul
- Quintus Caecilius Metellus Nepos, Consul

- 56

- Gnaeus Cornelius Lentulus Marcellinus, Consul
- Lucius Marcius Philippus, Consul

- 55

- Pompey, Consul
- Marcus Licinius Crassus, Consul

- 54

- Lucius Domitius Ahenobarbus, Consul
- Appius Claudius Pulcher, Consul

- 53

- Gnaeus Domitius Calvinus, Consul
- Marcus Valerius Messalla Rufus, Consul

- 52

- Pompey, Consul
- Quintus Caecilius Metellus Pius Scipio Nasica, Consul

- 51

- Servius Sulpicius Rufus, Consul
- Marcus Claudius Marcellus, Consul

- 50

- Lucius Aemilius Paullus, Consul
- Gaius Claudius Marcellus, Consul

- 49

- Gaius Claudius Marcellus, Consul
- Lucius Cornelius Lentulus Crus, Consul

- Julius Caesar, Dictator (49–44 BC)
- Marcus Aemilius Lepidus, Triumvir of the Africa Province (43–36 BC)
- Mark Antony, Triumvir of the East (43–27 BC)
- Augustus/ Octavian, Triumvir of the West (43–27 BC)

- Roman Empire: Principate (complete list) –

- Augustus/ Octavian, Principate, Emperor (27 BC–14 AD)

=== Eurasia: Caucasus ===
- Armenia (complete list) –

Artaxiad Dynasty
- Artavasdes I, King (123–95 BC)
- Tigranes II, the Great, King (95–55 BC)
- Artavasdes II, King (55–34 BC)
- Artaxias II, King (33–20 BC)
- Tigranes III, King (20–10 BC)
- Tigranes IV, King, co-monarch (10–2 BC)
- Erato, Queen, co-monarch (10–2 BC)
non-dynastic
- Ariobarzanes, client King under Rome (2 BC–4)

- Iberia (Kartli) (complete list) –

- Pharnajom, King (109–90 BC)
- Artaxias I, King (90–78 BC)
- Artoces, King (78–63 BC)
- Pharnavaz II, King (63–32 BC)
- Mirian II, King (30–20 BC)
- Arshak II, King (20 BC–1 AD)
