= Abhaya =

Abhaya may refer to:

== People with the name ==
=== Historical ===
- Abhaya of Upatissa Nuwara, king of Upathissa Nuwara from 474 to 454 BCE
- Abhaya Malla (died 1255), Malla Dynasty king of Nepal
- Abhaya Naga of Anuradhapura (reigned 237–245 CE)
- Amandagamani Abhaya of Anuradhapura (reigned 21–30 CE)
- Bhatikabhaya Abhaya of Anuradhapura (reigned 20 BCE – 9 CE)
- Dutugamunu (reigned 161–137 BCE), Sri Lankan king also known as Dutthagamani Abhaya
- Valagamba of Anuradhapura (reigned after 103 BCE), also known as Vattagamani Abhaya

=== Modern ===
- Sister Abhaya, the victim in the 1992 Sister Abhaya murder case of Kottayam, Kerala
- Abhaya Indrayan (born 1945), Indian biostatistician
- Abhaya Induruwa (born 1950), Sri Lankan computer scientist
- Abhaya Simha (born 1981), Kannada film director
- Abhaya Subba, Nepalese singer-songwriter and musician

== Other uses ==
- Abhaya (film), a 2017 Indian film
- Abhayamudra, a symbolic or ritual gesture in Hinduism and Buddhism
- Abhaya: The Legend of Diwali, a book on a princess of the fictional city of Anagha

== See also ==
- Abhay (disambiguation)
- Abhayam (disambiguation)
- Abhayagiri (disambiguation)
