= Cula =

Cula may refer to:

== People ==
- Cula Naga of Anuradhapura
- Penny Cula-Reid (born 1988), Australian Australian rules football player
- Slaviša Čula (born 1968), Serbian football player

== Other ==
- Culă, Romanian semi-fortified building
- Cúla4, Irish TV channel
- CULA, fictitious university in Legally Blonde
- CULA, Liberal Democrats branch at the University of Cambridge
