= Gothabhaya of Anuradhapura =

Sri Lankan king of Anuradhapura from 254 to 267

Gothabhaya ගෝඨාභය
- King of Anuradhapura
- Reign: 249–262 AD
- Predecessor: Siri Sangha Bodhi I
- Successor: Jettha Tissa I
- Died: 262 AD
- Issue: Jettha Tissa I Mahasena
Regnal name
- Meghavannabhaya
- House: House of Lambakanna I
- Religion: Therevada Buddhism

Gothabhaya (Sinhala: ගෝඨාභය), also known as Meghavannabhaya, Gothakabhaya and Goluaba, was a king of the Anuradhapura Kingdom of Sri Lanka whose reign lasted from 249 to 262 AD. During his reign, Gothabhaya renovated several temples and monasteries and also built a new temple. He is the last of three princes who seized the throne from King Vijaya Kumara and ruled the country. He is known for banishing 60 Buddhist monks who followed teaching contradictory to Theravada, and also for rebelling against his friend Samghabodhi to seize the throne himself.

== Early life ==
Prince Gothabhaya came from the Lambakanna dynasty, he was invited by the previous ruler called King Vijaya Kumara to the palace along with Prince Sangha Tissa and Prince Sangha Bodhi, by hearing a prediction Prince Gothabhaya had been interested on capturing the throne of the kingdom and with the help of his friend Prince Sangha Tissa which at the time of the conspiracy had held the position of commander in chief of the army, together they killed the king.

== Legend ==
According to a legend a blind man had predicted that the three Princes would reign over the kingdom.

== Rebellion against the former king ==
King Sangha Bodhi was famous among the citizens due to his religious works, Prince Gothabhaya at the time held the treasurer position of the kingdom was jealous of the king and decided to capture the throne for himself thus he rebelled during the kings reign and the king decided not to fight against Prince Gothabhaya due to the concern over the wellbeing of the common people, he decided to leave the throne and become a ascetic and stay in the forest.

== Banishing of Mahayana cult ==
During the kings reign the Mahayana monks started spreading their version of Buddhism which was considered contradicting by the Maha viharaya, King Gothabhaya took action and decided to destroy the teachings of the cult and expelled 60 monks which was marked and banished out of Sri Lanka and they settled in India and a person with the name Sanghamitta had joined the cult.

== Legacy ==
Gothabhaya had two sons named Jetthatissa and Mahasena. He entrusted the education of his sons to a South Indian monk named Sanghamitta who had befriended him. This turned out to be a key point in Sri Lankan history since Mahasena, who had embraced the Vaitulya doctrines taught by Sanghamitta, constructed the Jetavana temple which became one of the country's three main schools of Buddhism during the Anuradhapura period despite Gothabhaya's efforts to arrest the spread of Vaitulyavada.

== See also ==
- List of Sri Lankan monarchs
- History of Sri Lanka

Gothabhaya of Anuradhapura King of Sri Lanka
Regnal titles
Preceded by Siri Sangha Bodhi I	King of Anuradhapura; 249–262 AD	Succeeded by Jettha Tissa I
