= Mahasena of Anuradhapura =

Sri Lankan king of Anuradhapura from 277 to 304

Mahasena මහාසේන
- Maharaja; Mapurumuka; Mahasen Abha
- Statue of Mahasena at Kirivehera, Kataragama

King of Anuradhapura
- Reign: 273–301 AD
- Predecessor: Jettha Tissa I
- Successor: Sirimeghavanna
- Died: 301 AD
Names
- Mahasena; Mahasen
- Dynasty: House of Lambakanna I
- Father: Gothabhaya
- Religion: Mahayana Buddhism (initially); Therevada Buddhism (later)

Mahasena, (Sinhala: මහාසේන) also known in some records as Mahasen, was a king of Sri Lanka who reigned from 273 to 301 AD. He initiated the construction of large tanks (reservoirs) in Sri Lanka, ultimately building sixteen of them. Early in his reign, Mahasena discriminated against Theravāda Buddhists and destroyed several of their temples, including the Mahavihara, the principal Theravāda monastery. However, guided by his chief minister, he sought reconciliation by constructing the Jethavana stupa.

== Discrimination against Theravada Buddhism ==
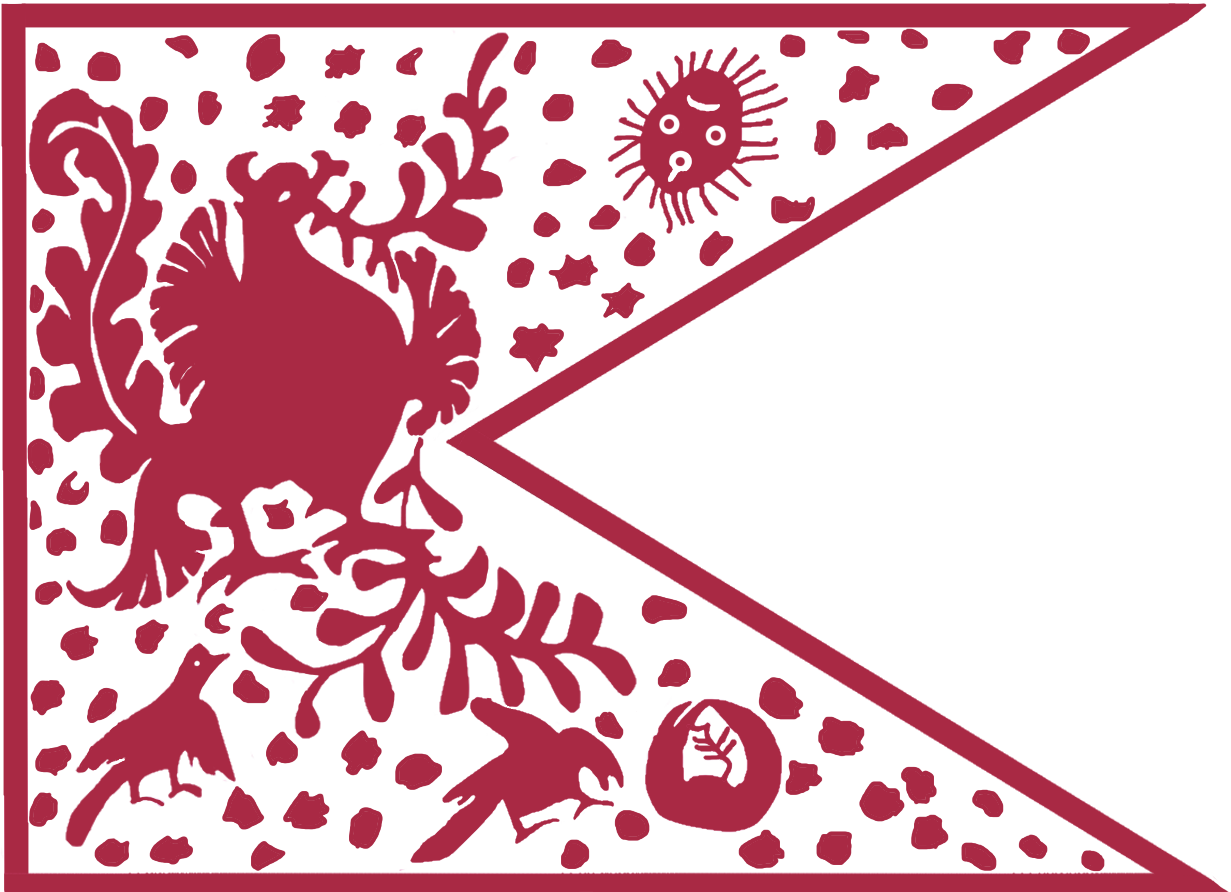
Flag believed to be associated with Mahasena

Mahasena was the younger son of King Gotabhaya, who ruled the country from 253 to 266 CE. His elder brother and predecessor to the throne was King Jetthatissa, who was the king from 266 to 275. Mahasen and Jetthatissa were educated by a Buddhist monk named Sanghamitta, who was a follower of the Vaitulya doctrine. Mahasena also became a follower of this doctrine, which was associated with Mahayana Buddhism. Theravada Buddhism was traditionally the official religion of the country. However, when Mahasena acquired the throne, he ordered the Bhikkhus of Mahavihara, the largest Theravada temple in the country, to accept Mahayana teachings. When they refused, Mahasena prohibited his countrymen from providing food to the Theravada Bhikkhus, and established a fine for violating this. As a result, the Buddhist monks abandoned Anuradhapura and went to the Ruhuna municipality in the South of the country.

Mahasena destroyed the Mahavihara, and the materials obtained from there were used for building the Jethavanaramaya. Lovamahapaya, which belonged to the Mahavihara, was also destroyed. After this incident, the king's chief minister and friend, Meghavannabaya, rebelled and raised an army in Ruhuna against him. The king came with his army to defeat Meghavannabaya and camped opposite the rebel camp. On the night before the battle was to be fought, Meghavannabaya managed to enter Mahasena's camp and convinced him to stop the violence against Theravada Buddhists. Mahasena agreed to stop the violence and made peace with Meghavannabaya, and later reconstructed the Mahavihara.

== Constructions ==
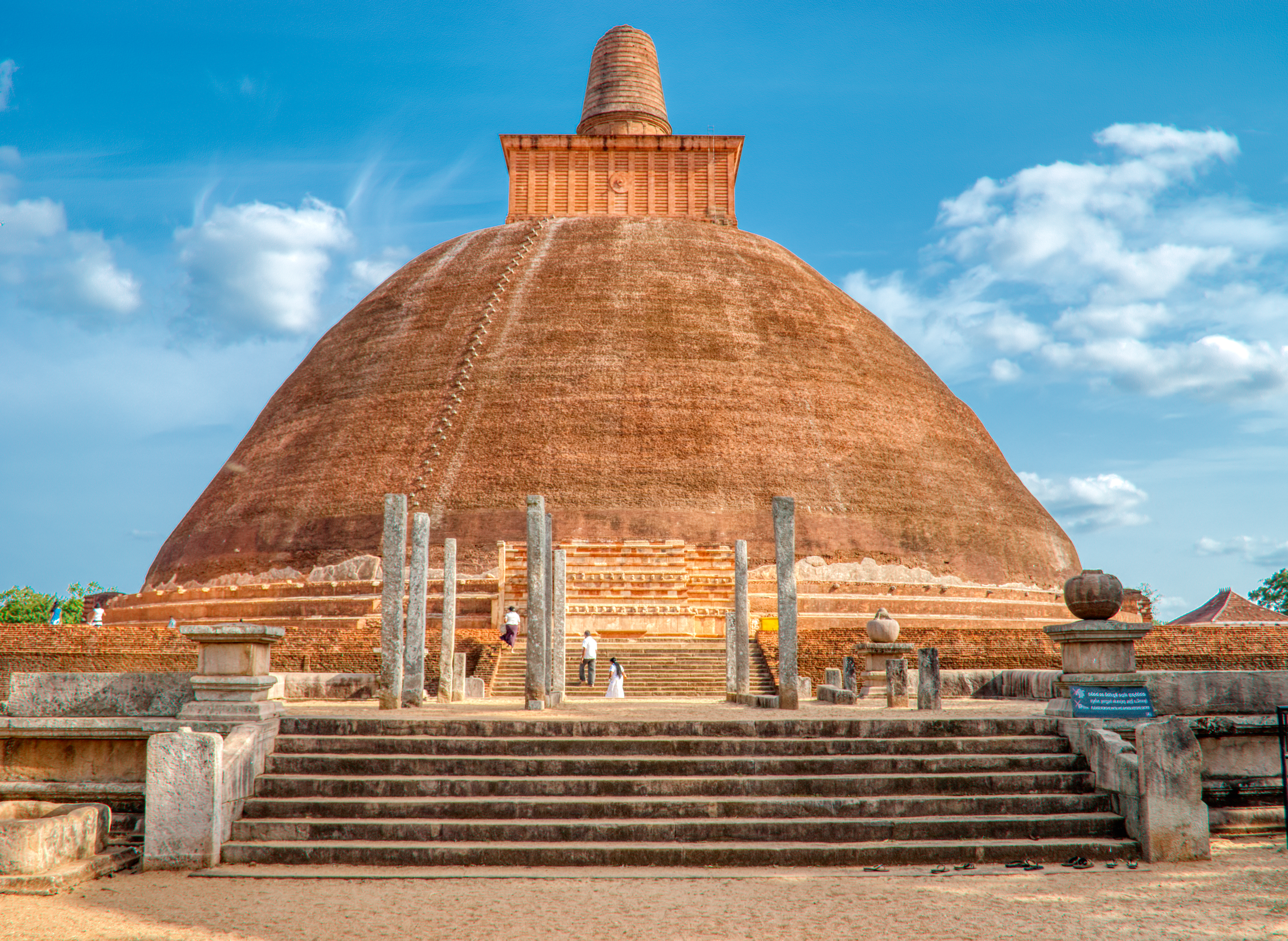
Jetavana stupa

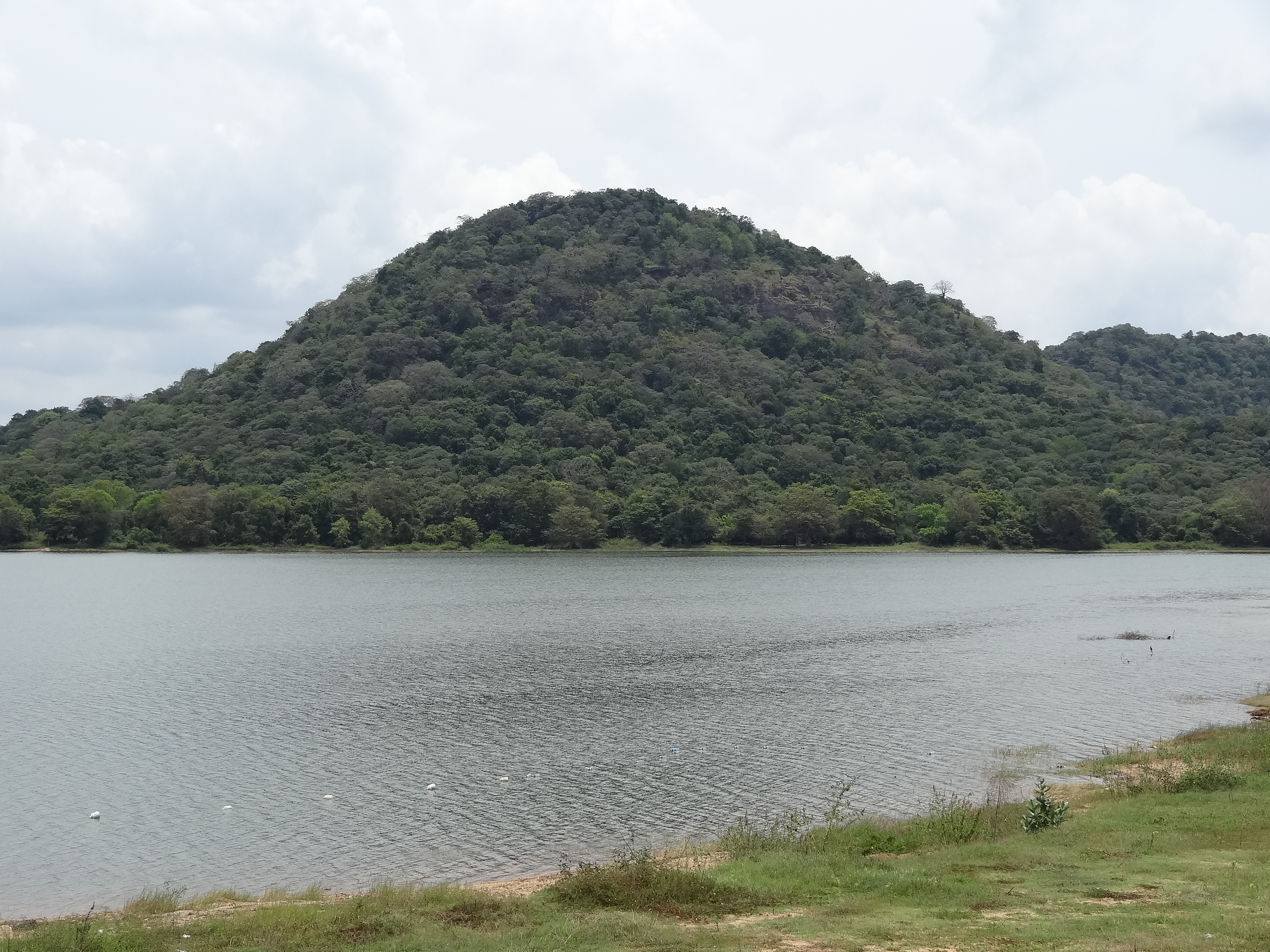
Minneriya Wewa

The Jethavana stupa was built by Mahasena in the land belonging to Mahavihara. This is the highest stupa in Sri Lanka, and is among the tallest in the world. He also built other temples such as Gokanna, Minneriya, and Kalandaka.

The Mahavamsa, the chronicle of Sri Lanka, states that Mahasen constructed sixteen large tanks and two irrigation canals. The largest among these is the Minneriya tank, which covers an area of 4,670 acres (18.9 km^{2}). The tank has a circumference of 21 miles (34 km), and its 44-foot (13 m) high bund is 1.25 miles (2.01 km) long. The Minneriya tank provides water for a large area, and its water supply is maintained by the Elahara canal. Henry Ward, a governor of Sri Lanka when it was a British crown colony, had stated;

No wisdom and no power in the ruler can have forced such efforts even upon the most passive oriental nations, without general persuasion that the work was one of paramount necessity and that all would participate in its benefits

The sixteen tanks given in the Mahavamsa as built by Mahasena are as follows. Some of these tanks have been identified, and the present names of the ones that have been identified are given in brackets.

- Manihira (Minneriya)
- Mahagama
- Challura
- Khanu
- Mahamani
- Kokavata
- Dhammarama
- Kumbalaka
- Vahana
- Ratmalakandaka (Padawiya)
- Tissavadamanaka (Kawudulla)
- Velangavitthi
- Mahagallaka
- Cira
- Mahadaragallaka (Nachchaduwa)
- Kalapasana

In addition to these, Mahasena also built the canal Pabbathantha ela, and also completed the canal Elahara ela, which was started by King Vasabha.

== Relations with the countrymen ==
During Mahasena's anti-Theravada campaign, his countrymen turned against him and this opposition even led to rebellions against him. Even the Commander of his army Meghavarnabaya turned against him. These led to the killing of several royal officials, including the monk Sanghamitta, the teacher of the king who led him to this campaign.

However, after Mahasena reconstructed the Mahavihara and constructed and repaired several tanks in order to improve agriculture in the country, the people's opposition toward him was reduced. After the construction of the Minneriya reservoir, Mahasena was regarded as a god or deity, and was called Minneri Deviyo (God of Minneriya). After his death, a shrine was built for him near the Minneriya reservoir, the remains of which can be seen to this day.

Mahasena died in 301, and with his death, the Mahavamsa written by the Buddhist Monk Mahanama also ends.

== See also ==
- Mahavamsa
- List of Sri Lankan monarchs

Mahasena of Anuradhapura King of Sri Lanka
Regnal titles
Preceded by Jettha Tissa I	King of Anuradhapura; 273–301 AD	Succeeded by Sirimeghavanna
