= Abhay =

Abhay may refer to:

== Films and television ==
- Abhay (1994 film) (English title: The Fearless), an Indian children's film
- Abhay (2001 film) (Tamil title: Aalavandhan), an Indian Hindi action thriller
- Abhay (2009 film), an Indian Kannada romantic action film
- Abhay (TV series), an Indian crime web series

== Places ==
- Abhayagiri Buddhist Monastery
- Abhayagiri Dagaba, an extensive ruins in Anuradhapura, Sri Lanka
- Abhayapuri, a town in Assam

== People ==
- Abhay Ashtekar (born 1949), professor of physics at Pennsylvania State University
- Abhay Bharadwaj (1954–2020), Indian politician
- A. C. Bhaktivedanta Swami Prabhupada or Abhay Charan De (1896–1977), founder of the International Society for Krishna Consciousness
- Abhay Deol (born 1976), Indian actor
- Abhay Kumar (born 1980), diplomat, writer, poet, artist
- Abhay Sopori (born 1979), musician
- Kouprasith Abhay, Laotian general
- Abhay, Indian maoist
- Abhay Verma (born 1998), Indian actor

== Other uses ==
- Abhay IFV, an infantry fighting vehicle developed by DRDO
- INS Abhay ships of the Indian navy
- Abhayamudra, a pose that Hindu gods are often depicted in

== See also ==
- Abhaya (disambiguation)
