= Abhayam =

Abhayam may refer to:

- Abhayam (1970 film), Malayalam film released in 1970 starring Madhu and Sheela
- Abhayam (1991 film), Malayalam film released in 1991 starring Madhu and Parvathy

== See also ==
- Abhaya (disambiguation)
