= Siri Naga I =

King of Anuradhapura from 196 to 215

Siri Naga I පළමුවන සිරි නාග
- King of Anuradhapura
- Reign: 189– 209 AD
- Predecessor: Kuda Naga
- Successor: Voharika Tissa
- Issue: Voharika Tissa; Abhaya Naga
- Dynasty: House of Lambakanna I

Siri Naga I (Sinhala: පළමුවන සිරි නාග), was King of Anuradhapura in the 2nd century, whose reign lasted from 189 to 209 AD. He succeeded his brother-in-law Kuda Naga as King of Anuradhapura and was succeeded by his son Voharika Tissa.

Historical texts state that he renovated Ruwanweliseya and renovated Lowamahapaya into a five storied structure and made stone steps at the entrances to the Sri Maha Bodhi.

== See also ==
- List of Sri Lankan monarchs
- History of Sri Lanka

Siri Naga I House of Lambakanna I Born: ? ? Died: ? ?
Regnal titles
Preceded by Kuda Naga	King of Anuradhapura; 189–209 AD	Succeeded by Voharika Tissa
