= SLNS Gajabahu (1972) =

River-class frigate of the Sri Lanka Navy

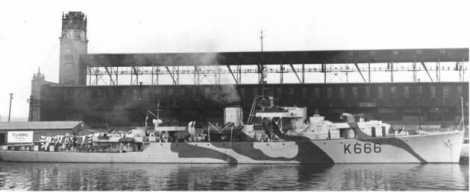
- HMCS Hallowell

History

Canada
- Name: Hallowell
- Namesake: Hallowell, Ontario
- Operator: Royal Canadian Navy
- Ordered: 1 February 1943
- Builder: Canadian Vickers Ltd., Montreal
- Yard number: 178
- Laid down: 22 November 1943
- Launched: 28 March 1944
- Commissioned: 8 August 1944
- Decommissioned: 7 November 1945
- Identification: Pennant number:K666
- Honours and awards: Atlantic, 1944-45.
- Fate: Sold to Uruguayan interests 1946; resold to Palestinian firm, turned into ferry Sharon 1949

Israel
- Name: Miznak
- Namesake: name means "jet branch"
- Acquired: 1952
- Commissioned: 1952
- Fate: Sold to Ceylon, 1958

Ceylon / Sri Lanka
- Name: Gajabahu
- Namesake: King Gajabahu I
- Acquired: 1958
- Commissioned: 1958
- Renamed: SLNS Gajabahu, 1972
- Decommissioned: 1978
- Home port: Naval and Maritime Academy, Trincomalee
- Fate: Cadet officer training & accommodation ship

General characteristics
- Class & type: River-class frigate
- Displacement: 1,445 tons (1,470 tonnes); 2,110 tons full (2,143 tonnes)
- Length: 283 ft (86 m) p/p; 301.25 ft (91.82 m) o/a
- Beam: 36.5 ft (11.1 m)
- Draught: 9 ft (2.7 m) ; 13 ft (4.0 m) full load
- Propulsion: 2 × Admiralty 3-drum boilers, 2 shafts, reciprocating vertical triple expansion, 5,500 ihp (4,100 kW)
- Range: 646 tons oil fuel; 7,500 nmi (13,900 km) at 15-knot (28 km/h)
- Complement: 107
- Armament: 2 × QF 4 in (102 mm) /40 Mk.XIX guns, single mounts CP Mk.XXIII; up to 10 × QF 20 mm Oerlikon A/A on twin mounts Mk.V and single mounts Mk.III, 1 × Hedgehog 24 spigot A/S projector, up to 150 depth charges

SLNS Gajabahu (named after Gajabahu, a former king of Sri Lanka) was a River-class frigate of the Sri Lanka Navy. She has since been converted to a training ship for the Naval & Maritime Academy, Trincomalee. She was originally HMCS Hallowell of the Royal Canadian Navy, built during the Second World War and then saw service as INS Miznak of the Israeli Navy. The Royal Ceylon Navy purchased her in 1958 from Israel.

== Construction and career ==
=== Royal Canadian Navy and Israeli Navy ===
HMCS Hallowell was ordered on 1 February 1943 as part of the 1943-44 River-class building program by the Royal Canadian Navy (RCN). She was laid down by Canadian Vickers Ltd. aT Montreal on 22 November 1943 and launched 28 March 1944. She was commissioned into the RCN on 8 August 1944 at Montreal.

After working up at Bermuda, Hallowell was assigned to the Mid-Ocean Escort Force (MOEF) escort group C-1 as the Senior Officer's Ship. From late November 1944 until June 1945, she was continuously employed as a convoy escort on North Atlantic convoys. In June 1945 she returned to Canada and from July to August transported troops from St. John's to Canada. She was paid off at Sydney, Nova Scotia on 7 November 1945 and placed in reserve at Shelburne, Nova Scotia.

After the war she was sold to Uruguayan interests in 1946 before being re-sold to a Palestinian group in 1949 for conversion to a short-service ferry in the Mediterranean Sea. She was renamed Sharon and remained in service until 1952, when she was purchased by the Israeli Navy, rearmed and commissioned as INS Miznak and given the designation K-32. She remained in service until 1958.

=== Royal Ceylon Navy ===
Purchased from the Israeli Navy in 1958–3 years after another River-class frigate, HMCyS Mahasena—she was commissioned as HMCyS Gajabahu into the Royal Ceylon Navy. She participated in many flag-showing missions in various countries, including a cruise to Japan. Gajabahu also took part in many international naval exercises.

Following the failed military coups d'état in 1962 in which the former Captain of the Navy (as the Commander of the Navy was known then) was implicated, the government undertook a program of downsizing the military. As a result, Gajabahu became the flagship of the fleet and only major warship of the Royal Ceylon Navy after Mahasena and Parakram were sold off and Vijaya was lost in a storm. During the 1971 Insurrection she could not be deployed to sea since her crew were dispatched for ground duty due to personnel shortages. "HMCyS Gajabahu" became "SLNS Gajabahu" when Sri Lanka became a republic in 1972. In the 1980s she was taken out of active service to be converted to a training ship for the Naval and Maritime Academy, Trincomalee.
