= Abhayagiri =

Abhayagiri may refer to:

- Abhayagiri vihāra, a ruined monastic complex of great historical significance in Sri Lanka
- Abhayagiri Buddhist Monastery, a Theravadin Buddhist monastery in Redwood Valley, California

== See also ==
- Abhaya (disambiguation)
- Giri (disambiguation)
