= Subharaja =

1st century king of the Sri Lankan kingdom of Anuradhapura

Subharaja සුභරජ
- King of Anuradhapura
- Reign: 60 – 67 AD
- Predecessor: Yasalalaka
- Successor: Vasabha
- Died: 67 AD
- Religion: Therevada Buddhism

Subharaja (Sinhala: සුභරජ), was King of Anuradhapura during the 1st century. His reign lasted from 60 to 67 AD. He succeeded Yasalalaka as King of Anuradhapura and was overthrown and succeeded by Vasabha, the first king of the Lambakanna dynasty. The end of Subharaja's reign marked the end of the House of Vijaya.

== See also ==
- List of Sri Lankan monarchs
- History of Sri Lanka

Subharaja House of Vijaya Born: ? ? Died: ? ?
Regnal titles
Preceded by Yasalalaka	King of Anuradhapura; 60–67 AD	Succeeded by Vasabha
