= Vankanasika Tissa =

King of Anuradhapura from 111 to 113

Vankanasika Tissa වංකනාසික තිස්ස
- King of Anuradhapura
- Reign: 111–114 AD
- Predecessor: Vasabha
- Successor: Gajabahu I
- Spouse: Consort Mahamatta
- House: Lambakanna dynasty
- Religion: Theravāda Buddhism

Vankanasika Tissa (Sinhala: වංකනාසික තිස්ස, lit. 'crooked-nose Tissa', [ʋaŋkəna:sikə tissə]), also known as Vakunaha Tis (Sinhala: වකුනැහැ තිස්, [ʋakunæɦæ tis]), was the second King of Anuradhapura from the House of Lambakanna I. He ruled from 111 to 114 AD. He was preceded by his father, Vasabha and succeeded by his son, Gajabahu I.

During his reign time, two local rulers were sons of King Vasabha called Dutaga and Uttara ruled the current Tammannava and Monaragala area respectively. This was stated in inscriptions found in Tammannava and Habessa.

During his ruling period, Chola King Karikala Chola invaded the island and took away 12000 Sinhalese men to work as slaves to construct the great Kaveri Dam.

== Constructions ==
He built Mangla Maha Viharaya on Kadigala hill located on the banks of Kala Oya (Gona Nadi). As well as it was said his consort Mahamatta collected money for a vihara to the remembrance of the gratitude for a thero who was done a great help to her.

== Myths of the Queen of Vankanasika Tissa ==
King Subharaja was the father of the Queen. Because he was terrified of a prophecy, he entrusted his daughter to a bricklayer while retaining his royal mantle and insignia. The bricklayer took the princess into his home and raised her as his daughter. When that girl became a maiden, she met a man who was meditating (Nirodha's seventh state) on a flower bed. Then she gives food (alms) and prepares food again to take to her father. When the father inquired about the reason for the delay, the daughter replied that she had given food to a thero. Then, father was overjoyed and instructed her to feed thero every day. One day, while in a trance, he saw this maiden and said, "You are a lucky girl. Remember my assistance when you reach a high point ". Thero died as a result of this. At the time, King Vasabha was looking for a wife for his son, and one day the people who were sent on that duty saw this maiden and gave information about her with auspicious signs. The king then sends people to the village of bricklayers, where the bricklayer reveals his daughter's true identity while presenting the royal mantle and insignia to the king. The king was overjoyed and married his son to this maiden.

Vankanasika Tissa House of Lambakanna I
Regnal titles
Preceded by Vasabha	King of Anuradhapura; 111–114 AD	Succeeded by Gajabahu I
