= Rhascus =

King of Thrace

Rhascus (Ancient Greek: Ῥάσκος) was one of the last Odrysian kings of Thrace, ruling from 18 BC to 11 BC. In the Liberators' civil war (43–42 BC), he supported Mark Antony and Augustus, whereas his brother Rhescuporis supported Marcus Junius Brutus and Gaius Cassius Longinus. Following the triumvirs victory at then Battle of Philippi, Rhascus secured his brother's pardon.

== See also ==
- List of Thracian tribes
