= Mahallaka Naga =

King of Anuradhapura from 135 to 141

Mahallaka Naga මහල්ලක නාග
- King of Anuradhapura
- Reign: 136–143 AD
- Predecessor: Gajabahu I
- Successor: Bhatika Tissa
- Issue: Bhatika Tissa; Kanittha Tissa
- Dynasty: Lambakanna dynasty
- Religion: Theravada Buddhism

Mahallaka Naga (Sinhala: මහල්ලක නාග), was the King of Anuradhapura from the House of Lambakanna I. He ruled from 136 till 143 AD. He was preceded by his son-in-law, Gajabahu I and succeeded by his son, Bhatika Tissa. During his succession to the throne, the king was very old, and thus he was popularly known as Mahallaka Naga or Mahalu Naga.

Mahallaka Naga House of Lambakanna I
Regnal titles
Preceded by Gajabahu I	King of Anuradhapura; 136–143	Succeeded by Bhatika Tissa
