= Kanirajanu Tissa =

King of Anuradhapura from 30 to 33 AD

Kanirajanu Tissa කණිරජානු තිස්ස
- King of Anuradhapura
- Reign: 29 - 32 AD
- Predecessor: Amandagamani Abhaya
- Successor: Chulabhaya
- Died: 32 AD
- Dynasty: House of Vijaya
- Father: Mahadathika Mahanaga
- Religion: Theravāda Buddhism

Kanirajanu Tissa (Sinhala: කණිරජානු තිස්ස), was King of Anuradhapura in the 1st century, whose short reign lasted from 29 to 32 AD. He succeeded his brother Amandagamani Abhaya as King of Anuradhapura and was succeeded by his nephew Chulabhaya. Mahavamsa mentions King Kanirajanu Tissa as an evil king who killed his brother King Amandagamini and ascended the throne.

The Mahavamsa states that this king made a court judgment in the Poya house of the Chethiya Giri Vihara and conspired to kill sixty monks who opposed it, prosecuted them and sentenced them to death by throwing them into a precipice filled with iron spikes called 'kanira'.

It is said that during the reign of this wicked ruler, life of the people in the kingdom itself was deplorable.

== See also ==
- List of Sri Lankan monarchs
- History of Sri Lanka

Kanirajanu Tissa House of Vijaya Born: ? ? Died: ? ?
Regnal titles
Preceded by Amandagamani Abhaya	King of Anuradhapura; 29–32 AD	Succeeded by Chulabhaya
