= Voharika Tissa =

King of Anuradhapura from 215 to 237

Voharika Tissa වෝහාරික තිස්ස
- King of Anuradhapura
- Reign: 209 – 231 AD
- Predecessor: Siri Naga I
- Successor: Abhaya Naga
- Issue: Siri Naga II
- Dynasty: House of Lambakanna I
- Father: Siri Naga I

Voharika Tissa (Sinhala: වෝහාරික තිස්ස), also known as Vira Tissa, or Tissa the Lawgiver was a ruler of Anuradhapura in the 3rd century, whose reign lasted from 209 to 231 AD. He succeeded his father Siri Naga I as King of Anuradhapura and was succeeded by his brother Abhaya Naga.

He made a number of political reforms during his reign and is regarded as a ruler who established and promoted non-violence in the Anuradhapura kingdom. Voharika Tissa also made several attempts to suppress the spreading of the Vaitulya doctrine, a form of Mahayana Buddhism, which arrived at Sri Lanka during his time and spread among the bhikkus of Abhayagiri Vihara.

== See also ==
- List of Sri Lankan monarchs
- History of Sri Lanka

Voharika Tissa House of Lambakanna I Born: ? ? Died: ? ?
Regnal titles
Preceded by Siri Naga I	King of Anuradhapura; 209–231 AD	Succeeded by Abhaya Naga
