= Bhatika Tissa =

King of Anuradhapura from 141 to 165

Bhatika Tissa භාතික තිස්ස
- King of Anuradhapura
- Reign: 143 – 167 AD
- Predecessor: Mahallaka Naga
- Successor: Kanittha Tissa
- Dynasty: House of Lambakanna I
- Father: Mahallaka Naga
- Religion: Theravada Buddhism

Bhatika Tissa (Sinhala: වභාතික තිස්ස), was King of Anuradhapura in the 2nd century, whose reign lasted from 143 to 167 AD. He succeeded his father Mahallaka Naga as King of Anuradhapura and was succeeded by his brother Kanittha Tissa.

== See also ==
- List of Sri Lankan monarchs
- History of Sri Lanka

Bhatika Tissa House of Lambakanna I Born: ? ? Died: ? ?
Regnal titles
Preceded by Mahallaka Naga	King of Anuradhapura; 143–167 AD	Succeeded by Kanittha Tissa
