= Gajabahu I =

King of Anuradhapura from c.113 to c.135

Gajabahu I පළමුවන ගජබාහු
- Maharaja ^{A} ^{B}

King of Anuradhapura
- Reign: c. 113 – c. 135
- Predecessor: Vankanasika Tissa
- Successor: Mahallaka Naga
- Dynasty: Lambakanna dynasty
- Religion: Theravāda Buddhism

Gajabahu I (Sinhala: ගජබාහු, lit. 'Arm of an elephant', [ˈgadʒəba:ɦu]), also known as Gajabahuka Gamani (c. 113 – 135 CE), was a Sinhalese king of Rajarata in Sri Lanka. He is renowned for his military prowess, religious benefactions, extensive involvement in South Indian politics, and for possibly introducing the cult of the goddess Pattini to Sri Lanka. The primary source for his reign is the Mahavamsa, though he is also the only early Sri Lankan king (along with Elara) to be extensively mentioned in the Chera Cilappatikaram (also spelled Silapathikaram).

== Life and Religion ==
Next to nothing is known about Gajabahu's youth, except that he was the son of Vankanasika Tissa (reigned 110–113 CE), king of Rajarata from Anuradhapura, and his consort Mahamatta. As such he might have witnessed the most dramatic event of Tissa's reign, the invasion of Rajarata by the Chola king Karikalan.

The Mahavamsa mentions Gajabahu's accession and reign of twenty-two years and mentions neither Karikalan's invasion nor the military campaigns to south India that Gajabahu became famous for. Instead he is presented as a great patron of religion; the chronicle credits him with the construction of two viharas - Matuvihara and Rumika - and a stupa called Abhayuttara. Matuvihara was built according to the advice of his Queen mother at the thickest of Kadambha river for honoring her. As well as his Queen mother donated money for the plot of land to build a Vihara for the Great Vihara. He is also credited with making a mantle for Dutugemunu's Mirisavetiya, and for building a reservoir to provide the Abhayagiri monastery with food. He also made improvements to the four entrance ways of the Abhayagiri stupa. He also made tank called Gamanitissa for these Vihara. Apart from that he was to build a hall called Mahejasansala in city.

Gajabahu is also credited with the introduction of the cult of the goddess Pattini to Sri Lanka. The Silapathikaram mentions Gajabahu's presence at the consecration of a temple to Kannagi (identified as Pattini in this case) by the Chera king Senguvuttan. Returning from India he brought back not only the alms bowl of the Buddha but Pattini's sacred anklet, and constructed a temple to the goddess 'at a place called Vattapalli near Mullaitivu'. However, there is an alternative view that the cult actually arrived in Sri Lanka in the 13th century, and the legend of Gajabahu's patronage was retrospectively created to generate legitimacy for the goddess.

The annual Perahara held in Kandy is also thought to have its roots in Gajabahu's reign. Following the successful completion of a campaign into Chola territories the temple of Vishnu in Anuradhapura is said to have staged a procession in thanks, which eventually developed into today's festival. Gajabahu was succeeded by his father-in-law Mahallaka Naga.

== Relationship with Southern India ==
However the sources contrast deeply on the actual events of his reign and the reality of the situation remains somewhat obscure. Rajavaliya, the 17th-century chronicle of Sri Lanka describes the events thus:

Taking the giant Nila with him he went and struck the sea with an iron mace,. divided the waters in twain, and going quietly on arrived at the Soli capital, struck terror into the king of Soli, and seated himself on the throne like King Sak; whilst the giant Nila seized the elephants in the city and killed them by striking one against another.

The ministers informed the king of Soli of the devastation of the city thus being made. Thereupon he inquired of Gajaba, "Is the Sinhala host come to destroy this city?" Gajaba replied, " I have a little boy who accompanied me; there is no army," and caused the giant Nila to be brought and made to stand by his side. Thereupon the king of Soli asked, "Why has your Majesty come along without an army?" Gajaba replied, " I have come to take back the 12,000 persons whom your royal father brought here as prisoners in the time of my father." To this the king of Soli saying, "A king of our family it was who, in time past, went to the city of the gods and gained victory in the war with the Asuras," refused to send for and deliver the men. Then Gajaba grew `wroth and said, "Forthwith restore my 12,000 people, giving 12,000 more besides them; else will I destroy this city and reduce it to ashes." Having said this, he squeezed out water from sand and showed it; squeezed water from his iron mace and showed that. Having in this way intimidated the king of Soli he received the original number supplemented by an equal number of men as interest, making 24,000 persons in all. He also took away the jewelled anklets of the goddess Pattini, and the insignia of the gods of the four devala, and also the bowl-relic which had been carried off in the time of king Valagamba; and admonishing the king not to act thus in future, departed.

A detailed analysis of this Rajavaliya account exposes its shaky foundations. It is hard to believe that Gajabahu was completely unaware of an invasion if it had taken place in his father's reign. Nor could one seriously accept his breathtaking display at the court of the Cola king. The Gajabahu story is not a historical episode at all, but a mythic one associated with water cutting (and probably other customs) and incorporated into the two Sinhala chronicles. Thus the reason the earlier Mahavamsa account did not mention the episode is that it simply did not take place historically.

In contrast the mentions of Gajabahu in the Tamil sources represent a much more cordial visit by the Sri Lankan king. The Silapathikaram mentions him twice. On the first occasion he is with the Chera king Senguvuttan, offering sacrifices to the goddess Kannagi in an introductory passage. Later he is in the Chera king's company again, and on very good terms.

It has been suggested that this mention does not necessarily preclude a military campaign; after all it is entirely possible that Gajabahu and Senguvuttan offered joint sacrifices as a way of securing a freshly concluded peace but the Gajabahu story is not a historical episode at all, but a mythic one associated with water cutting (and probably other customs) and incorporated into the two Sinhala chronicles. Thus the reason the earlier Mahavamsa account did not mention the episode is that it simply did not take place historically. On the other hand, the versions presented in the Mahavamsa and Silapathikaram do not mention any violence at all, despite being the major sources for this period. Furthermore, the reliability of the entries in the Silapathikaram has been questioned, and it has been suggested that the meeting between Gajabahu and Senguvttan is the result of a certain amount of 'poetic licence' on the part of the compiler

== Significance ==
Gajabahu is regarded in modern Sri Lanka as an archetype of the mighty Sinhalese monarch, who avenged humiliation by the Cholas and took the sporadically fought wars between Rajarata and Chola to Indian soil. The Sri Lanka Army has an infantry regiment, Gajaba Regiment, named after the warrior king, and the Sri Lanka Navy had named a ship named after the king, the SLNS Gajabahu.

To students of Indian history his reign is important as it provides the 'Gajabahu synchronism' which is used to date many rulers of the ancient Chola and Chera.

== Trade ==
There have been a series of archaeological excavations in recent years at the ancient port Godavaya (= Godawaya, Gothapabbata), situated around a huge rock overlooking the Indian Ocean, close to the gem mining area of the Lower Sitracala Wewa and the inland shipping route of the Walawe Ganga. The archaeologists have found that Godavaya's was an important stop on the maritime Silk Route, in the early centuries of the Common era with excavations and research revealing connections from China to the Red Sea and the Mediterranean. A stone inscription in Brahmi, dating to Gajabahu I's reign, orders that part of the customs collections at the Godavaya Port at Ambalanthota be donated to the nearby Godapawath Temple. There have been three inscriptions and some 75,000 late Roman coins found in earthen vessels in the region.

== See also ==
- Mahavamsa
- List of Sri Lankan monarchs
- History of Sri Lanka
- Cilappatikaram

== Footnotes ==
A.Sinhala: මහරජ, lit. 'Great King', Sinhala pronunciation: [maharadʒə]
B. Should not be confused with the Hindu and Sikh princely title Maharaja.

Gajabahu I King of Sri Lanka
Regnal titles
Preceded by Vankanasika Tissa	Kings of Rajarata; 114–136	Succeeded by Mahallaka Naga
