= Abhaya Indrayan =

Professor and researcher of Biostatistics

Dr. Abhaya Indrayan
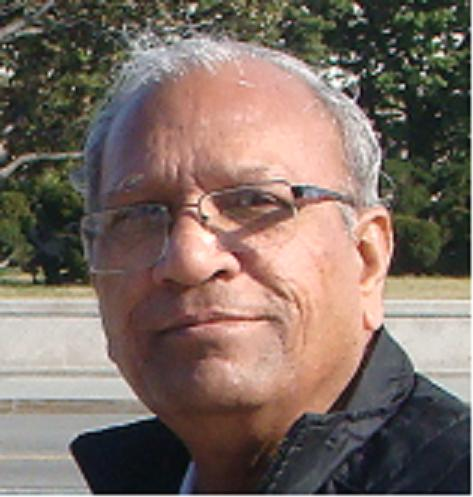
- Born: 11 November 1945 (age 80); Meerut, Uttar Pradesh; India
- Other name: A. Indrayan
- Occupation: Professor
- Known for: His work on medical biostatistics
- Spouse: married
- Children: 2

Abhaya Indrayan (born 11 November 1945) is an Indian professor and researcher of Biostatistics. He had worked with different organizations and universities, including Delhi University College of Medical Sciences and the World Health Organization.

Abhaya resides in Delhi NCR, India after his retirement. He is married and has two children.

== Early life and education ==
Abhaya Indrayan was born on 11 November 1945, in Meerut, India. He was born during the time that India was fighting for its freedom from the British rule. That was the reason why his father, who was a freedom fighter, was jailed repeatedly for long periods.

Abhaya took his early education in Meerut from N.A.S. Inter. College and Meerut College. In 1977, he received his master's degree and Doctoral degree from Ohio State University in Columbus, Ohio, USA.

== Career ==
Abhaya Indrayan was the founding Professor and Head of the Department of Biostatistics and Medical Informatics in Delhi University College of Medical Sciences. In 1995, his department was set up as an independent division, and was upgraded to a full department in 2005.

During his tenure in the college since 1979, he had been the Sports Adviser, Coordinator of Medical Education Unit, Chairman Computer Committee, Convenor Souvenir Committee, Incharge Annual Reports and held several other important assignments. He also taught online courses for the students of Institute of Statistics Education in Arlington County, Virginia.

He has more than 290 publications to his credit, including the books Medical Biostatistics and Concise Encyclopedia of Biostatistics for Medical Professionals. A partial list of his publications appears at the website of Indian Academy of Sciences. Among his other significant works are: smoking index at Collection of Biostatistics Research Archive of Berkeley Electronic Press, which was among the top 5 downloads; and estimates and projections of cardiovascular and diabetes cases in India, which were quoted in the Government of India's official estimates at National Health Profile.

He stayed in the institution until retiring in 2010, wherein he attained the age of 65.

== Achievements ==
Abhaya Indrayan collaborated with the World Health Organization for several projects including National Burden of Disease Studies: a Practical Guide, Teaching Health Statistics, and 11 Health Questions about the 11 SEAR Countries, and served as Temporary Adviser to their Bi-Regional Consultation. He was a technical editor of their biregional report Health in Asia and the Pacific and participated in their debate on Health Systems Performance Assessment. He has completed 32 assignments for the World Health Organization, 3 for the World Bank, 3 for UNAIDS and 2 for Danish Assistance to the National Program for Prevention and Control of Blindness. He has proposed Statistical Medicine as a new emerging medical specialty, proposed biomarkers for quantitatively measuring positive health, and a simple method to measure quantitative agreement.

== Honors and awards ==
- Elected Fellow of the Indian Academy of Sciences (2010).
- Fellow of the Royal Statistical Society. (2002)
- Elected Fellow of the National Academy of Medical Sciences (India) – a rare distinction for a non-medical scientist to be so honoured at that time (1999)
- Elected Fellow of the Indian Society for Medical Statistics (1996)
- WHO Fellow and Visiting Research Scientist at the University of Massachusetts, Amherst, MA (1995)
- Chairman, Silver Jubilee Committee, Indian Society for Medical Statistics (2008–2011)
- President-Elect of the Indian Society for Medical Statistics (2012–2014)
- President, Indian Society for Medical Statistics (2015)

== Bibliography ==
- Indrayan, A. and Malhotra, RK. (2017). Medical Biostatistics (4th ed.). CRC Press. ISBN 978-1-4987-9953-9.
- Indrayan, A. (2017). Basic Methods of Medical Research (4th ed.). AITBS Publishers. ISBN 978-81-7473-335-1.
- Indrayan, A. and Holt, M.P. (2016). Concise Encyclopedia of Biostatistics for Medical Professionals. CRC Press. ISBN 978-1-4822-4387-1.
- Indrayan, A. (2013). Simple Biostatistics for MBBS, PG Entrance and USMLE (4th ed.). Academa Publishers. ISBN 978-81-88511-74-7.
- Indrayan, A. (2006). Biostatistics for Medical, Nursing and Pharmacy Students (1st ed.). PHI Learning. ISBN 978-81-203-3054-2.
- Indrayan, A. (1997). HIV/AIDS Research in India. National AIDS Control Organization.
- Indrayan, A. (1986). Solution Manual for Introduction to Statistical Methods, Volume 1. Rowman & Allanheld.
