= Siri Naga II =

King of Anuradhapura from 245 to 247

Siri Naga II දෙවන සිරි නාග
- King of Anuradhapura
- Reign: 240 - 242 AD
- Predecessor: Abhaya Naga
- Successor: Vijaya Kumara
- Issue: Vijaya Kumara
- Dynasty: House of Lambakanna I
- Father: Voharika Tissa
- Religion: Theravada Buddhism

Siri Naga II (Sinhala: දෙවන සිරි නාග), was King of Anuradhapura in the 3rd century, whose reign lasted from 240 to 242 AD. He succeeded his uncle Abhaya Naga as King of Anuradhapura and was succeeded by his son Vijaya Kumara.

== See also ==
- List of Sri Lankan monarchs
- History of Sri Lanka

Siri Naga II House of Lambakanna I Born: ? ? Died: ? ?
Regnal titles
Preceded by Abhaya Naga	King of Anuradhapura; 240–242 AD	Succeeded by Vijaya Kumara
