= Saiswaroopa Iyer =

Indian author

- Education: Indian Institute of Technology
- Occupation: Writer
- Writing career
- Genre: Mythology
- Notable works: Abhaya: The Legend of Diwali; Avishi: Vishpala of Rig Veda Reimagined; Draupadi: Tale of an Empress; Mauri (Abhaya Collection Book 2)

Saiswaroopa Iyer is an Indian author in the mythological genre of books such as Abhaya, Avishi, Draupadi and Mauri, published via Kindle Direct Publishing. She has an MBA from the Indian Institute of Technology, Kharagpur, and is a former investment professional.

== Abhaya ==
Abhaya: The Legend of Diwali
- Author: Saiswaroopa Pinni
- Cover artist: Anoop Ravindran
- Language: English
- Series: Abhaya collection
- Subject: Krishna, Myth, Fantasy
- Publication date: 2015
- Publication place: India
- Pages: 333

Abhaya is Iyer's first book, and also the first book of the Abhaya collection. The story is about Abhaya, a fictional princess and Dharmasena, her father, Bhauma, lord of Kamarupa and Krishna. The character Abhaya is portrayed as a formidable warrior who defeats the Bhauma.

== Avishi ==
Avishi had been optioned for film or digital adaptation.
