= Siri Sangha Bodhi I =

King of Anuradhapura from 252 to 254

Siri Sangha Bodhi I පළමුවන සිරි සංඝබෝධි
- King of Anuradhapura
- Reign: 247 – 249 AD
- Predecessor: Sangha Tissa I
- Successor: Gothabhaya
- Died: 249 AD
- Dynasty: House of Lambakanna I
- Religion: Theravāda Buddhism

Siri Sangha Bodhi I (Sinhala: පළමුවන සිරි සංඝබෝධි), also known as Siri Sanghabodhi, was a monarch of Anuradhapura in the 3rd century, whose reign lasted from 247 to 249 AD. He succeeded Sangha Tissa I as King of Anuradhapura and was succeeded by Gothabhaya.

== Reign and Death ==
Siri Sanghabodhi's story of devotion to Buddhism is told in the Mahāvaṃsa. The king was said to have been so committed to the Buddha's teachings that he refused to execute criminals. When his prime minister led a rebellion against him, he could not bear the thought of the bloodshed that would result from putting down the rebellion, so he voluntarily abdicated and retired to the forest to live as an ascetic. The prime minister, now King Gothabhaya, fearing the return of the rightful king, offered a reward to anyone who would bring him the head of Siri Sanghabodhi. One day, a poor peasant shared his meal with Siri Sanghabodhi who, having nothing to give him in return, informed the man of his identity and offered him his head, decapitating himself. Siri Sanghabodhi is regarded as a great Buddhist saint in Sri Lanka.

== See also ==
- List of Sri Lankan monarchs
- History of Sri Lanka

Siri Sangha Bodhi I House of Lambakanna I Born: ? ? Died: ? ?
Regnal titles
Preceded by Sangha Tissa I	King of Anuradhapura; 247–249 AD	Succeeded by Gothabhaya
