= Kanittha Tissa =

King of Anuradhapura from 165 to 193

Kanittha Tissa කණිට්ඨතිස්ස
- King of Anuradhapura; Maharaja ^{A} ^{B}
- Reign: 167 – 186 AD
- Predecessor: Bhatika Tissa
- Successor: Cula Naga
- Spouse: Mitabi
- Issue: Cula Naga; Kuda Naga
- Dynasty: House of Lambakanna I
- Father: Mahallaka Naga
- Mother: Sorala
- Religion: Theravada Buddhism

Kanittha Tissa (Sinhala: කණිට්ඨතිස්ස, lit. 'Tissa Junior', [kaɳiʈʈətissə]), also known as Kanitu Tis (Sinhala: කනිටු තිස්, [kaniʈu tis]), was King of Anuradhapura in the 2nd century, whose reign lasted from 167 to 186 AD. He succeeded his brother Bhatika Tissa as King of Anuradhapura and was succeeded by his son Cula Naga.

It is said that Kanittha Tissa established a monastery called Ratna Prasadaya in the Abhayagiri Vihara and built pirivenas in the vicinity of temples scattered throughout the kingdom.

However, despite the efforts he made to uplift Buddhism, no special contribution was given to the agricultural sector of the country.

== See also ==
- List of Sri Lankan monarchs
- History of Sri Lanka

== Notes ==
A.Sinhala: මහරජ, lit. 'Great King', Sinhala pronunciation: [maharadʒə]
B. Should not be confused with the Hindu and Sikh princely title Maharaja.

Kanittha Tissa House of Lambakanna I Born: ? ? Died: ? ?
Regnal titles
Preceded by Bhatika Tissa	King of Anuradhapura; 167–186 AD	Succeeded by Cula Naga
