= Yassalalaka Tissa =

1st century AD king of Anuradhapura in Sri Lanka

Yassalalaka Tissa යසලාලක තිස්ස
- King of Anuradhapura
- Reign: 52 – 60 AD
- Predecessor: Chandamukha
- Successor: Subharaja
- Died: 60 AD
- Dynasty: House of Vijaya
- Father: Ilanaga
- Religion: Theravāda Buddhism

Yassalalaka Tissa (Sinhala: යසලාලක තිස්ස), was King of Anuradhapura in the 1st century, whose reign lasted from 52 to 60 AD. He succeeded his brother Chandmukha and was succeeded by Subharaja. Yassalalaka, who came to the throne after assassinating his brother, is described in history as a playful as well as a vicious ruler, totally unfit for kingship.

== Subharaja and Yassalalaka Tissa ==
Historical chronicles tell a wonderful story about king Yassalalakatissa. During the reign of Yassalalaka, a royal gatekeeper, known as 'Subha' served in his palace. Subha was similar to the king's appearance, and was similar enough to create a disguise. Yassalalaka used to adorn Subha with his royal jewels and let him sit in his throne at times. Yassalalaka then wore the gatekeeper's robes and stood at the entrance, watching the ministers worship the gatekeeper, thinking he was the king.

One day, as usual, during the disguise, the king stood at the gate, and Subha ascended the throne. King Yassalalaka Tissa smiled when he saw the ministers coming and bowing to the king's gatekeeper. Seeing this smile, Subha said to the soldiers:

"Embala, why is this immoral gatekeeper [Yassalalaka] laughing in front of me? Take him away immediately and behead him regardless of the protest."

Then, the king's other active soldiers and ministers took the real king and beheaded him despite his opposition. Thus ended the rule of King Yassalalaka Tissa in Anuradhapura.

== See also ==
- List of Sri Lankan monarchs
- History of Sri Lanka

Yassalalaka Tissa House of Vijaya Born: ? ? Died: ? ?
Regnal titles
Preceded by Chandamukha	King of Anuradhapura; 52–60	Succeeded by Subharaja
