= Jettha Tissa I =

Sri Lankan King of Anuradhapura from 267 to 277

Jettha Tissa I ජෙට්ඨ තිස්ස
- King of Anuradhapura
- Reign: 262 – 273 AD
- Predecessor: Gothabhaya
- Successor: Mahasena
- Died: 273 AD
- Father: Gothabhaya
- Religion: Therevada Buddhism

Jettha Tissa I (Sinhala: ජෙට්ඨ තිස්ස, lit. 'Tissa Senior', [dʒeʈʈə tissə], ruled 262–273) also referred to as Detu Tis (Sinhala: දෙටු තිස්, [deʈu tis]), Kalakandetu Tissa, and Makalan Detu Tissa, was the eldest son of Gothabhaya and brother of Mahasena. He was a king of Sri Lanka for ten years.

The chronicle of Sri Lanka - Mahavamsa described Jettha Tissa I as a cruel person and stated that immediately after his father’s death, he had all of his father’s court ministers killed and then had their bodies placed on spikes around the pyre.

Sources cite that Jettha Tissa and his brother Prince Mahasena were educated by the Buddhist monk Sanghamitta. It is said that the young Jettha Tissa, who later embraced the Maha Vihara priests instead of Buddhism, disliked his teacher. The monk was forced to flee when he became king but returned and became influential during Mahasena's reign.

== Reign ==
Accounts cited that upon the death of Gothabhaya, there were faction among the dignitaries of state who were dissatisfied. Several ministers refused to participate in the funeral rites. In response to the perceived insult, Jettha Tissa forced them to join the procession leading to his father's cremation and had them killed at the end of the ceremony.

During his reign, Jettha Tissa added more storeys to the Lovamahapaya constructed by King Dutugamunu, turning it into a seven storey building. He renovated the stupa in Muthiyangana Raja Maha Viharaya. This building was stripped of its adornments during Mahasena's reign and the materials were transferred to the Abhayagiri Vihara.

Jettha Tissa I House of Lambakanna I
Regnal titles
Preceded by Gothabhaya	King of Anuradhapura; 262-273 AD	Succeeded by Mahasena
