= Kuda Naga =

King of Anuradhapura from 195 to 196

Kuda Naga කුඩා නාග
- King of Anuradhapura
- Reign: 187 – 189 AD
- Predecessor: Cula Naga
- Successor: Siri Naga I
- Died: 189 AD
- Dynasty: House of Lambakanna I
- Father: Kanittha Tissa

Kuda Naga (Sinhala: කුඩා නාග), (a.k.a. Kunchanaga) was King of Anuradhapura in the 2nd century, whose reign lasted from 187 to 189 AD. He succeeded his brother Cula Naga as King of Anuradhapura and was assassinated and succeeded by his brother-in-law, Siri Naga I.

== See also ==
- List of Sri Lankan monarchs
- History of Sri Lanka

Kuda Naga House of Lambakanna I Born: ? ? Died: ? ?
Regnal titles
Preceded by Cula Naga	King of Anuradhapura; 187–189 AD	Succeeded by Siri Naga I
