= Chandamukha =

1st-century King of Anuradhapura

Chandamukha චන්දමුඛ සිව
- King of Anuradhapura
- Reign: 44 – 52 AD
- Predecessor: Ilanaga
- Successor: Yassalalaka Tissa
- Died: 52 AD
- Spouse: Princess Damila Devi
- Dynasty: House of Vijaya
- Father: Ilanaga
- Religion: Theravāda Buddhism

Chandamukha Siva (Sinhala: චන්දමුඛ සිව), (a.k.a. Sandamuhunu) was King of Anuradhapura in the 1st century, whose reign lasted from 43 to 52 AD. He succeeded his father Ilanaga as King of Anuradhapura.

During his period he built a tank near to the village called Manikaragama and gave it to a temple called Issaramanna and his consort Damilidevi was allotted her own revenue from that village to give this temple.

Chandamukha was assassinated by his brother Yasalalaka Tissa at a water festival at Tissa Lake, who succeeded him afterwards.

== See also ==
- List of Sri Lankan monarchs
- History of Sri Lanka

Chandamukha House of Vijaya Born: ? ? Died: ? ?
Regnal titles
Preceded by Ilanaga	King of Anuradhapura; 44–52	Succeeded by Yassalalaka
