= Ilanaga =

1st century AD King of Anuradhapura

Ilanaga ඉළනාග
- King of Anuradhapura
- Reign: 33 - 43 AD
- Predecessor: Interregnum; Sivali
- Successor: Chandamukha
- Died: 43 AD
- Issue: Chandamukha; Yassalalaka
- Dynasty: House of Vijaya
- Religion: Theravāda Buddhism

Ilanaga (Sinhala: ඉළනාග, [iɭəna:gə]), also known as Elunna (Sinhala: එළුන්නා, [eɭunna]), was King of Anuradhapura in the 1st century, whose reign lasted from 33 to 43 AD. He overthrew and succeeded his aunt Sivali as King of Anuradhapura and was succeeded by his son Chandamukha.

== Conflicts with the Lambakarnas ==
Shortly after Ilanaga's coronation, he and his entourage went to Lake Tissa to bathe. The king's servants, who belonged to the Lambakarna dynasty (an ancient clan of Sri Lanka), were very arrogant. They waited until the king went down into the water, and then left the king alone. The king was very angry and tried to break their pride. The Mahavamsa states that he built a dagoba near the Tissa Lake and used Lambakarnas to dig stones and tread clay for it, and deployed Chandalas as their acting officers. Infuriated by this, the Lambakannas revolted against the king and captured him.

The chronicle states that when the queen of King Ilanaga heard of this, she placed her son, prince Chandmukha near the elephant, and said to the king's inaugural elephant in his arms:

"This infant prince is the son of your great king. This prince deserves to die at the hands of you, the king's friend, rather than at the hands of the king's enemies. So trample this prince to death."

Realizing all this, the inaugural elephant immediately entered the palace, broke through the prison where the king had been imprisoned, took the king on his back and ran towards the shore with great speed. After greeting farewell to the elephant, the ships set sail for the Chola country. The Mahavamsa states that the grieving elephant went to the upcountry forest in the middle of the country. King Ilanaga went to the Chola kingdom and stayed there for three years.

Later, King Ilanaga brought an army from the Chola kingdom, landed near Hambantota and gathered an army from Ruhuna. He then invaded Anuradhapura, fought against the treacherous Lambakarna dynasty, defeated them and regained the kingship.

The Mahavamsa states that King Ilanaga brutally avenged his treacherous Lambakarnas and killed them. It is said that he could have killed all the Lambakarna dynasty had it not been for the intervention of King Ilanaga's mother. But they were severely punished and king Ilanaga shattered their dignity.

But nevertheless, the power of the Lambakannas would continue to grow, and prince Vasabha, a member of this clan would eventually end the House of Vijaya in 65 A.D.

== See also ==
- List of Sri Lankan monarchs
- History of Sri Lanka

Ilanaga House of Vijaya Born: ? ? Died: ? ?
Regnal titles
Preceded by Interregnum; Sivali	King of Anuradhapura; 33–43 AD	Succeeded by Chandamukha
