= Kutakanna Tissa =

King of Anuradhapura from 42 to 20 BC

Kutakanna Tissa කුටිකණ්ණ තිස්ස
- King of Anuradhapura
- Reign: 44 BC – 20 BC
- Predecessor: Anula
- Successor: Bhatika Abhaya
- Died: 22 BC
- Issue: Bhatika Abhaya; Mahadathika Mahanaga
- Dynasty: House of Vijaya
- Father: Mahakuli Mahatissa
- Religion: Theravada Buddhism

Kutakanna Tissa (Sinhala: කුටිකණ්ණ තිස්ස), also known as Makalan Tissa, was King of Anuradhapura in the 1st century BC, whose reign lasted from 44 BC to 20 BC. Known as the brother of king Kudatissa, Kutakanna Tissa re-established political stability and peace of the Anuradhapura kingdom by deposing queen Anula, an usurper to the Sinhalese throne. He was succeeded by his son Bhatikabhaya Abhaya.

== See also ==
- List of Sri Lankan monarchs
- History of Sri Lanka

Kutakanna Tissa House of Vijaya Born: ? ? Died: 20 B.C.
Regnal titles
Preceded by Anula	King of Anuradhapura; 44 BC–20 BC	Succeeded by Bhatikabhaya Abhaya
