= Vijaya Kumara =

Vijaya Kumara විජය කුමාර
- King of Anuradhapura
- Reign: 242 – 243 AD
- Predecessor: Siri Naga II
- Successor: Sangha Tissa I
- Died: 243 AD
- Dynasty: House of Lambakanna I
- Father: Siri Naga II

Vijaya Kumara (Sinhala: විජය කුමාර), was King of Anuradhapura in the 3rd century, whose reign lasted for only one year from 242 to 243 AD. He succeeded his father Siri Naga II as King of Anuradhapura and was succeeded by Sangha Tissa I.

== See also ==
- List of Sri Lankan monarchs
- History of Sri Lanka

Vijaya Kumara House of Lambakanna I Born: ? ? Died: ? ?
Regnal titles
Preceded by Siri Naga II	King of Anuradhapura; 242–243 AD	Succeeded by Sangha Tissa I
