= Sivali of Anuradhapura =

Queen of Anuradhapura in Sri Lanka (r. 35 CE)

Sivali සිවලී
- Queen of Anuradhapura
- Reign: 33 - 33 AD
- Predecessor: Chulabhaya
- Successor: Interregnum; Ilanaga
- Dynasty: House of Vijaya
- Father: Amandagamani Abhaya
- Religion: Theravāda Buddhism

Sivali (Sinhala: සිවලී), was Queen of Anuradhapura in the 1st century, who reigned during the year 33 CE after the death of her brother Chulabhaya. When she enthroned she was an unmarried girl but had ability to keep that position steadily. But she was only able to rule Anuradhapura for four months until she was overthrown by king Amandagamini's nephew, Ilanaga.

== See also ==
- List of Sri Lankan monarchs
- History of Sri Lanka

Sivali of Anuradhapura House of Vijaya Born: ? ? Died: ? ?
Regnal titles
Preceded by Chulabhaya	Queen of Anuradhapura; 33 AD	Succeeded by Interregnum; Ilanaga
