= Amandagamani Abhaya =

1st century King of Anuradhapura (r.21-30)

Amandagamani Abhaya අමණ්ඩ-ගාමනී අභය
- King of Anuradhapura
- Reign: 19 - 29 AD
- Predecessor: Mahadathika Mahanaga
- Successor: Kanirajanu Tissa
- Died: 29 AD
- Issue: Chulabhaya; Sivali
- Dynasty: House of Vijaya
- Father: Mahadathika Mahanaga
- Religion: Theravāda Buddhism

Amandagamani Abhaya (Sinhala: අමණ්ඩ-ගාමනී අභය), also referred as Aḍagamunu, was King of Anuradhapura in the 1st century, whose reign lasted from 19 A.D to 29 A.D. He succeeded his father Mahadathika Mahanaga as King of Anuradhapura and was succeeded by his brother Kanirajanu Tissa. He is recorded in historical chronicles as a great patron of Buddhism.

Enacting of the state law known as 'Maghatha' can be termed as a noble deed done by him. It banned all animal slaughter in the country. It is said that Amandagamini built a temple known as 'Ridi Viharaya' near the Kurunegala area and renovated many other temples.

Amandagamini used to offer baskets of sweet fruits to the Sangha. Therefore, historical chronicles state that the word 'Āmanḍa' was also added to his original name, 'Gamini Abhaya' during his reign.

== See also ==
- List of Sri Lankan monarchs
- History of Sri Lanka

Amandagamani Abhaya House of Vijaya Born: ? ? Died: 30
Regnal titles
Preceded by Mahadathika Mahanaga	King of Anuradhapura; 19–29 AD	Succeeded by Kanirajanu Tissa
