= Cula Naga =

King of Anuradhapura from 193 to 195

Cula Naga චූල නාග
- King of Anuradhapura
- Reign: 186 – 187 AD
- Predecessor: Kanittha Tissa
- Successor: Kuda Naga
- Dynasty: House of Lambakanna I
- Father: Kanittha Tissa

Cula Naga (Sinhala: චූල නාග), Khujjanaga, Bujjanaga or also known as Kuhun Na, was King of Anuradhapura in the second century and the successor of Kanittha Tissa. He reigned from 186—187 AD, ruling for only two years until he was overthrown and assassinated by his brother, Kudda Naga.

== See also ==
- List of Sri Lankan monarchs
- History of Sri Lanka

Cula Naga House of Lambakanna I Born: ? ? Died: ? ?
Regnal titles
Preceded by Kanittha Tissa	King of Anuradhapura; 186–187 AD	Succeeded by Kuda Naga
