= Mahadathika Mahanaga =

Early 1st century CE King of Anuradhapura

Mahadathika Mahanaga මහාදාඨික මහානාග
- King of Anuradhapura
- Reign: 7 – 19 AD
- Predecessor: Bhatika Abhaya
- Successor: Amandagamani Abhaya
- Died: 19 AD
- Issue: Amandagamani Abhaya; Kanirajanu Tissa
- Dynasty: House of Vijaya
- Religion: Theravāda Buddhism

Mahadathika Mahanaga (Sinhala: මහාදාඨික මහානාග), also known as Mahadatikanaga was the King of Anuradhapura in the 1st century CE. His reign lasted from 7 CE to 19 CE. He succeeded his brother, Bhatikabhaya Abhaya as King of Anuradhapura and was succeeded by his son, Amandagamani Abhaya.

== See also ==
- List of Sri Lankan monarchs
- History of Sri Lanka

Mahadathika Mahanaga House of Vijaya Born: ? ? Died: ? ?
Regnal titles
Preceded by Bhatikabhaya Abhaya	King of Anuradhapura; 7–19 AD	Succeeded by Amandagamani Abhaya
