= Vatuka of Anuradhapura =

Vatuka වටුක
- King of Anuradhapura
- Reign: 48 BC
- Predecessor: Siva I
- Successor: Darubhatika Tissa
- Dynasty: House of Vijaya

Vatuka (Sinhala: වටුක), was King of Anuradhapura in the 1st century BC, who ruled in the year 48 BC. He succeeded Siva I as King of Anuradhapura. Vatuka was succeeded by Darubhatika Tissa after being poisoned by Anula after a period of one year and two months of ruling.

== See also ==
- List of Sri Lankan monarchs
- History of Sri Lanka

Vatuka of Anuradhapura House of Vijaya Born: ? ? Died: ? ?
Regnal titles
Preceded by Siva I	King of Anuradhapura; 48 BC	Succeeded by Darubhatika Tissa
