= Chulabhaya =

1st century AD King of Anuradhapura in Sri Lanka

Chulabhaya චූලාභය
- King of Anuradhapura
- Reign: 32 - 33 AD
- Predecessor: Kanirajanu Tissa
- Successor: Sivali
- Died: 33 AD
- Dynasty: House of Vijaya
- Father: Amandagamani Abhaya
- Religion: Theravāda Buddhism

Chulabhaya (Sinhala: චූලාභය), was the son of king Amandagamini Abhaya and the ruler of Anuradhapura in the 1st century. He reigned for a short period of time from 32 — 33 AD. He succeeded his uncle Kanirajanu Tissa as King of Anuradhapura and was succeeded by his sister Sivali.

== See also ==
- List of Sri Lankan monarchs
- History of Sri Lanka

Chulabhaya House of Vijaya Born: ? ? Died: ? ?
Regnal titles
Preceded by Kanirajanu Tissa	King of Anuradhapura; 32–33 AD	Succeeded by Sivali
