= Sangha Tissa I =

King of Anuradhapura from 248 to 252

Sangha Tissa I පළමුවන සංඝ තිස්ස
- King of Anuradhapura
- Reign: 243 – 247 AD
- Predecessor: Vijaya Kumara
- Successor: Siri Sangha Bodhi I
- Died: 247 AD
- Dynasty: House of Lambakanna I
- Religion: Theravada Buddhism

Sangha Tissa I (Sinhala: පළමුවන සංඝ තිස්ස), was King of Anuradhapura in the 3rd century, whose reign lasted from 243 to 247 AD. He succeeded Vijaya Kumara as King of Anuradhapura and was succeeded by Siri Sangha Bodhi I.

== See also ==
- List of Sri Lankan monarchs
- History of Sri Lanka

Sangha Tissa I House of Lambakanna I Born: ? ? Died: ? ?
Regnal titles
Preceded by Vijaya Kumara	King of Anuradhapura; 243–247 AD	Succeeded by Siri Sangha Bodhi I
