= Vasabha =

King of Anuradhapura from 67 to 111

Vasabha වසභ
- Maharaja ^{(note 1)}

King of Anuradhapura
- Reign: 67–111 AD
- Predecessor: Subharaja
- Successor: Vankanasika Tissa
- Died: 111 AD
- Spouse: Pottha and/or Jita (Citrā)
- Issue: King Vankanasika Tissa (King) Uttara ^{(note 2)} (King) Duṭaga ^{(note 2)}
- House: Lambakanna dynasty
- Religion: Theravāda Buddhism

Vasabha (Sinhala: වසභ) was a monarch of the Anuradhapura period of Sri Lanka. He is considered to be the pioneer of the construction of large-scale irrigation works and underground waterways in Sri Lanka to support paddy cultivation. 11 reservoirs and 12 canals were constructed during his reign. He also constructed several Buddhist temples in addition to renovating already existing ones. Vasabha started a new dynasty in the history of Sri Lankan monarchs, having seized the throne after killing Subharaja, the then ruler of Anuradhapura.

== Early life and kingship ==
Prince Vasabha, born to a family of a clan named Lambakanna, spent his childhood in a village in the North of the country working for his uncle who was a general in the king's army. The ruler of the country at this time was Subharaja, who was informed by soothsayers that one named Vasabha would defeat him and become king. To avoid this, Subharaja ordered everyone in the country bearing that name to be killed. Vasabha's uncle tried to take him to the king under the pretext of taking him to join the king's service. However, he was saved by Pottha, the wife of his uncle, who purposely put no lime and chalk with the Betel leaves that he gave him, and when the guards escorting him to the king told him to bring it, she told him about the king's decision. He went into hiding following this event and gathered an army in secret.

Having eventually raised an army, Vasabha led a rebellion against the king, and subsequently seized the throne in 67 AD after killing Subharaja and his uncle. To thank his aunt, king Vasabha married her, as they were about the same age. He ruled for 44 years, until his death in 111 AD. His accession to the throne marked the beginning of a new dynasty of rulers, known as the First Lambakanna Dynasty after the name of his clan.

== Services ==
The ancient chronicle Mahavamsa states that he constructed eleven reservoirs and twelve canals to distribute water. His most notable construction is the Elahara canal or Aalisara canal, which originally had a length of about 30 miles (48 km). It was created by damming the Amban river, and was used to divert water in a westerly direction for agricultural use. The reservoirs at Mahavilachchiya and Nochchipotana, which have both been identified as constructions of Vasabha, have a circumference of about 2 miles (3.2 km). Through these projects, Vasabha became a pioneer in the construction of large-scale irrigation works in the country.

Upon learning from a soothsayer that he had only twelve years left to live, Vasabha became a devout Buddhist and performed many meritorious acts in an effort to extend his life. He constructed several Buddhist temples, and renovated others. Among his constructions are the vatadage at Thuparama and some additions to the Mahavihara.

== Inscriptions ==
Inscriptions from the reign of King Vasabha, such as the Vallipuram Gold Plate in the Jaffna Peninsula, mention the appointment of a minister named Isigiraya to ‘Nakadiva,’ which corresponds to present-day Jaffna. Additional inscriptions found at Situlpawwa and Tissamaharama in the south, Batticaloa in the east, and Kurunegala in the west demonstrate that King Vasabha's authority extended across the entire island.

== See also ==
- List of Sri Lankan monarchs

== Notes ==
1.Sinhala: මහරජ, lit. 'Great King', [maharadʒə]; Should not be confused with the Hindu and Sikh princely title "Maharaja".
2.Not mentioned in the Mahavamsa list of Kings. According to some historians the name 'Duṭaga' refers to Vankanasika Tissa. See, Neth FM - Unlimited History - Episode 59 - 03 Video on YouTube

Vasabha Born: ? ? Died: ? 111 AD
Regnal titles
Preceded by Subharaja	King of Anuradhapura; 67–111 AD	Succeeded by Vankanasika Tissa
