= Kuda Tissa =

King of Anuradhapura from 50 to 47 BC

Kuda Tissa කුඩා තිස්ස
- King of Anuradhapura
- Reign: 51 BC – 48 BC
- Predecessor: Chora Naga
- Successor: Siva I
- Died: 48 BC
- Consort: Anula
- House: House of Vijaya
- Father: Mahakuli Mahatissa

Kuda Tissa (Sinhala: කුඩා තිස්ස), was a king of Anuradhapura, the first established kingdom in ancient Sri Lanka. He ruled in the 1st century BC, between 51 BC to 48 BC. He succeeded his uncle Chora Naga as King of Anuradhapura and was succeeded by Siva I after being poisoned by his own mother.

== See also ==
- List of Sri Lankan monarchs
- History of Sri Lanka

Kuda Tissa House of Vijaya Born: ? ? Died: ? ?
Regnal titles
Preceded by Chora Naga	King of Anuradhapura; 51 BC–48 BC	Succeeded by Siva I
