= Siva I =

Siva I සිව
- King of Anuradhapura
- Reign: 48 BC
- Predecessor: Kuda Tissa
- Successor: Vatuka
- Dynasty: House of Vijaya

Siva I (Sinhala: සිව), was King of Anuradhapura in the 1st century BC, who ruled in the year 48 BC. He succeeded Kuda Tissa as King of Anuradhapura and was succeeded by Vatuka.

== Claim to the throne ==
The Mahavamsa states that queen Anula, Kudatissa's queen consort, fell in love with Siva, who was then a royal palace guard, and poisoned Kuda Tissa to let Siva claim the throne of Anuradhapura. Siva himself was later poisoned by Anula after she grew tired of him after a reign of one year and two months.

== See also ==
- List of Sri Lankan monarchs
- History of Sri Lanka
- Anuradhapura period

Siva I House of Vijaya Born: ? ? Died: ? ?
Regnal titles
Preceded by Kuda Tissa	King of Anuradhapura; 48 BC	Succeeded by Vatuka
