= Chora Naga =

King of Anuradhapura from 62 BC to 50 BC

Chora Naga චෝර නාග
- King of Anuradhapura
- Reign: 63 BC – 51 BC
- Predecessor: Mahakuli Mahatissa
- Successor: Kuda Tissa
- Died: 51 BC
- Consort: Anula
- House: House of Vijaya
- Father: Valagamba
- Religion: Therevada Buddhism

Chora Naga (Sinhala: චෝර නාග), also known as Coranaga or Mahanaga, was King of Anuradhapura in the 1st century BC, who ruled from 63 BC to 51 BC. He succeeded his cousin Mahakuli Mahatissa as King of Anuradhapura and was succeeded by Kuda Tissa. King Chora Naga was not a follower of the Mahavihara sect. He had even demolished 18 temples that belong to Mahavihara. As a result, the author of the Mahāvaṃsa referred to him as a thief.

== Death ==
The Mahavamsa states that King Chora Naga was poisoned and killed by Anula of Anuradhapura, his queen consort, who fell in love with a royal guard in the palace called Siva and let him become the ruler of the country. However, there is also a possibility that the people of Anuradhapura, who were frustrated at Chora Naga's mischief, assassinated him.

== See also ==
- List of Sri Lankan monarchs
- History of Sri Lanka

Chora Naga House of Vijaya Born: ? ? Died: ? ?
Regnal titles
Preceded by Mahakuli Mahatissa	King of Anuradhapura; 63 BC–51 BC	Succeeded by Kuda Tissa
