= Bhatika Abhaya =

King of Anuradhapura

Bhatika Abhaya භාතික අභය
- Maharaja; Devanapiya; Lappakarāja (Admirable King)
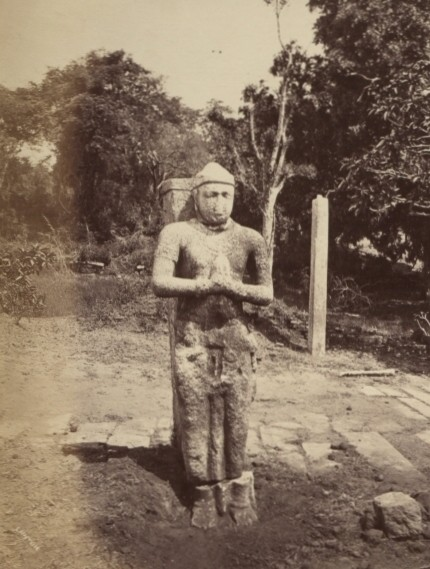
- An 8 feet high stone statue of Bhatikabhaya Abhaya facing the Ruwanwelisaya

King of Anuradhapura
- Reign: 20 BC – 7 AD
- Predecessor: Kutakanna Tissa
- Successor: Mahadathika Mahanaga
- Died: 7 AD
- Consort: Samadevi
- Issue: Unnamed son
Names
- Bhatika; Bathiya; Bhatikathissa; Abhaya
- Dynasty: House of Vijaya
- Father: Kutakanna Tissa
- Mother: Anula Devi (as per inscriptions-different from Queen Anula)
- Religion: Theravāda Buddhism

Bhatika Abhaya or also known as Bhatikatissa (Sinhala: භාතික අභය, භාතිකතිස්ස) was the King of Anuradhapura in the 1st century BC, whose reign lasted from 20 BC to 7 AD. He succeeded his father Kutakanna Tissa as King of Anuradhapura and was succeeded by his brother Mahadathika Mahanaga.

It is recorded that the king coated the Ruvanweliseya in pearls and had it scented with flowers and honeycombs yearly. It is also recorded that the king was generous towards the Viharaya’s across Sri Lanka gifting clothes and giving daily alms.

His reign of 29 years is recorded in Sri Lankan history as a very peaceful and prosperous time in the Anuradhapura kingdom. (Note: During his period no known conflicts took place.) During his period of rule the king stopped collecting taxes.

== Relations with Rome ==
It is mentioned in historical texts that King Bhathikabhaya imported valuable items, including beads, gold vessels, which were used in the Maha Seya’s ritual from the Roman province of Parasumudra or the country Romanukha (Roman Empire).

A freedman of Annius Plocamus had mistakenly sailed on to the territory of Anuradhapura kingdom and had the opportunity to meet the king of Anuradhapura kingdom, the collection of Roman coins caught the interest of the king on the western civilization and with the freedman a Sinhalese person was taken back to the mainland of the Roman Empire, it is said that he had become a diplomat for the Roman Empire.

== Works by the king ==
Name	Date of construction	Description
Cittupathana pasada	20 BC - 9 AD	Palace/Mansion used by the king to give regular alms to monks.
Maniupatthana pasada	20 BC - 9 AD	Palace/Mansion used by the king to give regular alms to monks.
Mucalupatthana	20 BC - 9 AD	Palace/Mansion used by the king to give regular alms to monks.
Paduma	20 BC - 9 AD	Palace/Mansion used by the king to give regular alms to monks.
Chattapasada	20 BC - 9 AD	Palace/Mansion used by the king to give regular alms to monks.
Uposatha building	20 BC - 9 AD	Constructed near Thuparama.

== See also ==
- List of Sri Lankan monarchs
- History of Sri Lanka

== Notes ==
Bhatika Abhaya House of Vijaya Born: ? ? Died: ? ?
Regnal titles
Preceded by Kutakanna Tissa	King of Anuradhapura; 20 BC–7 AD	Succeeded by Mahadathika Mahanaga
