= Abhaya Naga =

King of Anuradhapura from 237 to 244

Abhaya Naga අභය නාග
- King of Anuradhapura
- Reign: 231–240 AD
- Predecessor: Voharika Tissa
- Successor: Siri Naga II
- Dynasty: House of Lambakanna I
- Religion: Theravada Buddhism

Abhaya Naga (Sinhala: අභය නාග), was King of Anuradhapura in the 3rd century, whose reign lasted from 231 to 240 AD. He succeeded his brother Voharika Tissa as King of Anuradhapura, seizing the throne with assistance from a Tamil army. He was succeeded by his nephew Siri Naga II.

== See also ==
- List of Sri Lankan monarchs
- History of Sri Lanka

Abhaya Naga House of Lambakanna I Born: ? ? Died: ? ?
Regnal titles
Preceded by Voharika Tissa	King of Anuradhapura; 231–240 AD	Succeeded by Siri Naga II
