= Darubhatika Tissa =

Darubhatika Tissa දාරුභාතික තිස්ස
- King of Anuradhapura
- Reign: 48 BC
- Predecessor: Vatuka
- Successor: Niliya
- Dynasty: House of Vijaya

Darubhatika Tissa (Sinhala: දාරුභාතික තිස්ස), was King of Anuradhapura in the 1st century BC, whose reign lasted the year 48 BC. He succeeded Vatuka as King of Anuradhapura and was succeeded by Niliya.

== See also ==
- List of Sri Lankan monarchs
- History of Sri Lanka

Darubhatika Tissa House of Vijaya Born: ? ? Died: ? ?
Regnal titles
Preceded by Vatuka	King of Anuradhapura; 48 BC	Succeeded by Niliya
