= Niliya of Anuradhapura =

Niliya නිලිය
- King of Anuradhapura
- Reign: 48 BC
- Predecessor: Darubhatika Tissa
- Successor: Anula
- Dynasty: House of Vijaya

Niliya (Sinhala: නිලිය), was King of Anuradhapura in the 1st century BC, whose reign lasted the year 48 BC. He succeeded Darubhatika Tissa as King of Anuradhapura and was succeeded by Anula.

== See also ==
- List of Sri Lankan monarchs
- History of Sri Lanka

Niliya of Anuradhapura House of Vijaya Born: ? ? Died: ? ?
Regnal titles
Preceded by Darubhatika Tissa	King of Anuradhapura; 48 BC	Succeeded by Anula
