= Mahakuli Mahatissa =

Mahakuli Mahatissa මහකුලි මහාතිස්ස
- King of Anuradhapura
- Reign: 77 BC – 63 BC
- Predecessor: Valagamba
- Successor: Chora Naga
- Died: 63 BC
- Issue: Kuda Tissa; Kutakanna Tissa
- Dynasty: House of Vijaya
- Father: Khallata Naga
- Religion: Theravāda Buddhism

Mahakuli Mahatissa (Sinhala: මහකුලි මහාතිස්ස), also known as Maha Cula Maha Tissa, was King of Anuradhapura in the 1st century BC. He ruled from 77 BC to 63 BC, succeeding his uncle, Valagamba, as King of Anuradhapura and was succeeded by his cousin Chora Naga.

He was not biologically related to Valagamba, and was instead adopted.

== See also ==
- List of Sri Lankan monarchs
- History of Sri Lanka

Mahakuli Mahatissa House of Vijaya Born: ? ? Died: ? ?
Regnal titles
Preceded by Valagamba	King of Anuradhapura; 77 BC–63 BC	Succeeded by Chora Naga
