= Anula of Anuradhapura =

Anula අනුලා
- Queen of Anuradhapura
- Reign: 48 BC – 44 BC
- Predecessor: Niliya
- Successor: Kutakanna Tissa
- Born: Kingdom of Anuradhapura
- Died: 44 BC; Kingdom of Anuradhapura
- Consort: Chora Naga; Kuda Tissa
- Religion: Buddhism

Queen Anula of Anuradhapura (Sinhala: අනුලා), was the first queen regnant in Sri Lankan history (48 BC – 44 BC). Anula initially rose to power as a consort of King Chora Naga (also known as Coranaga and Mahanaga), son of King Valagambahu of Anuradhapura. However, in her five-year reign, she poisoned her way through at least four other husbands and consorts, causing her to govern Rajarata on her own eventually.

Queen Anula of Anuradhapura differs from another famous figure in Sri Lankan history, also named Anula. She is a different figure as she is King Devanampiyatissa's sister-in-law, the first woman in Sri Lanka to be ordained as a bikkhuni. The primary source for Anula's reign is the Mahavamsa, chapters 34 and 35.

== Life ==
Queen Anula is known to have lived during the 1st century BC. During this era, Sri Lanka was in an unstable state as it was at war. Many betrayals and strife occurred due to this circumstance, causing many rulers to be overthrown. It is also clear that people were hungry for power – they did anything they could to obtain significant control over the place.

Sri Lanka was also governed by the Kingdom of Anuradhapura, which was established around the 4th century BC until the 10th century AD. Anuradhapura was the capital of the kingdom, which was a city located in North Central Province in Sri Lanka. This capital was located approximately 127 miles north of Colombo, which is the island's current capital. The city is now known as the UNESCO World Heritage Site.

In the 1st century BC, the Anuradhapura Kingdom was administered by an individual named Chora Naga, who is a progeny of Vijaya, which was known as Mahanaga. According to the Mahavamsa, Chora Naga, the son of Vattagamani Abhaya, was perceived as a dissident figure during the time by which his father's successor – Mahakuli – ruled. When Mahaculi Mahatissa died, Coranaga took over his position and became the new King of Anuradhapura. He was known to have ruled the kingdom for approximately 12 years.

Chora Naga destroyed “eighteen viharas (Buddhist monasteries),” as stated by the Mahavamsa, in a time by which he couldn't find refuge or protection during the rebellion era. The Mahavamsa claims he is a “fool” because of this occurrence.

=== Reign ===
After ruling the kingdom for 12 years, Chora Naga died after the ingestion of poisoned food given to him by his consort, known as "the infamous Anula". The reason why Anula murders her husband is unclear. However, it is known that during her marriage with Chora Naga, she was intrigued by the palace guard named Kuda Tissa, the son of Mahakuli Mahatissa.

Because of the power that Queen Anula held, marrying Kuda Tissa brought him to power, making him the new King of Anuradhapura.

The name Kuda also means little. Therefore, it is possible that the new king was only a child and, effectively, under Anula's control. It is also possible that he was referred to as kuda because his father was Maha (in this context meaning "senior") Tissa. He ruled for around three years before his death.

The Mahavamsa mentions, “And for love of this same palace-guard Anula now killed Tissa also by poison and gave the government into the hands of that other.” This indicates that Anula was attracted to a different palace guard named Sivia, who gained power and became the new king. The cycle repeats as Sivia is also then murdered through poison by Anula after only about a year and two months of ruling the kingdom.

Queen Anula is known to marry people from the lower class, such as a carpenter named Vatuka, a wood carrier, known as Darubathika Tissa, and one from the higher class, which was a palace priest named Niliya. With all these husbands, she would poison them to gain power herself eventually and rule the Kingdom of Anuradhapura.

This was stated in The Mahavamsa as it says: “When the princess Anula (who desired to take her pleasure even as she listed with thirty-two of the palace-guards) had put to death Niliya also with poison, the queen ANULA herself, reigned four months.”

=== Deposition and death ===
Her power over the kingdom was cut short as Kutakanna Tissa, the second son of Mahaculi, arrived back in Anuradhapura after fleeing the place due to fear of Anula. During his time when he was fleeing the kingdom, Kutakanna formed an alliance with many individuals, producing an army to fight Queen Anula. He then “burned the licentious Anula in the palace” (Mahavamsa) on a funeral pyre after his army found her in the palace.

Kutakanna Tissa then became the new ruler of Anuradhapura and governed the kingdom for 32 years.

== See also ==
- List of Sri Lankan monarchs
- History of Sri Lanka

Anula of Anuradhapura Anuradhapura monarchs
Regnal titles
Preceded by Niliya	Queen of Anuradhapura; 48 BC – 44 BC	Succeeded by Kutakanna Tissa
