= List of Sinhalese monarchs by length of reign =

This is the List of Sri Lankan monarchs by reign, sorted chronologically and by length of reign.

#	#	Name	Kingdom	House	Reign		Duration	
#	#	Name	Kingdom	House	From	To	Days	Y-M-D
1	1	Vijaya	Tambapanni	Vijaya	543 BC	505 BC	13,870	38 Years
2	2	Upatissa	Upatissanuwara	Vijaya	505 BC	504 BC	365	1 Year
3	3	Panduvasudeva	Upatissanuwara	Vijaya	504 BC	474 BC	10,950	30 Years
4	4	Abhaya	Upatissanuwara	Vijaya	474 BC	454 BC	7,300	20 Years
5		Tissa (regent)	Upatissanuwara	Vijaya	454 BC	437 BC	6,205	17 Years
6	5	Pandukabhaya	Anuradhapura	Vijaya	437 BC	367 BC	25,550	70 Years
7	6	Mutasiva	Anuradhapura	Vijaya	367 BC	307 BC	21,900	60 Years
8	7	Devanampiya Tissa	Anuradhapura	Vijaya	307 BC	267 BC	14,600	40 Years
9	8	Uttiya	Anuradhapura	Vijaya	267 BC	257 BC	3,650	10 Years
10	9	Mahasiva	Anuradhapura	Vijaya	257 BC	247 BC	3,650	10 Years
11	10	Suratissa (Swarnapinda Tissa)	Anuradhapura	Vijaya	247 BC	237 BC	3,650	10 Years
12	11	Sena and Guttika	Anuradhapura		237 BC	215 BC	8,030	22 Years
13	12	Asela	Anuradhapura	Vijaya	215 BC	205 BC	3,650	10 Years
14	13	Elara	Anuradhapura	Chola	205 BC	161 BC	16,060	44 Years
15-19	From the era of Devanampiya Tissa until the reign of Elara (who ruled the country from 'Pihiti' rata), there have been 3 Sinhalese kings who ruled the principality of 'Ruhunu' rata: Mahanaga, Gotabhaya, Kavan Tissa; and 2 Sinhalese kings who ruled the principality of 'Maya' rata: Yatala Tissa and Kelani Tissa.							
20	14	Dutugamunu (Duttagamini / Duttagamini Abaya)	Anuradhapura	Vijaya	161 BC	137 BC	8,760	24 Years
21	15	Saddha Tissa	Anuradhapura	Vijaya	137 BC	119 BC	6,570	18 Years
22	16	Thulatthana	Anuradhapura	Vijaya	119 BC	119 BC	30	1 Month
23	17	Lajji Tissa	Anuradhapura	Vijaya	119 BC	109 BC	3,525	9 Y, 8 M
24	18	Khallata Naga	Anuradhapura	Vijaya	109 BC	104 BC	2,190	6 Years
25	19	Valagamba (Vattagamini Abaya) (first reign)	Anuradhapura	Vijaya	104 BC	103 BC	150	5 Months
26	20	Pulahatta	Anuradhapura	5 Dravidians	103 BC	100 BC	1,095	3 Years
27	21	Bahiya	Anuradhapura	5 Dravidians	100 BC	98 BC	730	2 Years
28	22	Panya Mara	Anuradhapura	5 Dravidians	98 BC	91 BC	2,555	7 Years
29	23	Pilaya Mara	Anuradhapura	5 Dravidians	91 BC	90 BC	210	7 Months
30	24	Dathiya	Anuradhapura	5 Dravidians	90 BC	88 BC	730	2 Years
31	25	Valagamba (Vattagamini Abaya) (second reign)	Anuradhapura	Vijaya	89 BC	76 BC	4,380	12 Years
32	26	Mahasilu Mahathis (Mahachulika Tissa)	Anuradhapura	Vijaya	76 BC	62 BC	5,110	14 Years
33	27	Chora Naga	Anuradhapura	Vijaya	62 BC	50 BC	4,380	12 Years
34	28	Kuda Tissa	Anuradhapura	Vijaya	50 BC	47 BC	1,095	3 Years
35		Siva I (Anula's consort 1)	Anuradhapura		47 BC	46 BC	425	1 Y, 2 M
36		Vatuka (Anula's consort 2)	Anuradhapura		46 BC	45 BC	425	1 Y, 2 M
37		Dara Ketithis (Anula's consort 3)	Anuradhapura		45 BC	44 BC	395	1 Y, 1 M
38		Niiliya (Anula's consort 4)	Anuradhapura		44 BC	43 BC	180	6 Months
39	29	Anula	Anuradhapura	Vijaya	43 BC	42 BC	120	4 Months
40	30	Kutakantha Tissa (Makalan Tissa)	Anuradhapura	Vijaya	42 BC	20 BC	8,030	22 Years
41	31	Bhatikabhaya	Anuradhapura	Vijaya	20 BC	9 AD	10,220	28 Years
42	32	Mahadathika Mahanaga (Mahadeliyamana)	Anuradhapura	Vijaya	9	21	4,380	12 Years
43	33	Aamanda Gamani	Anuradhapura	Vijaya	21	30	3,525	9 Y, 8 M
44	34	Kaniirajanu Tissa	Anuradhapura	Vijaya	30	33	1,095	3 Years
45	35	Chulabhaya Tissa	Anuradhapura	Vijaya	34	35	365	1 Year
46	36	Sivali	Anuradhapura	Vijaya	35	35	120	4 Months
47	37	Ilanaga	Anuradhapura	Vijaya	38	44	3,285	9 Years
48	38	Chandramukha Siva (Sandhamuhunu)	Anuradhapura	Vijaya	44	52	2,920	8 Years
49	39	Yasalaalaka Tissa	Anuradhapura	Vijaya	52	60	2,825	7 Y, 9 M
50	40	Subha	Anuradhapura	Vijaya	60	66	2,190	6 Years
51	41	Vasabha	Anuradhapura	Lambakanna I	66	110	16,060	44 Years
52	42	Vankanaasika Tissa	Anuradhapura	Lambakanna I	110	113	1,095	3 Years
53	43	Gajabahu I (Gajaba Gemunu)	Anuradhapura	Lambakanna I	113	135	8,030	22 Years
54	44	Mahallaka Naga	Anuradhapura	Lambakanna I	135	141	2,190	6 Years
55	45	Bhatiya Tissa	Anuradhapura	Lambakanna I	141	165	8,760	24 Years
56	46	Kanittha Tissa	Anuradhapura	Lambakanna I	165	193	10,220	28 Years
57	47	Chula Naga (Sulunaa)	Anuradhapura	Lambakanna I	193	195	730	2 Years
58	48	Kuncha Naga	Anuradhapura	Lambakanna I	195	196	365	1 Year
59	49	Siri Naga I	Anuradhapura	Lambakanna I	196	215	6,935	19 Years
60	50	Vohara Tissa	Anuradhapura	Lambakanna I	215	237	8,030	22 Years
61	51	Abhaya Naga	Anuradhapura	Lambakanna I	237	245	2,920	8 Years
62	52	Siri Naga II	Anuradhapura	Lambakanna I	245	247	730	2 Years
63	53	Vijaya Kumara (Vijayindu)	Anuradhapura	Lambakanna I	247	248	365	1 Year
64	54	Sri Sangha Tissa I	Anuradhapura	Lambakanna I	248	252	1,460	4 Years
65	55	Sri Sangha Bodhi I (Sirisanghabodhi)	Anuradhapura	Lambakanna I	252	254	730	2 Years
66	56	Gotabhaya	Anuradhapura	Lambakanna I	254	267	4,745	13 Years
67	57	Jettha Tissa I (Detuthis)	Anuradhapura	Lambakanna I	267	276	3,650	10 Years
68	58	Mahasen	Anuradhapura	Lambakanna I	276	302	9,855	27 Years
69	59	Kithsirimewan	Anuradhapura	Lambakanna I	302	330	10,220	28 Years
70	60	Jettha Tissa II	Anuradhapura	Lambakanna I	330	339	3,285	9 Years
71	61	Buddhadasa	Anuradhapura	Lambakanna I	339	368	10,585	29 Years
72	62	Upatissa II	Anuradhapura	Lambakanna I	368	410	15,330	42 Years
73	63	Mahanama	Anuradhapura	Lambakanna I	410	432	8,030	22 Years
74	64	Soththisena	Anuradhapura	Lambakanna I	432	432	1	1 Day
75	65	Chattagahaka Janthu	Anuradhapura	Lambakanna I	432	433	365	1 Year
76	66	Mittasena	Anuradhapura	Lambakanna I	433	434	365	1 Year
77	67	Pandu	Anuradhapura	6 Dravidians	434	438	1,825	5 Years
78	68	Prinda	Anuradhapura	6 Dravidians	438	441	1,095	3 Years
79	69	Malkudaparinda	Anuradhapura	6 Dravidians	442	458	5,840	16 Years
80	70	Tiritara	Anuradhapura	6 Dravidians	458	458	60	2 Months
81	71	Dathiya	Anuradhapura	6 Dravidians	458	460	1,095	3 Years
82	72	Pithiya	Anuradhapura	6 Dravidians	460	461	210	7 Months
83	73	Dhatusena	Anuradhapura	Moriya	461	479	6,570	18 Years
84	74	Kashyapa I	Sigiriya	Moriya	479	497	6,570	18 Years
85	75	Mugalan I	Anuradhapura	Moriya	497	515	6,570	18 Years
86	76	Kumaradasa (Kumara Dhatusena)	Anuradhapura	Moriya	515	524	3,285	9 Years
87	77	Keerthisena	Anuradhapura	Moriya	524	525	270	9 Months
88	78	Siva II	Anuradhapura	Moriya	525	525	25	25 Days
89	79	Upatissa III	Anuradhapura	Moriya	525	526	545	1 Y, 6 M
90	80	Silakala (Silakala-Ambaheranasalamevan)	Anuradhapura	Moriya	526	539	4,745	13 Years
91	81	Dathappabhuti	Anuradhapura	Moriya	539	540	180	6 Months
92	82	Mugalan II	Anuradhapura	Moriya	540	560	7,300	20 Years
93	83	Keerthi Sri Meghavarna	Anuradhapura	Moriya	560	561	19	19 Days
94	84	Maha Naga	Anuradhapura	Moriya	561	564	1,095	3 Years
95	85	Agbo I (Aggabodhi I)	Anuradhapura	Moriya	564	598	12,410	34 Years
96	86	Agbo II	Anuradhapura	Moriya	598	608	3,650	10 Years
97	87	Sangha Tissa II	Anuradhapura	Moriya	608	608	60	2 Months
98	88	Mugalan III (Dala-Mugalan)	Anuradhapura	Moriya	608	614	2,190	6 Years
99	89	Shilameghavarna (Asigrahaka)	Anuradhapura	Moriya	614	623	3,285	9 Years
100	90	Agbo III (first reign)	Anuradhapura	Moriya	623	623	180	6 Months
101	91	Jettha Tissa III	Anuradhapura	Moriya	623	624	150	5 Months
102	92	Agbo III (second reign)	Anuradhapura	Moriya	624	640	5,840	16 Years
103	93	Dathopa Tissa I	Anuradhapura	Moriya	640	652	4,380	12 Years
104	94	Kashyapa II	Anuradhapura	Moriya	652	661	3,285	9 Years
105	95	Dappula I	Anuradhapura & Ruhuna	Moriya	661	664	1,095	3 Years
106	96	Dathopa Tissa II (Haththadata)	Anuradhapura	Moriya	664	673	3,285	9 Years
107	97	Agbo IV	Anuradhapura & Polonnaruwa	Moriya	673	689	5,840	16 Years
108	98	Danapitiye Datta	Anuradhapura	Moriya	689	691	730	2 Years
109	99	Haththadata II (Hunnaru-Haththadata)	Anuradhapura	Moriya	691	691	180	6 Months
110	100	Maanavamma	Anuradhapura	Lambakanna II	691	726	12,775	35 Years
111	101	Agbo V	Anuradhapura	Lambakanna II	726	732	2,190	6 Years
112	102	Kashyapa III	Anuradhapura	Lambakanna II	732	738	2,190	6 Years
113	103	Mihindu I (Mihindu Aadipada)	Anuradhapura	Lambakanna II	738	741	1,095	3 Years
114	104	Agbo VI (Salamevan)	Anuradhapura	Lambakanna II	741	781	14,600	40 Years
115	105	Agbo VII	Polonnaruwa	Lambakanna II	781	787	2,190	6 Years
116	106	Mihindu II	Anuradhapura	Lambakanna II	787	807	7,300	20 Years
117	107	Dappula II	Anuradhapura	Lambakanna II	807	812	1,825	5 Years
118	108	Mihindu III	Anuradhapura	Lambakanna II	812	816	1,460	4 Years
119	109	Agbo VIII	Anuradhapura	Lambakanna II	816	827	4,015	11 Years
120	110	Dappula III	Beraminipaya	Lambakanna II	827	843	5,840	16 Years
121	111	Agbo IX	Anuradhapura	Lambakanna II	843	846	1,095	3 Years
122	112	Sena I (Silameghasena)	Anuradhapura	Lambakanna II	846	866	7,300	20 Years
123	113	Sena II	Anuradhapura	Lambakanna II	866	901	12,775	35 Years
124	114	Udaya I	Anuradhapura	Lambakanna II	901	912	4,015	11 Years
125	115	Kashyapa IV	Anuradhapura	Lambakanna II	912	929	6,205	17 Years
126	116	Kashyapa V	Anuradhapura	Lambakanna II	929	939	3,650	10 Years
127	117	Dappula IV	Anuradhapura	Lambakanna II	939	940	210	7 Months
128	118	Dappula V	Anuradhapura	Lambakanna II	940	952	4,380	12 Years
129	119	Udaya II	Anuradhapura	Lambakanna II	952	955	1,095	3 Years
130	120	Sena III	Anuradhapura	Lambakanna II	955	964	3,285	9 Years
131	121	Udaya III	Anuradhapura	Lambakanna II	964	972	2,920	8 Years
132	122	Sena IV	Anuradhapura	Lambakanna II	972	975	1,095	3 Years
133	123	Mihindu IV	Anuradhapura	Lambakanna II	975	991	5,840	16 Years
134	124	Sena V	Anuradhapura	Lambakanna II	991	1001	3,650	10 Years
135	125	Mihindu V	Anuradhapura & Kapugalnuwara	Lambakanna II	1001	1017	5,840	16 Years
136-144	After Mihindu V, until the coronation of Vijayabahu I, a subordinate of Rajendra Chola I ruled 'Pihiti' rata from Polonnaruwa and 8 regional kings ruled the principality of 'Ruhuna': Vikramabahu, Kirthi, Mahalana Kirthi, Vikkama Pandya, Jagathpala, Pârakkama Pandya, Lokeshwara and Keshadatu-Kashyapa.							
145	126	Vijayabahu I (Maha Vijayabahu)	Polonnaruwa	Vijayabahu	1055	1111	20,075	55 Years
146	127	Jayabahu I	Polonnaruwa	Vijayabahu	1110	1111	365	1 Year
147	128	Vikramabahu I	Polonnaruwa	Vijayabahu	1111	1132	7,665	21 Years
148	129	Gajabahu II	Polonnaruwa	Vijayabahu	1132	1153	8,030	22 Years
149-151	Parallel to Vikramabahu I and Gajabahu II who were ruling from Polonnaruwa; Manabharana, Kitti Sri Megha and Sri Vallabha ruled the principalities of Maya & Ruhuna.							
152	130	Parakramabahu I (Maha Parakramabahu)	Polonnaruwa	Vijayabahu	1153	1186	12,045	33 Years
153	131	Vijayabahu II	Polonnaruwa	Vijayabahu	1186	1187	365	1 Year
154	132	Mihindu VI	Polonnaruwa	Vijayabahu	1187	1187	5	5 Days
155	133	Nissanka Malla (Keerthi Nissanka)	Polonnaruwa	Kalinga	1187	1196	3,285	9 Years
156	134	Vira Bahu I	Polonnaruwa	Kalinga	1196	1196	1	1 Day
157	135	Vikramabahu II	Polonnaruwa	Kalinga	1196	1196	90	3 Months
158	136	Chodaganga	Polonnaruwa	Kalinga	1196	1197	270	9 Months
159	137	Lilavati (first reign)	Polonnaruwa	Vijayabahu	1197	1200	1,095	3 Years
160	138	Sahassa Malla	Polonnaruwa	Kalinga	1200	1202	730	2 Years
161	139	Kalyanavati	Polonnaruwa	Kalinga	1202	1208	2,190	6 Years
162	140	Dharmasoka	Polonnaruwa	Kalinga	1208	1209	365	1 Year
163	141	Anikanga	Polonnaruwa	Kalinga	1209	1209	17	17 Days
164	142	Lilavati (second reign)	Polonnaruwa	Vijayabahu	1209	1210	365	1 Year
165	143	Lokeshwara	Polonnaruwa		1210	1211	270	9 Months
166	144	Lilavati (third reign)	Polonnaruwa	Vijayabahu	1211	1212	210	7 Months
167	145	Parakrama Pandyan II	Polonnaruwa	Pandyan	1212	1215	1,095	3 Years
168	146	Kalinga Magha	Polonnaruwa	Kalinga	1215	1236	7,665	21 Years
169-171	Following Kalinga Magha, the Southeast Asian invader Chandrabhanu and leaders of Aryacakravarti dynasty including Kulasekara Cinkaiariyan and Kulotunga Cinkaiariyan ruled the principality of 'Jaffna' which also accounts to the hiatus of 1284-1287 where Parakramabahu III and Buvanekabahu II fought for the throne.							
172	147	Vijayabahu III	Dambadeniya	Siri Sanga Bo	1232	1236	1,460	4 Years
173	148	Parakramabahu II (Kalikala Sahithya Sarwakgna Panditha)	Dambadeniya	Siri Sanga Bo	1236	1270	12,775	35 Years
174	149	Vijayabahu IV (Bosath Vijayabahu)	Dambadeniya	Siri Sanga Bo	1271	1272	730	2 Years
175	150	Buvanekabahu I	Dambadeniya & Yapahuwa	Siri Sanga Bo	1272	1284	4,380	12 Years
176	151	Parakramabahu III	Polonnaruwa	Siri Sanga Bo	1287	1292	1,825	5 Years
177	152	Buvanekabahu II (Srinivasa Buvanekabahu)	Yapahuwa & Kurunegala	Siri Sanga Bo	1292	1302	3,285	9 Years
178	153	Parakramabahu IV (Panditha Parakramabahu)	Kurunegala	Siri Sanga Bo	1302	1326	8,760	24 Years
179	154	Buvanekabahu III (Vanni Buvanekabahu)	Uncertain	Siri Sanga Bo	1326	?		Uncertain
180	155	Vijayabahu V (Saulu Vijayabahu)	Uncertain	Siri Sanga Bo	?	1347		Uncertain
181	156	Buvanekabahu IV	Gampola	Siri Sanga Bo	1347	1351	1,460	4 Years
182	157	Parakramabahu V	Gampola	Siri Sanga Bo	1351	1359	3,285	9 Years
183	158	Vikramabahu III	Gampola	Siri Sanga Bo	1360	1374	5,110	14 Years
184	159	Buvanekabahu V	Gampola	Siri Sanga Bo	1372	1391	7,300	20 Years
185	160	Vira Bahu II	Gampola	Siri Sanga Bo	1391	1409	6,935	19 Years
186-188	From 1410 to 1414, Alakesvara (Alagakkonara), Parakrama Epa (Senkadagala Parakramabahu) and Dedigama Parakramabahu ruled certain principalities.							
189	161	Sri Parakramabahu VI	Kotte	Siri Sanga Bo	1415	1467	18,980	52 Years
190	162	Jayabahu II	Kotte	Siri Sanga Bo	1467	1469	730	2 Years
191	163	Buvanekabahu VI (Sapumal)	Kotte	Siri Sanga Bo	1469	1480	4,015	11 Years
192	164	Parakramabahu VII	Kotte	Siri Sanga Bo	1480	1484	1,460	4 Years
193	165	Weera Parakramabahu VIII (Ambuluwa)	Kotte	Siri Sanga Bo	1484	1509	9,125	25 Years
194	166	Dharma Parakramabahu IX	Kotte	Siri Sanga Bo	1509	1518	3,285	9 Years
195	167	Vijayabahu VI	Kotte	Siri Sanga Bo	1518	1521	1,460	4 Years
196-201	Towards the end of the reign of Sri Parakramabahu VI, the principality of 'Kandy' was established in 1463 and was ruled by Senasammata Vikramabahu, Jayavira Bandara, Karalliyadde Bandara and Kusumasana Devi until 1581. Following the Vijayabā Kollaya in 1521, while Buvanekabahu VII started ruling 'Kotte', the principality of 'Sitawaka' was established and ruled by Mayadunne until 1581, and the principality of 'Raigama' was ruled by Raigama Bandara (Pararajasinha) until 1538 and then by Mayadunne until 1581.							
202	168	Buvanekabahu VII	Kotte	Siri Sanga Bo	1521	1551	10,950	30 Years
203	169	Don Juan Dharmapala	Kotte	Siri Sanga Bo	1551	1581	11,315	31 Years
204	170	Rajasinha I (Sitawaka Rajasinha / Prince Tikiri)	Sitawaka	Siri Sanga Bo	1581	1592	4,015	11 Years
205	171	Vimaladharmasuriya I (Konappu Bandara)	Kandy	Dinajara	1592	1604	4,380	12 Years
206	172	Senarath	Kandy	Dinajara	1604	1634	11,315	31 Years
207	173	Rajasinha II (Devarajasinghe / Deva Astana)	Kandy	Dinajara	1634	1684	18,250	50 Years
208	174	Vimaladharmasurya II	Kandy	Dinajara	1684	1707	8,395	23 Years
209	175	Vira Parakrama Narendra Singha	Kandy	Dinajara	1707	1739	11,680	32 Years
210	176	Sri Vijaya Rajasinha	Kandy	Nayaks	1739	1747	2,920	8 Years
211	177	Kirti Sri Rajasinha	Kandy	Nayaks	1747	1782	13,140	36 Years
212	178	Rajadhi Rajasinha	Kandy	Nayaks	1782	1798	5,840	16 Years
213	179	Sri Vikrama Rajasinha	Kandy	Nayaks	1798	1815	6,205	17 Years

== See also ==
- List of longest-reigning monarchs
- List of shortest-reigning monarchs
- Lists of state leaders
- Records of heads of state
