= List of state leaders in the 7th century =

This is a list of state leaders in the 7th century (601–700) AD.

== Africa ==
=== Africa: East ===
- Kingdom of Aksum (complete list) –

- Gersem, King (c.600)
- Armah, King (c.614)
- Ashama ibn-Abjar, King (?–c.630)

=== Africa: Northeast ===
- Makuria (complete list) –

- Merkurios, King (697–c.722)
- Zacharias I, King (c.722)

== Americas ==
=== Americas: Mesoamerica ===
Maya civilization

- Calakmul (complete list) –

- Scroll Serpent, King (579–611)
- Yuknoom Tiʼ Chan, King (619)
- Tajoom Ukʼab Kʼahkʼ, King (622–630)
- Yuknoom Head, King (630–636)
- Yuknoom Chʼeen II, King (636–686)
- Yuknoom Yichʼaak Kʼahkʼ, King (686–c.695)
- Split Earth, King (c.695)

- Copán (complete list) –

- Kʼakʼ Chan Yopaat, King (578–628)
- Chan Imix Kʼawiil, King (628–695)
- Uaxaclajuun Ubʼaah Kʼawiil, King (695–738)

- Palenque (complete list) –

- Yohl Ikʼnal, Queen (583–604)
- Ajen Yohl Mat, Ajaw (605–612)
- Janahb Pakal, Nobleman (c.612)
- Sak Kʼukʼ, Queen (612–615)
- Kʼinich Janaabʼ Pakal, Ajaw (615–683)
- Kʼinich Kan Bahlam II, Ajaw (684–702)

- Tikal (complete list) –

- 23rd Ruler, Ajaw (c.635)
- 24th Ruler, Ajaw (c.645)
- Nuun Ujol Chaak, Ajaw (pre-657–c.679)
- Jasaw Chan Kʼawiil I, Ajaw (682–734)

== Asia ==
=== Asia: Central ===
- Xueyantuo (complete list) –

- Yiedie, Khan (600s–610s)
- Zhenzhu, Khan (628–645)
- Duomi, Khan (645–646)
- Yitewushi, Khan (646)

Tibet

- Tibetan Empire (complete list) –

- Tagbu Nyasig, King (579–619)
- Namri Songtsen, King (?–629)
- Songtsen Gampo, Emperor (618–649)
- Gungsrong Gungtsen, Emperor (638–c.655)
- Mangsong Mangtsen, Emperor (653–676)
- Tridu Songtsen, Emperor (676–704)
- Khri ma lod, Empress (675–689, 704–712)

Kazakhstan

- Gaochang

- Qú Qiángù, ruler (560-601)
- Qú Bóyǎ[42], ruler (601-613, 619-623)
- unnamed usurper, ruler (613-619)
- Qú Wéntài, ruler (623-640)
- Qú Zhìshèng, ruler (640)

=== Asia: East ===
Turks

- Eastern Turkic Khaganate (complete list) –

- Yami, Qaghan (603–609)
- Shibi, Qaghan (611–619)
- Chuluo, Qaghan (619–621)
- Illig, Qaghan (620–630)
- Qilibi, Qaghan (639–645)
- Chebi, Qaghan (c.646–650)

- Second Turkic Khaganate (complete list) –

- Ilterish, Founder, Qaghan (681–694)
- Qapaghan, Qaghan (694–716)

China: Sui dynasty

- Sui dynasty (complete list) –

- Wen, Emperor (581–604)
- Yang, Emperor (604–618)
- Yang You, Emperor (617–618)
- Yang Tong, Emperor (618–619)

China: Tang dynasty

- Tang dynasty (complete list) –

- Gaozu, Emperor (618–626)
- Taizong, Emperor (626–649)
- Gaozong, Emperor (650–683)
- Zhongzong, Emperor (684, 705–710)
- Ruizong, Emperor (684–690, 710–712)

- Zhou dynasty –

- Wu Zetian, Empress regnant (690–705)

Japan

- Japan, Asuka period (complete list) –

- Suiko, Empress (592–628)
- Jomei, Emperor (629–641)
- Kōgyoku, Empress (642–645)
- Kōtoku, Emperor (645–654)
- Saimei, Empress (655–661)
- Tenji, Emperor (661–672)
- Kōbun, Emperor (672)
- Tenmu, Emperor (672–686)
- Jitō, Empress (686–697)
- Monmu, Emperor (697–707)

Korea

- Baekje (complete list) –

- Beop, King (599–600)
- Mu, King (600–641)
- Uija, King (641–660)

- Goguryeo (complete list) –

- Yeong-yang, King (590–618)
- Yeong-nyu, King (618–642)
- Bojang, King (642–668)

- Silla (complete list) –

- Jinpyeong, King (579–632)
- Seondeok, King (632–647)
- Jindeok, King (647–654)
- Muyeol, King (654–661)

- Later Silla (complete list) –

- Munmu, King (661–681)
- Sinmun, King (681–691)
- Hyoso, King (692–702)

- Balhae (complete list) –

- Go, King (698–719)

=== Asia: Southeast ===
Cambodia

- Chenla (complete list) –

- Mohendravarman, King (c.590–611)
- Isanavarman I, King (616–637)
- Bhavavarman II, King (639–657)
- Jayavarman I, King (c.657–681/690)
- Jayavedi, Queen (c.681–713)

Indonesia: Java

- East Java –

- Dewasimha, King (7th/8th century)

- Shailendra dynasty –

- Santanu, King (c.650)
- Dapunta Selendra, King (c.674)

- Kalingga Kingdom: Shailendra dynasty –

- Shima, Queen (674—703)

- Tarumanagara (complete list) –

- Kertawarman, Maharaja (561–628)
- Linggawarman, Maharaja (628–650)
- Tarusbawa, Maharaja (669–690)

- Sunda Kingdom (complete list) –

- Tarusbawa, Maharaja (669–723)

- Galuh Kingdom (complete list) –

- Wretikandayun, Maharaja (612-702)

Malaysia: Peninsular

- Kedah Sultanate (complete list) –

- Maha Dewa II, Maharaja (c.580–620)
- Maha Dewa III, Maharaja (c.620–660)
- DiMaharaja Putra II, Maharaja (c.660–712)

Thailand

- Ngoenyang (complete list) –

- Lavachakkaraj, King (638–mid 7th century)
- Lao Khao Kaew Mah Mueng, King (late 7th century)
- Lao Sao, King (7th–8th century)

- Hariphunchai (complete list) –

- Camadevi, Queen (7th/8th century)

Vietnam

- Champa (complete list) –

- Kandarpadharma, King (629–?)
- Prabhasadharma, King (?–645)
- Bhadresvaravarman, King (645–?)
- Isanavarman, Queen (?–653)
- Vikrantavarman I, King (653–c.686)
- Vikrantavarman II, King (c.686–c.731)

- Early Lý dynasty (complete list) –

- Hậu Lý Nam Đế, Emperor (571–603)

=== Asia: South ===
Afghanistan

- Turk Shahi (complete list) –

- Shahi Tegin, King (680–739)

Bengal and Northeast India

- Gauda Kingdom (complete list) –

- Shashanka, King (c.590–625)
- Manava, King (625)

- Kamarupa: Varman dynasty (complete list) –

- Bhaskaravarman, King (600–650)
- Avantivarman, King (unknown)

- Kamarupa: Mlechchha dynasty (complete list) –

- Salasthamba, King (650–670)
- Vigrahastambha, King (670–680)
- Palaka, King (680–695)
- Kumara, King (695–710)

- Khadga dynasty –

- Khadgodyama, King (625–640)
- Jatakhadga, King (640–658)
- Devakhadga, King (658–673)
- Rajabhat, King (673–707)

- Mallabhum (complete list) –

- Adi Malla, King (694–710)

India

- Chahamanas of Shakambhari (complete list) –

- Samantaraja, King (c.684–709)

- Chalukya dynasty (complete list) –

- Mangalesha, King (c.592–610)
- Pulakeshin II, King (c.610–642)
- Adityavarman, King (c.643–645)
- Abhinavaditya, King (c.645–646)
- Chandraditya, King (c.646–649)
- Vijaya-Bhattarika, Regent (c.650–655)
- Vikramaditya I, King (c.655–680)
- Vinayaditya, King (680–696)
- Vijayaditya, King (696–733)

- Eastern Chalukyas (complete list) –

- Kubja Vishnuvardhana, King (624–641)
- Jayasimha I, King (641–673)
- Indra Bhattaraka, King (673)
- Vishnu Vardhana II, King (673–682)
- Mangi Yuvaraja, King (682–706)

- Eastern Ganga dynasty (complete list) –

- Indravarman III, King (589–652)
- Gunarnava, King (652–682)
- Devendravarman I, King (c.652–682)

- Western Ganga dynasty (complete list) –

- Mushkara, King (579–604)
- Polavira, King (604–629)
- Srivikrama, King (629–654)
- Bhuvikarma, King (654–679)
- Shivamara I, King (679–726)

- Kalachuris of Tripuri (complete list) –

- Vamaraja-deva, King (675–700)

- Maitraka dynasty (complete list) –

- Śīlāditya I, King (c.595–c.615)
- Kharagraha I, King (c.615–c.626)
- Dharasena III, King (c.626–c.640)
- Dhruvasena II, King (c.640–c.644)
- Chakravarti, King (c.644–c.651)
- Dhruvasena III, King (c.650–c.654–655)
- Kharagraha II, King (c.655–c.658)
- Śīlāditya II, King (c.658–c.685)
- Śīlāditya III, King (c.690–c.710)

- Maukhari dynasty (complete list) –

- Graha-varman, King (c.600–605)

- Pallava dynasty –

- The Pallava dynasty has two chronologies of rulers.
- Mahendravarman I, King (6th/7th century)
- Narasimhavarman I, King (630–668)
- Mahendravarman II, King (668–672)
- Paramesvaravarman I, King (late 7th century)

- Empire of Harsha –

- Harsha, King (c.606–c.647)

- Pandyan dynasty (complete list) –

- Kadungon, King (590–620)
- Koon Pandiyan, King (7th century)
- Maravarman Avanisulamani, King (c.620–645)
- Jayantavarman, King (c.645–670)
- Arikesari Maravarman, King (c.670–710)

- Pushyabhuti dynasty (complete list) –

- Prabhakara-vardhana, King (c.580–605)
- Rajya-vardhana, King (c.605–606)
- Harsha, King (c.606–c.647)

- Vishnukundina dynasty (complete list) –

- Janssraya Madhava Varma IV, Maharaja (573–621)

Pakistan

- Rai dynasty (complete list) –

- Rai Sahiras II, King (early 7th century)
- Rai Sahasi II, King (early 7th century)

Sri Lanka

- Anuradhapura Kingdom, Sri Lanka (complete list) –

- Aggabodhi II, King (598–608)
- Sangha Tissa II, King (608–608)
- Moggallana III, King (608–614)
- Silameghavanna, King (614–623)
- Aggabodhi III, King (623–623)
- Jettha Tissa III, King (623–624)
- Aggabodhi III, King (624–640)
- Dathopa Tissa I, King (640–652)
- Kassapa II, King (652–661)
- Dappula I, King (661–664)
- Dathopa Tissa II, King (664–673)
- Aggabodhi IV, King (673–689)
- Unhanagara Hatthadatha, King (691–691)
- Manavanna, King (691–726)

=== Asia: West ===
Islam

- Muslims –

- Muhammad, Prophet (c.610–632)

- Rashidun Caliphate (complete list) –

- Abu Bakr, Caliph (632–634)
- Umar, Caliph (634–644)
- Uthman, Caliph (644–656)
- Ali, Caliph (656–661)

- Hasan ibn Ali's Caliphate (complete list) –

- Hasan ibn Ali, Caliph (661)

- Umayyad Caliphate (complete list) –

- Muawiyah I, Caliph (661 — 680)
- Yazid I, Caliph (680–683)
- Muawiya II, Caliph (683–684)
- Marwan I, Caliph (684–685)
- Abd al-Malik, Caliph (685–705)

Turks

- Western Turkic Khaganate (complete list) –

- Niri, Qaghan of the Apa line (c.600)
- Heshana, Qaghan (603–611)
- Shikui, Qaghan (611–618)
- Tong Yabghu, Qaghan (618–628)
- Külüg Sibir, Qaghan (630–631)
- Irbis Bolun Cabgu, Qaghan (631–633)
- Dulu, Qaghan (633–634)
- Ishbara Tolis, Qaghan (634–638)
- Yukuk Shad, Qaghan (638–642)
- Irbis Seguy, Qaghan (642–651)
- Ashina Helu, Qaghan (651–658)

Persia

- Persia: Sasanian Empire (complete list) –

- Khosrow II, Shahanshah, King of Kings (591–628)
- Vistahm,§ Shahanshah, King of Kings (591–596)
- Kavadh II, Shahanshah, King of Kings (628)
- Ardashir III, Shahanshah, King of Kings (628–629)
- Shahrbaraz, rival/usurper Shahanshah, King of Kings (629)
- Khosrow III, rival/usurper Shahanshah, King of Kings (629)
- Borandukht, Shahanshah, King of Kings (629–630)
- Shapur-i Shahrvaraz,§ Shahanshah, King of Kings (630)
- Peroz II,§ Shahanshah, King of Kings (630)
- Azarmidokht, Shahanshah, King of Kings (630–631)
- Farrukh Hormizd, rival/usurper Shahanshah, King of Kings (630–631)
- Hormizd VI, rival/usurper Shahanshah, King of Kings (630–631)
- Khosrow IV, rival/usurper Shahanshah, King of Kings (631)
- Farrukhzad Khosrau V,§ Shahanshah, King of Kings (631)
- Boran, Shahanshah, King of Kings (631–632)
- Yazdegerd III, Shahanshah, King of Kings (632–651)

- Dabuyid dynasty (complete list) –

- Gil Gavbara, Spahbed (642–660)
- Dabuya, Spahbed (660–712)

Yemen

- Yemeni Zaidi State (complete list) –

- Al-Hasan al-Muthanna, Imam (680–706)

== Europe ==
=== Europe: Balkans ===
- Old Great Bulgaria –

- Organa, Regent (617–630)
- Gostun, Regent (c.630–c.632)
- Kubrat, ruler (c.632–c.650/65)

- First Bulgarian Empire (complete list) –

- Asparuh, Khan (c.681–701)

- Byzantine Empire (complete list) –

- Maurice, Emperor (582–602)
- Theodosius, Co-Emperor (590–602)
- Phocas, Emperor (602–610)
- Heraclius, Emperor (610–641)
- Constantine III, co-Emperor (613–641), Emperor (641)
- Heraklonas, co-Emperor (641), Emperor (641)
- Constans II, Emperor (641–668)
- Constantine IV, co-Emperor (654–668), Emperor (668–685)
- Heraclius, Co-Emperor (659–681)
- Tiberius, Co-Emperor (659–681)
- Justinian II, co-Emperor (681–685), Emperor (685–695, 705–711)
- Leontios, Emperor (695–698)
- Tiberios III, Emperor (698–705)
- Justinian II, co-Emperor (668–685), Emperor (685–695, 705–711)

- Principality of Serbia (complete list) –

- unknown archon (fl.610–641)

=== Europe: British Isles ===
Man

- Isle of Man (complete list) –

- Diwg, client King (c.600s)
- Edwin of Northumbria, King (620–633)
- Merfyn Fawr, King (?–c.682)
- Anarawd Gwalchcrwn, King (c.682–?)

Great Britain: Scotland

- Dál Riata (complete list) –

- Áedán mac Gabráin, King (?–c.606)
- Eochaid Buide, King (?–c.629)
- Connad Cerr, King (?–c.629)
- Domnall Brecc, King (?–c.642)
- Ferchar mac Connaid, King (unknown)
- Dúnchad mac Conaing, King (?–c.654)
- Conall Crandomna, King (?–c.660)
- Domangart mac Domnaill, King (?–c.660)
- Máel Dúin mac Conaill, King (?–c.689)
- Domnall Donn, King (?–c.696)
- Ferchar Fota, King (?–c.697)
- Eochaid mac Domangairt, King (unknown)
- Ainbcellach mac Ferchair, King (?–c.698)
- Fiannamail ua Dúnchado, King (?–700)

- Picts (complete list) –

- Nechtan nepos Uerb, King (595–616)
- Cinioch, King (616–631)
- Gartnait III, King (631–635)
- Bridei II, King (635–641)
- Talorc III, King (641–653)
- Talorgan I, King (653–657)
- Gartnait IV, King (657–663)
- Drest VI, King (663–672)
- Bridei III, King (672–693)
- Taran, King (693–697)
- Bridei IV, King (697–706)
- Nechtan, King (706–724, 728–729)

- Kingdom of Strathclyde / Alt Clut (complete list) –

- Rhydderch Hael, King, (fl.573–612)
- Neithon / Nechtan / Nwython, King (612–621)
- Beli I, King (621–633)
- Eugein I, King (633–645)
- Guret, King (645–658)
- Mermin, King (?–682)
- Elfin(?–693)
- Dumnagual II, King (693–694)
- Beli II, King (694–722)

Great Britain: Northumbria

- Bernicia (complete list) –

- Æthelfrith, King (593–616)
- Edwin, King (616–632)
- Eanfrith, King (632–633)
- Oswald, King (634–641)
- Oswiu, King (642–670)

- Deira (complete list) –

- Æthelric, King (589–604)
- Æthelfrith, King (604–616)
- Edwin, King (616–632)
- Osric, King (633–634)
- Oswald, King (634–642)
- Oswiu, King (642–644)
- Oswine, King (644–651)
- Œthelwald, King (651–654)
- Oswiu, King (654–670)
- Alchfrith, Co-King (656–664)
- Ælfwine, King (670–679)

- Kingdom of Northumbria (complete list) –

- Oswiu, King (642–670)
- Ecgfrith, King (670–685)
- Ealdfrith, King (685–704/705)

Great Britain: England

- The Britons (complete list) –

- Selyf ap Cynan, King (?–c.613)
- Ceretic of Elmet, King (c.614–617)
- Cadwallon ap Cadfan, King (?–634)
- Idris, King (?–635)
- Eugein I of Alt Clut, King (c.642)
- Cadwaladr, King (c.654–c.664)
- Geraint, King (c.670–c.710)

- Dumnonia (complete list) –

- Bledric ap Custennin, King (c.598–c.613)
- Clemen ap Bledric, King (c.613–c.633)
- Petroc Baladrddellt, King (c.633–c.654)
- Culmin ap Petroc, King (c.659–c.661)
- Donyarth ap Culmin, King (c.661–c.700)
- Geraint of Dumnonia, King (c.700–c.710)

- Kingdom of East Anglia (complete list) –

- Rædwald, King (593–624)
- Eorpwald, King (625–627)
- Ricberht, King (c.627–630)
- Sigeberht, Co-King (c.629–c.634)
- Ecgric, Co-King (c.630–c.636)
- Anna, King (c.636–654)
- Æthelhere, King (653/654–655)
- Æthelwold, King (c.654–664)
- Ealdwulf, King (663–c.713)

- Kingdom of Essex (complete list) –

- Sledd, King (587–604)
- Sæberht, Co-King (604–616/617)
- Sexred, Co-King (616/617–617)
- Sæward, Co-King (616/617–617)
- Sigeberht I (the Little), King (617–653)
- Sigeberht II (the Good), King (653–660)
- Swithhelm, King (660–664)
- Sighere, Co-King (664–683)
- Sæbbi, Co-King (664–694)
- Sigeheard, Co-King (694–709)
- Swæfred, Co-King (694–709)

- Kingdom of Kent (complete list) –

- Æthelberht I, King (c.590–616)
- Eadbald, King (616–640)
- Eorcenberht, King (640–664)
- Eormenred, King (unknown)
- Ecgberht I, King (664–673)
- Hlothhere, King (674/675–685)
- Eadric, King (685–686)
- Mul, King (killed 687)
- Swæfheard, King (687/688–post–692)
- Swæfberht, King (fl. 689)
- Oswine, King (fl. 689–690)
- Wihtred, King (c.693–725)

- Mercia (complete list –

- Creoda, King (c.585–593)
- Pybba, King (c.593–606/615)
- Cearl, King (?–c.626)
- Eowa, King (c.626–642)
- Penda, King (c.626–655)
- Peada, King (655–656)
- Oswiu, King (c.657)
- Wulfhere, King (658–675)
- Æthelred I, King (675–704)

- Kingdom of Sussex (complete list) –

- Æðelwealh, King (fl. c.660–c.685)
- Eadwulf, King (fl. c.683)
- Ecgwald, King (fl. c.683–c.685)
- Berhthun, King (fl. 685)
- Andhun, King (fl. 685)
- Noðhelm, King (fl. 692–717)
- Watt, King (fl. 692–c.700)
- Bryni, King (fl. c.700)

- Kingdom of Wessex (complete list) –

- Ceolwulf, King (597–611)
- Cynegils, King (611–643)
- Cwichelm, King (c.626–636)
- Cenwalh, King (643–645, 648–674)
- Penda of Mercia, King (645–648)
- Seaxburh, King (672–674)
- Æscwine, King (674–676)
- Centwine, King (676–685)
- Cædwalla, King (685–688)
- Ine, King (688–726)

Great Britain: Wales

- Kingdom of Ceredigion/ Seisyllwg –

- Arthlwys ap Arthwfoddw, King (595–630)
- Clydog ap Arthlwys, King (630–665)
- Seisyll ap Clydog, King (665–700)
- Arthen ap Seisyll, King (700–735)

- Kingdom of Gwent (complete list) –

- Athrwys ap Meurig, King (c.620)
- Morgan the Courteous and Benefactor, King (?–654)
- Anthres ap Morcant ?, King (654–663)

- Kingdom of Gwynedd (complete list) –

- Iago ap Beli, King (c.599–c.616)
- Cadfan ap Iago, King (c.613–c.625)
- Cadwallon ap Cadfan, King (c.625–634)
- Cadafael Cadomedd ap Cynfeddw, King (634–c.655)
- Cadwaladr, King (c.655–c.682)
- Idwal Roebuck, King (c.682–c.720)

- Kingdom of Powys (complete list) –

- Cynan Garwyn, King (582–610)
- Selyf ap Cynan, King (610–613)
- Manwgan ap Selyf, King (613)
- Eiludd Powys, King (613–?)
- Beli ap Eiludd, King (655)
- Gwylog ap Beli, King (695–725)

Ireland

- Ireland (complete list) –

- Áed Uaridnach, High King (601–607)
- Máel Coba mac Áedo, High King (608–610)
- Suibne Menn, High King (611–623)
- Domnall mac Áedo, High King (624–639)
- Cellach and Conall, High Kings (640–656)
- Diarmait and Blathmac, High Kings (657–664)
- Sechnassach, High King (665–669)
- Cenn Fáelad, High King (670–673)
- Fínsnechta Fledach, High King (674–693)
- Loingsech mac Óengusso, High King (694–701)

- Airgíalla (complete list) –

- Aed mac Colgan, King (?–606)
- Mael Odhar Macha, King (?–636)
- Dunchad mac Ultan, King (?–c.677)
- Mael Fothartaig mac Mael Dubh, King (fl.697)

- Breifne (complete list) –

- Maenach mac Báithin, King (c.653)

- Connachta (complete list) –

- Muiredach Muillethan, King (697–702)

- Leinster (complete list) –

- Cellach Cualann, King (693–715)

- Uí Maine (complete list) –

- Seachnasach, King (691–711)

- Ulaid / Ulster (complete list) –

- Bécc Bairrche mac Blathmaic, King (692–707)

=== Europe: Central ===
- Bavaria (complete list) –

- Tassilo I, Duke (591–610)
- Garibald II, Duke (610–625)
- Theodo, Duke (c.680–716)

- Duchy of Alsace (see also) –

- Uncilin, Duke (587–607)
- Gunzo, Duke (fl.613)
- Chrodobert, Duke (fl.630)
- Gundoin, Duke (fl.630s)
- Leuthari II, Duke (fl.642)
- Boniface, Duke (?–c.662)
- Adalrich, Duke (c.662–post-683)
- Adalbert, Duke (post-683–723)

- Samo's Empire

- Samo, King (623–658)

- Old Saxony (complete list) –

- Berthoald, Duke (fl.622)

- Sorbs –

- Dervan, Duke (fl.615–636)

- Thuringia (complete list) –

- Radulf, Duke (c.633–642) King (c.642)
- Heden I, Duke (642–687)
- Gozbert, Duke (687–689)
- Heden II, Duke (689–719)

=== Europe: East ===
- Old Great Bulgaria –

- Kubrat, Khan (632–665)
- Batbayan, Khan (665–668)

- Volga Bulgaria (complete list) –

- Kotrag, Potentate (675–710)

- Khazar Khaganate (complete list) –

Ashina dynasty: Khazar Khagans
- Ziebel, Khagan (618–630)
- Böri Shad, Khagan (630–650)
- Irbis, Khagan (650)
- Khalga, Khagan (mid 660s)
- Kaban, Khagan (late 660s)
- Busir, Khagan (c.690–715)
Khazar Beks
- Chorpan Tarkhan, Bek (c.630)

- Utigurs –

- Organa, Kavkhan, Regent for Kubrat (617–630)
- Gostun, Kavkhan, Regent for Kubrat (c.630)

=== Europe: Nordic ===
- Sweden (complete list) –

- Sölve, King (late 6th–early 7th century)
- Ingvar Harra, King (early 7th century)
- Anund, King (early–mid 7th century)
- Ingjald, King (mid 7th century)
- Ivar Vidfamne, King (c.655–c.695)

=== Europe: Southcentral ===
- Principality of Benevento (complete list) –

- Zotto, Duke (571–591)
- Arechis I, Duke (591–641)
- Aiulf I, Duke (641–642)
- Radoald, Duke (642–647)
- Grimoald I, Duke (647–662)
- Romoald I, Duke (662–687)
- Grimoald II, Duke (687–689)
- Gisulf I, Duke (689–706)

- Kingdom of the Lombards (complete list) –

- Agilulf, King (590–616)
- Adaloald, King (616–626)
- Arioald, King (626–636)
- Rothari, King (636-652)
- Rodoald, King (652–653)
- Aripert I, King (653–661)
- Godepert, King (661–662)
- Perctarit, King (661–662)
- Grimoald, King (662–671)
- Garibald, King (671)
- Perctarit, King (671–688)
- Cunipert, King (688–689)
- Alahis, King (689)
- Cunipert, King (689–700)
- Liutpert, King (700–702)

- Duchy of Spoleto (complete list) –

- Ariulf, Duke (592–602)
- Theodelap, Duke (602–650)
- Atto, Duke (650–665)
- Transamund I, Duke (665–703)

- Republic of Venice (complete list) –

- Paolo Lucio Anafesto, Doge (697–717)

=== Europe: Southwest ===
- Visigothic Kingdom (complete list) –

- Liuva II, King (601–603)
- Witteric, King (603–610)
- Gundemar, King (610–612)
- Sisebut, King (612–621)
- Reccared II, King (621)
- Suintila, King (621–631)
- Reccimer, King (626–631)
- Sisenand, King (631–636)
- Iudila, King (632–633)
- Chintila, King (636–640)
- Tulga, King (640–641)
- Chindasuinth, King (641–653)
- Recceswinth, King (649–672)
- Froia, King (653)
- Wamba, King (672–680)
- Hilderic, King (672)
- Paul, King (672–673)
- Erwig, King (680–687)
- Egica, King (687–702)
- Suniefred, King (693)
- Wittiza, King (694–710)

=== Europe: West ===
- Champagne (complete list) –

- Vintronus, Duke (?)
- Drogo, Duke (690–708)

- Frisian Kingdom (complete list) –

- Audulf, conjectured lord (c. 600)
- Adgillus I, King (?–680)
- Redbad, King (678–719)

- County of Paris (complete list) –

- Saint Warinus, Count (?–678)

- County of Poitou (complete list) –

- Saint Warinus, Count (638–677)

Franks

- Frankish Empire –

- Kings (complete list) –

- Theudebert II, King (595–612)
- Theuderic II, King (612–613)
- Sigebert II, King (613)
- Chilperic I, King (561–584)
- Chlothar II the Great, King (584–623)
- Dagobert I, King (623–634)
- Charibert II, King (629–632)
- Chilperic, King (632)
- Sigebert III, King (634–656)
- Childebert the Adopted, King (656–661)
- Clovis II, King (639–657)
- Chlothar III, King (657–673)
- Childeric II, King (662–675)
- Theuderic III, King (675–691)
- Dagobert II, King (675–679)
- Clovis IV, King (691–695)
- Childebert III, King (695–711)

- Mayors of the Palace (complete list) –

- Pepin I, Mayor of the Palace (623–629, 639–640)
- Adalgisel, Mayor of the Palace (629–639)
- Otto, Mayor of the Palace (640–642/643)
- Grimoald the Elder, Mayor of the Palace (642/643–656)
- Wulfoald, Mayor of the Palace (656–680)
- Pepin II of Herstal

- Mayor of the Palace (680–714)
- Duke and Prince of the Franks (687–714)

- Austrasia of the Franks (complete list) –

- Theudebert II, King (595–612)
- Theuderic II, King (612–613)
- Sigebert II, King (613)
- Chlothar II, King (613–623)
- Dagobert I, King (623–634)
- Sigebert III, King (634–656/660)
- Childebert the Adopted, King (656–661)
- Chlothar III, King (661–662)
- Childeric II, King (662–675)
- Clovis III, King (675–676)
- Theuderic III, King (679–691)
- Clovis IV, King (691–695)
- Childebert III, King (695–711)

- Neustria of the Franks (complete list) –

- Clotaire II, King (584–629)
- Dagobert I, King ((634–639)
- Clovis II, King ((639–655)
- Chlothar III, King (655–673)
- Theuderic III, King (673)
- Childeric II, King ((673–675)
- Theuderic III, King ((675–691)
- Clovis IV, King (691–695)
- Childebert III, King (695–711)

- Kingdom of Burgundy (complete list) -

- Theuderic II (595–613), also King of Austrasia
- Sigebert II (613), also King of Austrasia

- Aquitaine (complete list) –

- Chram, Duke (555–560)
- Desiderius, Duke (583–587)
- Bladast, Duke (583–587)
- Gundoald, usurper King (584/585)
- Austrovald, Duke (587–589)
- Sereus, Duke (589–592)
- Charibert II, King (629–632)
- Chilperic, King (632)
- Boggis, Duke (c.632–660)
- Felix, Duke (c.660–670)
- Lupus I, Duke (c.670–676)
- Odo the Great, Duke (c.688–c.735)

=== Eurasia: Caucasus ===
- Kingdom of Abkhazia (complete list) –

- Phinictios, King (c.580–610)
- Barnucius, King (c.610–640)
- Demetrius I, King (c.640–660)
- Theodosius I, King (c.660–680)
- Constantine I, King (c.680–710)

- Arminiya (complete list) –

- Muhammad ibn Marwan, Emir (c.695–705)

- Principality of Iberia (complete list) –

- Guaram I, Prince (588–c.590)
- Stephen I, Prince (c.590–627)
- Adarnase I, Prince (627–637/642)
- Stephen II, Prince (637/642–c.650)
- Adarnase II, Prince (c.650–684)
- Guaram II, Prince (684–c.693)
- Guaram III, Prince (c.693–c.748)

- First Kingdom of Kakheti (complete list) –

- Adarnase I, Prince (c.580–637)
- Stephanus I, also prince of Iberia, Prince (637–650)
- Adarnase II, prince of Iberia, Prince (650–684)
- Stephanus II, Prince (685–736)

== See also ==
- List of political entities in the 7th century
