= Dappula I =

Dappula I පළමුවන දප්පුල

King of Anuradhapura and Ruhuna
- Reign: 659 (661 – 664)
- Predecessor: Kassapa II
- Successor: Dathopa Tissa II
- House: Okkaka Clan
- Dynasty: House of Lambakanna
- Religion: Theravada Budddhism

Dappula I (Sinhala: පළමුවන දප්පුල) was a King of the Anuradhapura Kingdom who briefly held the throne in 659 AD before ruling the Kingdom of Rohana as an independent sovereign. He is a significant figure in Sri Lankan history for consolidating the southern province as a bastion of Sinhalese power during a period of foreign mercenary invasions in the north.

== Lineage and Rohana Connection ==
Dappula’s rise was the result of a strategic alliance between the northern royal house and the emerging local rulers of the south. He was the son of a high-ranking prince named Mahathissa of Rohana (Okkaka Clan) and a princess Sanghasiva who was the sister of kings Aggabodhi III and Kassapa II. During the mid-7th century, Rohana had become a semi-autonomous region led by a lineage of "local rulers" who provided refuge to the royal family during the civil wars against Dathopa Tissa I. Dappula was the most prominent representative of this southern aristocracy, combining military might with legitimate royal blood.

== Brief Reign in Anuradhapura (659 AD) ==
Following the death of Kassapa II, the kingdom faced a leadership vacuum. The royal ministers invited Dappula to take the throne at Anuradhapura to prevent another cycle of mercenary-backed usurpers. His reign, however, lasted only seven days. Hatthadatha (later Hatthadatha I), supported by a large force of Tamil mercenaries, launched a lightning strike on the capital. Dappula, choosing to preserve his forces rather than engage in a futile siege, retreated to the southern provinces.

== Rule in Rohana and Legacy ==
After his retreat, Dappula I established a stable and prosperous administration in Rohana. He is credited with several major contributions to the region:

Religious Patronage: He built the Kataragama Viharaya and established several other monasteries in the south to promote the Buddhist faith away from the war-torn north.

Administrative Independence: His rule turned Ruhuna into a permanent secondary seat of power in Sri Lanka, which would eventually serve as the staging ground for the reunification of the island by future kings like Vijayabahu the Great. He was eventually succeeded in the south by his sons, while the north remained under the control of the faction supported by foreign mercenaries until the return of Manavamma.

== See also ==
- List of Sri Lankan monarchs
- History of Sri Lanka

Dappula I House of Moriya Born: ? ? Died: ? ?
Regnal titles
Preceded by Kassapa II	King of Anuradhapura; 661–664	Succeeded by Dathopa Tissa II
