= Jettha Tissa III =

- King of Anuradhapura
- Reign: 628-629(623–624)
- Predecessor: Aggabodhi III
- Successor: Aggabodhi III
- House: Sangha Tissa
- Dynasty: House of Moriya ?
- Father: Sangha Tissa II
- Religion: Theravada Buddhism

Jettha Tissa III (Sinhala: තෙවන ජෙට්ඨතිස්ස) was a King of the Anuradhapura Kingdom in the 7th century. He was the son of Sangha Tissa II and is best known for his fierce resistance against the faction of Aggabodhi III and his dramatic death on the battlefield in 629 AD.

== Background and Exile ==
Jettha Tissa's life was shaped by the political turmoil following the death of Aggabodhi II. After his father, Sanghatissa II, was deposed and beheaded by the usurper Moggallana III, Jettha Tissa fled to the rugged terrain of Malaya Rata. During his exile, he lived among the mountain tribes and provincial leaders, building a loyal power base while the capital was ruled first by Moggallana III and then by Silameghavanna.

== Accession (628 AD) ==
Upon the death of Silameghavanna, the throne passed to his son, Aggabodhi III. Seizing the opportunity afforded by the transition of power, Jettha Tissa mobilized his mountain army at Arittha Pabbata (Ritigala). He successfully invaded the capital, driving Aggabodhi III into exile in South India. Jettha Tissa III then assumed the throne, attempting to restore his father's lineage to the sovereignty of Anuradhapura.

== The Return of Aggabodhi III and Death ==
Aggabodhi III returned from India within months, supported by a large force of Tamil mercenaries. Jettha Tissa led his army out to meet the invaders in a final, decisive engagement. As the battle turned against him and his troops began to retreat, Jettha Tissa reportedly refused to flee. According to the Culavamsa, he gave a final message to his queen, instructing her to enter a nunnery, and then committed ritual suicide by cutting his own throat while still mounted on his war elephant. His death marked the restoration of Aggabodhi III, though it also signaled the start of decades of civil strife between the two rival branches of the royal family.

== Legacy ==
Jettha Tissa III is often portrayed in Sri Lankan history as a tragic figure of the "Lambakanna-Moriya" civil wars. His suicide is cited as an example of the high code of honor held by ancient Sinhalese royalty, preferring death to the humiliation of capture by foreign-backed rivals. His struggle was later continued by his relative, Dathopa Tissa I.

== See also ==
- List of Sri Lankan monarchs
- History of Sri Lanka

Jettha Tissa III House of Moriya Born: ? ? Died: ? ?
Regnal titles
Preceded by Aggabodhi III	King of Anuradhapura; 623–624	Succeeded by Aggabodhi III
