= Velakkara revolt =

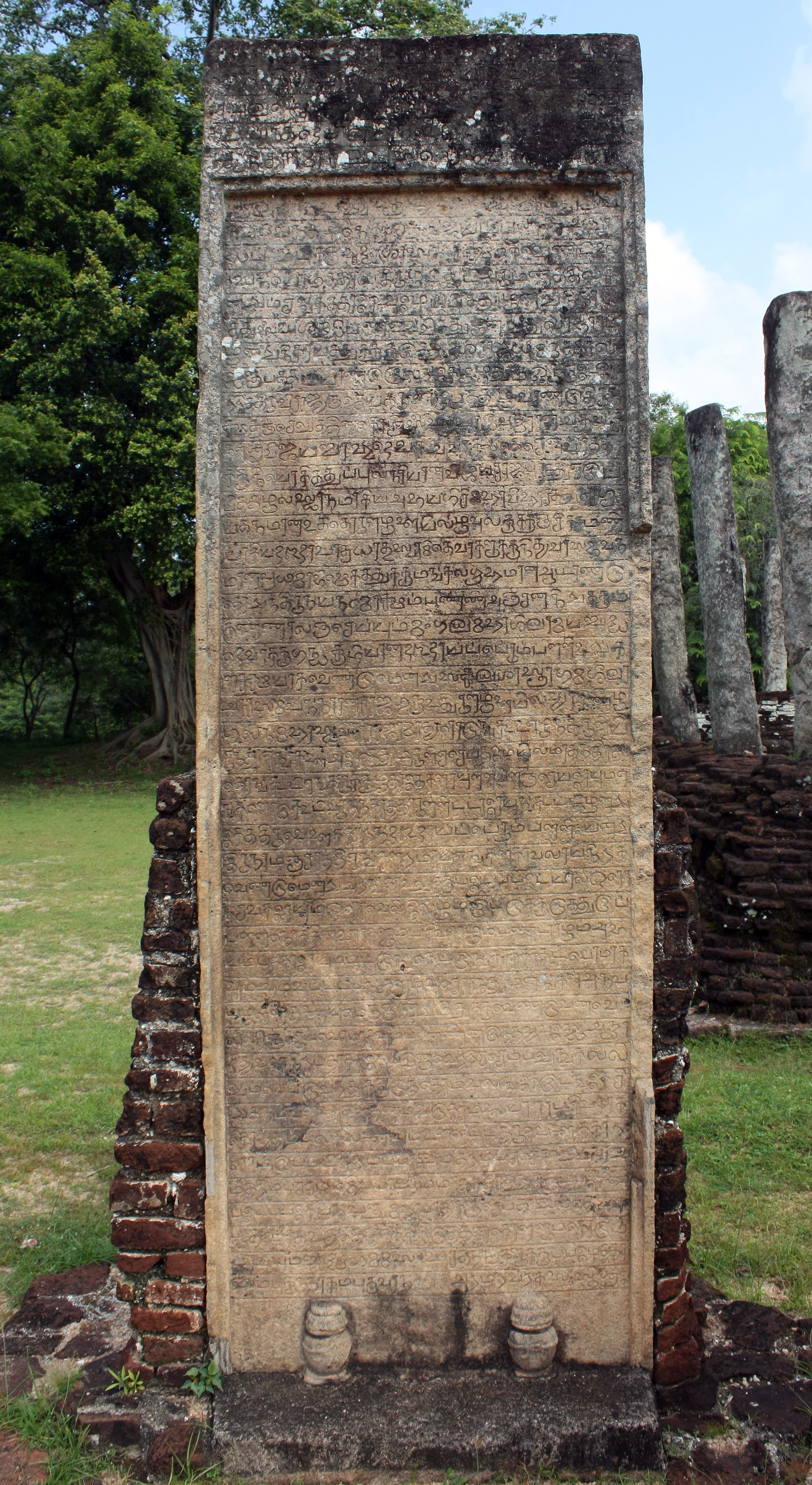
Polonnaruwa Velaikkara slab Tamil inscription

Velakkara revolt was a mutiny by the Velakkara division of the territorial army of the Sinhalese monarch Vijayabahu I of Polonnaruwa in the year 1084 CE.

== The Revolt ==
Around 1084 CE, another quarrel with the Chola kingdom erupted when some ambassadors of Vijayabahu sent to West Chalukya were harassed by them. Vijayabahu declared another war against the Chola Empire, and the Velakkaras were ordered by Vijayabahu to fight against them. The Velakkaras refused to fight against their Tamil kinsmen, and started a revolt against Vijayabahu.

They killed the royal guards and burnt down the palace. Vijayabahu fled to Wakirigala, but returned afterwards to recapture Polonnaruwa. The rebel leaders were captured and executed, and the Velakkaras set up a Tamil inscription in which they promised to protect the Relic of the tooth of the Buddha.
