= Unhanagara Hatthadatha =

King of Anuradhapura in 691

Unhanagara Hatthadatha Sirimannage
- King of Anuradhapura
- Reign: 691(684)
- Predecessor: Aggabodhi IV
- Successor: Manavanna
- Dynasty: House of Moriya
- Religion: Buddhism

Unhanagara Hatthadatha Sirimannage was a king of Anuradhapura in 691(684). Despite his title, he was more of a good Buddhist monarch, with real power being held by a Tamil minister named Poththakutta who also commanded a significant number of Tamil mercenaries garrisoned in the city. He was placed in succession to deceased Aggabodhi IV and his reign caused further anarchy and discontent among the Buddhist Sinhalese majority of Anuradhapura and nearby.

He was defeated by Manavanna, a son of Kassapa II, who with assistance from Narasimhavarman II of the Pallavas, resolved the Moriya-Lambakanna conflict and restored the rule of the Lambakanna dynasty in Anuradhapura.

== See also ==
- List of Sri Lankan monarchs
- History of Sri Lanka

Unhanagara Hatthadatha House of Moriya Born: ? ? Died: ? ?
Regnal titles
| Preceded by Aggabodhi IV | King of Anuradhapura; 691–691 | Succeeded by Manavanna |
