= Aggabodhi III =

- King of Anuradhapura
- Reign: 628( 623); 629-641; 641?-644?(624 – 640)
- Predecessor: Silameghavanna; Jettha Tissa III
- Successor: Jettha Tissa III; Dathopa Tissa I
- House: Silameghavanna
- Dynasty: House of Lambakanna ?
- Father: Silameghavanna
- Religion: Theravada Buddhism

Aggabodhi III (Sinhala: තුන්වන අග්බෝ), also known as Sirisangabo, was a monarch of the Anuradhapura Kingdom who reigned during a period of extreme political instability in the 7th century. His rule, spanning intermittently from 628 AD to 644 AD, is historically significant as the beginning of a "Dark Era" characterized by perpetual civil war and the first large-scale dependency on foreign mercenary armies.

== Accession and First Exile (628–629 AD) ==
Aggabodhi III was the son of King Silameghavanna. He ascended the throne at a young age and immediately appointed his younger brother, Mana, as the Uparaja (Sub-king), placing him in charge of the Southern Province (Dakkhinadesa). His initial reign lasted only a few months before he was challenged by Jettha Tissa III, the son of the late King Sangha Tissa II. Following a military defeat, Aggabodhi III was forced to flee to South India for the first time.

== Restoration and the Twelve-Year Reign ==
In 629 AD, Aggabodhi III returned from India with a large army of Tamil mercenaries. He decisively defeated Jettha Tissa III, who committed suicide on the battlefield. This victory restored Aggabodhi to the throne, and for the next twelve years, the kingdom experienced a period of relative, albeit fragile, peace.

== The Crisis of the 12th Regnal Year (c. 641 AD) ==
The stability of Aggabodhi III’s reign collapsed in his 12th year due to a specific sequence of internal betrayals and foreign invasions:

The Sin of Prince Mana: While King Aggabodhi at power king's brother, prince Mana was found guilty of misconduct with the queen.

The Execution of Mana: Despite being the King's brother, the ministers and high officials of the court, fearing the destabilization of the law, took matters into their own hands and executed Prince Mana. The younger brother Prince Kasspa was appointed in prince Mana's place.

Aggabodhi’s Weakened Position: The execution of his brother and chief military commander left the King politically isolated and his army in disarray.

The Invasion of Dathopa Tissa I: Sensing this vulnerability, a general named Dathasiva (a relative of the late Jettha Tissa III) launched an invasion from India with a massive force of Tamil mercenaries.

The Battle of Tintini: Dathasiva established a camp at the village of Tintini. Aggabodhi III marched to meet him but was decisively defeated.

Second Flight to India: Following this defeat in his 12th regnal year, Aggabodhi III was once again forced to flee to South India to raise a new army.He again seek refuge again from them with only his necklace.

== The Final Conflict and Religious Desecration ==
Upon returning from his second exile, Aggabodhi III entered a "ping-pong" style civil war with Dathopa Tissa I (Dathasiva). Between 639 and 644 AD, the throne changed hands so frequently that chronicles describe it as a time of total confusion.

Looting of the Stupas: To pay their respective mercenary armies, both Aggabodhi III and Dathopa Tissa I stripped the gold and gems from the Thuparamaya and Dakkhina Thupa relic chambers.

Regret and Penance: The Culavamsa notes that Aggabodhi III later expressed deep regret for these acts of desecration and attempted to perform meritorious deeds to atone for the sacrilege. He tried to rebuild Dakkina Thupa by spending 1000 massa during his time.

== Death and Succession ==
Unable to hold the capital against Dathopa Tissa’s persistent attacks, Aggabodhi III eventually retreated to the southern province of Ruhuna. He died there in 644 AD in the 16th year of his intermittent reign. He was succeeded by his brother, Kassapa II, who eventually managed to defeat Dathopa Tissa.

== See also ==
- List of Sri Lankan monarchs
- History of Sri Lanka

Aggabodhi III House of Moriya Born: ? ? Died: ? ?
Regnal titles
Preceded by Silameghavanna	King of Anuradhapura; 623–623	Succeeded by Jettha Tissa III
Preceded by Jettha Tissa III	King of Anuradhapura; 624–640	Succeeded by Dathopa Tissa I
