= Kassapa II =

- King of Anuradhapura
- Reign: 650 – 659 (652- 661)
- Predecessor: Dathopa Tissa I
- Successor: Dappula I
- House: Silameghavanna
- Dynasty: House of Lambakanna
- Religion: Theravada Buddhism

Kassapa II (Sinhala: දෙවන කස්සප) was a monarch of the Anuradhapura Kingdom who reigned from 650 AD to 659 AD. He was the younger brother of Aggabodhi III and is credited with finally ending the decade-long civil war against the faction of Dathopa Tissa I, restoring a brief period of unity to the island.

== Rise to Power and the Defeat of Dathopa Tissa ==
Kassapa II served as a primary military commander under his brother, Aggabodhi III. Following Aggabodhi's death in 644 AD in Ruhuna, Kassapa took up the mantle of the Lambakanna faction to oppose the reigning Dathopa Tissa I. In 650 AD, Kassapa II led a decisive military campaign against Anuradhapura. In a fierce battle, he defeated and killed Dathopa Tissa I, who had been supported by South Indian mercenaries. This victory allowed Kassapa II to be consecrated as the sole ruler of Sri Lanka, ending the "ping-pong" era of shifting kings.

== Reign and Governance ==
Kassapa II's reign was marked by efforts to stabilize the kingdom after years of destruction:

Religious Restoration: Unlike his predecessors who had looted the stupas to pay for war, Kassapa II sought to make amends. He is recorded to have performed numerous meritorious acts to support the Buddhist Sangha and restore the dignity of the monasteries.

Foreign Policy: He remained wary of further South Indian invasions and focused on strengthening the internal defenses of the northern plains.

Internal Administration: He maintained a strong hold over the administrative centers, ensuring that the irrigation systems, which had been neglected during the civil wars, were partially rehabilitated to prevent famine.

== The Succession Crisis ==
Despite his success in unifying the kingdom, Kassapa II faced a dilemma regarding his successor. He had several sons, but his eldest son, Manaka (Future Manavanna), was considered too young or politically vulnerable at the time of his father's declining health. As Kassapa II approached death, he entrusted the kingdom and the care of his children to his nephew (his sister's son), Mana, whom he appointed as the regent. This decision was intended to maintain stability, but it eventually led to further dynastic conflict.

== Death and Legacy ==
Kassapa II died in 659 AD after a nine-year reign. He is remembered in the Culavamsa as a king who brought a necessary end to a period of unprecedented sacrilege and chaos. However, his death triggered a new power struggle, as his son Manavamma eventually fled to the Pallava court in India, eventually returning years later to found a new, more stable dynasty.

== See also ==
- List of Sri Lankan monarchs
- History of Sri Lanka

Kassapa II House of Moriya Born: ? ? Died: ? ?
Regnal titles
Preceded by Dathopa Tissa I	King of Anuradhapura; 650–659	Succeeded by Dappula I
