= Chattagahaka Jantu =

Chattagahaka Jantu ඡත්තගාහක ජන්තු
- King of Anuradhapura
- Reign: 434 – 435
- Predecessor: Soththisena
- Successor: Mittasena
- Dynasty: House of Lambakanna I

Chattagahaka Jantu (Sinhala: ඡත්තගාහක ජන්තු), (a.k.a. Chhattagahaka) was king of Anuradhapura for about one year from 434 AD to 435 AD. He succeeded his wife's stepbrother Soththisena and was succeeded by Mittasena.

He was from the House of Lambakanna I. Prince Jantu had the office of Chattagahaka before he became king. He was the husband of Princess Sanghā, the daughter of King Mahānāma (410-432). He succeeded his wife's step brother Soththisena as the king of Anuradhapura. He was succeeded by Mittasena. The Chief Minister wanted to ascend the throne himself, but enthroned Mittasena as his puppet ruler.

== See also ==
- List of Sri Lankan monarchs
- History of Sri Lanka

Chattagahaka Jantu House of Lambakanna I Born: ? ? Died: ? ?
Regnal titles
Preceded by Soththisena	King of Anuradhapura; 434–435	Succeeded by Mittasena
