= Mittasena =

Mittasena මිත්තසේන
- King of Anuradhapura
- Reign: 435 – 436
- Predecessor: Chattagahaka Jantu
- Successor: Pandu
- Dynasty: House of Lambakanna I

Mittasena (Sinhala: මිත්තසේන), (or Mitta Sena or Karalsora) was King of Anuradhapura in the 5th century, whose reign lasted from 435 to 436. He succeeded Chattagahaka Jantu as King of Anuradhapura. During his reign, the kingdom was invaded by Pandu of The Six Dravidians. He was the last king of the Lambakanna dynasty.

Mittasena had a reputation as a plunderer of crops from farmers. King Chattagahaka Jantu's Chief Minister orchestrated Mittasena's accession. The Chief Minister wanted to ascend the throne himself, but enthroned Mittasena as his puppet ruler. Mittasena was kept out of the sight of the public even though it was the custom of kings to participate in festive events. The Chief Minister kept the administration of the country in his hands.^{[1]}

King Mittasena was said to be devoted to acts of piety. People initially tolerated the unusual absence of their king from public events. Then the people decided that they wanted to see if the king actually existed. So they besieged the palace and demanded to see their king. The Chief Minister had to allow Mittasena to appear in public on the State elephant.

After only one year from his accession, six Tamil chiefs invaded Sri Lanka with an army. The invading forces were headed by Pandu, a Pandyan from southern India. King Mittasena was defeated and slain on the battlefield. He was succeeded by King Pandu of The Six Dravidians.

== See also ==
- List of Sri Lankan monarchs
- History of Sri Lanka

Mittasena House of Lambakanna I Born: ? ?
Regnal titles
Preceded by Chattagahaka Jantu	King of Anuradhapura; 435–436	Succeeded by Pandu
