= The Six Dravidians =

Ancient Tamil rulers

- Country: Anuradhapura Kingdom
- Founded: 436
- Founder: Pandu
- Final ruler: Pithiya
- Titles: King of Anuradhapura
- Deposition: 452

The Six Dravidians were six Tamil rulers apparently from the Pandyan Dynasty who ruled the Anuradhapura Kingdom from 436 to 452 CE. They are said to be Buddhist, taking Buddhist epithets such as the 'servant of Buddha' and are known to have made several Buddhist donations.

== Background ==
Before the Six Dravidians had invaded the island, the Anuradhapura Kingdom was ruled by Mittasena (435-436).

== Rulers ==
=== Pandu ===
Pandu
- King of Anuradhapura
- Reign: 436–441
- Predecessor: Mittasena
- Successor: Parindu

Pandu was the first of the Six Dravidians. He was a Pandyan, in South India, who established foreign rule in Anuradhapura through a Pandyan invasion after killing the king Mittasena. He ruled from 436 to 441

=== Parindu ===
Parindu
- King of Anuradhapura
- Reign: 441–441
- Predecessor: Pandu
- Successor: Khudda Parinda
- Father: Pandu

Parindu, the son of Pandu, was the second of the Six Dravidians. He ruled for less than a year in 441.

=== Khudda Parinda ===
Khudda Parinda
- King of Anuradhapura
- Reign: 441–447
- Predecessor: Parindu
- Successor: Tiritara
- Father: Pandu

Khudda Parinda, the third of the Six Dravidians, reigned from 441 to 447. He was the younger brother of Parindu.

=== Tiritara ===
Tiritara
- King of Anuradhapura
- Reign: 447
- Predecessor: Khudda Parinda
- Successor: Dathiya
- Died: 447

Tiritara was the fourth of the Six Dravidians. He ruled for two months in 447.

=== Dathiya ===
Dathiya
- King of Anuradhapura
- Reign: 447–450
- Predecessor: Tiritara
- Successor: Pithiya

Dathiya was the fifth of the Six Dravidians, who ruled for two years from 447 to 450.

=== Pithiya ===
Pithiya
- King of Anuradhapura
- Reign: 450–452
- Predecessor: Dathiya
- Successor: Dhatusena

Pithiya was the last of the Six Dravidians, who ruled for two years from 450 to 452. He was defeated by Dhatusena.

== See also ==
- List of Sri Lankan monarchs
- History of Sri Lanka
- Mahavamsa
