= List of Sri Lankan monarchs =

King of the Sinhala Kingdom
- සිංහල රාජ්‍යයේ රජු
- Royal and Civil Standard of Sri Vikrama Rajasinha

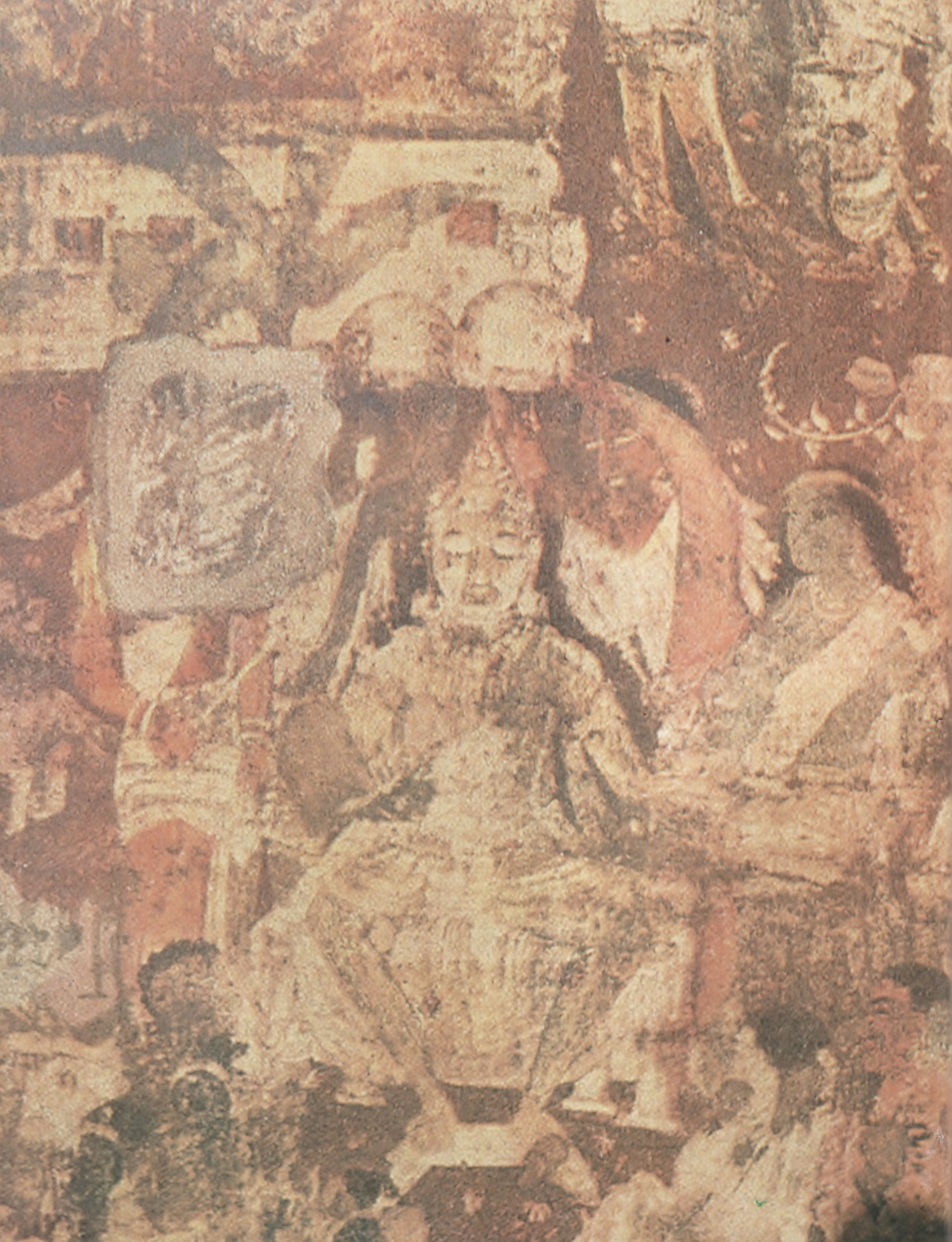
- Founder of the Sinhala Kingdom; Vijaya c. 543 – c. 505 BCE

Details
- Style: His/Her Majesty
- First monarch: Vijaya I
- Last monarch: Dharmapala (1597); Sri Vikrama Rajasinha (1815)
- Formed: 543 BCE
- Abolished: 1597 (Continued through the Kandyan monarchy until 1815)
- Residences: Tambapanni, Anuradhapura, Polonnaruwa, Dambadeniya, Yapahuwa, Kurunegala, Gampola, Raigama, Kotte, Kandy
- Pretender: Gongalegoda Banda

The monarchs of Sri Lanka, (Note: The name Sri Lanka refers to the modern-day republic.) also referred to as the Sinhalese monarchy, were the heads of state and rulers of the Sinhala Kingdoms located in present-day Sri Lanka, from 543 BCE (according to chronicles) until its abolition in 1815 CE.

The Sinhalese monarchy began with the settlement of North Indian Indo-Aryan speaking immigrants to the island of Sri Lanka. The Landing of Vijaya (as described in the traditional early chronicles of the island, the Dipavamsa and Mahavamsa) recounts the date of the establishment of the first Sinhalese Kingdom in 543 BCE (Note: This is the most common date.) when Indian prince Prince Vijaya (543–505 BCE) and 700 of his followers arrived in Sri Lanka, establishing the Kingdom of Tambapanni. In Sinhalese mythology, Prince Vijaya and followers are told to be the progenitors of the Sinhalese people. However, according to the story in the Divyavadana, the immigrants were probably not led by a scion of a royal house in India, as told in the romantic legend, but rather may have been groups of adventurous and pioneering merchants exploring new lands. On the other hand, other historians such as G.C. Mendis have suggested that the Vijaya story is a myth and has no historical basis.

The Sinhala Kingdoms comprised the political states of the Sinhalese people and their ancestors; it existed as a series of successive kingdoms known by the city in which the administrative centre of the kingdom was located. These are, in chronological order: the kingdoms of Tambapanni, Upatissa Nuwara, Anuradhapura, Polonnaruwa, Dambadeniya, Gampola, Kotte, Raigama, Sitawaka and Kandy. The last Sinhala Kingdom came to an end in 1815 with Sri Vikrama Rajasinha of Kandy after generations of European colonial influences and upheaval in the royal court.

During the two millennia of Sinhalese kingdoms, other political entities also existed on the island, including the Jaffna Kingdom, the Vanni chieftaincies and the Portuguese and Dutch colonies. These political entities are considered separate from the Sinhala Kingdoms. A separate page lists the monarchs of the Jaffna Kingdom.

During the reign of Devanampiya Tissa (307–267 BCE), Buddhism was introduced to the island by Ashoka of India. By the time of Kithsirimevan (304–332 CE), Sudatta, the subking of Kalinga and Hemamala brought the Tooth Relic of the Buddha to Sri Lanka due to unrest in the country. Kithsirimevan carried it in procession and placed the relic in a mansion named Datadhatughara. He ordered this procession to be held annually, and this is still done as a tradition in the country to this day. The Tooth Relic of the Buddha soon became one of the most sacred objects in the country and a symbol of kingship. The person who was in possession of the Tooth Relic would thereafter be considered the rightful ruler of the country.

The role of the monarch was absolute. The monarch was head of state but would be aided with high level officials and a board of ministers. The monarch was later seen as the supreme ruler throughout the island, even at times when they did not have absolute control over it. However, the earliest inscriptions dating from the 3rd to 2nd century BCE suggest that the island was divided into several regional principalities and chieftaincies until the wars of unification fought by King Dutugamunu. These early kings sought to establish control over the whole island, though in reality this was more of an aspiration. However periods of effective control over the whole island did exist from time to time. The monarch also held judicial power and influence. Judicial customs, traditions and moral principles based on Buddhism were used as the bases of law. The laws and legal measures were proclaimed by the monarch, and were to be followed by the justice administration. However the monarch was the final judge in legal disputes, and all cases against members of the royal family and high dignitaries of the state were judged by them, although this power was to be exercised with care and after consulting with their advisers.

This article is a list of monarchs that have reigned over the nine successive kingdoms of the Sinhalese monarchy. It is based on the traditional list of monarchs as recorded in the chronicles of the island, in particular the Mahavamsa and Rajavaliya. It is not a list of ethnically Sinhalese monarchs as it contains all rulers of the Sinhalese kingdoms, both Sinhalese and foreign. Each monarch belongs to one of nine royal houses (Vijaya, Lambakanna I, Moriya, Lambakanna II, Vijayabahu, Kalinga, Siri Sanga Bo, Dinajara and Nayaks (Note: The Nayaks were not an ethnically Sinhalese royal house, nonetheless are considered a part of the Sinhalese monarchy.)), and follows a tradition of regnal names that span the entirety of the monarchy. For example, Vijayabahu was used 7 times over multiple kingdoms and multiple royal houses over a period of 500 years and there is no overlap of names, Vijayabahu I, II, III, IV, V, VI, VII. The same is true for Aggabodhi, Bhuvanaikabahu, Kassapa, Mahinda, Parakramabahu and others.

== Notes ==
This list should be used with the following factors kept in mind. Firstly, the dates provided for the earliest monarchs are difficult to objectively verify; those particularly difficult to know have been denoted with a (?) mark. The date August 20, 1200 is the earliest known fixed date in Sri Lankan history, which was for the coronation of Sahassa Malla.

Another thing to be noted is that several monarchs had usurped the throne of Lanka including Sinhalese monarchs such as Anikanga, Chodaganga, Sri Vallabha of Polonnaruwa and Mahinda VI. The usurpers may have received support from rival kingdoms such as the Cholas.

=== Note on chronology ===
It should be borne in mind that there is controversy about the base date of the Buddhist Era, with dates between the 6th century BCE and 4th century BCE being advanced as the date of the parinibbana of the Buddha. As Wilhelm Geiger pointed out, the Dipawamsa and Mahawansa are the primary sources for ancient South Asian chronology; they date the consecration (abhisheka) of Ashoka (268 BCE according to modern scholarship) to 218 years after the parinibbana. Chandragupta Maurya ascended the throne 56 years prior to this, or 162 years after the parinibbana. The approximate date of Chandragupta's ascension is within two years of 321 BCE (from Megasthenes). Hence the approximate date according to the Mahavamsa of the parinibbana is between 485 and 481 BCE.

According to Geiger, the difference between the two reckonings seems to have occurred at sometime between the reigns of Udaya III (946–954 or 1007–1015) and Pârakkama Pandya (c. 1046–1048), when there was considerable unrest in the country. However, mention is made of an embassy sent to China by Cha-cha Mo-ho-nan in 428. The name may correspond to 'Raja (King) Mahanama', who (by the traditional chronology) reigned about this time.

Furthermore, the traveller-monk Xuanzang, who attempted to visit Sri Lanka about 642, was told by Sri Lankan monks (possibly at Kanchipuram) that there was trouble in the kingdom, so he desisted; this accords with the period of struggle for the throne between Aggabodhi III Sirisanghabo, Jettha Tissa III and Dathopa Tissa I Hatthadpath in 632–643.

Recent indological research has indicated that the Parinibbana of the Buddha may be even later than previously supposed. A majority of the scholars at a symposium held in 1988 in Göttingen regarding the problem were inclined towards a date of 440–360 BCE. However, the Theravada Buddhist canon was first put into writing in Sri Lanka, and the chronology of the following list is based on the traditional Therevada/Sri Lankan system, which is based on a parinibbana date of 543 BCE, sixty years earlier than the Mahayana calendar. Dates after c. 1048 are synchronous.

The Mahavamsa was complied nearly a millennium after the purported date of Vijaya's arrival, and the traditional chronology and relationships of the earliest kings have been called into question by some scholars. Referring to the period following Devanampiya Tissa's rule, archaeologist W. D. J. Benilie Priyanka Emmanuel states:

"The traditional chronology for this period is manifestly incredible; for, according to it, the reigns of five brothers are spread over a period of 102 years, and that after their father is said to have himself ruled for sixty years. The round figure of ten years assigned to four of the rulers also makes the chronology open to suspicion. The historicity of one of these successors of Devanampiya Tissa, however, is proved by epigraphical records, and we have to conclude either that these rulers were contemporary, exercising authority in different regions of the Island, or that the relationship they bore to each other, as given in the chronicles, is wrong."

== Kingdom of Tambapanni (543–437 BCE) ==
=== House of Vijaya (543–437 BCE) ===
Portrait	Name	Birth	Death	King from	King until	Marriages	Claim
Vijaya	Vijaya	? Sinhapura son of Sinhabahu, and Sinhasivali	505 BCE; Tambapanni	543 BCE	505 BCE	Kuveni two children Pandu Princess	Founded Kingdom; Marriage to Kuveni
	Upatissa (regent)	-	-	505 BCE	504 BCE		Prince Vijaya's Chief Minister
	Panduvasdeva	-	-	504 BCE	474 BCE		Nephew of Vijaya
	Abhaya	-	454 BCE	474 BCE	454 BCE		Son of Panduvasdeva
	Tissa (regent)	-	-	454 BCE	437 BCE		Younger brother of Abhaya

== Anuradhapura Kingdom (437 BCE–1017 CE) ==
=== House of Vijaya (437–237 BCE) ===
Portrait	Name	Birth	Death	King from	King until	Relationship with predecessor(s)
	Pandukabhaya	474 BCE	367 BCE	437 BCE	367 BCE	Grandson of Panduvasudeva; Nephew of Abhaya and Tissa
	Mutasiva	-	307 BCE	367 BCE	307 BCE	Son of Pandukabhaya
	Devanampiya Tissa	-	267 BCE	307 BCE	267 BCE	Son of Mutasiva
	Uttiya	-	-	267 BCE	257 BCE	Son of Mutasiva
	Mahasiva	-	-	257 BCE	247 BCE	Son of Mutasiva
	Suratissa	-	237 BCE	247 BCE	237 BCE	Son of Mutasiva

=== Sena and Guttika (237–215 BCE) ===
Portrait	Name	Birth	Death	King from	King until	Claim
	Sena and Guttika	-	-	237 BCE	215 BCE	Defeated Suratissa in battle

=== House of Vijaya (215–205 BCE) ===
Portrait	Name	Birth	Death	King from	King until	Relationship with predecessor(s)
	Asela	? Son of Mutasiva	205 BCE; Anuradhapura	215 BCE	205 BCE	Son of Mutasiva

=== Elara (205–161 BCE) ===
Portrait	Name	Birth	Death	King from	King until	Claim
Elara	Elara	235 BCE; Chola Empire	161 BCE; Anuradhapura	205 BCE	161 BCE	Defeated Asela in battle

=== House of Vijaya (161–103 BCE) ===
Portrait	Name	Birth	Death	King from	King until	Relationship with predecessor(s)
	Dutugamunu the Great (a.k.a. Duṭṭha Gāmaṇi or Dutugemunu or Duttagamini Abaya)	-	-	161 BCE	137 BCE	*Defeated Elara; *Eldest son of Kavan Tissa; *Originally the ruler of Ruhuna
	Saddhā Tissa	-	-	137 BCE	119 BCE	*Brother of Dutugemunu
	Thūlathana (Tulna)	-	-	119 BCE	119 BCE	*Second son of Saddha Tissa
	Lañja Tissa	-	-	119 BCE	109 BCE	*Older brother of Thullattana; *Oldest son of Saddha Tissa
	Khallāṭa Nāga (Kalunna)	-	-	109 BCE	103 BCE	*Brother of Lanja Tissa; *Third son of Saddha Tissa
	Vaṭṭagāmaṇi Abhaya (a.k.a. Valagambahu I) (Walagamba)	-	-	103 BCE	103 BCE	*Fourth son of Saddha Tissa

=== The Five Dravidans (103–89 BCE) ===
Portrait	Name	Birth	Death	King from	King until	Relationship with predecessor(s)
	Pulahatta	-	-	103 BCE	100 BCE	*Tamil Chief
	Bahiya	-	-	100 BCE	98 BCE	*Chief Minister of Pulahatha
	Panya Mara	-	-	98 BCE	91 BCE	*Prime Minister of Bahiya
	Pilaya Mara	-	-	91 BCE	90 BCE	*Chief Minister of Panayamara
	Dathika	-	-	90 BCE	89 BCE	*Chief Minister of Pilayamara

=== House of Vijaya (89 BCE – 67 CE) ===
Portrait	Name	Birth	Death	King from	King until	Relationship with predecessor(s)
	Vattagamani Abhaya (a.k.a. Valagambahu I) (Walagamba)	-	-	89 BCE	77 BCE	*Fourth son of Saddha Tissa
	Mahakuli Mahatissa (Maha Cula Maha Tissa)	-	-	77 BCE	63 BCE	*Son of Khallatanaga; *Nephew and adopted son of Valagambahu I
	Chora Naga (Mahanaga)	-	-	63 BCE	51 BCE	*Son of Valagambahu I *Cousin of Mahakuli Mahatissa
	Kuda Tissa	-	-	51 BCE	48 BCE	*Son of Mahakuli Mahatissa
	Siva I	-	-	48 BCE	48 BCE	
	Vatuka	-	-	48 BCE	48 BCE	
	Darubhatika Tissa	-	-	48 BCE	48 BCE	
	Niliya	-	-	48 BCE	48 BCE	
	Anula	-	-	48 BCE	44 BCE	*Widow of Chora Naga and Kuda Tissa
	Kutakanna Tissa	-	-	44 BCE	22 BCE	*Brother of Kuda Tissa; *Second son of Mahakuli Mahatissa
	Bhatika Abhaya	-	-	22 BCE	7 CE	*Son of Kuttakanna Tissa
	Mahadathika Mahanaga	-	-	7	19	*Brother of Bhatika Abhaya
	Amandagamani Abhaya	-	-	19	29	*Son of Mahadathika Mahanaga
	Kanirajanu Tissa	-	-	29	32	*Brother of Amandagamani Abhaya
	Chulabhaya	-	-	32	33	*Son of Amandagamani Abhaya
	Sivali	-	-	33	33	*Sister of Chulabhaya
	Interregnum	-	-	33	33	
	Ilanaga (Elunna)	-	-	33	43	*Nephew of Queen Sivali
	Chandamukha	-	-	43	52	*Son of Ilanaga
	Yassalalaka	-	-	52	60	*Younger brother of Candhamuka Siva
	Subharaja (a.k.a. Subha)	-	-	60	67	*The hall porter of King Yasalaka Tissa

=== House of Lambakanna I (67–429) ===
Portrait	Name	Birth	Death	King from	King until	Relationship with predecessor(s)
	Vasabha	-	-	67	111	*A member of the Lambakanna clan
	Vankanasika Tissa	-	-	111	114	*Son of Vasabha
	Gajabahu I	-	-	114	136	*Son of Vankanasika Tissa
	Mahallaka Naga	-	-	136	143	*Father-in-law of Gajabahu I
	Bhatika Tissa	-	-	143	167	*Son of Mahallaka Naga
	Kanittha Tissa	-	-	167	186	*Younger brother of Bhatika Tissa
	Cula Naga (a.k.a. Khujjanaga)	-	-	186	187	*Son of Kanitta Tissa
	Kuda Naga (a.k.a. Kunchanaga)	-	-	187	189	*Brother of Cula Naga
	Siri Naga I	-	-	189	209	*Brother-in-law of Kuda Naga
	Voharika Tissa (a.k.a. Vira Tissa & Voharikathissa)	-	-	209	231	*Son of Siri Naga I
	Abhaya Naga	-	-	231	240	*Brother of Voharaka Tissa
	Siri Naga II	-	-	240	242	*Son of Voharaka Tissa
	Vijaya Kumara	-	-	242	243	*Son of Siri Naga II
	Sangha Tissa I	-	-	243	247	*A Lambakanna
	Siri Sangha Bodhi I (a.k.a. Siri Sangabo)	-	-	247	249	*A Lambakanna
	Gothabhaya	-	-	249	262	*Minister of State; *A Lambakanna
	Jettha Tissa I (a.k.a. Detuthis I)	-	-	263	273	*Eldest son of Gothabhaya
	Mahasena	-	-	274	301	*Brother of Jettha Tissa; *Younger son of Gothabhaya
	Sirimeghavanna	-	-	301	328	*Son of Mahasena
	Jettha Tissa II	-	-	328	337	*Brother of Sirimeghavanna
	Buddhadasa	-	-	337	365	*Son of Jettha Tissa II
	Upatissa I	-	-	365	406	*Eldest son of Buddhadasa
	Mahanama	-	-	406	428	*Brother of Upatissa I
	Soththisena	-	-	428	428	*Mahanama's son born to a Tamil mother
	Chattagahaka Jantu (a.k.a. Chhattagahaka)	-	-	428	428	*Husband of Sangha; *Daughter of Mahanama by his Sinhala queen
	Mittasena	-	-	428	429	*A noted plunderer

=== The Six Dravidians (429–455) ===
Portrait	Name	Birth	Death	King from	King until	Relationship with predecessor(s)
	Pandu	-	-	429	434	*Pandyan Invader
	Parindu	-	-	434	437	*Son of Pandu
	Khudda Parinda	-	-	437	452	*Younger brother of Pandu
	Tiritara	-	-	452	452	*Fourth Tamil ruler
	Dathiya	-	-	452	455	*Fifth Tamil ruler
	Pithiya	-	-	455	455	*Sixth Tamil ruler

=== House of Moriya (455–691) ===
Portrait	Name	Birth	Death	King from	King until	Relationship with predecessor(s)
	Dhatusena	-	-	455	473	*Son of Sangha, the daughter of Mahanama; *Liberated Anuradhapura from 27 years of Pandyan rule
	Kashyapa I (the Usurper),(of Sigiriya)	-	-	479	497	*Son of King Dhatusena by a Pallava woman
	Moggallana I	-	-	497	515	*Son of Dhatusena; *Brother of Kasyapa
	Kumara Dhatusena	-	-	515	524	*Son of Mogallana
	Kittisena	-	-	524	524	*Son of Kumara Dhatusena
	Siva II	-	-	524	525	*Uncle of Kirti Sena
	Upatissa II	-	-	525	526	*Son-in-law of Kumara Dhatusena
	Silakala Ambosamanera	-	-	526	539	*A son-in-law of Upatissa, prince of Lambakanna stock
	Dathappabhuti	-	-	539	540	*Second son of Silakala
	Moggallana II	-	-	540	560	*Eldest brother of Dathappabhuti
	Kittisiri Meghavanna	-	-	560	561	*Son of Mogallana II
	Maha Naga	-	-	561	564	*Minister of War under King Dathapatissa
	Aggabodhi I	-	-	564	598	*Mother's brother's son and Sub-King of Mahanaga
	Aggabodhi II	-	-	598	608	*Nephew and son-in-law of Aggabodhi I
	Sangha Tissa II	-	-	608	608	*Brother and sword-bearer of Aggabodhi II
	Moggallana III	-	-	608	614	*Commander-in-chief during the reign of Aggabodhi II
	Silameghavanna	-	-	614	623	*King Mogallana's Sword-bearer
	Aggabodhi III	-	-	623	623	*Son of Silimeghavanna
	Jettha Tissa III	-	-	623	624	*Son of King Sangha Tissa
	Aggabodhi III (restored)	-	-	624	640	*Son of Silimeghavanna
	Dathopa Tissa I (Hatthadpatha)	-	-	640	652	*General of Jettha Tissa (Dathasiva)
	Kassapa II	-	-	652	661	*Brother of Aggabodhi III; *Sub-King of Dathopa Tissa
	Dappula I	-	-	661	664	*Son-in-law of Silimeghavanna
	Dathopa Tissa II	-	673	664	673	*Nephew of Dathopa Tissa I (Hattha Datha)
	Aggabodhi IV	-	-	673	689	*Younger brother of Dathopa Tissa
	Unhanagara Hatthadatha	-	-	691	691	*A chief of royal blood who was placed on the throne by a wealthy Tamil officer

=== House of Lambakanna II (691–1017) ===
Portrait	Name	Birth	Death	King from	King until	Relationship with predecessor(s)
	Manavamma	-	-	691	726	*Son of Kassapa I *Descendant of Silamegahavanna
	Aggabodhi V	-	-	726	732	*Son of Manavamma
	Kassapa III	-	-	732	738	*Brother of Aggabodhi V
	Mahinda I	-	-	738	741	*Younger brother of Kassapa III
	Aggabodhi VI	-	-	741	781	*Son of Kassapa III
	Aggabodhi VII (From Polonnaruwa)	-	-	781	787	*Son of Mahinda
	Mahinda II (Silamegha)	-	-	787	807	*Son of Aggabodhi VI
	Dappula II	-	-	807	812	*Son of Mahinda II; *The sub-king of Mahinda II
	Mahinda III	-	-	812	816	*Son of Dappula II
	Aggabodhi VIII	-	-	816	827	*Brother of Mahinda III
	Dappula III	-	-	827	843	*Younger brother of Aggabodhi VIII
	Aggabodhi IX	-	-	843	846	*Son of Dappula III
	Sena I	-	-	846	866	*Younger brother of Aggabodhi IX
	Sena II	-	-	866	901	*Nephew of Sena I *Son of Adipada Kassapa
	Udaya I	-	-	901	912	*Brother of sub-king of Sena II
	Kassapa IV	-	-	912	929	*Son of Sena II; *Sub-king of Udaya I
	Kassapa V	-	-	929	939	*Son of Kassapa IV
	Dappula IV	-	-	939	940	*Son of Kassapa V
	Dappula V	-	-	940	952	*Brother of Dappula IV
	Udaya II	-	-	952	955	*Nephew of Sena II; *Sub-king of Dappula V
	Sena III	-	-	955	964	*Brother of Udaya II
	Udaya III	-	-	964	972	*Sub-king of Sena III (a great friend of the king)
	Sena IV	-	-	972	975	*Son of Kassapa V *Sub-king of Udaya III
	Mahinda IV	-	-	975	991	*Brother of Sena IV; *Nephew of Udaya III; *Sub-king of Sena
	Sena V	-	-	991	1001	*Son of Mahinda IV
	Mahinda V (Fled and ruled in Ruhuna) (Deported c. 1017)	-	1029	1001	1029	*Younger brother of Sena V

== Chola-occupied Anuradhapura (1017–1055) ==
Portrait	Name	Birth	Death	King from	King until	Claim
	Kassapa VI	-	-	1029	1040	Son of Mahinda V
	Mahalana-Kitti	-	-	1040	1042	
	Vikrama Pandu	-	-	1042	1043	
	Jagatipala	-	-	1043	1046	
	Parakrama Pandu	-	-	1046	1048	
	Loka	-	-	1048	1054	
	Kassapa VII	-	-	1054	1055	

== Kingdom of Polonnaruwa (1055–1236) ==
=== House of Vijayabahu (1055–1187) ===
Portrait	Name	Birth	Death	King from	King until	Relationship with predecessor(s)
	Vijayabahu I	-	-	1055	1111	*Member of the Sinhala royal family
	Jayabahu I (Polonnaruwa and Ruhuna)	-	-	1110	1111	*Brother of Vijayabahu I *Prime Minister of Vijayabahu I
	Vikramabahu I	-	1132	1111	1132	*Son of Vijayabahu I
	Gajabahu II	-	-	1131	1153	*Son of Vikramabahu I
	Parakramabahu I 'the Great'	1123	1186	1153	1186	*Grandson of Vijayabahu I
	Vijayabahu II	-	-	1186	1187	*Parakramabahu I's nephew
	Mahinda VI	-	-	1187	1187	*A Kalinga

=== House of Kalinga (1187–1197) ===
Portrait	Name	Birth	Death	King from	King until	Relationship with predecessor(s)
	Nissanka Malla	1157 or 1158	1196	1187	1196	*Son-in-law or nephew to Parakrama Bahu I
	Vira Bahu I	-	-	1196	1196	*Son of Nissanka Malla
	Vikramabahu II	-	-	1196	1196	*Younger brother of Nissanka Malla
	Chodaganga	-	-	1196	1197	*Nephew of Nissanka Malla

=== House of Vijayabahu, restored (1197–1200) ===
Portrait	Name	Birth	Death	King from	King until	Relationship with predecessor(s)
	Queen Lilavati	-	-	1197	1200	*Widow of Parakramabahu I

=== House of Kalinga, restored (1200–1209) ===
Portrait	Name	Birth	Death	King from	King until	Relationship with predecessor(s)
	Sahassa Malla	-	-	1200	1202	*Younger brother of Nissanka Malla
	Kalyanavati	-	-	1202	1208	*Queen of Nissanka Malla
	Dharmasoka	-	-	1208	1209	*Deposed Kalyanavati and installed by Ayasmantha
	Anikanga	-	-	1209	1209	*Father of Dharmasoka

=== House of Vijayabahu, restored (1209–1210) ===
Portrait	Name	Birth	Death	King from	King until	Relationship with predecessor(s)
	Lilavati (1st Restoration)	-	-	1209	1210	*Widow of Parakramabahu I

=== Lokissara (1210–1211) ===
Portrait	Name	Birth	Death	King from	King until	Relationship with predecessor(s)
	Lokissara	-	-	1210	1211	Leader of a Tamil army

=== House of Vijayabahu, restored (1211–1212) ===
Portrait	Name	Birth	Death	King from	King until	Relationship with predecessor(s)
	Lilavati (2nd Restoration)	-	-	1211	1212	*Widow of Parakramabahu I

=== Pandyan dynasty (1212–1215) ===
Portrait	Name	Birth	Death	King from	King until	Relationship with predecessor(s)
	Parakrama Pandya	-	-	1212	1215	*Pandyan King

=== Eastern Ganga dynasty (1215–1236) ===
After Kalinga Magha invaded, with the intent of ruling the whole island, the Kingdom of Polonnaruwa was sacked. This caused massive Sinhalese migration to the south and west of the island. Unable to capture the whole island Kalinga Magha establishes the Jaffna kingdom becoming its first monarch. The Jaffna kingdom situated in modern northern Sri Lanka while the Kingdom of Dambadeniya was established by Vijayabahu III in around 1220.

Portrait	Name	Birth	Death	King from	King until	Relationship with predecessor(s)
	Kalinga Magha	-	-	1215	1236	*A prince of Kalinga

== Kingdom of Dambadeniya, Gampola & Kotte (1220–1597) ==
=== House of Siri Sanga Bo (1220–1345) ===
Portrait	Name	Birth	Death	King from	King until	Relationship with predecessor(s)
	Vijayabahu III	-	-	1232	1236	*A patriotic prince of Sinhala royal blood
	Parakramabahu II	-	-	1236	1270	*Eldest son of Vijaya Bahu III
	Vijayabahu IV	-	-	1270	October 1272	*Eldest son of Panditha Parakrama Bahu II
	Bhuvanekabahu I (from Yapahuwa)	-	-	1272	1284	*Brother of Vijaya Bahu IV
	Interregnum	-	-	1285	1286	
	Parakramabahu III (from Polonnaruwa)	-	-	1287	1302	*Nephew of Bhuvanekabahu I *Son of Vijaya Bahu IV
	Bhuvanekabahu II (from Kurunagala)	-	-	1302	1326	*Son of Bhuvanekabahu I *Cousin of Parakrama Bahu III
	Parakramabahu IV (from Kurunagala)	-	-	1326	1325/6	*Son of Bhuvanekabahu II
	Bhuvanekabahu III	-	-	1325/6	1325/6	*Known as Vanni Bhuvanekabahu
	Vijayabahu V	-	-	1330	1341	
Capital moved to Gampola sometime in around 1341
	Bhuvanekabahu IV	-	-	1341	1351	*Son of Vijaya Bahu V
	Parakramabahu V	1311	-	1344	1359	*Son of Vijaya Bahu V *Brother of Bhuvanekabahu IV
	Vikramabahu III	-	-	1357	1374	*Son of Bhuvanekabahu IV
Capital moved to Kotte sometime in between 1395 & 1399
	Bhuvanekabahu V	-	-	1371	1408	*Nissanka Alakeswara's son by the sister of Vikrama Bahu III
	Interregnum; Prabhuraja Vira Alakesvara	-	-	1408	1411	Member of the Alagakkonara family
	Parakramabahu VI	-	-	1411	1466	*Son of Vijaya Bahu VI and his Queen Sunetra Devi
	Jayavira Parakramabahu	-	-	1466	1469	*Son of Parakrama Bahu II's natural daughter, Ulakudaya Devi
	Bhuvanekabahu VI	-	-	1469	1477	*Son of Parakrama Bahu VI
	Pandita Parakramabahu VII	-	-	1477	1477	*Son of Bhuvanekabahu VI
	Vīra Parakramabahu VIII	-	-	1477	1489	*Ambulagala Kumara; *Son of Parakrama Bahu VI
	Dharma Parakramabahu IX	-	-	1489	1513	*Son of Vira Parakrama Bahu VIII
	Vijayabahu VI	-	1521	1513	1521	*Brother of Dharma Parakrama Bahu IX; *Rajah of Menik Kadavara
	Bhuvanekabahu VII	-	1551	1521	1551	*Eldest son of Vijaya Bahu
	Dharmapala (a.k.a. Don Juan Dharmapala)	-	27 May 1597	1551	27 May 1597	*Grandson and heir of Bhuvanekabãhu VII

== Kingdom of Raigama (1521–1538) ==
=== House of Siri Sanga Bo (1521–1594) ===
Portrait	Name	Birth	Death	King from	King until	Relationship with predecessor(s)
	Pararajasinha (a.k.a. Raigam Bandara)	-	1538	1521	1538	*Brother of Mayadunne; *Son of Vijaya Bahu VI

== Kingdom of Sitawaka (1521–1594) ==
=== House of Siri Sanga Bo (1521–1594) ===
Portrait	Name	Birth	Death	King from	King until	Relationship with predecessor(s)
	Mayadunne	1501	1581	1521	1581	*Brother of Bhuvaneka Bahu VII; *Son of Vijaya Bahu VI
	Rajasinha I (a.k.a. Tikiri Banda)	1544	1593	1581	1593	*Son of Mayadunne *Reestablished Shaiva Siddhanta after its decline in Devanampiya Tissa's era and crushed Buddhism
	Rajasuriya	-	-	1593	1594	
	Nikapitiye Bandara	-	-	1593	1594	

== Kingdom of Kandy (1469–1815) ==
=== House of Senasammata Vikramabahu (1469–1592) ===
Portrait	Name	Birth	Death	King from	King until	Relationship with predecessor(s)
	Senasammata Vikramabahu	-	-	1469	1511	*Belongs to Kotte royal blood line *Leader of the Kandyan secession from Kotte
	Jayavira	-	-	1511	1552	*Son of Senasammata
	Karalliyadde Bandara	-	-	1552	1581	*Son of Jayaweera
	Kusumasana Devi	-	-	1581	1581	*Daughter of Karalliyadde
	Rajasinha I (a.k.a. Tikiri Banda)	1544	1593	1581	1592	*Deposed Kusumasana Devi

=== House of Vimaladharmasuriya (1592–1739) ===
Portrait	Name	Birth	Death	King from	King until	Relationship with predecessor(s)
	Vimaladharmasuriya I (a.k.a. Don João da Austria)	-	1604	1592	1604	*Son of Vijayasundara Bandara
	Senarat	-	1635	1604	1635	*Cousin of Vimala Dharma Suriya I
	Rajasinha II	1608	6 December 1687	1635	25 November 1687	*Son of Senarat and Dona Catherina
	Vimaladharmasurya II	-	4 June 1707	1687	4 June 1707	*Son of King Rajasinghe II
	Vira Narendra Sinha (a.k.a. Sri Vira Parakrama Narendra Singha)	1690	13 May 1739	4 June 1707	13 May 1739	*Son of Vimala Dharma Suriya II

=== Nayaks of Kandy (1739–1815) ===
Portrait	Name	Birth	Death	King from	King until	Marriages	Relationship with predecessor(s)
	Sri Vijaya Rajasinha	? Madurai, Madurai Nayak dynasty son of Pitti Nayakkar	11 August 1747; Kandy	13 May 1739	11 August 1747	1 Madurai spouse	Brother-in-law of Vira Narendra Sinha
	Kirti Sri Rajasinha	1734; Madurai, Madurai Nayak dynasty son of Narenappa Nayakkar	2 January 1782; Kandy	11 August 1747	2 January 1782	6 Madurai spouses Yakada Doli; 2 sons, 6 daughters	Brother-in-law of Sri Vijaya Rajasinha
	Sri Rajadhi Rajasinha	? Madurai son of Narenappa Nayakkar	26 July 1798; Kandy	2 January 1782	26 July 1798	Queen Upendramma	Brother of Kirti Sri Rajasinha
	Sri Vikrama Rajasinha (a.k.a. Rajasinha IV; Kannasamy)	1780; Madurai son of Sri Venkata Perumal and Subbamma Nayaka	30 January 1832; Vellore Fort, Company rule in India	26 July 1798	5 March 1815	4 spouses 3 children	Nephew of Sri Rajadhi Rajasinha
