= Maha Naga of Anuradhapura =

Maha Naga
- King of Anuradhapura
- Reign: 569– 571
- Predecessor: Kittisiri Meghavanna
- Successor: Aggabodhi I
- Dynasty: House of Moriya

Mahanaga (reigned 569 – 571 CE) was a monarch of the Anuradhapura Kingdom of Sri Lanka. Originally a regional ruler of Ruhuna, he ascended the throne of Anuradhapura after a successful rebellion, thereby ending the Dhatusena dynasty and establishing a new royal lineage. His rise to power is steeped in legend, involving prophecies and a long period of patience before claiming the throne.

== Early life and legend ==
Mahanaga was a member of the Moriya clan and resided in the Ruhuna region during the reign of King Silakala. Described as a man of high ambition, he abandoned his family's farming livelihood to become a bandit in the forests.

Chronicles recount a legend regarding his destiny. During a famine, Mahanaga assisted a sorcerer. In gratitude, the sorcerer took him to the coast of Gokanna (modern Trincomalee) and summoned a Cobra King (Nagaraya). Mahanaga, though fearful, managed to touch the cobra's tail with three fingers.

The sorcerer prophesied that because he touched the tail (the end) rather than the head, Mahanaga would only become king in his old age. Furthermore, because he used three fingers, he would war with three kings and kill the fourth before reigning for only three years.

== Rise to power in Ruhuna ==
Driven by this prophecy (or perhaps simple ambition), Mahanaga abandoned banditry and traveled to Anuradhapura to serve King Silakala.

King Silakala, seeing an opportunity to stabilize the troublesome southern region, appointed Mahanaga as the revenue collector (ayakami) for Ruhuna. Mahanaga used his local experience to succeed in this role.

After that he was eventually promoted to the high military rank of Andasenapathi.

As his power grew, Mahanaga allied with his kinsman Agbo (Aggabodhi) and rebelled against King Silakala. The rebellion was successful, and Mahanaga established himself as the independent ruler of Ruhuna. He maintained this independence throughout the reigns of Silakala, Dathappabhuti, and Moggallana II.

== Accession to the throne of Anuradhapura ==
Mahanaga's opportunity to claim the entire island came after the death of King Moggallana II. He did not attack immediately but waited during the reign of Moggallana's successor, Kittsirimegha.

=== Waiting period ===
Historical records indicate Mahanaga waited patiently for 19 years while Kittsirimegha ruled. The administration of Kittsirimegha was marked by corruption and weakness, which likely strengthened Mahanaga's position without the need for immediate war. In 569 CE, Mahanaga launched his campaign, killed King Kittsirimegha, and seized the throne of Anuradhapura. This event restored peace to the country after a period of administrative decline.

== Reign and reforms ==
Mahanaga was an old man by the time he became King of Anuradhapura. True to the prophecy, he reigned for only three years (569–571 CE).

Aware of his advanced age, Mahanaga appointed his nephew and loyal ally, Aggabodhi (Agbo), as the sub-king (Yuvaraja) and administrator of the Southern Province (Dakshinadesa). This ensured a stable succession and secured the loyalty of the people.

To win the favor of the populace, he engaged in numerous meritorious acts, specifically renovating viharas (temples) and supporting the monastic community throughout the kingdom.

== Death and legacy ==
King Mahanaga died in 571 CE. His short reign served as a bridge between the unstable end of the Dhatusena dynasty and the beginning of a new era under his successor, Aggabodhi I.

== See also ==
- List of Sri Lankan monarchs
- History of Sri Lanka

Maha Naga of Anuradhapura House of Moriya Born: ? ? Died: ? ?
Regnal titles
Preceded by Kittisiri Meghavanna	King of Anuradhapura; 561–564	Succeeded by Aggabodhi I
