= LGBTQ history in Sri Lanka =

The history of LGBTQ people in Sri Lanka covered in this article dates back to a couple of centuries before the start of the Vikram Samvat era (300 BCE), although it is highly likely that archaeology predating this period exists. There are virtually zero historical records of LGBTQ people in the Latin script dating prior to colonialism. The concept of Sri Lanka did not exist prior to colonialism, and the term 'lanka' translates to 'island'.

== Monarchical period ==
The traditional legal codes of Lanka did not criminalise, or actively discriminate against, sexual minorities. It is believed that gender stereotypes were less important and more blurred during this era, with sexuality being more expressive (sexual sculptures similar to those found at Hindu temples in India can be found on temples in Sri Lanka).

=== Buddhism ===
Sri Lanka has the longest unbroken history of adhering to Buddhism. In the 5th century of the Christian calendar, the monk Buddhaghosa attempted to explain Pandakas in his scriptures, to the Buddhist lay people. Other records simply stay silent on the subject. For example, the Upāsakajanalankara, a guide for common people written in the 14th century of the Christian calendar discusses sexual misconduct in depth but makes no mention of homosexual sex.

A number of same-sex relationships were discussed in a variety of poems and literature, such as the literature of Culavamsa; however, these do not venture into deep eroticism and can also be viewed as a very intense "bromance".

The Buddhism followed in Sri Lanka does not hold the view that sexual minorities would have been discriminated through the philosophies forwarded by the Buddha. Homosexuality is not specifically targeted in the Buddhist scriptures that are followed on the island and it is thought that this is because Buddhism did not view homosexuality as a topic of concern.

The Tripitaka does, however, contain passing references to homosexuality and transsexuality. For example, homosexuality is found in a case of a monk, called Wakkali, who became a monk due to his intense attraction towards Buddha, or transsexuality in a case of a man who converted to a woman and married another man. We also find a case where a novice monk masturbated to a high ordained monk.

Buddhism in Sri Lanka mostly focuses on sex on a non-discriminatory basis. It holds the view that sex and sexual thoughts are a hindrance in general to follow the path towards Nibbhana, pre-marital sex is considered immoral. However, it does accept post-marital sex and considers it as an obligation between married couples. This is reflected in modern-day discussion about sex, including discussion on same-sex relations. The monastic rules state that monks should be celibate, but note that these rules do not extend to the lay people.

Ground views shares the opinion that Sri Lanka without colonial influences would have probably held a similar culture to that of Thailand.

=== Hinduism ===
The concept of sexual minorities was widely known in the prevailing Hindu culture by the time Gautama Buddha founded his philosophies. The monastic disciplines of the island explicitly contained homosexual sex alongside a variety of prohibitions against heterosexual sex, and it explicitly stated that these rules were only to be applied to monks, and not the common people. It is notable that masturbation is not considered a serious offense by the order.

A sexual non-conformist is stated as being Pandaka. These people were discriminated against in the sense that they were not allowed to be ordained as a monk. It has been thought that these people are hermaphrodites or eunuchs, though a modern concept found on the island called nachchis might also be the best translation - referring to effeminate homosexuals who engage in sex work.

== British Ceylon period ==
=== Christianity ===
With the colonial expansion of European empires to the island, also came missionaries from the European church. Dutch traveler Johan Stavorinus reported that male homosexuality "is not only universal in practice among them, but extends to a bestial communication with brutes, and in particular with sheep".

An observer in the 16th century, most likely a priest from the European church of ethnic European descent, claimed that “the sin of sodomy is so prevalent... that it makes us very afraid to live there. And if one of the principle men of the kingdom is questioned about if they are not ashamed to do such a thing as ugly and dirty, to this they respond that they do everything that they see the king doing, because that is the custom among them.”

Englishman John Knox, who by this time had lived in the country for twenty years, wrote about the King of Kandy: “Most of his Attendants are Boyes, and Young Men, that are well favoured, and of good Parentage. For the supplying himself with these, he gives order to his Dissava's or Governors of the countries to pick and choose out Boyes, that are comely and of good Descent, and send them to the Court. These boyes go bare-headed with long hair hanging down their backs."

=== Article 365 ===
Article 365 of the Penal Code criminalised homosexual sex between two men. Despite the criminalisation of homosexual sex, the island remained largely free of witch-hunts or programs against LGBT, and was often considered to be a safe haven for Europeans fleeing homophobia back home; it is thought that the natives' views of homosexuality from Hinduism/Buddhism initially helped restrain homophobia to lower levels.

== Sri Lanka since 1948 ==
Regardless of their sexuality, the men are expected to marry women in adulthood.

=== Lesbian Sex Criminalized ===
Same-sex relations between two women were outlawed in 1995. Constitutional Affairs Minister G. L. Peiris at the time was trying to decriminalise homosexual relations between two men, but members of the parliament revolted against the proposal and, after realising that lesbians were not covered under the existing law, voted to expand the law to cover women as well. The law states that lesbian sex is punishable by up to twelve years in prison.

The media at the time was mostly supportive of motions to support the lesbian community on the island according to Chinese news outlet, South China Morning Post. This is however conflicted by a news report from the UK's BBC which stated that the Sri Lanka Press Council set aside a complaint against a homophobic letter published in a leading newspaper, stating that lesbianism was an "act of sadism".

The island's LGBT community would meet up annually at a resort to celebrate homosexuality. The rampant problem of child sex abuse in the Sangha is widely known, but many observers do not find evidence for it.

=== The Middle Path ===
The ethnic conflict on the island is often cited as a major reason why legal rights for sexual minorities did not progress with the same speed as other countries. Often, political parties that focused on moderation and the "middle path", emphasising the needs for human rights, would be sidelined in favour of political parties that supported extremist and nationalist politics.

The European Union has recently proposed to use its elevated trade deal negotiations to ensure that human rights on the island would be protected.

In November 2016, Sri Lanka voted against a plan to get rid of the UN Independent Expert on violence and discrimination based on sexual orientation and gender identity at the United Nations General Assembly. The push to get rid of the [UN] expert failed 84-77. Sri Lanka along with Kiribati were the only two countries, where homosexuality is still criminalised, who voted against the proposal.

The conservative government later announced that the Constitution of Sri Lanka bans discrimination based on sexual orientation. It also updated its human rights action plan to advance further rights for LGBT. It was consequently followed by an announcement from the Supreme Court of Sri Lanka that it would not be able to enforce the criminal law Section 365A if a case was brought before it.

In January 2017, cabinet members of the Sri Lankan Government rejected the chance to legalise homosexuality. But in November, Deputy Solicitor General Nerin Pulle stated that the government would move to decriminalise same-sex sexual activity.

In 2023, a report reveals the mayority of 69% of population opposed same-sex unions' legalization, with a 60% strongly opposed it.

== Timeline ==
Date	Event	Reference
500 BC	Sculptures on temples that depict sexuality and same-sex acts.	
[600 BC to] 100 BC	The Pali canon is written largely in Sri Lanka and partially in India, inscribing the words of Gautama Buddha staying that sexual relations, whether of homosexual or of heterosexual nature, is forbidden in the monastic code, and states that any acts of soft homosexual sex (such as masturbation and interfumeral sex) does not entail a punishment but must be confessed to the monastery. These codes apply to monks only and not to the general population.	
400	Buddhaghosa, a monk in Anurādhapura, Sri Lanka, wrote about sexual minorities. Among the writings, he wrote that panadas "are full of defiling passions (ussanakilesa); their lusts are unquenchable (avupasantaparilaha); and they are dominated by their libido (parilahavegabhibhuta) and the desire for lovers just like prostitutes (vesiya) and coarse young girls (thulakumarika)"	.
500	The Mahawansa describes an intimate relationship between King Kumaradasa and poet Kalidasa	
600	Some "intense" same-sex relationships, such as that between Prince Manavamma and King Narasiha, is recorded in the Cullavamsa	
700	The Nalanda Gedige is built depicting statues engaged in numerous actions of sex including a homosexual threesome.	
1300	The Upāsakajanalankara, a text written by monks on the island aimed at lay people, discusses sexual misconduct but makes no mention of homosexuality	.
1547-Nov	Joao de Casto of Portugal describes homosexual activity on the island	
1798	Dutch traveller Johan Stavorinus describes homosexuality in the "East Indies" which included his travels to Ceylon.	
1886	The Penal Code of Sri Lanka criminalises homosexual sex in Sri Lanka under Section 365 and Section 365A.	
1995	Parliament expands Section 365 to include lesbians	
	Companions on a Journey organises the first all-island lesbian meeting	.
2004	Activists found the charitable organisation Equal Ground	.
2005	Equal Ground organizes the first gay pride event in Colombo	.
2007	The Supreme Court of Nepal states that criminalising homosexual sex is against the Constitution of Nepal	.
2009	The Swedish International Development Agency forms a coalition of activists and charities to support sexual minorities in Sri Lanka	.
	The High Court of Delhi supports the Naz Foundation's efforts to decriminalise gay sex	.
2013	Norway assigns an open lesbian as its ambassador to Sri Lanka	.
	The Commonwealth Head of Human Rights announces reliable reports reveal several LGBT activists were threatened with arrest and condemned the Government for harassment of the LGBT community	
2014	The Government of Sri Lanka states that LGBT rights are constitutionally protected	
	An LGBT film festival in Kolkata screens movies from Sri Lanka.	
2015	The leader of the far-left Communist-Marxist party in Sri Lanka states he is opposed to granting LGBT rights	
2016	The government holds a conference on reforming the constitution in order to advance LGBT rights	.
	Dr Jayampathy Wickramaratne, a parliamentary lawmaker with the UNP, attends the 2016 ILGA World Conference in support of the LGBT community	.
	The influential Buddhist chapter, Asgiriya Chapter, the custodian of the sacred tooth relic of Buddha, came out in support of extending rights to LGBT, including support to amend the constitution.	
2017	The approved draft of the National Human Rights Action Plan omitted the inclusion of repelling the law criminalising homosexual sex.	
	The government stated that it was committed to ensuring non-discrimination on the grounds of sexual orientation and gender identity, including law reform.	
2018	The Supreme Court of India states that criminalising homosexual sex is against the Constitution of India.	
	Colombo Pride Month is held in June.	
	The President of Sri Lanka used a homophobic slur in a speech to his party's followers to describe the other half of the former coalition government. The government however claimed that he did not refer to the LGBT community.	

== See also ==
- LGBTQ people in Sri Lanka
- Tamil LGBTQ people
