= Manavanna of Anuradhapura =

King of Anuradhapura from 684 to 718

Manavamma මානවම්ම

King of Anuradhapura
- Reign: 684 A.D. - 718 A.D.
- Predecessor: Unhanagara Hatthadatha
- Successor: Aggabodhi V
- Issue: Aggabodhi V Kassapa III; Mahinda I
Names
- Manaka; Mahalepano; Manavarman
- Dynasty: House of Lambakanna II
- Father: Kassapa II of Anuradhapura
- Religion: Theravada Buddhism

Manavamma (Sinhala: මානවම්ම, [maːnəʋammə]), also known as Manavarman in Indian sources, was king of Anuradhapura from 684 AD to 718 AD. Considered an important monarch of the Anuradhapura kingdom, he is known for concluding almost half a century of anarchy and ushering an era of prosperity within the nation.

As a king, Manavamma ended the long civil strife and warfare which had rampaged the country and its populous. Manawanna was also the first king who took the title Sēnāḍipati (Become head of army by consent and become true essence of power of an army) in his monarchial name.

== Life in Exile ==
Manavamma was a son of King Kassapa II of Anuradhapura, who came to power around 650 A.D. He ruled the country for around 9 years. Conflict arose for gaining power after the death of Kassapa II. Manavamma did not get involved and fled to Pallava-ruled South India shortly after his marriage as the other claimants to the throne were in search for him.

Not long after his flight to the Pallava lands, he met Narasimhavarman I, by then the ruler of the Pallavas, and served under him. The Chulavamsa documents a profound same-sex relationship between Prince Manavamma and King Narasimhavarman I. Being a renowned warrior and commander, Manavanna assisted Narasimhavarman in his war against the Deccan Chalukyas, securing a decisive victory at the Battle of Vatapi, occupying the Chalukya capital Vatapi and damaging the empire's prestige.

== Accession to the throne of Anuradhapura ==
In gratitude for this assistance and the remarkable show of prowess as a commander, Narasimhavarman gave Prince Manavamma a formidable armed force to recapture the Sri Lankan throne which had been re-usurped Dathopatissa II. During the first campaign, news arrived that the Pallava king had fallen ill, and Manavamma had to return to India to put down the risk of a Pallava succession crisis. Some sources report that while prince Manavanna was besieging Anuradhapura, a rumour spread within the army that the prince is suffering from a serious illness, which made his men lose morale. Dathopatissa, rejuvenated by the rumour, returned from his base at Ruhuna with Tamil mercenaries to confront Manavanna. So the prince had to flee back to the Pallava kingdom. After arriving in India, Manavamma had to serve the Pallavas for another 20 years till before regaining an opportunity to conquer Anuradhapura. This relatively quiet period was spent on re-gathering supplies and military support and assisting the Pallava kings on their wars with the Chalukyas and Pandyas. According to Pallava sources it is stated that Sri Lanka was under Narasimhavarman's suzerainty for a time, but this has not yet been verified.

By then, the growing power of Tamil mercenaries in the North had seized Anuradhapura, placing a puppet king, Unhanagara Hattadatha on the throne, much to the discontent of the Buddhist Sinhalese majority in the city and nearby. As political power in the nation began to fracture, with rebellions arising across Sri Lanka, and Pallavas eyeing the rival Tamil kingdom as a threat, Narasimhavarman II agreed to muster an imperial army to reconquer Anuradhapura.

But with the previous experience, the army was not interested in this campaign. The king used a trick to rebuild morale within the army, by giving his robes to Manavanna. The plan worked and the prince set out to Sri Lanka with a fresh army, where he successfully vanquished Hatthadata in battle. The puppet king fled, and soon after Anuradhapura fell to Manavanna's forces. Hattadatha was killed during the siege and his minister and kingmaker, Poththakutta fled to a nearby village where he met his own death by being poisoned by a village head who was a friend of his, but due to the inability of choosing loyalty, intoxicated Poththakutta and himself.

== See also ==
- List of Sri Lankan monarchs
- History of Sri Lanka
- History of sexual minorities in Sri Lanka

Manavanna of Anuradhapura House of Lambakanna II
Regnal titles
Preceded by Unhanagara Hatthadatha	King of Anuradhapura; 684–718	Succeeded by Aggabodhi V
