= Kassapa III =

- King of Anuradhapura
- Reign: 732 – 738
- Predecessor: Aggabodhi V
- Successor: Mahinda I
- Dynasty: House of Lambakanna II
- Father: Manavanna

Kassapa III (Sinhala: තුන් වන කස්සප, [tun ʋənə kassəpə]) was King of Anuradhapura in the 8th century, whose reign lasted from 732 to 738. He succeeded his brother Aggabodhi V as King of Anuradhapura and was succeeded by his younger brother Mahinda I.

== See also ==
- List of Sri Lankan monarchs
- History of Sri Lanka

Kassapa III House of Lambakanna II Born: ? ? Died: ? ?
Regnal titles
Preceded by Aggabodhi V	King of Anuradhapura; 732–738	Succeeded by Mahinda I
