= Aggabodhi V =

- King of Anuradhapura
- Reign: 726 – 732
- Predecessor: Manavanna
- Successor: Kassapa III
- Dynasty: House of Lambakanna II
- Father: Manavanna

Aggabodhi V was King of Anuradhapura in the 8th century, whose reign lasted from 726 to 732. He succeeded his father Manavanna as King of Anuradhapura and was succeeded by his brother Kassapa III.

== See also ==
- List of Sri Lankan monarchs
- History of Sri Lanka

Aggabodhi V House of Lambakanna II Born: ? ? Died: ? ?
Regnal titles
| Preceded by Manavanna | King of Anuradhapura; 726–732 | Succeeded by Kassapa III |
