= Aggabodhi I =

Aggabodhi I පළමුවන අග්ගබෝධි

King of Anuradhapura
- Reign: 571-604 (564 – 598)
- Predecessor: Maha Naga
- Successor: Aggabodhi II
Names
- Akbo; Lamani Singana Akbo
- Dynasty: House of Moriya
- Religion: Therevada Buddhism

Aggabodhi I (also known as Akbo) (Sinhala: පළමුවන අග්ගබෝධි, අක්බෝ) was a king of the Anuradhapura Kingdom in the 6th and 7th centuries. His reign, lasting 34 years (571–604 AD), is remembered as a period of significant prosperity, peace, and major advancements in hydraulic engineering and literature.

== Biography ==
=== Accession and lineage ===
Aggabodhi I succeeded Mahanaga (r. 569–571 AD). Historical records describe him as the nephew (baana) or, according to some interpretations, the son of the king's sister. He assumed the throne at a time when the Moriya dynasty was regaining its strength. During his reign, he established a clear succession system, appointing his brother as the yuvaraja (crown prince) and assigning him the administration of the Southern region (Dakshina Deshaya).

== Irrigation and water management ==
Aggabodhi I’s most enduring legacy is the construction of the Manimekhala Anicut (the ancient name for the Minipe Dam) and the accompanying Minipe Canal (Minipe Ela).

He successfully dammed the Mahaweli River at Minipe, a feat that required advanced knowledge of river currents and structural stability. He also built the major canal to carry water from the dam over long distances. While some legends suggest an earlier trace existed, Aggabodhi I is the ruler who transformed it into a massive, functioning irrigation artery, extending it to reach the Manihira (Minneriya) reservoir. He is also the builder of the Kurundavapi (Kurundu Vewa), a large tank in the Mullaitivu District (modern-day Tannimurippu Kulam), which served as a vital water source for the Vanni region.

== Administration and titles ==
The reign of Aggabodhi I saw the formalization of royal titles. The term mahadipāda (which evolved into the Sinhala title mapā) first appears during his time, specifically granted to his nephew. This era also highlights a clear distinction between the titles uparāja and yuvarāja, reflecting a sophisticated hierarchical structure within the Sri Lankan monarchy.

== Religious and cultural contributions ==
The king was a devout patron of Buddhism and a supporter of the Mahavihara tradition. He constructed several viharas (monasteries) and provided generous land grants and tanks to support the monks (sangha). Aggabodhi I also actively participated in settling disputes within the Buddhist order, most notably the debate between the Mahavihara and the Abhayagiri/Vaitulya traditions, where he supported the orthodox Mahavihara. His era is considered a golden age of Sinhala literature. He was a patron of the "Twelve Great Poets" (Dolos Kavi), and his court was a center for intellectual and artistic growth.

== Death and legacy ==
Aggabodhi I died in 604 AD. Because of the stability and prosperity he established, his successor, Aggabodhi II (his nephew and son-in-law), was able to continue his large-scale irrigation works, including the construction of the famous Kantale Tank and Giritale Tank. Aggabodhi I is historically regarded as a ruler who balanced the spiritual needs of the country with its economic and structural development.

== Works by the king ==
King Aggabodhi had constructed various structures such as coconut field and a tank near the ancient viharaya called Kurundi.

== See also ==
- List of Sri Lankan monarchs
- History of Sri Lanka

Aggabodhi I House of Moriya Born: ? ? Died: ? ?
Regnal titles
| Preceded by Maha Naga | King of Anuradhapura; 564–598 | Succeeded by Aggabodhi II |
