= Dathopa Tissa II =

- King of Anuradhapura
- Reign: 659 - 667 (664 – 673)
- Predecessor: Dappula I
- Successor: Aggabodhi IV
- Died: 673
- Dynasty: House of Moriya

Dathopa Tissa II was King of Anuradhapura in the 7th century, whose reign lasted from 664 to 673(or 659 to 667). He was the nephew of Dathopa Tissa I through an unnamed sister and succeeded Dappula I as King of Anuradhapura. He was succeeded by his brother Aggabodhi IV.

== See also ==
- List of Sri Lankan monarchs
- History of Sri Lanka

Dathopa Tissa II House of Moriya Born: ? ? Died: ? ?
Regnal titles
Preceded by Dappula I	King of Anuradhapura; 664–673	Succeeded by Aggabodhi IV
