= Aggabodhi IV =

- King of Anuradhapura
- Reign: 673 – 689(667 - 683)
- Predecessor: Dathopa Tissa II
- Successor: Unhanagara Hatthadatha
- Dynasty: House of Moriya

Aggabodhi IV was King of Anuradhapura in the 7th century, whose reign lasted from 673 to 689(667 to 683). He succeeded his brother Dathopa Tissa II as King of Anuradhapura and was succeeded by Unhanagara Hatthadatha.

== See also ==
- List of Sri Lankan monarchs
- History of Sri Lanka

Aggabodhi IV House of Moriya Born: ? ? Died: ? ?
Regnal titles
Preceded by Dathopa Tissa II	King of Anuradhapura; 673–689	Succeeded by Unhanagara Hatthadatha
