= Moggallana III =

- King of Anuradhapura
- Reign: 614-619( 608 – 614)
- Predecessor: Sangha Tissa II
- Successor: Silameghavanna
- House: Moggallana III
- Dynasty: House of Moriya?
- Religion: Theravada Buddhism

Moggallana III (Sinhala: තුන්වන මුගලන්) was a King of the Anuradhapura Kingdom (present-day Sri Lanka) who reigned from 614 AD to 619 AD. He is primarily remembered in the chronicles for his violent rise to power and his eventual overthrow by his sword-bearer, Silameghavanna.

== Rise to Power ==
Moggallana was a powerful general serving in the southern province of Rohana during the reign of Aggabodhi II. Upon the death of the king in 614 AD, he refused to acknowledge the new monarch, Sangha Tissa II, and launched a military campaign to seize the throne. After capturing the fortress of Mahagalla, he engaged Sanghatissa's forces in a battle characterized by a bizarre accident: a falling tree branch struck the King's state elephant, causing the royal troops to panic and flee. Moggallana captured the capital and subsequently ordered the execution of the deposed king and his elder son at Sigiriya.

== Reign and Governance ==
Despite his violent accession, Moggallana III is credited with several religious and public works:

Religious Contributions: He performed various meritorious acts, including the restoration of several ancient viharas and the chanting of the Tripitaka.

Economic Policy: He reportedly allocated portions of the kingdom's revenue for the maintenance of religious institutions.

== Overthrow and Death ==
The latter part of his reign was marked by internal suspicion. He executed his chief general, Datha, which triggered a rebellion led by Datha’s son, Silameghavanna. Silameghavanna, who held the position of the King's sword-bearer (Asiggahaka), fled to Rohana to mobilize a provincial army. Moggallana III was eventually defeated in a battle near the Dolahala mountain and was killed, ending his six-year reign.

== See also ==
- List of Sri Lankan monarchs
- History of Sri Lanka

Moggallana III House of Moriya Born: ? ? Died: ? ?
Regnal titles
Preceded by Sangha Tissa II	King of Anuradhapura; 608–614	Succeeded by Silameghavanna
