= Aggabodhi II =

Aggabodhi II දෙවන අග්ගබෝධි
- King of Anuradhapura
- Reign: 604-614 (608–618)
- Predecessor: Aggabodhi I
- Successor: Sangha Tissa II
- Spouse: Samghabhadda
- Dynasty: House of Moriya
- Religion: Theravada Buddhism

Aggabodhi II (Sinhala: දෙවන අග්ගබෝධි, කුඩා අක්බෝ), (r. 604–614 CE or 608–618 CE), also known as Kuda Akbo, was a monarch of the Anuradhapura Kingdom in modern-day Sri Lanka. A member of the Moriya dynasty, he is celebrated for continuing the stability established by his predecessor, his extensive hydraulic engineering projects, and his role in international Buddhist diplomacy.

== Lineage and Accession ==
Aggabodhi II was the nephew (the son of a sister) of the previous king, Aggabodhi I. During the reign of his uncle, he served as a viceroy (Yuvaraja) and was entrusted with the administration of the Dakshina Desha (Southern region). He also consolidated his claim to the throne by marrying the daughter of Aggabodhi I. Upon his accession, he continued the extensive infrastructure and religious restoration work initiated by his predecessor.

== Irrigation and Infrastructure ==
Aggabodhi II is ranked as one of the preeminent "tank-builders" in Sri Lankan history, significantly advancing the island's irrigation network. While historical chronicles such as the Culavamsa and Rajavaliya attribute between three and fourteen reservoirs to him, his primary engineering legacies include:

Gangatatavapi (Kantale Dam): A massive reservoir covering between 3,263 and 4,900 acres, supplied by a 29-mile canal originating from the Minneriya tank.

Giritatavapi (Giritale Tank): A major reservoir constructed to serve the agricultural needs of the Polonnaruwa and Minneriya regions.

Elahera Canal Extension: He expanded the Alisara (Elahera) canal by an additional 35 miles to supply water to the Kantale and Giritale tanks.

Hattota Anicut: He built a dam across the Kalu Ganga (a branch of the Ambanganga) to divert water into the Elahera system via a 28-mile feeder canal.

== Religious and Diplomatic Affairs ==
A devout patron of Buddhism, the king was a supporter of the Mahavihara tradition and undertook the restoration of several ancient religious structures.

Thuparamaya Restoration: He is credited with a complete renovation of the Thuparamaya, including the renewal of the relic chamber.

Refuge of the Kalinga King: During his reign, the King of Kalinga (in modern-day India), alongside his queen and a minister, sought political asylum in Sri Lanka, likely fleeing the expansion of the Chalukya king Pulakeshin II. Aggabodhi II welcomed them with high honors; the Kalinga king eventually renounced his rule and became a Buddhist monk under the elder monk Jotipala.

== Death and Succession ==
The reign of Aggabodhi II lasted approximately ten years, ending in 614 CE (or 618 CE). Upon his death, the throne was contested, eventually going to his brother or relative of his queen Sangha Tissa II, which precipitated a period of civil war involving the general Moggallana III.

== See also ==
- List of Sri Lankan monarchs
- History of Sri Lanka
- Kantalai Tank

Aggabodhi II House of Moriya Born: ? ? Died: ? ?
Regnal titles
Preceded by Aggabodhi I	King of Anuradhapura; 608–618	Succeeded by Sangha Tissa II
