= Sangha Tissa II =

- King of Anuradhapura
- Reign: 614 (608 )
- Predecessor: Aggabodhi II
- Successor: Moggallana III
- Issue: Jettha Tissa III
- House: Sangathissa
- Dynasty: House of Moriya?
- Religion: Theravada Buddhism

Sanghatissa II (reigned c. 614 CE) was a monarch of the Anuradhapura Kingdom of Sri Lanka. Formerly the Sword-Bearer (Asiggaha) to King Aggabodhi II, he ascended the throne in 614 CE. His reign was brief and dominated by a civil war against the commander-in-chief, Moggallana, which ultimately led to his defeat and execution.

== Accession and Lineage ==
Upon the death of King Aggabodhi II in 614 CE, his sword-bearer, Prince Sanghatissa, was crowned king. There are conflicting historical accounts regarding his relationship to the royal family: The Chronicles: The Pujavaliya and Rajavaliya state that he was a younger brother of the previous king. However, the Culavamsa asserts that he was a relative of Aggabodhi II’s queen. Legitimacy: It appears Sanghatissa did not have a strong legal claim to the throne. This weakness was immediately exploited by Moggallana, the powerful commander-in-chief (Senapathi) of the previous king, who was stationed in Ruhuna.

== The Civil War ==
Immediately after Sanghatissa's accession, Moggallana launched a rebellion to seize the crown.

Moggallana marched from Ruhuna and captured the fortress of Mahagallaka (identified as Magalla or Nikaweratiya in the modern Kurunegala District). Sanghatissa’s forces attempted to suppress the rebellion but suffered a severe defeat. Undeterred, King Sanghatissa regrouped and engaged the rebels again at a place called Kadalihava. However, his army was defeated once more, forcing him to retreat to the capital.

== Betrayal and Final Defeat ==
As the war progressed, King Sanghatissa faced internal treachery. His own Commander-in-Chief (Senapathi) feigned illness and remained behind in the city of Anuradhapura, secretly undermining the King’s defense.

Battle of Pacinatissapabbata

The decisive battle took place at Pacinatissapabbata (Eastern Mountains). While the battle was raging, the treacherous Senapathi (Army commander) brought his forces and attacked the King's army from the rear. Caught between two armies, the King was placed in a perilous position. Realizing his elephant was wounded and defeat was inevitable, Sanghatissa ordered his army to split into two to confuse the enemy. He then fled the battlefield with his son and a loyal minister, hoping to escape to Ruhuna.

== Capture and Execution ==
The King, his son, and the minister were recognized and captured while fleeing at Minneriya. They were taken as prisoners to Sigiriya (Sihagiri), where the victorious Moggallana had established his camp. On the orders of Moggallana (who subsequently became King Moggallana III), all three captives—King Sanghatissa II, his son, and the loyal minister—were beheaded. This marked the end of his short reign in the same year it began (614 CE). One of Sanghatissa's other sons managed to escape the slaughter and fled to the central highlands (Malaya Desa), ensuring the survival of the lineage.

== See also ==
- List of Sri Lankan monarchs
- History of Sri Lanka

Sangha Tissa II House of Moriya Born: ? ? Died: ? ?
Regnal titles
Preceded by Aggabodhi II	King of Anuradhapura; 608–608	Succeeded by Moggallana III
