= Silameghavanna =

King of Anuradhapura from 614 to 623

- King of Anuradhapura
- Reign: 619-628 ( 614 – 623)
- Predecessor: Moggallana III
- Successor: Aggabodhi III
- Issue: Aggabodhi III
- House: Silameghavanna
- Dynasty: House of Lambakanna ?
- Religion: Theravada Buddhism

Silameghavanna (Sinhala: සිලාමේඝවණ්ණ) was a King of the Anuradhapura Kingdom (present-day Sri Lanka) who reigned from 619 AD to 628 AD. A former sword-bearer (Asiggahaka) to his predecessor, he rose to power by overthrowing King Moggallana III.

His reign marked the beginning of a new tradition where kings adopted the throne names (Abhisheka Nama) of either Silameghavanna or Siri Sangabo in alternating succession.

== Early Life and Accession ==
Moggallana III's reign was short-lived. He had rewarded a general named Datha (or Jettha) with the post of Malayaraja for his betrayal of Sanghatissa. However, Moggallana soon grew suspicious of Datha and had him executed. Datha's son, Silameghavanna (the King's sword-bearer), fled to Rohana to escape his father's fate. There, he raised a provincial army and formed an alliance with Prince Jettha Tissa, the son of a previous monarch. He eventually defeated Moggallana III in battle and declared himself king at Anuradhapura in 619 AD.

== Reign and Religious Reforms ==
His reign is characterized by significant religious upheaval and attempts to reform the Buddhist Sangha.

Purification of the Sangha: Influenced by a young monk named Bodhi, Silameghavanna initiated a "purification" of the Abhayagiri Vihara, targeting monks deemed "corrupt" or "ill-disciplined." Historical records indicate that those found guilty were subjected to harsh punishments, including expulsion and exile.

Conflict with the Mahavihara: Silameghavanna attempted to foster unity between the differing Buddhist sects (the Mahavihara and the Abhayagiri). He famously requested the monks of the Mahavihara to observe the Uposatha (sabbath) rites together with the other fraternities. When the Mahavihara elders refused on the grounds of doctrinal purity, the King reportedly insulted them.

== Civil Unrest ==
During his reign, he faced a significant rebellion led by Sirinaga, the uncle of the former King Moggallana III. Sirinaga attacked from the northern province with a large force but was ultimately defeated by Silameghavanna's army near a village named Ramititaka. Those who survived the battle were captured and distributed as laborers among various temples.

== Death and Legacy ==
According to the Culavamsa, Silameghavanna contracted a fatal disease shortly after his confrontation with the Mahavihara, which the monastically authored chronicles interpret as karmic retribution for his disrespect toward the elders. He died in 628 AD after a nine-year reign. He was succeeded by his son, Aggabodhi III. His lineage continued to play a central role in the ensuing civil wars that dominated the mid-7th century in Sri Lanka.

== See also ==
- List of Sri Lankan monarchs
- History of Sri Lanka

Silameghavanna House of Moriya Born: ? ? Died: ? ?
Regnal titles
Preceded by Moggallana III	King of Anuradhapura; 614–623	Succeeded by Aggabodhi III
