= Dathopa Tissa I =

- King of Anuradhapura
- Reign: 641-650 (640 – 652)
- Predecessor: Aggabodhi III
- Successor: Kassapa II
- House: Sangathissa-Dathasiva
- Dynasty: House of Moriya
- Religion: Theravada Buddhism

Dathopatissa I (Sinhala: පළමුවන දාඨෝපතිස්ස), also known as Dathasiva, was a King of the Anuradhapura Kingdom who reigned from 641 AD to 650 AD. His reign is defined by a fierce, decade-long civil war against Aggabodhi III and the heavy involvement of South Indian mercenary forces in Sri Lankan politics.

== Early Life and Rise to Power ==
Dathopatissa was a member of the royal family and a relative (likely the nephew) of Jettha Tissa III. Following the death of Jettha Tissa III, who committed suicide after being defeated by Aggabodhi III’s Tamil mercenaries, Dathopatissa fled to South India. He spent several years in exile, gathering a massive army of Tamil mercenaries to avenge Jettha Tissa and reclaim the throne for his faction.

== The Invasion of 641 AD ==
In the 12th year of Aggabodhi III’s reign, Dathopatissa saw an opportunity to strike due to internal divisions within the court (specifically the execution of the sub-king Mana). The Battle of Tintini: Dathopatissa landed with his mercenary forces and established a base at the village of Tintini. He decisively defeated Aggabodhi III’s army, forcing the King to flee to India for a second time. Accession: Dathopatissa I was subsequently consecrated as King in Anuradhapura.

== The "Dark Era" and Religious Desecration ==
Dathopatissa’s reign is frequently criticized in the Culavamsa and other chronicles due to the extreme economic and religious toll of his wars.

== Looting of Monasteries ==
Because Dathopatissa relied heavily on South Indian mercenaries, he faced constant pressure to pay them. To fund his military campaigns, he resorted to stripping the kingdom's most sacred sites of their wealth: He looted the golden ornaments and precious offerings from the Thuparama. He broke open the relic chambers of the Dakkhina Thupa to seize its treasures. He reportedly removed the golden "umbrella" (chattra) and other finials from the Ruwanwelisaya. The chronicles describe this as a period of great sacrilege, noting that his rival Aggabodhi III also engaged in similar looting to fund his own counter-attacks.

== Continued Civil War ==
Aggabodhi III returned from India with fresh troops, leading to a "ping-pong" style war. The capital, Anuradhapura, changed hands multiple times. During this chaos, the administrative and irrigation systems of the kingdom began to decay as resources were diverted entirely toward the conflict.

== Death and Legacy ==
After the death of Aggabodhi III in 644 AD, the struggle was continued by Aggabodhi’s brother, Kassapa II. In 650 AD, after a reign of approximately nine years, Dathopatissa I was finally defeated in battle by Kassapa II. Dathopatissa I died on the battlefield, ending his tenure but leaving behind a precedent of mercenary dependency that would lead his successor (and nephew), Dathopatissa II, to continue the cycle of conflict years later.

== See also ==
- List of Sri Lankan monarchs
- History of Sri Lanka

Dathopa Tissa I House of Moriya Born: ? ? Died: ? ?
Regnal titles
Preceded by Aggabodhi III	King of Anuradhapura; 640–652	Succeeded by Kassapa II
