= Velakkara =

Velakkaras are royal guards mentioned in various historical accounts of Sri Lanka. The general prevailing notion is that they were Tamil mercenaries employed by the Chola Emperors for administration purpose in Sri Lanka. During the Chola Empire, Velakkaras titled as the division of army used for specific purposes such as Kaikolars.

When Vijaybahu I overthrew the Chola administration, Velakkaras made alliance with King Vijaybahu the great due to the weaknesses of Chola administration in Sri Lanka.

== Etymology ==
"Velam" in Tamil means "the inner court" and probably these guards were elite and guarded the king and his family. Velam also could be the Sanskrit 'aham', both meaning the inner line of defence in a royal set up.

== See also ==
- Indian Tamils of Sri Lanka#Historyvellai-kara means time soldiers. Vela in Tamil has 3 meanings, vel -spear, velai- work, velai- time
