= House of Lambakanna I =

Powerful clan that ruled Sri Lanka in the first half of the first millennium

The Lambakarna dynasty (Sinhala: ලම්භකර්ණ වංශය) (alternatively spelt as Lambakanna) was a powerful clan that ruled Sri Lanka. Many Sri Lankan kings, beginning with King Vasabha, and up until the formation of Kingdom of Kandy, belonged to this clan or related clans.

== History ==
The first reference to this clan is found in Mahavamsa, appearing during the reign of King Ilanaga. According to the Mahavamsa, the Lambakarna were royal attendants. They accompanied the king to Thisawewa. Upon returning from their journey, the Lambakarnas had left the king alone. In response to their dereliction, Ilanaga employed the Lambakarnas to menial labour under the supervision of the Chandalas, an 'untouchable' caste. In response, the Lambakarnas revolted and usurped the throne. Ilanaga eventually managed to take the throne back. With the rule of King Vasabha, the Lambarkanas were established as a ruling dynasty. According to Kotte era sources, the Lambakarna is related to the clan that was entrusted to protect the Sri Maha Bodhi tree.

King Vasabha began Lambakarna rule over the Anaradhapura Kingdom in 65 CE. They ruled for four centuries until the Pandyan invasion of Sri Lanka.

== References in Inscriptions and literature ==
Members of the Lambakarna clan used titles such as "Lamani" and "Mahale", and were found frequently in inscriptions and literature. According to Dipavamsa, sixteen Mahalekhas (a title akin to 'secretary') identified with the Lambakarna clan arrived with the Sri Maha Bodhi. They functioned as chief guardians to institutions and functioned as writers as well. In addition, they are mentioned in Mahavansha, acting as parasol and flag bearers in coronation festivals. The Lambakarnas were versed in weapon manufacturing and counted military leaders among their clan as well.
