= Suratissa =

Suratissa සූරතිස්ස
- King of Anuradhapura
- Reign: 247 BC – 237 BC
- Predecessor: Mahasiva
- Successor: Sena and Guttika
- Died: 237 BC
- House: Vijaya
- Father: Mutasiva
- Religion: Theravāda Buddhism

Suratissa (Sinhala:සූරතිස්ස) was an early monarch of Sri Lanka in the Kingdom of Anuradhapura, based at the ancient capital of Anuradhapura from 247 BC to 237 BC. He was a son of Mutasiva and a brother of Devanampiya Tissa, Uttiya, Mahasiva, Asela and Mahanaga. Suratissa was defeated and killed in battle by two South Indian Tamil invaders Sena and Guttika who usurped the Sinhalese throne and held power over Anuradhapura. This marked the first historically recorded instance of Tamil rule in Sri Lanka. Sinhala rule was re-established in 215 BC by Suratissa's younger brother Asela.

== See also ==
- List of Sri Lankan monarchs

Suratissa Vijaya Born: ? ? Died: ? 237 BC
Regnal titles
Preceded by Mahasiva	King of Anuradhapura; 247 BC–237 BC	Succeeded by Sena and Guttika
