= Mahanaga, Prince of Ruhuna =

3rd century BC ruler of the Sri Lankan kingdom of Ruhuna

Mahanaga
- Ruler of Ruhuna
- Reign: 3rd century BC
- Successor: Yatala Tissa of Ruhuna
- Spouse: Anula
- Issue: Yatala Tissa of Ruhuna
- House: Vijaya
- Father: Mutasiva

Mahanaga was an early monarch of Sri Lanka of the Kingdom of Ruhuna in the southern region of the island. He is the founder of the Ruhuna. The Kingdom of Ruhuna was in some periods a client state loyal to the King of Anuradhapura and in some periods a country independent of it.

== Background ==
The king Mutasiva had nine sons, including Devanampiya Tissa, Uttiya, Mahasiva, Mahanaga and Asela. After Mutasiva’s death, the eldest son, Devanampiya Tissa, ascended the throne.

According to the customary succession of Anuradhapura kings, Uttiya, Mahasiva, and Mahanaga were next in line, followed by Devanampiya Tissa’s son. However, Devanampiya Tissa’s consort, Ramadatta, sought to accelerate her son’s accession and plotted to eliminate Mahanaga. One day, while Mahanaga was working in the fields with his men, the queen sent a basket of poisoned mangoes intended for him. Tragically, Devanampiya Tissa’s son consumed the fruit and died. Fearing for his safety, Prince Mahanaga decided it was unsafe to remain in the city. He departed Anuradhapura with his family and followers, eventually settling in Ruhuna.

== See also ==
- List of monarchs of Sri Lanka
- List of Ruhuna monarchs

Mahanaga, Prince of Ruhuna
Regnal titles
Preceded by -	Count of Ruhuna	Succeeded by Yatala Tissa
