= Mutasiva =

Mutasiva මුටසීව
- King of Anuradhapura
- Reign: 367 BC – 307 BC
- Predecessor: Pandukabhaya
- Successor: Devanampiya Tissa
- Died: 307 BC
- Issue: Ten sons: Prince Abhaya; King Devanampiya Tissa; King Uttiya; King Mahasiva; King Suratissa; King Asela; King Mahanaga; Prince Mattabhaya; Prince Asoka; Prince Uddhachulabhaya; Two daughters: Princess Anula; Princess Sivali
- House: Vijaya
- Dynasty: Shakya
- Father: Pandukabhaya
- Mother: Swarnapali

Mutasiva (Sinhala: මුටසීව, [muʈəsi:ʋə]) was ruler of the Kingdom of Anuradhapura in Sri Lanka, based at the ancient capital of Anuradhapura. He ruled from 367 BC to 307 BC. He had ten sons, some of whom were his successors such Devanampiya Tissa, Uttiya, Mahasiva, Suratissa and Asela. Mutasiva was the son of King Pandukabhaya.

The king reigned for sixty years, marking an unbroken era of peace in the country. During Mutasiva period the existence of the pearls off the coast of Ceylon was known to the people of the country, and they Also had knowledge of the pearls to divide them into eight different varieties and at this time mining of gems was conducted, His sole recorded accomplishment is the creation of Mahamevnāwa Park in Anuradhapura which is the most extensive and beautiful park in ancient Lanka also the first king to construct a park.

== See also ==
- Mahavamsa
- List of Sri Lankan monarchs
- History of Sri Lanka

Mutasiva Vijaya Born: ? ? Died: ? ?
Regnal titles
Preceded by Pandukabhaya	King of Anuradhapura; 367 BC–307 BC	Succeeded by Devanampiya Tissa
