= House of Vijaya =

First recorded Sinhalese royal dynasty that ruled over Sri Lanka

House of Vijaya Vijayan dynasty
- Royal house
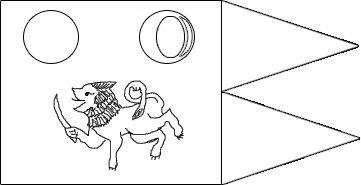
- Flag of King Dutugamunu, as depicted in the Dambulla Viharaya cave no.2
- Country: Kingdom of Tambapanni; Kingdom of Anuradhapura
- Founded: 543 BC
- Founder: Prince Vijaya
- Current head: Extinct
- Final ruler: Subharaja
- Titles: King of Tambapanni; King of Upatissa Nuwara; King of Anuradhapura
- Dissolution: 66 AD

The House of Vijaya (also known as the Vijayan dynasty and sometimes referred to as the "Great Dynasty") was the first recorded Sinhalese royal dynasty that ruled over the island Sri Lanka. According to Sri Lankan folklore, Prince Vijaya is the traditional first king of Sri Lanka, founding the Kingdom of Tambapanni and the dynasty subsequently founding the Kingdom of Upatissa Nuwara and finally the Anuradhapura Kingdom.

There were 37 Vijayan monarchs who reigned during a span of 609 years and ruled all but 80 of them. The dynasty ended when Vasabha of the House of Lambakanna I seized power in 66 AD.

== Origins ==
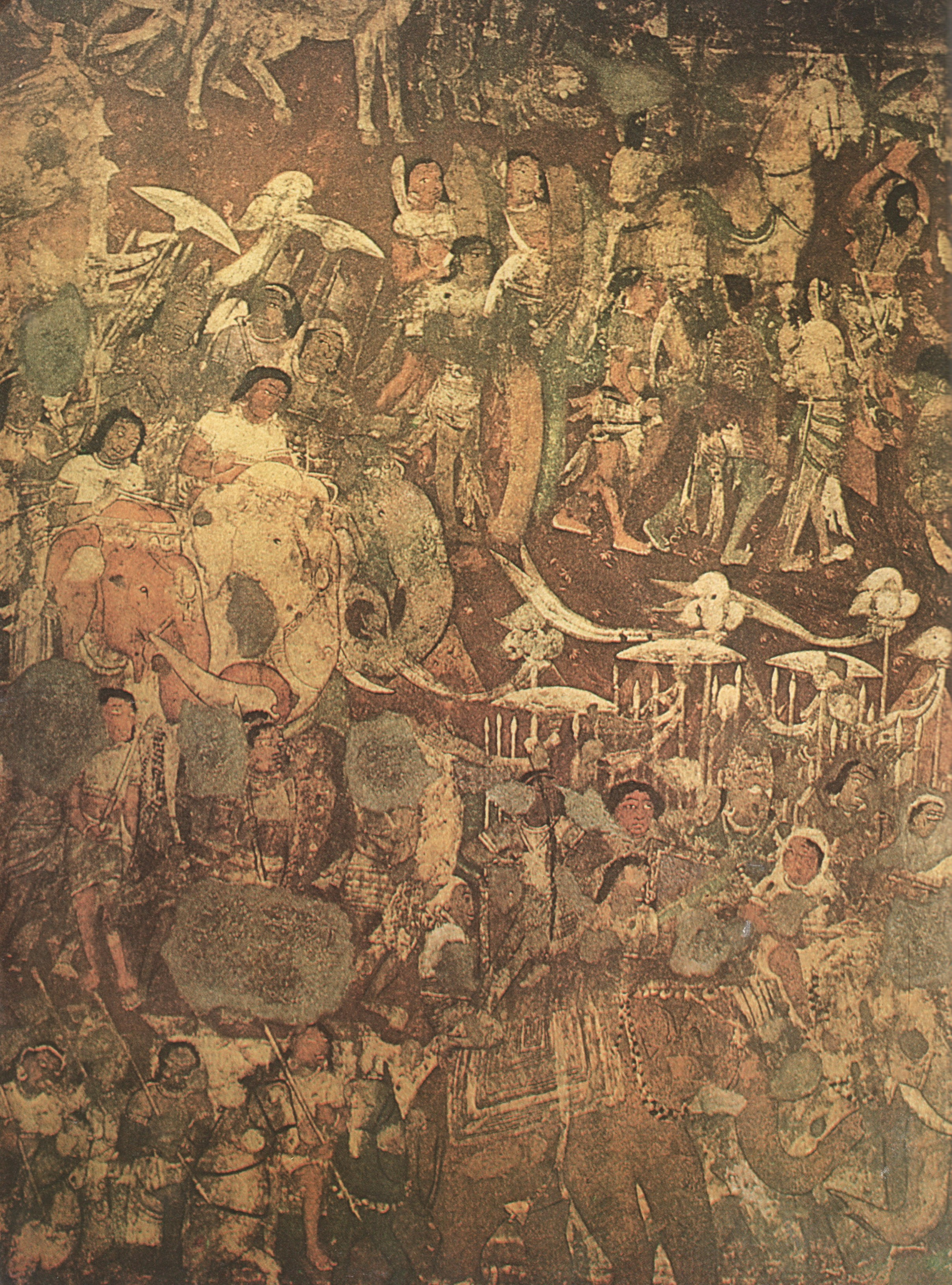
A section of the mural at the Ajanta Caves depicts the 'coming of Sinhala'. Prince Vijaya is seen in both of groups of elephants and riders.

According to legend, in 543 BC, prince Vijaya (543–505 BC) arrived in Sri Lanka, having been banished from his homeland in Singur, India. He eventually brought the island under his control and established himself as king. After this, his retinue established villages and colonies throughout the country. One of these was established by Anuradha, a minister of King Vijaya, on the banks of a stream called Kolon and was named Anuradhagama.

== Reign ==
=== Tambapanni ===
According to popular tradition, the Kingdom of Tambapanni was founded by Prince Vijaya and his 700 followers after landing on the island, in a district near modern day Mannar which is believed to be the district of Chilaw, after leaving Suppāraka. It is recorded the Vijaya made his landing on the day of Buddha's death. Vijaya claimed Tambapanni his capital and soon the whole island come under this name. Tambapanni was originally inhabited and governed by Yakkhas, having their capital at Sirīsavatthu and their queen Kuveni. According to the Samyutta Commentary, Tambapanni was one hundred leagues in extent.

After landing in Tambapanni, Vijaya is believed to have met Kuveni, a legendary queen of the yakkhas, who was disguised as a beautiful woman but was really a yakkini (devil) named Sesapathi.

During the end of his reign Vijaya, who was having trouble choosing a successor, sent a letter to the city of his ancestors, Sinhapura, in order to invite his brother Sumitta to take over the throne. However Vijaya had died before the letter had reached its destination so the elected minister of the people Upatissa, the Chief government minister or prime minister and leading chief among the Sinhalese became regent and acted as regent for a year. After his coronation which was held in the Kingdom of Tambapanni, he left it building another one bearing his own name. While his was king, Upatissa established the new capital Upatissagāma, in which the kingdom was moved to from the Kingdom of Tambapanni. When Vijaya's letter arrived Sumitta had already succeeded his father as king of his country, and so he sent his son Panduvasdeva to rule Upatissa Nuwara.

Upatissagāma was seven or eight miles further north of Tambapanni. It was named after the regent king Upatissa, who was the prime minister of Vijaya.

=== Anuradhapura ===
In 377 BC, King Pandukabhaya (437–367 BC) made Anuradhapura his capital and developed it into a prosperous city. Anuradhapura (Anurapura) was named after the minister who first established the village and after a grandfather of Pandukabhaya who lived there. The name was also derived from the city's establishment on the auspicious asterism called Anura. Anuradhapura was the capital of all the monarchs who ruled from the dynasty.

The consecration ceremonies and rituals associated with kingship began during the reign of Devanampiya Tissa, under the influence of Ashoka of India. The whole country was brought under the rule of a single monarch by Dutthagamani for the first time. Before this, it had several principalities independent of the Anuradhapura Kingdom. The king of Anuradhapura was seen as the supreme ruler throughout the island, even at times when he did not have absolute control over it.

Several invasions have been made against the Anuradhapura Kingdom, all of which were launched from South India. The first invasion recorded in the history of the country is during the reign of Suratissa (247–237 BC), where he was overthrown by two horse dealers from South India named Sena and Guththika. After ruling the country for 22 years, they were defeated by Asela (215–205 BC), who was in turn overthrown by another invasion led by a Chola prince named Ellalan (205–161 BC). Elara ruled for 44 years before being defeated by Dutthagamani. The country was invaded again in 103 BC by five Dravidian chiefs, who ruled until 89 BC when they were defeated by Valagamba.

== Genealogy ==
The House of Vijaya claimed a close relationship to the Shakya dynasty, family of the Gautama Buddha.

King of Kalinga	Mahasammata line of Kings
King of Vanga	Princess	Prince	Jayasena (Note: King of Kapilavastu)
The Lion	Suppadevi	Royal Standard Bearer	Kacchana	Sihahanu	Yasodhara	Anjana
Sinhabahu (Note: King of Sinhapura)	Sinhasivali	Amitodana	Ghattitdana Dhotodana; Sukkodana Pamita	Pajapati (Note: Same Person)	Pajapati Suddhodana	Maya (Note: Same Person)	Amita	Suppabuddha	Pajapati (Note: Same Person)	Maya (Note: Same Person)	Dandapani
Kuveni	Prince Vijaya (543–505 BC)	Vijaya of Pandava (Note: King of Madhura)	Other Issues	Sumitta (Note: King of Sinhapura)	Princess of Madha	Pandu	Susima	Siddhartha	Subhaddakacchana	Devadatta
Jivatissa	Dissala	Other Issue	Panduvasdeva (504–474 BC)	Bhaddakacchana	Dighaya	Rama Uruvela; Anuradha Vigita; Rohana Gamani	Rāhula
Vedda people	Other Issue	Abhaya (474–454 BC)	Tissa (454–437 BC)	Girikandasiva	Chittra	Dighagamani
Suvannapali	Pandukabhaya (437–367 BC)
Mutasiva of Anuradhapura (367–307 BC)
Devanampiya Tissa (307–267 BC)	Uttiya (267–257 BC)	Mahanaga	Anula	Mahasiva (257–247 BC)	Suratissa (247–237 BC)	Asela (215–205 BC)	Mattabhaya	Asoka	Uddhachulabhaya
Son	Uttara Devi	Yatala Tissa
Uttiya	Kelani Tissa	Gothabhaya
Vihara Devi	Kakavanna Tissa	Second wife
Dutugamunu (161–137 BC)	Anula	Saddha Tissa (137–119 BC)	Dighabhaya
Asokamala	Saliya	Thulatthana (119–119 BC)	Lanja Tissa (119–109 BC)	Khallata Naga (109–104 BC)	Anuladevi	Valagamba (104–103 BC) (89–76 BC)	Somadevi
Mahakuli Mahatissa (76–62 BC)	Chora Naga (62–50 BC)	Anula (47–42 BC)	Mahanaga	Siva I (47 BC) (Note: Consort to Anula)	Vatuka (47 BC) (Note: Consort to Anula)	Darubhatika Tissa (47 BC) (Note: Consort to Anula)	Niliya (47 BC) (Note: Consort to Anula)
Kuda Tissa (50–47 BC)	Kutakanna Tissa (42–20 BC)
Bhatikabhaya Abhaya (20 BC–9 AD)	Mahadathika Mahanaga (9–21)
Amandagamani Abhaya (21–30)	Kanirajanu Tissa (30–33)
Chulabhaya (33–35)	Sivali (35–35)
Ilanaga (38–44)	Mahamatta
Chandamukha (44–52)	Yassalalaka Tissa (52–60)

== See also ==
- Sinhapura
- Shakya

== Bibliography ==
- Blaze, L. E (1995). The Story of Lanka. Asian Educational Services. ISBN 978-81-206-1074-3.
- Moratuwagama, H. M. (1996). සිංහල ථුපවංසය—Sinhala Thupavansaya [Sinhala Thupavamsa] (in Sinhala). Rathna Publishers. ISBN 978-955-569-068-3.
- Perera, Lakshman S. (2001). The Institutions of Ancient Ceylon from Inscriptions. Vol. 1. International Centre for Ethnic Studies. ISBN 978-955-580-055-6.
- Senaveratna, John M. (1997). The story of the Sinhalese. New Delhi: Asian Educational Series. ISBN 81-206-1271-X.
- Siriweera, W. I. (2004). History of Sri Lanka. Dayawansa Jayakodi & Company. ISBN 978-955-551-257-2.
- Wijesooriya, S. (2006). A Concise Sinhala Mahavamsa. Participatory Development Forum. ISBN 978-955-9140-31-3.
- Yogasundaram, Nath (2008). A Comprehensive History of Sri Lanka. Vijitha Yapa Publishers. ISBN 978-955-665-002-0.

Royal house House of Vijaya
Preceded by None	Ruling house of the Sinhala Kingdom; 543 BC – 237 BC	Succeeded by Sena and Guttika
Preceded by Sena and Guttika	Ruling house of the Sinhala Kingdom; 215 – 205 BC	Succeeded by Ellalan
Preceded by Ellalan	Ruling house of the Sinhala Kingdom; 161 – 103 BC	Succeeded by The Five Dravidians
Preceded by The Five Dravidians	Ruling house of the Sinhala Kingdom; 89 BC – 66 AD	Succeeded by House of Lambakanna I
