= Yatala Tissa, Prince of Ruhuna =

Yatala Tissa
- Ruler of Ruhuna
- Reign: Unknown
- Predecessor: Mahanaga
- Successor: Gothabhaya
- House: House of Vijaya
- Dynasty: Shakya
- Father: Mahanaga

Yatala Tissa was an early monarch of Sri Lanka of the Kingdom of Ruhuna in the southern region of the island. The Kingdom of Ruhuna was a subkingdom loyal to the King of Anuradhapura.

== See also ==
- List of monarchs of Sri Lanka
- List of Ruhuna monarchs

Yatala Tissa, Prince of Ruhuna Born: ? ? Died: ? 109 BC
Regnal titles
Preceded by Mahanaga	Count of Ruhuna; 2nd century BC;	Succeeded by Ghotabaya
