= Mahasiva =

Mahasiva මහාසිව
- King of Anuradhapura
- Reign: 257 BC – 247 BC
- Predecessor: Uttiya
- Successor: Suratissa
- Died: 247 BC
- House: Vijaya
- Father: Mutasiva
- Religion: Buddhism

Mahasiva (Sinhala:මහාසිව) was an early monarch of Sri Lanka of the kingdom of Anuradhapura, based at the ancient capital of Anuradhapura from 257 BC to 247 BC according to historical records. Mahasiva was one of the many sons of Mutasiva and also brother of monarchs Devanampiya Tissa, Uttiya and Asela.

Not much is known about him or his reign. He was noted to have given favor towards the monk Bhaddasala, building a temple in honor of him in the city of Anuradhapura.

== See also ==
- List of Sri Lankan monarchs

Mahasiva Vijaya Born: ? ? Died: ? ?
Regnal titles
Preceded by Uttiya	King of Anuradhapura; 257 BC–247 BC	Succeeded by Suratissa
