= Sena and Guttika =

- King of Anuradhapura
- Reign: 237 BC – 215 BC
- Predecessor: Suratissa
- Successor: Asela

Sena and Guttika were two Tamil horse traders thought to be from South India who killed and usurped the throne of the reigning Anuradhapura king Suratissa. They reigned for 22 years from 237 BC to 215 BC. Suratissa's nephew Asela defeated them and retook the Sinhalese throne.

== See also ==
- List of monarchs of Sri Lanka

Sena and Guttika Born: ? ? Died: ? ?
Regnal titles
Preceded by Suratissa	King of Anuradhapura; 237 BC – 215 BC	Succeeded by Asela
