= Asela of Anuradhapura =

Asela අසේල
- King of Anuradhapura
- Reign: 215 BC – 205 BC
- Predecessor: Sena and Guttika
- Successor: Ellalan
- Died: 205 BC
- House: Vijaya
- Father: Mutasiva
- Religion: Theravāda Buddhism

Asela (Sinhala:අසේල) was an early monarch of Sri Lanka of the Kingdom of Anuradhapura, based at the ancient capital of Anuradhapura from 215 BC to 205 BC. He was the youngest of the many sons of Mutasiva and brother of previous monarchs Devanampiya Tissa, Uttiya and Mahasiva. Asela fought Sena and Guttika in a battle to re-establish Vijaya rule in 215 BC, but in 205 BC the kingdom of Anuradhapura was again invaded by a Tamil king from the Chola Dynasty named Ellalan, who killed Asela and ruled Anuradhpura kingdom for 44 years.

== See also ==
- List of Sri Lankan monarchs

Asela of Anuradhapura Born: ? ? Died: ? 205 BC
Regnal titles
| Preceded by Sena and Guttika | King of Anuradhapura; 215 BC–205 BC | Succeeded by Ellalan |
