= The Five Dravidians =

1st century BC Tamil chiefs of the Anuradhapura Kingdom

- Country: Anuradhapura Kingdom
- Founded: 103 BC
- Founder: Pulahatta
- Final ruler: Dathika
- Titles: King of Anuradhapura
- Deposition: 88 BC

The Five Dravidians were five Tamil Chiefs apparently from the Pandyan Dynasty who ruled the Anuradhapura Kingdom for 14 years from 103 BC to 88 BC.

== Background ==
Before the Five Dravidians invaded the island, the Anuradhapura Kingdom was ruled by Valagamba (104–103 BC, 89–76 BC) also known as Vatthagamani Abhaya. In 103 BC Valagamba was overthrown by these five conquerors from South India, who ruled until 89 BC when they were defeated by Valagamba, who was then able to rule his kingdom once more.

== Rulers ==
=== Pulahatta ===
Pulahatta
- King of Anuradhapura
- Reign: 103 BC – 100 BC
- Predecessor: Valagamba
- Successor: Bahiya
- Died: 100 BC

Pulahatta was the first of the Five Dravidians. He was a Tamil chief from the Pandyan Dynasty, in South India, who defeated the reigning monarch Valagamba, who had only come to the throne five months before. He appointed Bahiya as his Chief Minister and reigned for three years until he was murdered in 100 BC by Bahiya.

=== Bahiya ===
Bahiya
- King of Anuradhapura
- Reign: 100 BC – 98 BC
- Predecessor: Pulahatta
- Successor: Panya Mara
- Died: 98 BC

Bahiya was the second of the Five Dravidians, he ruled from 100 BC to 98 BC. Chief Minister of Pulahatha, during Pulahatha's reign, he murdered him and ruled as king. Bahiya's reign came to an end when his Prime Minister, Panya Mara, killed him after only two years on the throne.

=== Panya Mara ===
Panya Mara
- King of Anuradhapura
- Reign: 98 BC – 91 BC
- Predecessor: Bahiya
- Successor: Pilaya Mara
- Died: 91 BC

Panya Mara, the third of the Five Dravidians reigned from 98 BC to 91 BC, the longest of any of the Five Dravidians. Before ascending the throne he held the office of Prime Minister under Bahiya, whom Panya Mara then killed taking the throne while appointing Pilaya Mara as his Chief Minister.

=== Pilaya Mara ===
Pilaya Mara
- King of Anuradhapura
- Reign: 91 BC – 90 BC
- Predecessor: Panya Mara
- Successor: Dathika
- Died: 90 BC

Pilaya Mara was King of Anuradhapura from 91 BC to 90 BC. Assuming the throne like his predecessors, by murdering Panya Mara, while he was his Chief Minister. Pilaya Mara had the shortest of all the reigns of the Five Dravidians only lasting seven months, being killed by his own Chief Minister, Dathika.

=== Dathika ===
Dathika
- King of Anuradhapura
- Reign: 90 BC – 88 BC
- Predecessor: Pilaya Mara
- Successor: Valagamba
- Died: 88 BC

Dathika was the last of the Five Dravidians, who ruled for two years from 90 BC to 88 BC. Dathika came to the throne after murdering his king Pilaya Mara, for whom he was Chief Minister. In 88 BC he was defeated, losing the throne, by Valagamba restoring his reign and the dynasty of the House of Vijaya who had reigned since the start of the monarchy. Valagamba went on to rule the Anuradhapura Kingdom for the next 12 years.

== See also ==
- List of Sri Lankan monarchs
- History of Sri Lanka
- Mahavamsa
