= Pandukabhaya =

King of Anuradhapura from 437 to 367 BC

Pandukabhaya පණ්ඩුකාභය
- King of Anuradhapura
- Reign: 437 BC – 367 BC
- Coronation: 437 BC
- Predecessor: Tissa
- Successor: Mutasiva
- Predecessor: Prince Tissa
- Successor: Mutasiva
- Born: 474 BC; Upatissa Nuwara
- Died: 367 BC (aged 106–107)
- Consort: Princess Swarnapali
- Issue: 10 sons and two daughters Mutasiva; Suratissa
- House: Vijaya
- Father: Dighagamini
- Mother: Unmadachithra
- Religion: Nirgrantha (according to Mahavamsa)

Pandukabhaya (Sinhala: පණ්ඩුකාභය) was a king of Upatissa Nuwara and the first monarch of the Anuradhapura Kingdom. Pandukabhaya reigned from 437 BC to 367 BC. According to many historians and philosophers, he is considered the first truly Sri Lankan king, and the ruler who ended the conflict between the Sinha clan and the local clans, reorganizing the population. Pandukabhaya was mentored by Pandula and Pandula's son Chandra was his advisor.

== Early life ==
Pandukabhaya was the only child of Princess Unmadachithra (daughter of King Panduvasdew and Queen Baddhakachchana) and Prince Dighagamini (son of Prince Digayu and Princess Disala).

Astrologers of Anuradhapura kingdom had predicted that Princess Umandachitra would give birth to a child who would murder her brothers so King Panduwasdeva locked Umandachitra in a building, isolating her from the outside world. Prince Dighagamini arrived at Upatissa gama and heard about the princess. He broke into the building to see the princess and later they met secretly and she gave birth to Prince Pandukabhaya.

Due to the astrologers' advice and also for his own protection, Pandukabhaya was exchanged with a princess and raised in a village called Doramadalawa. His uncles later became aware of his existence and sent forces to kill him but he was able to escape with his life several times.

A brahmin called Pandula knew of the prince's identity and taught him the necessary skills to become a king, even providing him an army, which the prince stationed them in Kasagala.

== Battles with his uncles ==
The brahmin Pandula had predicted that, Princess Pali, the daughter of Pandukabhaya's uncle, Girikandasiva, would become his queen. Pandukabhaya entered his uncle's land where she was taking rice to some of the farmers. Prince Pandukabhaya approached here.

When Girikandasiva heard that Pandukabhaya had taken his daughter, he was furious and assembled his soldiers to wage war on the prince but he was defeated. Five more of Pandukabhaya’s uncles also waged war against him but all five were defeated. Princess Unmadachitra's brothers also organized several armies against prince Pandukabhaya. They camped at a place called Dhooma Rakha. Prince Pandukabhaya faced them and forced them to flee to the other side of the river. Due to the setbacks, one of the brothers agreed to hand over the eastern part of the river to the prince. More of Unmadachitra's brothers rose up against the prince. Prince Pandukabhaya placed his camps in different places such as Dhooma Rakha, Ritigala and continued fighting against his uncles. Finally, with the support of the Yaksha tribal woman called Chathiya, he defeated them all.

== Establishing of a new kingdom ==
Prince Pandukabhaya arrived in Anuradhagama, a name given to it by Vijaya’s minister Anuradha. Pandukabhaya established a kingdom called the Anuradhapura kingdom. Chandra, son of the brahmin Pandula, was appointed as the king's chief advisor. Pandukabhaya's other close allies were also awarded with high rank positions.

Pandukabhaya established an organized system of governance. He deployed scavengers to keep the city clean, built one of the oldest hospitals, and built the first reservoir in the Anuradhapura kingdom, called the Abaya Wewa. Pandukabhaya created a position called "nagara gutthika" to rule the city, to which he appointed his uncle Abhaya.

In his tenth year as king, he ordered the demarcation of all the villages on the island; the first king to do this.

== Personal life ==
Queen Swanapali (or Swarnamali Devi, née Pali) was the spouse of King Pandukabhaya. She was the daughter of prince Girikandasiva, a powerful son of King Panduvasdeva with eight brothers. The legend is that, when she first met Prince Pandukabhaya, she was served food to him on a Lotus leaf, and the leaf turned golden. Because of this incident, princess Pali came to be known as Swarnapali (swarna means "gold").

== Popular culture ==
- Aba, a 2008 film based on the historical legend of King Pandukabhaya

== See also ==
- List of Sri Lankan monarchs
- History of Sri Lanka

Pandukabhaya Vijaya Died: 367 BC
Regnal titles
Preceded by Tissa	King of Anuradhapura; 437 BC–367 BC	Succeeded by Mutasiva
