= Lovamahapaya =

Temple in Sri Lanka

Coordinates: 08°20′46″N 80°23′52″E

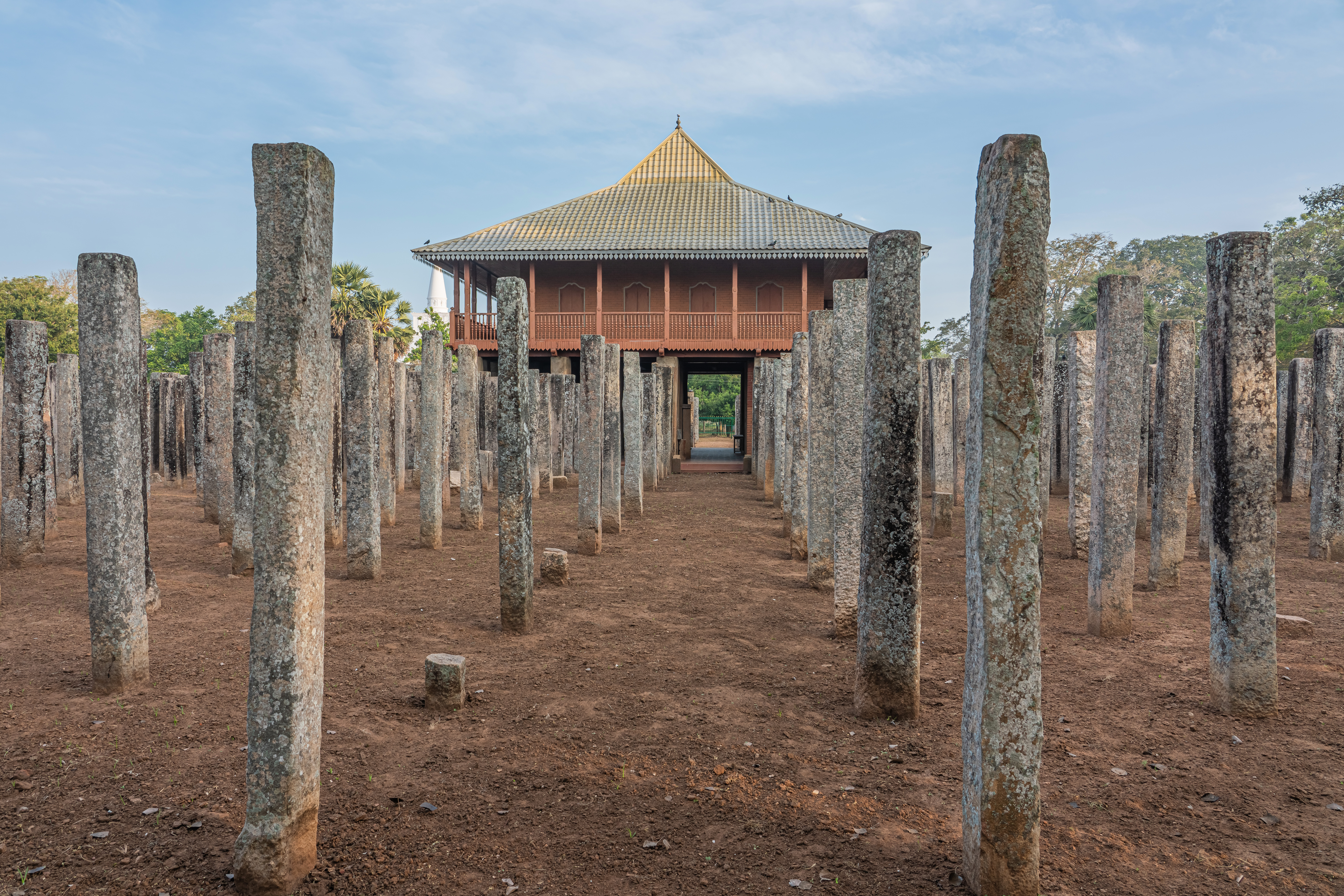
Lovamahapaya

Lovamahapaya is a building situated between Ruwanweliseya and Sri Mahabodiya in the ancient city of Anuradhapura, Sri Lanka. It is also known as the Brazen Palace or Lohaprasadaya because the roof was covered with bronze tiles.

In ancient times the site contained a uposathagara built by king Devanampiya Tissa after the destruction of the building the existing building was constructed. The building included the refectory and the uposathagara (Uposatha house). There was also a Simamalake where the Sangha assembled on Poya days to recite the sutra of the confessional. The famous Lohaprasada built by King Dutugemunu, described as an edifice of nine stories, was a building of this class. One side of the building was 120 metres (400 feet) in length. There are 40 rows, each row consisting of 40 stone pillars, for a total of 1600 pillars. It is said that Lovamahapaya was adorned with corals and precious stones. It is believed that it took six years for the construction of the building and the plan was brought from the heavens. The building was completely destroyed during the reign of King Saddhatissa.

Whilst the Jetavanaramaya, Abhayagiriya and Ruwanwelisaya were taller structures, the Lovamahapaya remained the tallest building of the island for over a millennium between 155 BC and 993 AD. The small building displayed now is a recent construction and is the Venue of Uposatha (chapter house) of the Maha Vihara even now.

== See also ==
- Atamasthana
