= Uttiya =

King of Anuradhapura from 267 BC to 257 BC

Uttiya උත්තිය
- King of Anuradhapura; Maharaja ^{(note 1)} Devanapiya
- Reign: 267 BC – 257 BC
- Predecessor: Devanampiya Tissa
- Successor: Mahasiva
- Died: 257 BC
- Spouse: Sumanadevī; Anurādhī ^{(note 2)}
- Issue: Uttara Devi, Queen Consort of Kelaniya; Tissā
- House: Vijaya
- Father: Mutasiva
- Mother: Unknown
- Religion: Theravāda Buddhism

Uttiya (Sinhala: උත්තිය, [uttijə]) was an early monarch of Sri Lanka of the Kingdom of Anuradhapura, based at the ancient capital of Anuradhapura from 267 BC to 257 BC. As Devanampiya Tissa had no son, his brother Uttiya succeeded to the throne.

The death of Arahat Mahinda, who had brought Theravāda Buddhism to Sri Lanka occurred in king Uttiya's reign period. The king held a grand funeral, and built a chetiya where Arahat Mahinda was cremated. Theri Sangamitta also died; her funeral was conducted with similar grandeur, and a stupa was erected at the place of her cremation.

== See also ==
- List of Sri Lankan monarchs

== Notes ==
1.Sinhala: මහරජ, lit. 'Great King', [maharadʒə]; Should not be confused with the Hindu and Sikh princely title "Maharaja".
2.see, King Devanampiya Tissa (306 BC – 266 BC) www.mahavamsa.org

Uttiya Vijaya Born: ? ? Died: ? ?
Regnal titles
Preceded by Devanampiya Tissa	King of Anuradhapura; 267 BC–257 BC	Succeeded by Mahasiva
