= Devanampiya Tissa =

King of Anuradhapura from 307 BC to 267 BC

Devanampiya Tissa දේවානම්පිය තිස්ස
- Maharaja ^{A} ^{B} Devanampiya
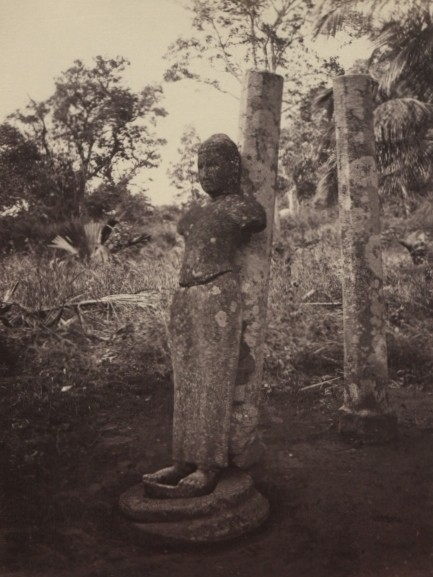
- Mihintale Stone Statue of King Tissa

King of Anuradhapura
- Reign: 307 BC – 267 BC or 247 BC – 207 BC
- Predecessor: Mutasiva
- Successor: Uttiya
- Died: 267 BC or 207 BC
- Consort: Ramadattha
Names
- Tissa; Gamiṇi Tissa
- House: House of Vijaya
- Dynasty: House of Vijaya
- Father: Mutasiva
- Religion: Theravāda Buddhism

Tissa, later Devanampiya Tissa (Sinhala: දේවානම්පිය තිස්ස, lit. 'Loved by Gods', [ˈdeːʋaːnampijə t̪issə]), also known as Devanape Tis (Sinhala: දෙවනපෑ තිස්, [ˈdeʋənəpǣ t̪is]), was one of the earliest kings of Sri Lanka based at the ancient capital of Anuradhapura. According to the traditional chronology, he ruled from 307 BC to 267 BC, but the modified chronology adopted by modern scholars such as Wilhelm Geiger assigns his reign to 247 BC to 207 BC. His reign was notable for the arrival of Buddhism in Sri Lanka under the aegis of the Mauryan Emperor Ashoka the Great. The primary source for his reign is the Mahavamsa, which in turn is based on the more ancient Dipavamsa.

== Reign ==
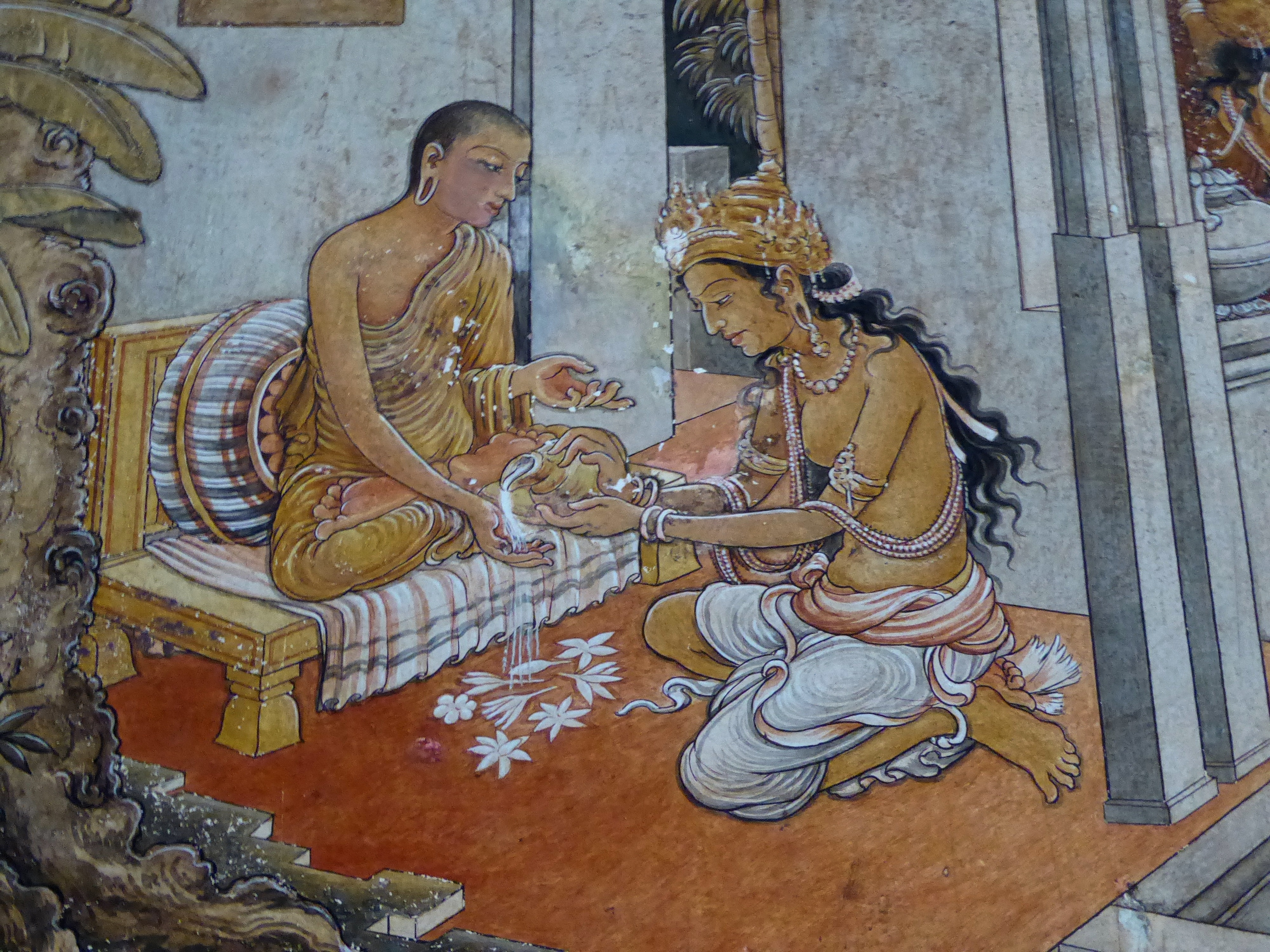
Devanampiyatissa donates the Maha Megha Monastery

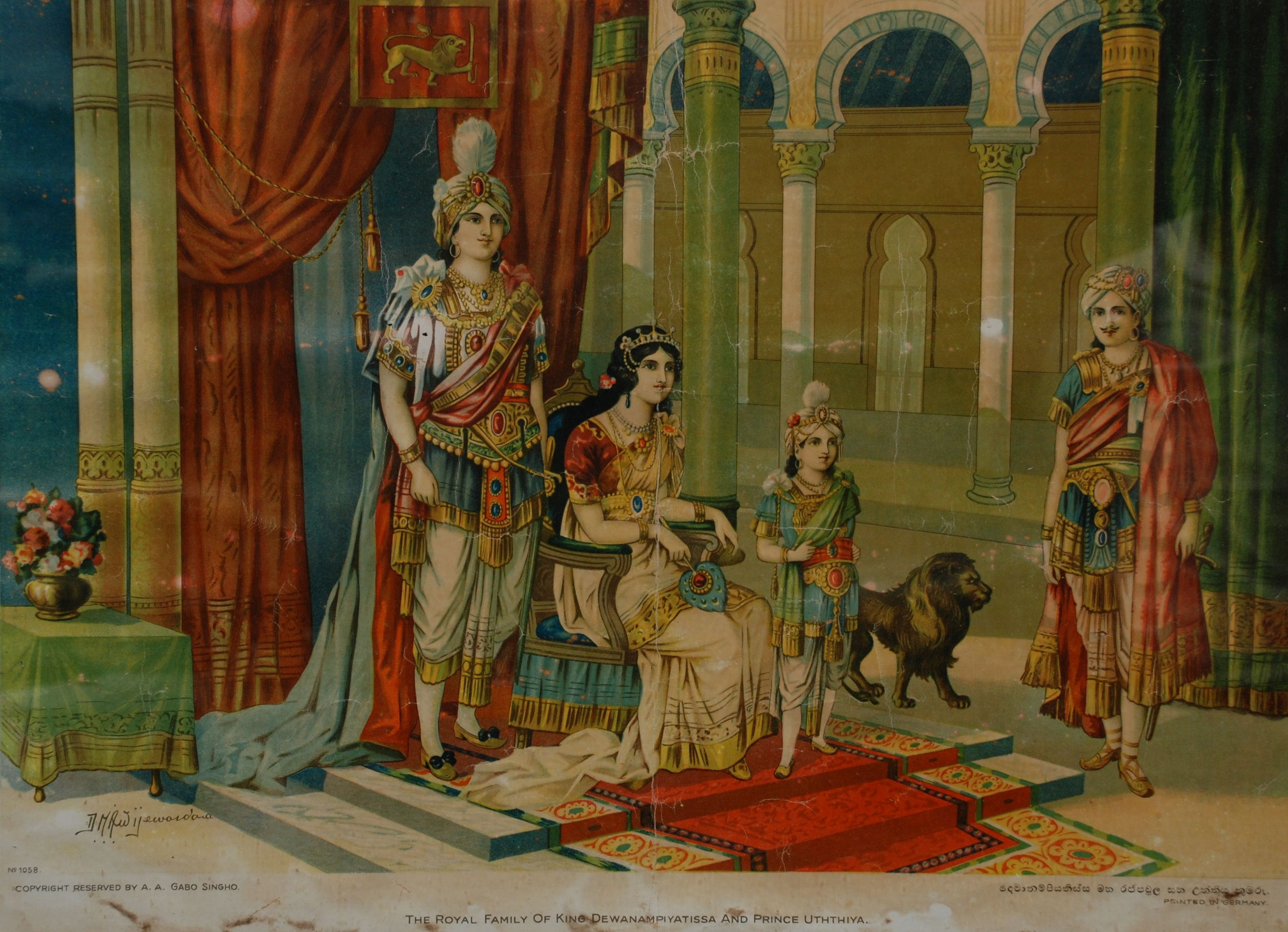
The Sinhalese Royal Family of King Devanampiya Tissa and Prince Uththiya

Tissa was the second son of Mutasiva of Anuradhapura. The Mahavamsa describes him as being "foremost among all his brothers in virtue and intelligence".

The Mahavamsa mentions an early friendship with Ashoka. Chapter IX of the chronicle mentions that "the two monarchs, Devanampiyatissa and Dharmasoka, already had been friends a long time, though they had never seen each other", Dharmasoka being an alternate name for Ashoka. The chronicle also mentions Tissa sending gifts to the mighty emperor of the Maurya; in reply, Ashoka sent not only gifts but also the news that he had converted to Buddhism, and a plea to Tissa to adopt the faith as well. The king does not appear to have done this at the time, instead adopting the name Devānaṃpiya "Beloved of the Gods"and having himself consecrated King of Lanka in a lavish celebration.

Devanampiyatissa is traditionally said to have been succeeded by his younger brothers Uttiya and Mahasiva. His other brother Mahanaga, Prince of Ruhuna was the founder of the Principality of Ruhuna.

== Second Coronation ==
In 306 BC, King Devanampiya Tissa was crowned at the Royal Mandapa for the second time at the request of Emperor Ashoka.

== Conversion to Buddhism ==
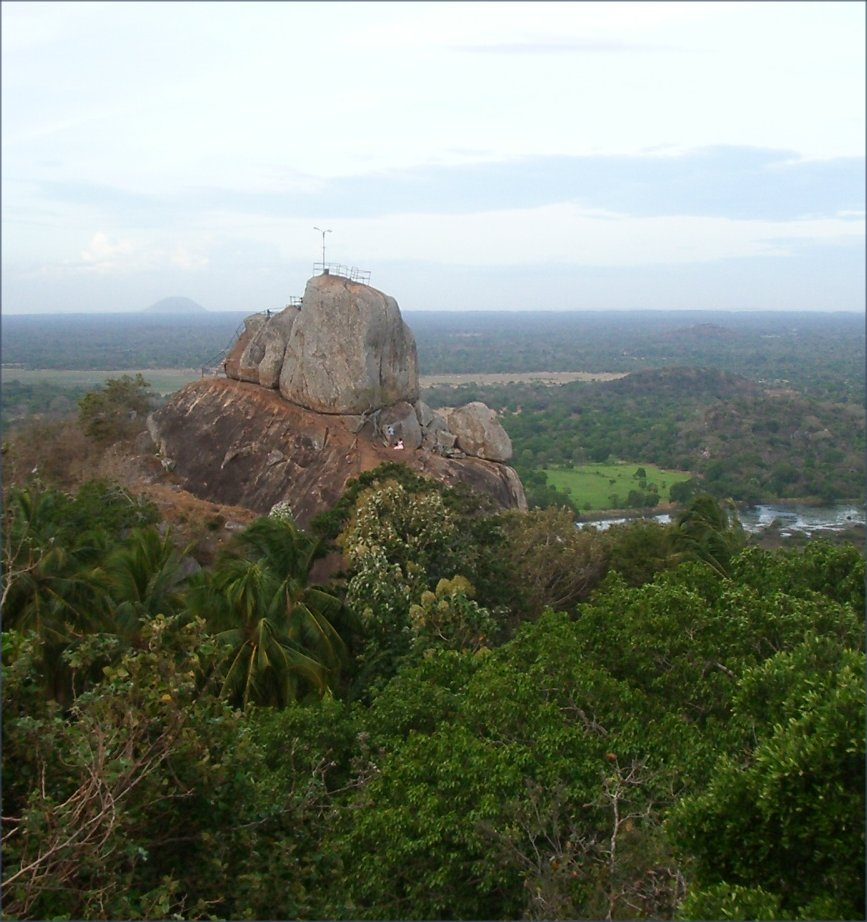
Mihintale, the traditional location of Devanampiya Tissa's conversion

Emperor Ashoka took an interest in the propagation of Buddhism across the known world. According to Sri Lankan tradition, it was decided that his son, Mahinda, would travel to Sri Lanka and attempt to convert the people there. The events surrounding Mahinda's arrival and meeting with the king form one of the most important legends of Sri Lankan history.

According to the Mahavamsa King Devanampiyatissa was out enjoying a hunt with some 40,000 of his soldiers near a mountain called Mihintale. The date for this is traditionally associated with the full moon day of the month of Poson.

Having come to the foot of Missaka, Devanampiyatissa chased a stag into the thicket, and came across Mahinda (referred to with the honorific title Thera); the Mahavamsa has the great king 'terrified' and convinced that the Thera was in fact a 'yakka', or demon. However, Thera Mahinda declared that 'Recluses we are, O great King, disciples of the King of Dhamma (Buddha) Out of compassion for you alone have we come here from Jambudipa'. Devanampiyatissa recalled the news from his friend Ashoka and realised that these are missionaries sent from India. Mahinda wanted to test the intelligence of the king so he asked him these questions:

" What name does this tree bear. O king?" he asked.

"This tree is called a mango," replied Devanampiya Tissa.

"Is there yet another mango besides this?"

"There are many mango-trees."

And are there yet other trees besides this mango and the other mangoes”

"There are many trees, Sir. but those are trees that are not mangoes."

"And are there, beside the other mangoes and those trees which are not mangoes, yet other trees?"

"There is this mango tree, Sir."

" Thou hast a shrewd wit, O ruler of men," said Mahinda.

Again Mahinda questioned him.

"Hast thou kinsfolk, O king?"

"They are many, Sir."

"And are there also some, O king, who are not kinsfolk of thine?"

"There are yet more of those than of my kin."

" Is there yet any one besides the kinsfolk and the others ?"

"There is yet myself, Sir."

"Good I thou hast a shrewd wit, O ruler of men," said Mahinda

Thera Mahinda went on to preach to the king's company and preside over the king's conversion to Buddhism.

== Coming of Sanghamitta ==
Mahinda requested the king to write to Asoka, asking him to send his sister Sanghamitta together with other nuns to visit Lanka and to bring with her a branch of the great Bo tree of the Buddha. Sanghamitta arrived on Sri Lanka with the Bo tree and it was planted in Mahamegha park.

== Notable locations ==
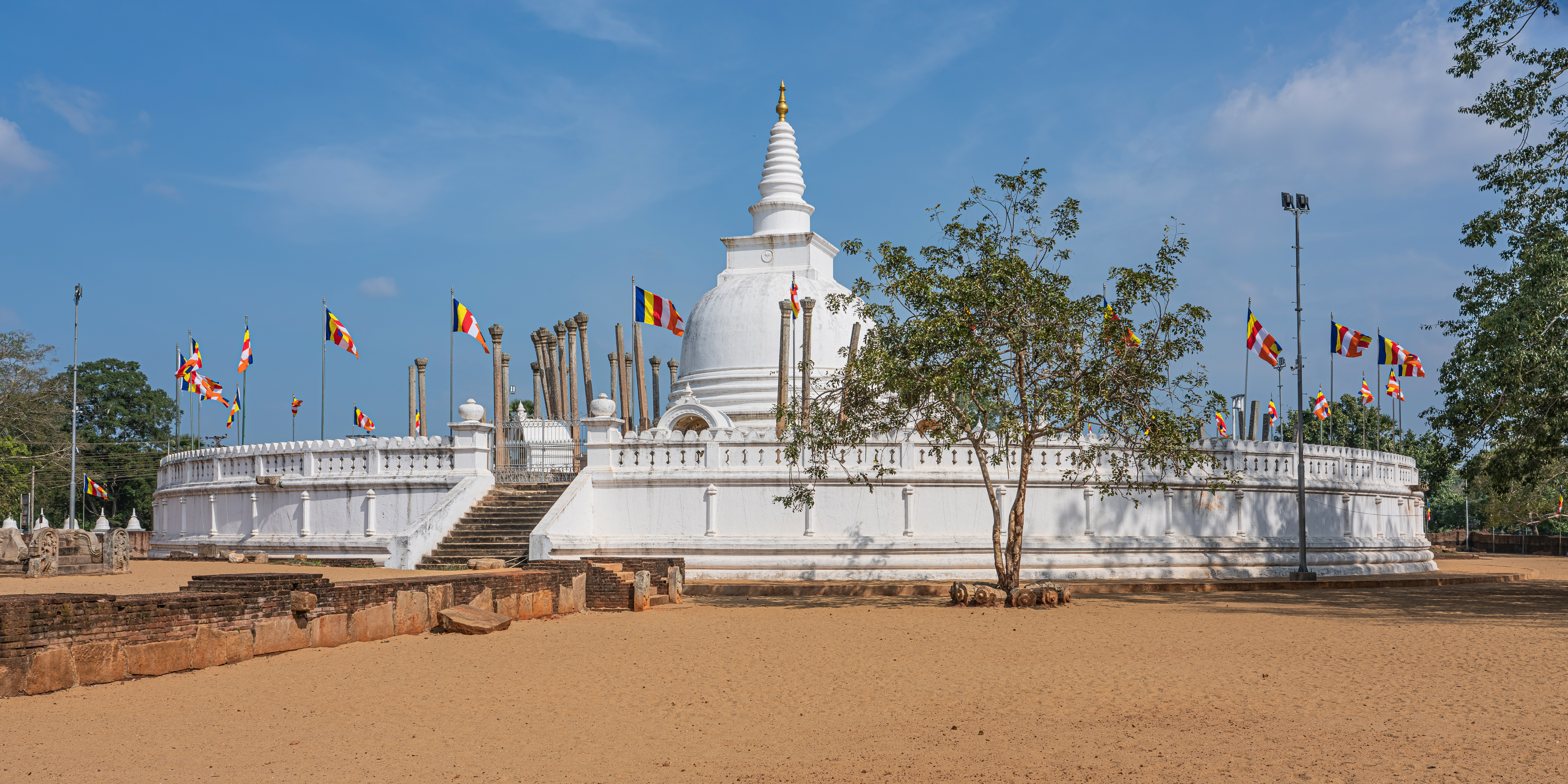
Thuparama in Anuradhapura, believed to have been constructed in Devanampiya Tissa's reign

Given the extremely early date of Devanampiyatissa's reign and the dearth of sources, it is difficult to discern what impact this conversion had, in practical terms, on Devanampiyatissa's reign. For example, whilst there are references to a Tissamahavihara and various other temples constructed by the king, none can be reliably located.

What is fairly certain however is that the site of his initial meeting with Thera Mahinda is one of Sri Lanka's most sacred sites today, going by the name Mihintale. The sacred precinct features the Ambasthala, or 'Mango tree stupa', where Thera Mahinda asked the king a series of riddles to check his capacity for learning, the cave in which Thera Mahinda lived for over forty years, and the Maha Seya, wherein is contained a relic of the Buddha.

The other major site associated with Devanampiyatissa's reign is the planting of the Sri Maha Bodhi in Anuradhapura. The tree was yet another of Emperor Ashoka's gifts to the island and was planted within the precincts of Anuradhapura, and is regarded as the oldest human planted tree in the world.

Devanampiyatissa built Tissa Wewa, which covers 550 acres. The embankment alone is 2 miles long and 25 feet high. It is a major irrigation tank even today and is an essential resource for farmers in Anuradhapura.

== Works by the King ==
Name	Date of construction	Description
Thuparamaya	307 BC – 267 BC or 247 BC – 207 BC	First historical Stupa which enshrined the right collar bone of the Buddha.
Maha viharaya	307 BC – 267 BC or 247 BC – 207 BC	First and large magnitude of viharaya built.
Cetiya Viharaya	307 BC – 267 BC or 247 BC – 207 BC	Mahinda Thera and the other monks use the premise during rainy weather.
Hatthalhaka Viharaya	307 BC – 267 BC or 247 BC – 207 BC	For the use of nuns when other temples exceed.
Isurumuniya Viharaya	307 BC – 267 BC or 247 BC – 207 BC	Location which the regent prince Maharitta and 500 more aristocrats were ordained.
Jambukola Viharaya	307 BC – 267 BC or 247 BC – 207 BC	Constructed in historical region of Rajarata.
Kala pasada parivena	307 BC – 267 BC or 247 BC – 207 BC	Building was used by monk Mahinda.
Loha pasada	307 BC – 267 BC or 247 BC – 207 BC	After the destruction of the building the brazen palace was built as a replacement.
Mahinda's cave	307 BC – 267 BC or 247 BC – 207 BC	Mahinda used this place to rest.
Pacinarama	307 BC – 267 BC or 247 BC – 207 BC	Location where the Bo tree was kept before returning to Anuradhapura.
Pathama cetiya	307 BC – 267 BC or 247 BC – 207 BC	First Buddhist structure built on the island on the location where Mahinda landed.
Tissamaharama Maha Vihara	307 BC – 267 BC or 247 BC – 207 BC	One of the largest stupas in Sri Lanka.
Tissa wewa	307 BC – 267 BC or 247 BC – 207 BC	Reservoir.

== See also ==
- Mahavamsa
- List of Sri Lankan monarchs
- History of Sri Lanka
- Buddhism in Sri Lanka

== Notes ==
A.Sinhala: මහරජ, lit. 'Great King', Sinhala pronunciation: [maharadʒə]
B. Should not be confused with the Hindu and Sikh princely title Maharaja.

Devanampiya Tissa Vijaya Born: ? ? Died: ? ?
Regnal titles
Preceded by Mutasiva	King of Anuradhapura; 307 BC–267 BC	Succeeded by Uttiya
