= Sanghamitta =

Daughter (Sri Lankan Tradition) of Emperor Ashoka

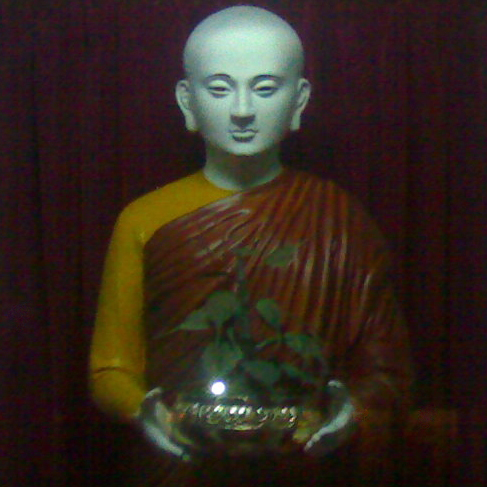
- Arahath Sangamitta Theri Statue at a Monastery in Sri Lanka

Personal life
- Born: 282 BC Ujjeni, Avantirastra, Maurya Empire, (Present day Madhya Pradesh, India)
- Died: 203 BC (aged c. 78 – 79) Anuradhapura Kingdom, (Present day Sri Lanka)
- Resting place: Sri Lanka
- Spouse: Aggibrahmā
- Children: Son – Sumana
- Parents: Ashoka (father); Devi (mother)
- Known for: Establishing a Theravāda Buddhist nunnery in Sri Lanka
- Other names: Saṅghamitrā, (Sanskrit), Aapali(Sanskrit)

Religious life
- Religion: Buddhism
- Sect: Theravada

Saṅghamittā (Saṅghamitrā in Sanskrit, nun's name Ayapali 282 BC – 203 BC) was an Indian Buddhist nun and believed to be the eldest daughter (Sri Lankan Tradition) of Emperor Ashoka (304 BC – 232 BC) from his first wife Queen Devi (302 BCE – 242 BCE). Together with her brother Mahinda, she entered an order of Buddhist monks. The two siblings later went to Sri Lanka to spread the teachings of Buddha at the request of Sri Lankan King Devanampiya Tissa (250 BC – 210 BC) who was a contemporary of Ashoka. Ashoka was initially reluctant to send his daughter (Sri Lankan Tradition) on an overseas mission. However, because of the insistence of Sangamitta herself, he finally agreed. She was sent to Sri Lanka together with several other nuns to start the nun-lineage of Bhikkhunis (a fully ordained female Buddhist monastic) at the request of King Tissa to ordain queen Anulā and other women of Tissa's court at Anuradhapura who desired to be ordained as nuns after Mahinda converted them to Buddhism.

After Sanghamittā’s contribution to the propagation of Buddhism in Sri Lanka and her establishing the Bhikkhunī Sangha or Meheini Sasna (Order of Nuns) there, her name became synonymous with "Buddhist Female Monastic Order of Theravāda Buddhism" that was established not only in Sri Lanka but also in Burma, China and Thailand, in particular. The day the most revered tree, the Bodhi tree, a sapling of which was brought by her to Sri Lanka and planted in Anuradhapura, and which still survives, is also celebrated every year on the Full Moon day of December as Uduvapa Poya or Uposatha Poya and Sanghamittā Day by Theravāda Buddhists in Sri Lanka.

== Background ==
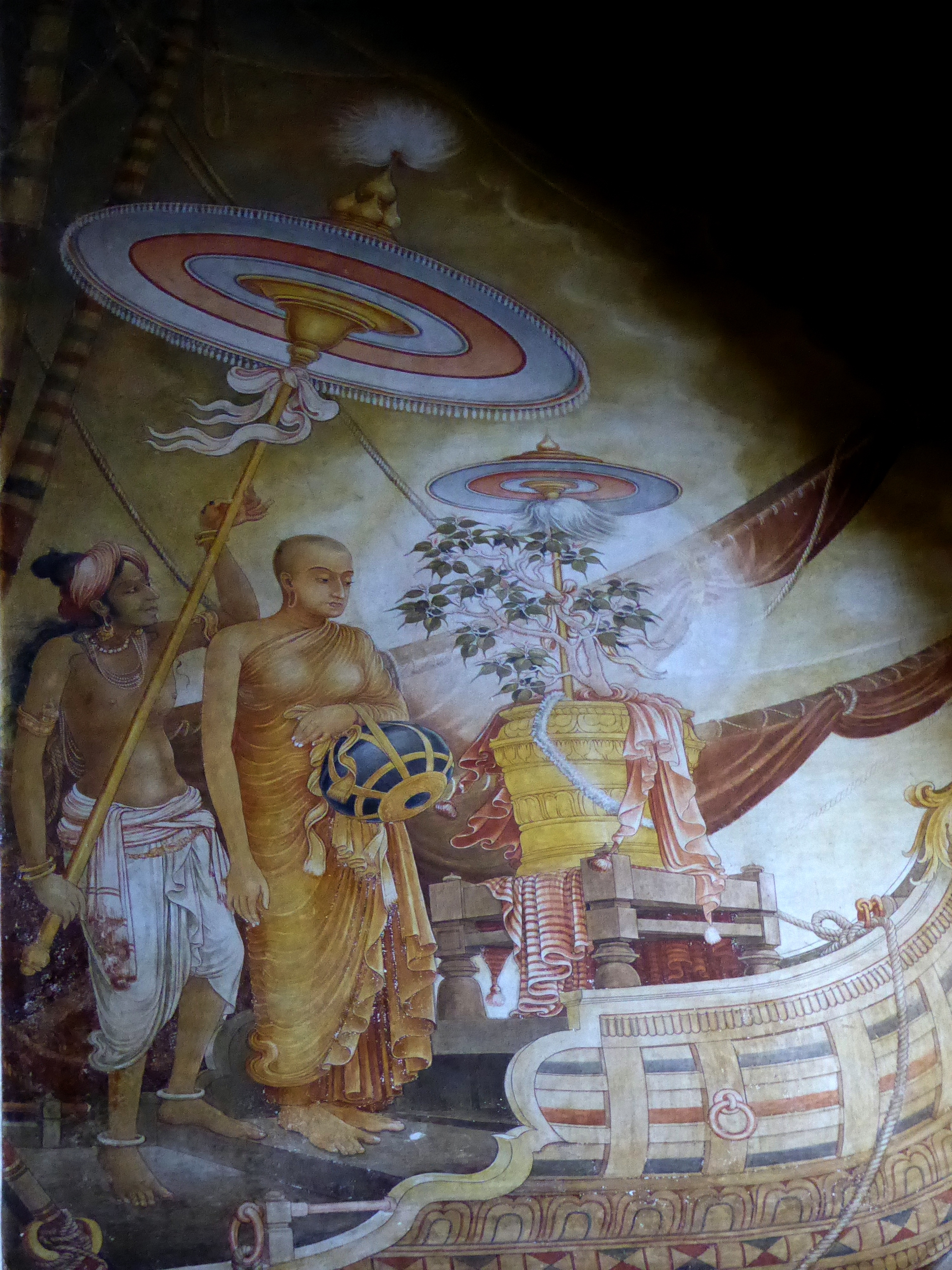
Sanghamitta bringing a sapling of the right branch of the Bodhi tree to Sri Lanka. Kelaniya Raja Maha Vihara

Sanghamitra is known for the proselytisation activity among women that she pursued as her lifetime goal in Sri Lanka, along with her brother, Mahendra (called Mahinda in Sri Lanka) at the initiation of her father, Emperor Ashoka of the Maurya dynasty who ruled in India in the 3rd century BC. Ashoka, after adopting Buddhism, took to spreading tenets of Buddhism in nine other countries of the region. His contemporary in Sri Lanka, King Devanampiya Tissa, in close alliance with Ashoka, saw the arrival of Buddhism in Sri Lanka.

However, before deputing missions abroad in the region around India, Ashoka, in consultation with Venerable Moggaliputta Tissa convened a meeting of the Third Buddhist Council in which 1,000 Arahants participated. The purpose of this council meeting was not only to purge the Sangha of undesirable elements but also to take a view on the proselytisation of Buddhism. Moggaliputta presided over the Council meeting where it was decided to send nine delegations to different regions to spread Buddhism.

King Ashoka then sent out missionaries in nine different directions. The delegation that was sent south to Sri Lanka, at the request of Tissa, was led by Ashoka's son Mahendra. Before taking the long journey, Mahendra sought blessings of his mother. The delegation (considered a diplomatic mission) comprised six other Arhats, namely Ittiya, Uttiya, Sambala, Bhaddasala, young Samanera (nephew of Mahendra) and a Bhanduka (also a cousin of Mahendra). All members of the mission belonged to the royal family, indicating the importance Ashoka attached to spreading Buddhism in Sri Lanka.

This was also considered an opportune moment to spread Buddhism in Sri Lanka since Buddha himself had created awareness of his philosophy and precepts of Buddhism among the royalty and the common people during his three visits to Sri Lanka undertaken in the eight years following his enlightenment. Buddha, during his lifetime, had also created a social structure for the practice of Dhammavinaya or Dhamma (in Sanskrit: Dharma), which comprised the Sangha – order of bhikkhus (monks) and bhikkunis (nuns) to preserve his teachings for posterity. However, it was only King Tissa, realising the poor status of the religion in his country, desired fresh efforts by a delegation from India.

Mahendra arrived with his delegation at Anuradhapura where King Tissa, accompanied by his sister-in-law (brother's wife) Princess Anula with her entourage of 500 women, met him at the Mahamegha Garden. The Mahendra mission was very successful in introducing Buddhism to Sri Lanka. He established the Bhikkhu Order for men. However, thousands of women, starting with Anula, who had converted to Buddhism along with King Tissa, wished to be ordained into the Bhikkuni Order. Mahindra Thera expressed his inability to do so since this ordination had to be performed by a priestess or a Theri Arahat. He therefore advised the King to write to Emperor Ashoka and seek the services of his younger sister Theri Sangamitta, who was "profoundly learned", to be deputed to Sri Lanka for the purpose. He also desired that a sapling of the right branch of the Bodhi Tree (where the Tathagata got his enlightenment) from Bodh Gaya should also be brought by her to Sri Lanka. King Tissa then chose his Minister Prince Arittha (his nephew) for the purpose since the minister had volunteered to go to India on the condition that on his return he would also be ordained into the Bhikkhu Sasana by Thera Mahindra. This was agreed.

== Early life ==
Sangamitta's parents were Emperor Ashoka and his first wife, Devi, who was a Buddhist. Her birth in 282 BC, as popularly known in published texts was as the second child of Ashoka and younger sister of brother Mahindra. She was born in Ujjeini (present day Ujjain in Madhya Pradesh in India). Her mother did not join Ashoka when he was crowned and her two children had embraced Buddhism. She was married at the age of 14 to Agribrahma, a nephew of Emperor Ashoka, who was also an Arhant. She had a son, Saamanera Sumana who also later became an Arhant and went along with his uncle Mahindra to Sri Lanka to preach Buddhism. Her teacher was Ayupala. She was ordained at the age of 18 into the Theravada Buddhism Order by their preceptor Dhammapala. Her brother was also ordained at the same time. With her dedicated perseverance to Dhamma she became an Arhant Theri and resided in Pataliputra (now known as Patna).

== Middle life ==
Mahindra’s mission in Sri Lanka was very successful. Among his new converts was Princess Anula, King Tissa’s sister-in-law who became Sotapanna and requested ordination. King Tissa wrote to Emperor Ashoka to depute Sangamitta for the purpose. Mahindra also wrote to his father to depute his sister Sanghamitta to Sri Lanka as requested by King Tissa.

Following this invitation from the King and also the request made by his son Mahindra, Ashoka sent Sanghamitta with a retinue of 10 other learned bhikkunis (priestesses) to accompany her and to give ordination to Sri Lanka's princess Anula and other women. Ashoka was initially distraught at the prospect of sending his daughter (Sri Lankan Tradition) away but Sangamitta herself persisted that she would like to go to Sri Lanka. She appealed to her father stating:

"Great King! the injunction of my brother is imperative and the women who are to be ordained in Lanka are many; on that account, it is absolutely essential that I should go there.

The purpose was also to establish the Bhikkuni Order to spread Buddhism in that country with the devoted participation and assistance of women. Ashoka finally agreed to send her. She travelled to Sri Lanka by sea carrying a sapling of Bodhi-Tree in a golden vase. She landed at Jambukola in the North. King Tissa himself received Sangamitta and the sapling of the Bodhi Tree with deep veneration. They were then ceremonially escorted by the king and his people to Anuradhapura. They entered at the northern gate of Anuradhapura along a road sprinkled with white sand. The Bodhi sapling was planted with great fanfare in the Mahāmeghavana Grove in Anuradhapura. It is still seen at the same location.

In the Dipavamsa chronicle, the number of nuns who accompanied Sangamitta has been mentioned differently – three figures have been quoted but the figure of 11 including Sangamitta is inferred as the plausible number. The names of the young nuns who accompanied here on the ship were: Uttara, Hema, Pasadpala, Aggimitta, Dasika, Pheggu, Pabbata, Matta, Malla, and Dhammadasiya. In addition, the delegation headed by the Sri Lankan Ambassador Prince Athitha, which returned to Sri Lanka, comprised the Chief priestess Sangamitta and ten other priestesses, eight people of royal lineage of Magadha (Bogut, Sumitta, Sangot, Devgot, Damgot, Hirugot, Sisigot and Jutindhara), eight members of nobility (families of ministers), eight Brahmins, eight Vaishyas (traders), herdsmen, Hyaenna, Sparrow-hawk, Nagas, Yakkas, craftsmen, weavers, potters and many members of other castes.

A legend mentioned related to the journey of Sangamitta to Sri Lanka is that Nagas encircled the Bodhi tree. Sangamitta drove them away by assuming the form of Garuda (half-man half-bird form). Sanghamitta was 32 years of age when she took this journey. Her son Samanera was already in Sri Lanka as he had joined his uncle Mahindra's mission to spread Buddhism. Sangamitta performed the formal Pabbajja ordination of Princess Anula. Anula was the first Sri Lankan woman to be ordained as a bhikkuni; concurrently her companions numbering more than 1000 who were also observing Dasa Sil were bestowed with Pabbajja ordination. This formally created the "first ecclesiastical life of the Bhikkuni Sasana in Sri Lanka". The ordination covered not only the royalty but also common people of various strata of the society. She pursued every effort to enhance the status of women, with sustained devotion, dedication and diligence.

Sangamitta, on arrival at Anuradhapura, was put up initially at the Upasika Viharaya along with the bhikkunis who had accompanied her. An additional 12 buildings (ashramas) were built to accommodate the bhikkunis. Subsequently, the King also built a separate house for Sangamitta known as 'Hathalakha-Vihara' acceding to the request of the nuns to reside in a secluded place where they could exclusively concentrate on devotional religious pursuits.

Dipavamsa, a chronicle written in 400 BC, records that after the Bhikkuni Sangha was established, there was a widespread following in the country among women of all ages and from all levels of society. The women who ordained were highly learned in the scriptures and they readily taught their knowledge of the Vinaya or rules of discipline to others.

=== Bodhi tree and celebrations ===
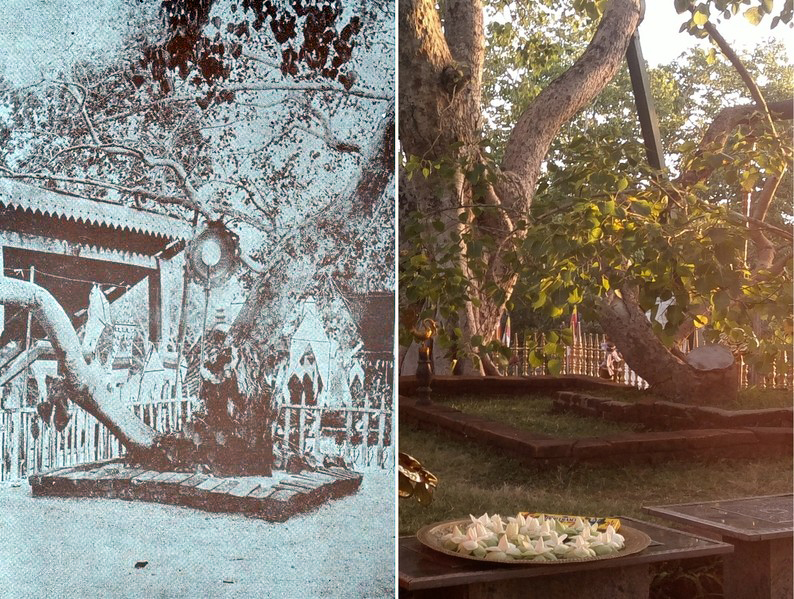
Revered Bodhi tree brought by Sangamitta and planted at Anuradhapura, Sri Lanka -Oldest surviving Bodhi Tree

Sangamittā carried the right south branch of the Bodhi Tree (selected by Ashoka from the Maha Bodhi Tree in Gaya) on a ship to Anurādhapura, during the 12th year of Ashoka's reign. The sapling was planted by Devānāmpiya Tissa in the Mahāmeghavana in Anuradhapura. It seems that "the Buddha, on his death bed, had resolved five things, one being that the branch which should be taken to Ceylon should detach itself". The journey route followed by Sangamitta who carried the tree branch was from Gayā to Pātaliputta and then to Tāmalittī in Bengal. Here, it was placed in a golden vase on the ship and transported to Jambukola across the sea. The entourage reached Anurādhapura, staying en route at Tivakka.

The planting of the Bodhi Tree was a grand ceremony performed by the king himself with assistance from the nobles of Kājaragāma, Candanagāma and Tivakka, in the presence of Sangamitta and her brother Mahindra. The tree took eight roots and yielded fruits and seeds. As fresh eight saplings emerged, they were moved and planted at Jambukola (present Colombogaon in north Sri Lanka), in the village of Tivakka, at Thūpārāmā, at Issaramanārāma, in the court of the Pathamacetiya, in Cetiyagiri, in Kājaragāma and Candanagāma.

The tree, as it stands, is on a raised mound. In 1907, it was 32 feet (9.8 m) in height with 8.17 feet (2.49 m) in girth. The tree and the shrine have been built around a compound wall measuring 61 feet (19 m) x 57 feet (17 m) and 21 feet (6.4 m) in height, primarily to protect the tree and the shrine built around it. Ten more trees of the same species are also seen within precincts of the enclosure. A damaged Buddha statue made of bricks (attributed to its creation during Tissa's rule) is a marker to locate the main Bodhi Tree here. 32 more saplings, from four other fruits, were also planted in the near vicinity.

The Bodhi Tree at Anuradhapura was well tended by successive royal family members of Sri Lanka over the centuries, so much so that a village near Anurādhapura was also earmarked to provide for the maintenance of the tree.

A comment by Historian H. G. Wells on this oldest historical tree in the world, which is well-maintained states:

In Ceylon there grows to this day a tree, the oldest historical tree in the world, which we know certainly to have been planted as a cutting from the Bodhi-Tree in the year 245 BC. From that time to this it has been carefully tended and watered.

== Later life ==
Sangamitta died in 203 BC at the age of 79 in the ninth year of the reign of King Uttiya at her residence in Hatthaloka Upasikaramaya Anuradhapura. Uttiya performed her last rites. The occasion was also marked with observances in her honour throughout Sri Lanka, for one week. She was cremated to the east of the Thūpārāma near the Cittasālā, in front of the Bodhi Tree. The location for the cremation had been selected by the Therī herself before her death. A stupa was erected by Uttiya over her ashes.

== Bhikkhuni Sangha ==
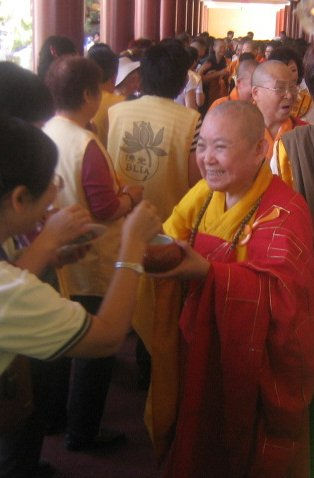
A bhikkuni of the Chinese Mahayana tradition

The Bhikkhuni Sangha (a Dhamma-Vinaya heritage started by Buddha during his lifetime in India), locally known as Bhikkhuni Sasana or Meheini Sasna (Order of Priestesses or Nuns) was established by Sangamitta in Sri Lanka prospered for over 1000 years, till it disappeared in 1017 AD. The reason for such an end is attributed to the invasion of Cholas, Hindu rulers from South India, whereafter Bhikkhus and Bhikkunis were not seen in Sri Lanka for quite some years.

Bhikkuni ordination is the third and ultimate stage of the ordination of nuns; the earlier two stages are the sramanerika (novice) and siksamana (probationary). In India, the Bhikkuni Order was established by Buddha six years after the Bhikkhu Order was established, in the 6th century BC. It was spread to Sri Lanka by Sangamitta in the 3rd BC. Initially, with the spread of Buddhism in ancient India, 18 (eighteen) Vinaya schools developed. However, now only three are extant. These are the Theravada practiced in Sri Lanka and Southeast Asia; the Dharmaguptaka that is practiced in Taiwan, China, Korea, Vietnam and the Philippines; and the third school is the Mulasarvastivada adopted in Tibet.

In 429 AD, Bhikkuni Devasara had realised that Bhikkuni Sanga, on account of war and famine, could vanish from Sri Lanka. She, therefore, had led a mission to China to establish the Bhikkuni Sasana. The original Theravada Bhikkuni lineage established in China since 429 AD has continued to function to this day. However, Asarana Sarana Saranankara Maha Thera re-introduced the Higher Ordination from Thailand. He is credited with re-establishing the Order of Monks in Sri Lanka in 1753 AD. It is now said that there are more than 400 Bhikkunis in the country.

In Thailand, the lineage is well established. A clay statue of Sanghamitta made by Dhammananda in 2002, is deified in a shrine room at Songdhammakalyani Monastery in Nakhonpathom. Her image is flanked by images of 13 Arahat Theris.

It is also reported that a few women from Western countries practising the Theravada tradition and a few women from Thailand have been ordained to bhikkuni order in Sri Lanka in recent years.

== Uduvapa Poya festival ==
Unduvapa Poya festival is observed in Sri Lanka on the Full Moon of December to commemorate two specific events namely, Theri Sangamitta day of arrival from India to establish the Order of Nuns and to also mark her bringing a sapling of the sacred Bodhi-Tree from Bodh Gaya and planting it in Anuradhapura. The festival day has been designated as "Sanghamitta Day". On this day, ten ordained nuns initiate the festive celebrations every year. This observance was revived in 1903 at the suggestion of the Mahabodhi Society of Sri Lanka.

This Observance is performed by Buddhists by first following the 'Five Precepts'; bathing, shaving, wearing white robes, and kneeling with clean bare feet in a shrine before a Buddha statue. The kneeling and bowing are done the first three times with feet, hands, elbows, knees and head touching the floor. This is followed by reciting loudly the memorised prayers, with folded hands (palms at the heart). The prayers offered from sunrise until the next dawn starting with the words are:

As long as this life lasts.

I hereby take refuge in the Buddha.
I hereby take refuge in the Dhamma.
I hereby take refuge in the Sangha.
I hereby seek shelter in the Buddha for the 2nd time.
I hereby seek shelter in the Dhamma for the 2nd time.
I hereby seek shelter in the Sangha for the 2nd time.
I hereby request protection from the Buddha for the 3rd time.
I hereby request protection from the Dhamma for the 3rd time.
I hereby request protection from the Sangha for the 3rd time.
I will hereby respect these Three Jewels the rest of my life!
I accept to respect & undertake these 5 training rules:
I hereby accept the training rule of avoiding all Killing.
I hereby accept the training rule of avoiding all Stealing.
I hereby accept the training rule of avoiding all Sexual Abuse.
I hereby accept the training rule of avoiding all Dishonesty.
I hereby accept the training rule of avoiding all Alcohol & Drugs.

As long as this life lasts, I am thus protected by these 5 precepts...

It is also a prayer offered on this day for the revival of Bhikkuni Sasana in Sri Lanka with the hope that it will flourish in the future. It is proposed that the day should also be celebrated as the International Women’s Day, as a mark of honour to Sangamitta who established the women's Order.
