= Devi (wife of Ashoka) =

Indian queen

- Maharani
- Born: 302 BC; Ujjayini, Avantirastra, Maurya Empire (Present day Ujjain district, Madhya Pradesh, India)
- Died: 242 BCE (aged c. 59 – 60)
- Spouse: Ashoka (m. 286 BCE)
- Issue: Mahendra; Sanghamitra
Names
- Vedisa-Mahadevi Sakyakumari
- Dynasty: Maurya
- Father: Devasetthi, (Vidisha Merchant)
- Religion: Buddhism

Devi (302 BCE – 242 BCE) according to the Sri Lankan chronicles, was the first wife of the third Mauryan Emperor Ashoka. She was also the mother of Ashoka's children - his son, Mahendra and his daughter, Sanghamitra - both of whom played important roles in the spread of Buddhism to other countries. She is also remembered for the Sanchi Stupa.

== Origin ==
According to the Ceylonese chronicles, Ashoka's first wife was the daughter of a merchant of Vedisagiri (present-day Vidisha), Devi by name, who Ashoka had married well he was Viceroy at Ujjain. The Mahabodhivamsa (a Ceylonese source) calls her Vedisa-Mahadevi and a Sakyani or a Sakyakumari as being the daughter of a clan of the Shakyas who had immigrated to Vedisa nagaram out of fear of Vidudabha menacing their mother country. This would make her a relative of the Buddha's family or clan, as he also belonged to a clan of the Shakyas.

== Marriage ==
Devi and Ashoka shared a close and loving relationship unlike the usual dynastic arrangements. She gave Ashoka his first two children, the boy Mahendra, born in about the year 285 BCE, and the girl Sanghamitra, born about three years later. Yet, Devi failed to convert Ashoka to Buddhism and he left her and their children in Vidisha when he was finally recalled to Pataliputra. Thus, Devi did not follow Ashoka as sovereign to Pataliputra, for there his Chief Empress (agramahisi) was his wife, Asandhimitra. It would have been unfitting for a prince of the House of Maurya to have a merchant's daughter for a spouse, and a more suitable wife was found for Ashoka in Princess Asandhimitra who was his chief empress for the majority of his reign.

Devi is described as having caused the construction of the Great Vihara of Vedisagiri, probably the first of the monuments of Sanchi and Bhilsa. This explains why Ashoka selected Sanchi and its beautiful neighbourhood for his architectural activities. Vedisa also figures as an important Buddhist site in earlier literature.

== In popular culture ==
Devi plays an important role in modern artistic adaptions concerning Ashoka, playing the role of his love interest and wife in them.

- Asoka, a Hindi movie where she is played by Hrishita Bhatt.
- Chakravartin Ashoka Samrat, a TV serial where she is portrayed by Kajol Srivastav.
- Prachi Bohra portrays Maharani Devi in Ekta Kapoor's historical drama series Pracchand Ashok on Colors TV.
