= Ancient Mihintale Monastic Complex =

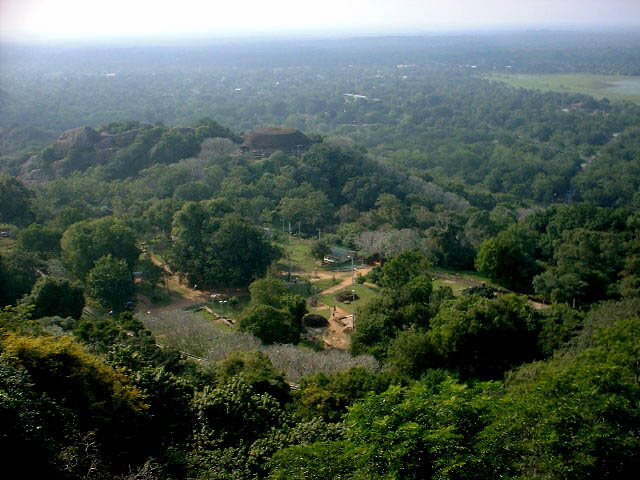
- View of the ruins found in Mihintale
- Interactive map of Ancient Mihintale Monastic Complex
- 8.3555°N 80.5119°E
- Location: Mihintale, Anuradhapura, Sri Lanka

History
- Built: 3rd Century BC
- Abandoned: By 11th century the monastic complex was abandoned due to the fall of Anuradhapura kingdom

Site notes
- Elevation: 1014 feet
- Area: 450 acres
- Architectural style: Anuradhapura style
- Excavation dates: 1890
- Archaeologists: H.C.P Bell, Senarath Paranavithana
- Condition: The complex is in ruins, but has also been conserved
- Owner: Department of Archaeology (Sri Lanka)

The Ancient Mihintale Monastic Complex (Sinhala: පැරණි මිහින්තලේ ආරාම සංකීර්ණය) also known as the Cradle of Sinhala Buddhist civilization, historically known as Missaka Pabbata (Sinhala: මිස්සක පබ්බත), Mihintale monastic complex is the first Buddhist center of Sri Lanka and the first Theravada Buddhist center in the world, built by king Devanampiya Tissa in 3rd century BC as a royal garden but was later expanded into a Buddhist monastery complex.

== Etymology ==
Mihintale is a hill range consisting of four different hills -

- Mihintale kanda (Hill of plateau of Mahinda)
- Vehera kanda (Hill of elephants stupa)
- Rajagiri Lena kanda (Hill of the kings rock cave)
- Anayikkote kanda (Hill of fort of an elephant)

Mihintale monastic complex was called also as Ambastale, Chetiya Pabbata, Sesgiriya, Chetigiriya, Mihindutalava and Segiriya.

== Background ==
In the 6th century BC, Gautama Buddha, accompanied by Arhats, visited and meditated in Mihintale; for this reason, Mihintale is considered sacred to Buddhists and it is considered as Solosmasthana.

Mahinda Thera and his followers landed in Mihintale during king Devanampiya Tissa's reign in 3rd century BC on a Poson poya day, before Mahinda Thera arrived, the king had come to his royal garden for the water sport festival called Karthika ulela and to hunt, while the king was hunting for deer, Mahinda Thera called the king by his personal name Tissa, the king looked towards Mahinda Thera's direction, Mahinda Thera introduced himself and mentioned that he came to Sri Lanka due to the request from the king to introduce Buddhism to Sri Lanka.

== History ==
Mihintale is widely considered as the site where Sinhala Buddhist civilization began.

Multiple monasteries and other structures such as ponds were constructed by king Devanampiya Tissa and his brother Uttiya, from king Devanampiya Tissa's time period to king Kirti Sri Rajasinha’s time, constructions and expansions were done in Mihintale monastic complex.

Arahat Mahinda preached a sutta (sutra) called Mahappamada, indicating that a Buddhist monastery to be built, the king prepared 68 caves for the personal use for the monks in Missaka Pabbata, the king also wanted to build a stupa to enshrine Gautama Buddha’s sacred relics, Emperor Ashoka sent the alms bowl relic, right tooth relic and the collar bone relic of the Buddha, stupas was built for the relics in Mihintale and Anuradhapura.

A sampling from the Sri Maha Bodhi was planted at Chetiyagiri in Mihintale, after Mahinda Thera passed away some of his relics were enshrined at Mihindu seya, Arahat Sanghamitta established a nunnery in Mihintale.

A famous Chinese monk named Fa Hsien from 5th century, mentioned that 2000 monks had resided in Mihintale monastic complex, with the discovery of large monastic ruins, Mihintale at its peak was a large monastery with forests surrounding it and structures such as hospitals, tanks, caves, uposathagharas and more buildings supporting its function as a monastery.

Established initially as a Theravada Buddhist monastery, considered second only to the Mahavihara of Anuradhapura, by the 5th century it was converted into a Mahayana Buddhist center, functioning under Abhayagiri monastery, until 10th century Mihintale was a Mahayana Buddhist center and then becomes a Theravada Buddhist monastery from 10th century until it was abandoned.

=== Works conducted in the site ===
Name of the construction or rehabilitation	Date	By whom	Description
Royal garden	250-210 BC	King Devanampiya Tissa	Built it as a place to hold water sport festival and to hunt deer.
Sinha Pokuna (Lion pond)	250-210 BC	King Devanampiya Tissa	The name was given due to the figure of a standing lion with water ejecting from its mouth
Kantaka stupa	250-210 BC	King Devanampiya Tissa	Lord Buddha's collar bone is believed to be enshrined in this stupa
Ata Seta Len (Sixty eight caves)	250-210 BC	King Devanampiya Tissa	Built for arahat Mahinda and his followers
Mihindu Guhawa (Cave of arahat Mahinda)	250-210 BC	King Devanampiya Tissa	The cave which arahat Mahinda lived in
Mihindu Seya (Stupa of arahat Mahinda)	210-200 BC	King Uttiya	Stupa built to enshrine arahat Mahinda's relics
Maha Seya (Great stupa)	7-19 AD	King Mahanaga	Largest stupa discovered in Mihintale
Sela stupa	7-19 AD	King Mahanaga	Site where king Devanampiya tissa and arahat Mahinda met.
Giribhanda stupa	7-19 AD	King Mahanaga	Believed to be constructed by the king
Chapter house	119-109 AD	King Lanjatissa	Constructed these two structures
Unknown stupa	119-109 AD	King Lanjatissa	Constructed these two structures
Vatadage	167-186 AD	King Kanittha Tissa	Built the Vatadage
Vatadage	249-262 AD	King Gothabhaya	Restored the building
Kalamattika Weva	263-273 AD	King Jettha Tissa I	Presented to the monastic complex
Naga Pokuna (Cobra pond)	571-604 AD	King Aggabodhi I	Named because the king has consumed rice at a place called Naga Chathuska
Mahinda Vapi	571-604 AD	King Aggabodhi I	Tank constructed with the name of arahat Mahinda
Unknown Buddhist buildings	718-724 AD	King Aggabodhi V	Restored Buddhist buildings.
Ganasela	815-831 AD	Queen of king Dappula II	A cave temple given to the Mihintale monastic complex
Katu Maha Seya (Stupa of instruments)	815-831 AD	Queen of king Dappula II	Built a stupa which is said to contain the equipments that was used to build religious buildings in Mihintale.
Unknown nunnery	815-831 AD	Queen of king Dappula II	A nunnery was built for nuns
Giribhanda stupa	815-831 AD	Queen of king Dappula II	Restored the stupa
Ancient Mihintale hospital complex	853-887 AD	King Sena II	Constructed one of the oldest hospitals in the world.
Kaludiya Pokuna (Black water pond)	898-914 AD	Ilanga Sena (Chief commander of king Kassapa IV)	Built a monastic complex
Unknown Buddhist buildings	11th-12th century	King Vijayabahu I, Parakramabahu I and Nissankamalla	Restored Buddhist buildings in Mihintale.
Mihintale monastic complex	17th century	King Kirti Sri Rajasinha	Restored the monastery

==== Decline ====
With the fall of Anuradhapura kingdom, Mihintale monastic complex was abandoned but was restored by Polonnaruwa monarchs and was abandoned again but during transitional period of Sri Lanka, king Kirti Sri Rajasinha restored the monastery for it to be abandoned again after the Kandyan period.

==== Rediscovery, excavation and conservation ====
A government official of the North Central Province discovered the ruins of the ancient Mihintale monastic complex in 1886, he excavated the foundation of the Sannipata shala(Convocation hall) and started the restoration of Maha Seya stupa, H.C.P Bell had inspected the ancient complex ruins in the same year, he quotes:

“A great deal of archaeological work has to be done at this place, so closely connected with the sacred history of Anuradhapura. These hills are honey combed with countless caves, dwellings of hermit priest”

— H.C.P Bell, Archaeological Survey of Ceylon- North Central Province- Annual Report 1890, Page 9

The British Ceylon government had forcefully occupied majority of the land of ancient Mihintale complex, this pushed the monks of the Mihintale monastery to take over the ancient ruins, temporarily preventing archaeological excavations at the site, later the two parties was able to come to an agreement and the excavations started again, exploration, excavation and conservation efforts were taken place continuously until 1970s also minor activities were done until 1972 at the site.

== Structure ==
=== Ancient Mihintale hospital complex ===
A hospital complex constructed by king Sena II for the medical use of monks and citizens near the monastic complex, noted as one of the oldest hospital ruins in the world, the hospital complex constitutes multiple structures such as Tampita vihara, patient rooms, storage room for medicine and more, multiple medical equipment is discovered at the site such as clay jars for storage, multiple scissors, unknown equipment made from copper which contains hooks on it, believed to be used to make incisions, mortar and pestle used to grind medical herbs into powder, a medicinal trough was also discovered at the site for the immersion of the patient in medicinal fluids such as oils.

Floor plan of the Mihintale hospital complex with distinctive rooms

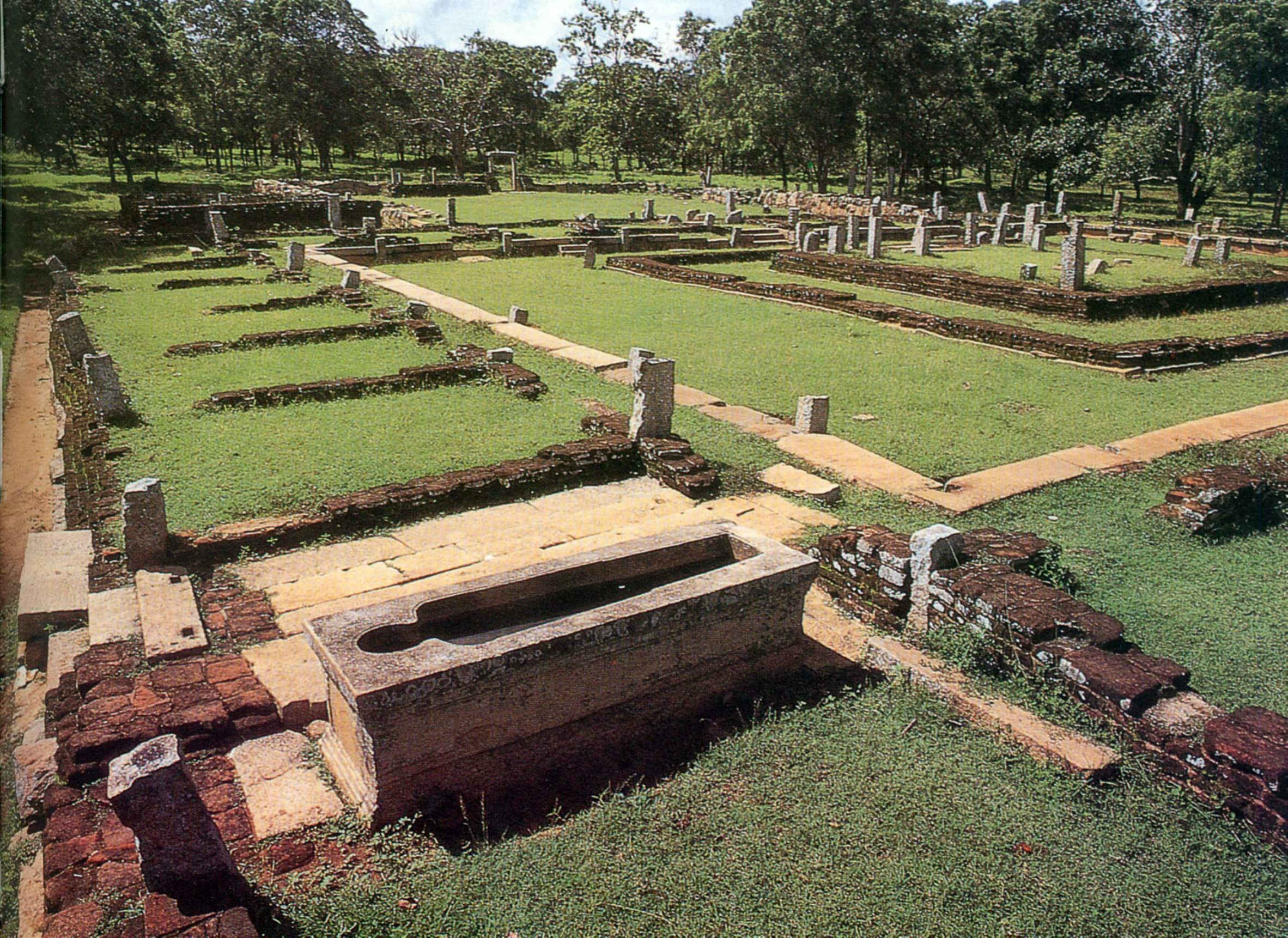
A traditional Beheth Oruwa(Medicinal trough)

=== Maninaga Mandiraya (Maninaga Edifice) ===
It is a building belonging to the group of Panchakavasa (Monastic building with five structures), found next to the left foot of the staircase to Mihintale, the floor plan of this structure is a square shaped with four buildings in the four sides and a Pilimage (image house) at the center, the four buildings are private residences for the monks at Mihintale.

Each building has an area of 125 square feet and made up of twelve pillars holding the structure, it is believed that each of the four buildings had one or two floors, the private residence found at the eastern direction is believed to be a special structure.

Floor plan of the complex

=== Piyageta Pela (Stairway of Mihintale) ===
A ancient stairway found in Mihintale monastic complex, considered as the most unique stairway in Sri Lanka, the stairway is made from stone and directly carved into it by ancient Sinhalese architects, it is divided into three sections, one of them is found in Meda Maluva (Middle courtyard), there is a total of 1840 steps found in the complex, it has a length of 14.33m and a width of 4.27m, also two structures similar to chambers have been found at either sides, which have a dimension of 3.66 x 2.90 meters.

The three sections of the stairway in Mihintale are-

- Uda Maluva (Upper courtyard)
- Meda Maluva (Middle courtyard)
- Kantaka Chetiya Maluva (Kantaka Chetiya courtyard)

The reason that made the stairway special is the construction of a stone wall at either sides to strengthen the stairway and each step in the stairway is close to each other, conservation efforts of the stairs have taken place in 1937, 1940 and 1952.

Ancient stairway leading up to Uda Maluva

=== Giribhanda complex ===
This complex contained a medium-sized stupa called Giribhanda stupa and other structures such as a Dhatu Garbha (Relic chamber), when the site was discovered it was in ruins, believed to be constructed by king Mahanaga, at its peak Giribhanda and Kantaka stupa were large monuments for ancient visitors to behold, this stupa had a diameter of 88 feet and the key feature of this complex is the Dhatu Garbha (Relic chamber), the place where Gautama Buddhas relics and other valuables were enshrined.

Some of the earliest Anuradhapura style murals can be found at this complex such as magnificent deities, which made up the walls in the complex, 28 of these deities are recognizable today.
