= Rajagala =

Mountain in Sri Lanka

- Rajagalathenna, Rassagala
- Location within Sri Lanka

Highest point
- Elevation: 1,038 ft (316 m)
- Coordinates: 7°28′40.7″N 81°37′58.4″E

Naming
- Native name: රජගල

Geography
- Location: Ampara District, Eastern Province, Sri Lanka

Rajagala (The Monarch's Rock)(Sinhala: රජගල), commonly Rassaagala or Rajagalathenna, is a rugged and heavily forested mountain situated 1,038 feet (316 m) above sea level, in a sparsely populated part of Eastern Province, Sri Lanka which has an important archaeological value. The Rajagala archaeological site is only second to the Mihintale monastery in Anuradhapura and it spreads over 1,600 acres (650 ha; 2.5 sq mi). It consists more than 600 prehistoric ruins, monuments and artifacts, and nearly 100 of them are ancient stupas.

== Location ==
Access to the mountain from Ampara Town is about 24 kilometres (15 mi) north of Ampara - Maha Oya Road (A27), via Uhana and the village of Bakkiella.

== Rajagala Archaeological Training Centre ==
Earlier this site was not subject to any archaeological research. After four years of recent excavation, Department of Archaeology developed Rajagala archaeological site as the new Archaeological Training Center with the participation of India's Deccan University.

== History ==
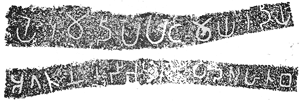
Stone inscription that states about Arahath Mahinda Thero Transcription:Ye ima dipa paṭamaya idiya agatana Iḍika-[tera-Ma] hida-teraha tube Translation:This is the stupa of the elder Ittiya and the elder Mahinda, who came to this Island by its foremost good fortune. Script:Brahmi/Sinhala Language:Prakrit

The history of the place is not definite, but Bhikkhus are believed to have inhabited it before the 1st century BCE. Stone inscriptions of the period have been found at the site. All over the northern summit of the mountain, extensive ruins have been excavated from the jungle, and some are only partially excavated. However, Its history goes back to the early days of Buddhism and an inscription tells that the Arahath Mahinda Thero, who brought the Buddhism to Sri Lanka, had visited the Rajagalathenna Temple. There are only two rock inscriptions referring to the Arahath Mahinda Thero; one of the inscriptions found in this site and the other is in Mihintale. It is believed that ashes of the Arahath Mahinda Thero and his disciple "Itthiya Thera" (latter name being given as Idika) were enshrined in a stupa here. A stone inscription found nearby bears evidence to this fact, although no excavation or restoration work has been carried out at this site to confirm what's inscribed in the stone inscription.

=== Name "Rassagala" ===
Archaeologist stated, the people of the Raksha tribe had lived in the area. They were human beings who worshiped the Rakshasas. The Sanskrit word raksha means devils and demons, in Sinhala ‘Rassayo’ or ‘Rakshayo’, the word raksha have become Rassa over the years and since then this mountain is called Rassa-gala (The devils/demons' mountain).

=== Rajagalathenna Temple ===
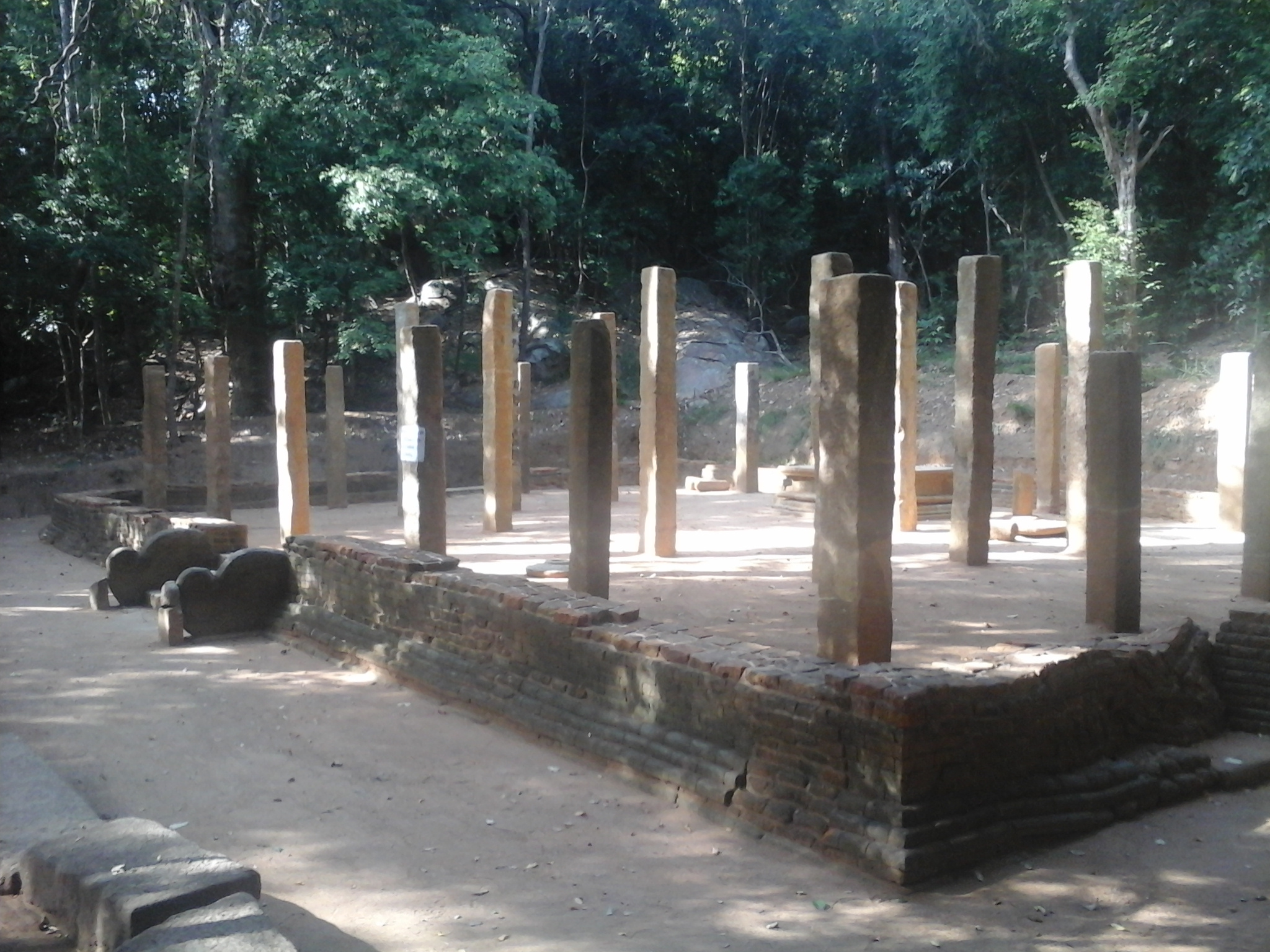
Ruins at Rajagala Temple

Rajagalathenna or Rajagala Temple known in ancient times as the Girikumbhila Temple and it is situated half-way up the mountain. Once it was a great monastery patronized by the kings and princes of Ruhuna and Rajarata. In Prince Saddhatissa’s time that Rajagala really began to grow. During his father's governorship of Digamadulla, his son Prince Lanja Tissa and his family embellished Rajagala on a lavish scale. Prince Lanja Tissa continued his patronage even after he ascended the throne of Anuradhapura, transforming this remote hermitage into one of the greatest monasteries in the Kingdom of Ruhuna and the name Rassagala became Rajagala (The King's Rock).

== Mountain path ==
Rock cut steps and stairway goes straight up the hill and it was once a paved roadway. There are buildings occupying every level of the hill. The centrepiece of the monastery is a large rocky plateau. A roadway leads down across the rock, passing Chaityas, viharas, dwellings and dining halls.

== Caves ==
Above the temple further up the mountain, are the caves of the hermits. Unlike the caves of Mihintale, these remain almost as they were. Many of the walls and doorways are still in place. Some are made of brick or wattle and daub, others are adorned in stone. Inside, the walls are covered with plaster, once they would have been full of paintings. Although they were enclosed, each cave was built to catch the wind and cooled by internal draughts.

There are also caves that had been used by monks. They were separated by walls into rooms such as the living room, bedroom, kitchen and toilet. Some of them still exist. Near most of the caves is a stone inscription, stating the donor or the resident of the cave. The stone inscriptions found probably here belong to the Anuradhapura era. All of them describe incidents from that era. They are written in Brahmi script (Prakrit), which are believed to be the first stage in the evolution of Sinhala script.

== Artifacts ==
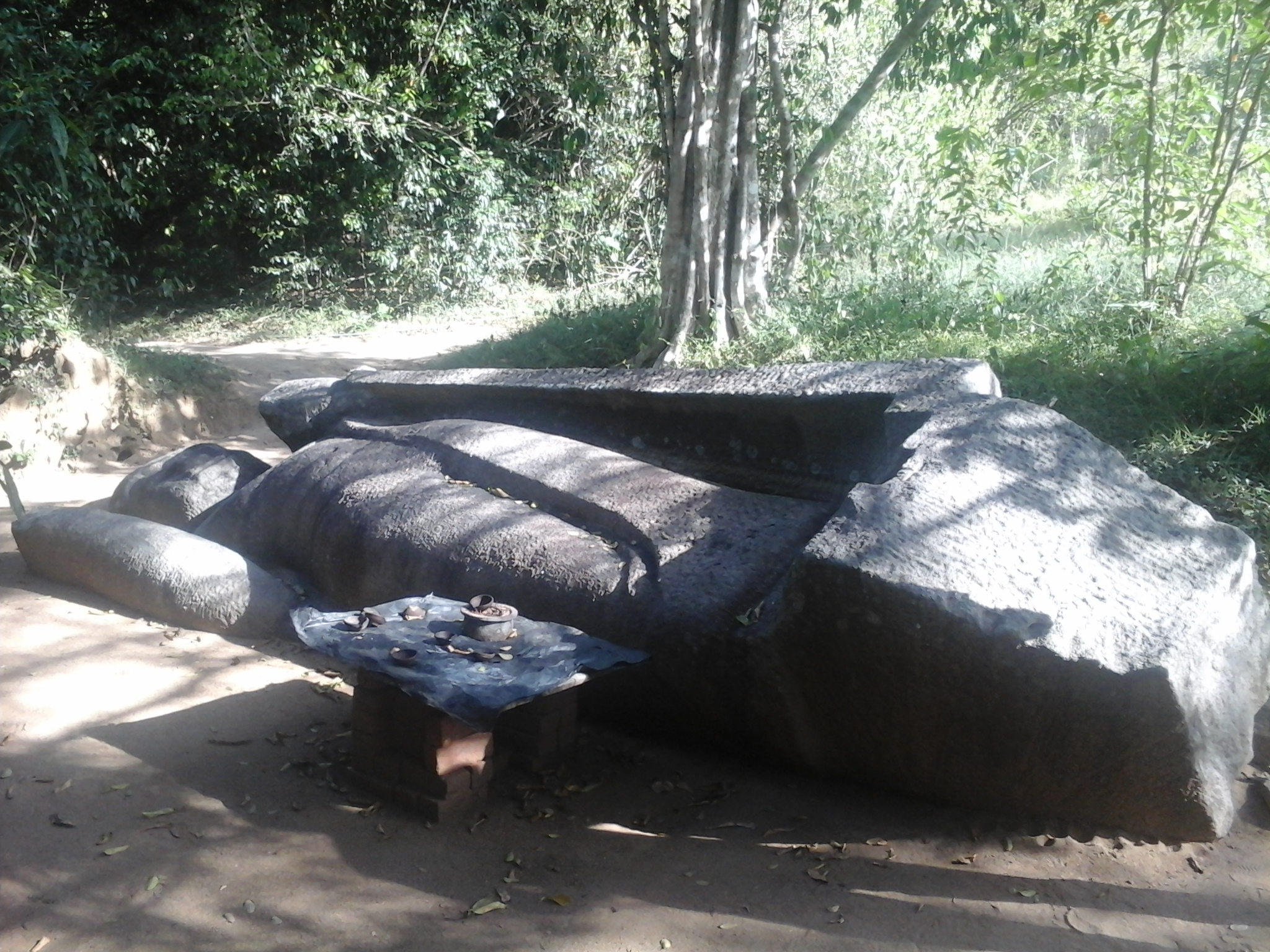
Half-carved Buddha image in Rajagala

According to archaeological sources, the temple belongs to the most prosperous era in Sri Lankan history. Many dagobas, temples, ponds, shrine rooms and sandakadapahana (moonstone) have been discovered from the site. Amongst the ruins are two most important antiquities. The first of these is a large and beautifully made stone bowl. Such bowls were used for offering the first fruits of the harvest to the Buddha. Further in the jungle there is a large block of stone about 16 feet (5 m) long with a half-carved Buddha image. All the lines on the statue are straight and at right angles to each other and there are no details. Archaeologists believe that apprentice sculptors had carved the images leaving them to be perfected by master sculptors. However, the statue remains unfinished.

- There are some drawings on the stones and rocks, done with ash or chalk, which are believed to have been done by the adivasies (indigenous people). Archaeologists believe that the drawings probably belong to the prehistoric era although it's not a definite fact.
- At most of the entrances at the site, there is a korawakgala (a stone artifact located at the beginning of the handrail - stone balustrades), a muragala (guardstone) and a Sandakada pahana (moonstone) at the entrance of the site. The moonstone differs from those found at other places in Sri Lanka. A lotus motif spreads all over the moonstone, whereas in other moonstones, the carvings include tuskers, horses, swans and flames. Despite the cultural and archaeological value of the site, visitors have desecrated many artifacts by writing and drawing on them. Due to this most inscriptions have been obliterated.
- Even the guardstone found at the site is different from those found at other places. Here, the figure of a man holding a pot in one hand and keeping the other hand on his hip can be seen. Some other guardstones depict another small figure next to the main figure. Archaeologists believe it has to be the wife of the guard. There is another guardstone where the guard holds the pot in both hands. This is another feature which is different from other guardstones in the country.
