= Mahinda (Buddhist monk) =

Indian Buddhist monk and son of the Mauryan emperor Ashoka

Arahat Mahinda
- මිහිඳු මහ රහතන් වහන්සේ
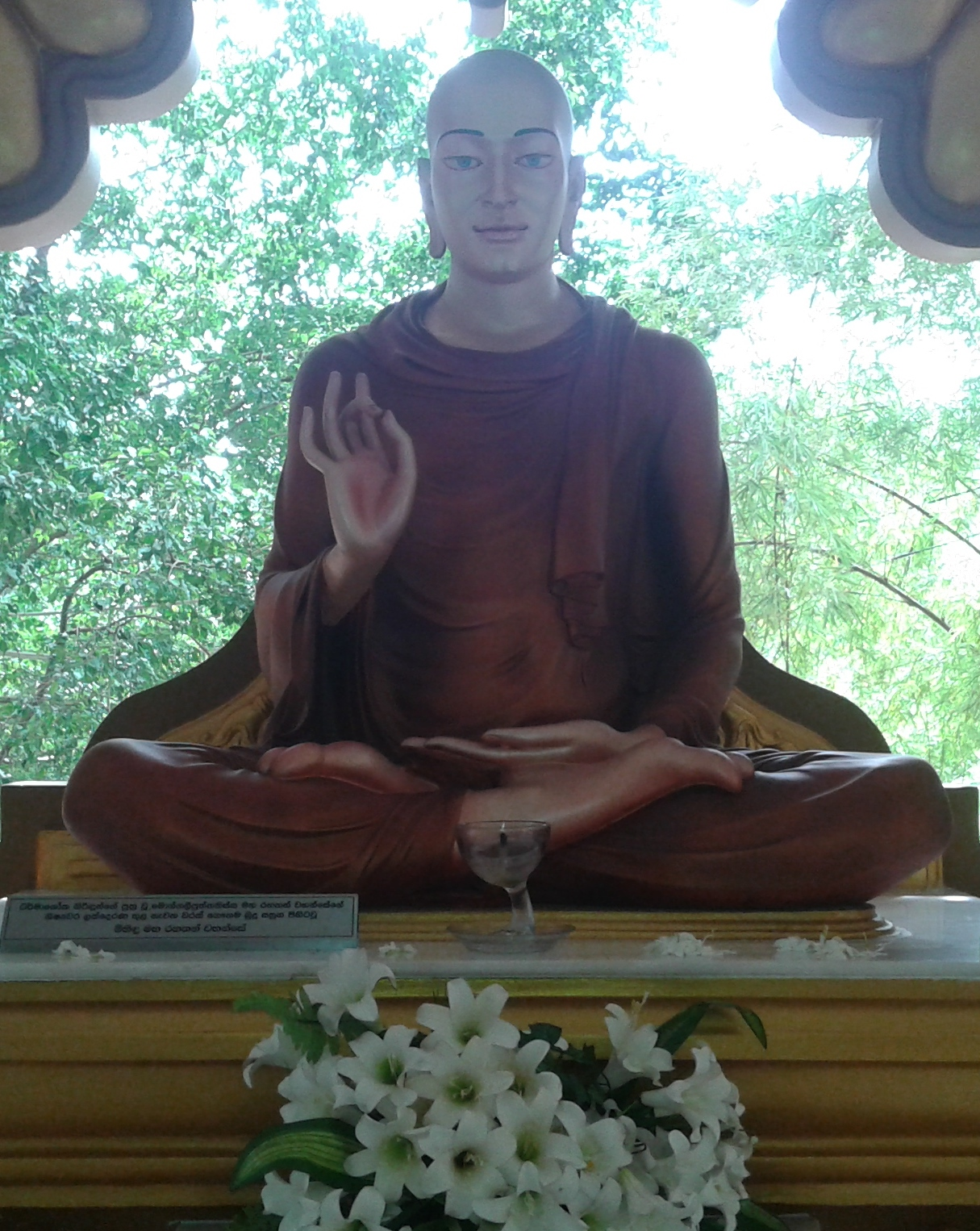
- An Arhat Mahinda Statue at Mahamevnawa Buddhist Monastery, Sri Lanka

Personal life
- Born: Prince Mahinda Maurya (Pali); 285 BC Ujjeni, Avantirastra, Mauryan Empire (Present day Ujjain district, India)
- Died: 204 BC (aged c. 79 – 80) Anuradhapura Kingdom, (Present day Sri Lanka)
- Cause of death: Senescence
- Resting place: Sri Lanka
- Parent(s): Ashoka (father); Devi (mother)
- Education: Buddhist religion
- Known for: Establishing Theravāda Buddhism in Sri Lanka

Religious life
- Religion: Buddhism
- Sect: Theravada

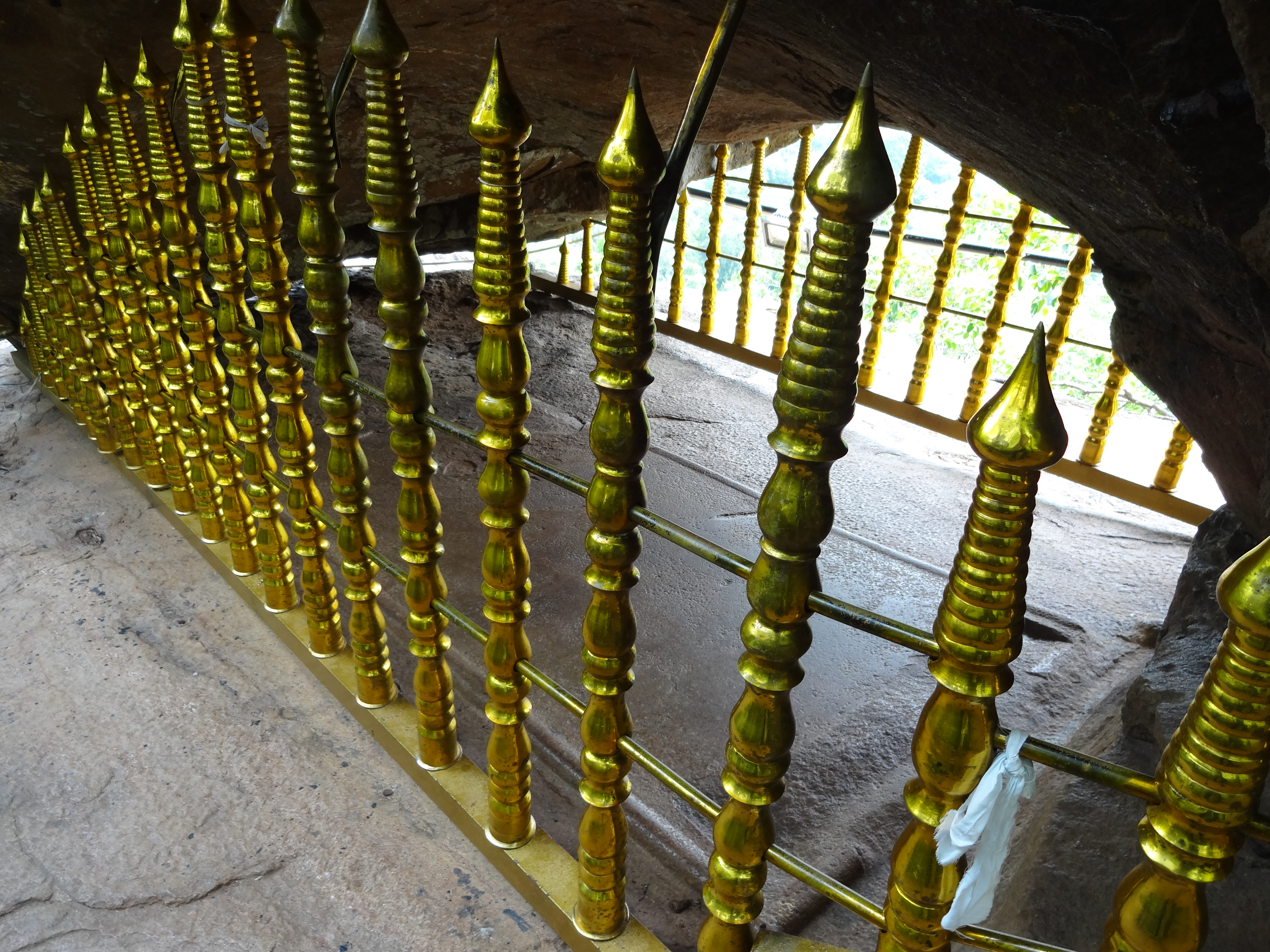
Bed of Mahinda in Mihintale

Mahinda (Sinhala: මිහිඳු මහරහතන් වහන්සේ/mihin̆du maharahatan vahanse) (285 BCE – 204 BCE) was an Indian Buddhist monk depicted in Buddhist sources as bringing Buddhism to Sri Lanka. According to Sri Lankan tradition, he was a Mauryan prince and the first-born son of Emperor Ashoka from his first wife Queen Devi, and the older brother of Princess Sanghamitra.

Mahinda was sent as a Buddhist missionary to the Anuradhapura Kingdom in Sri Lanka. Mahinda attained arhatship and resided at Mihintale. He played an important role in proliferating Buddhism throughout the Indian subcontinent.

== Historical sources ==
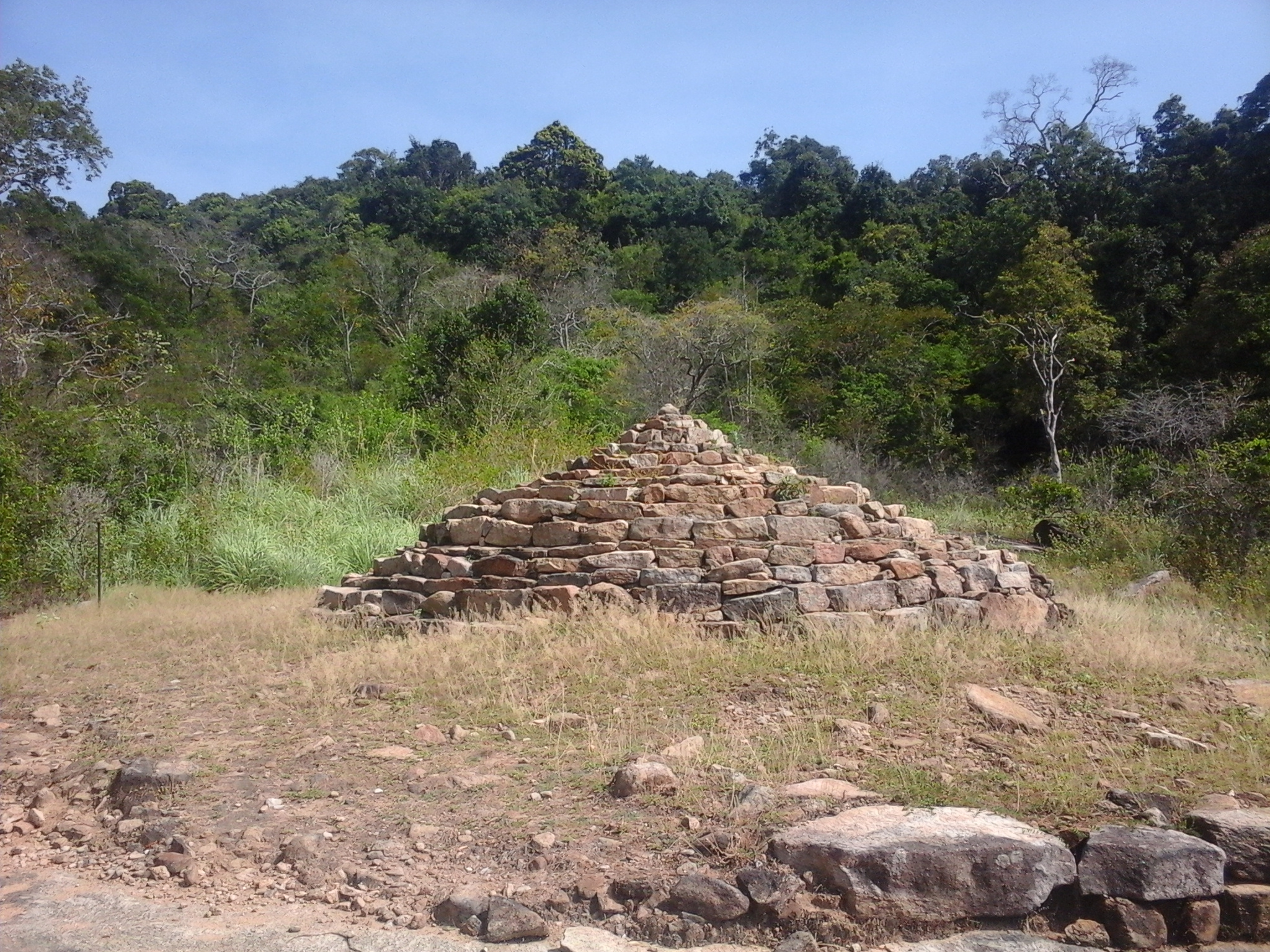
Mihindu (Mahinda in Pali) Seya at Rajagala, the place where the inscription commemorating Arahat Mahinda was found

The Dipavamsa and the Mahavamsa, Sri Lanka's two great religious chronicles, contain accounts of Mahinda travelling to Sri Lanka and converting King Devanampiya Tissa. These are the primary sources for accounts of his life and deeds. Inscriptions and literary references also establish that Buddhism became prevalent in Sri Lanka around the 3rd century BCE, the period when Mahinda lived. The inscription in Rajagala monastery confirm the fact that Thera Mahinda came to Sri Lanka to propagate Buddhism and lived there until his death.

Period: Circa 200 BC, Script: Early Brahmi, Language: Elu
Transcript: Ye ima dipa paṭamaya idiya agatana Iḍika-[tera-Ma] hida-teraha tube
Translation: "This is the stupa of the elder Ittiya and the elder Mahinda, who came to this Island by its foremost good fortune."

The Mahavamsa says that Mahinda, the son of Ashoka, came to Sri Lanka and that Ashoka's daughter became a nun and brought the Bodhi Tree.

Though Ashoka wanted his prodigal eldest son Mahendra to succeed him and made several attempts to bring him out of renunciation, due to the orthodox Hindu community's refusal to accept a Buddhist Crown Prince from a Vaishya mother as well as Mahendra's own lack of enthusiasm to take over an empire, he gave up. Though texts describe Mahendra's motive in leaving for Sri Lanka as spiritual, historians have argued that it was more of a political motive. Ashoka had feared that Mahendra would be killed just like Sushima, so to keep him safe and to avoid any succession war, he sent him to Sri Lanka. The party left from Vedasagiri monastery, believed to be modern-day Sanchi.

Mahavamsa and Dipavamsa, the chronicles of Sri Lanka, record the arrival of the party on the full moon of Jettha, a national festival. At the time, King Devanampiya Tissa was participating in a hunting expedition in the Mihintale hills. It is said that Ashoka and Devanampiyatissa were previously acquainted and on good terms, having exchanged gifts upon their respective ascensions to the throne. Upon meeting the shaven-headed monks Devanampiyatissa was taken aback by their appearance and asked who they were. After exchanging greetings, Mahinda preached the Chulahatthipadopama Sutra, and the royal hunting party converted to Buddhism. The party was subsequently invited to Anuradhapura, the seat of the throne for a royal reception and to give further dharma talks. Mahinda subsequently gave two public talks sanctioned by Devanampiya Tissa, in the Royal Hall and in the Nandana Garden in the Royal Park, leading to the start of the public embrace of Buddhism in Sri Lanka. The royal park Mahamegha was then set aside as the residence for Mahinda's party, and in later times became the Mahavihara, the earliest centre of Buddhist culture and scholarship Sri Lanka. The Chetiyagirivihara monastery was then established in Mihintale.

Mahinda then sent for his sister Sanghamitta from Magadha, who was a nun, to start a female Buddhist order after local women had expressed a desire to join the Sangha. Mahinda also arranged for a bodhi sapling from the original tree in Bodh Gaya to be sent to Sri Lanka, where it was planted in the grounds of the Mahavihara and is still visible today.

After a month spent delivering discourses to Sri Lankans who had ventured to the capital, Mahinda retreated to Mihintale to spend the vassa during the monsoon season. As a result, a second royal-funded monastery was built there. Later, Mahinda organised for a stupa to be constructed, and a part of the bodily relics of Gautama Buddha were transferred from the Maurya Empire to Sri Lanka. Mahinda then had Arittha, Devanampiyatissa's nephew, a bhikkhu, expound the Vinaya monastic code of discipline to further Buddhism in Sri Lanka.

Mahinda outlived Devanampiyatissa and died at the age of 80 in Sri Lanka. King Uttiya, who succeeded his brother, organized a state funeral for Mahinda and constructed a stupa to house his relics at Mihintale.

== Significance and legacy ==
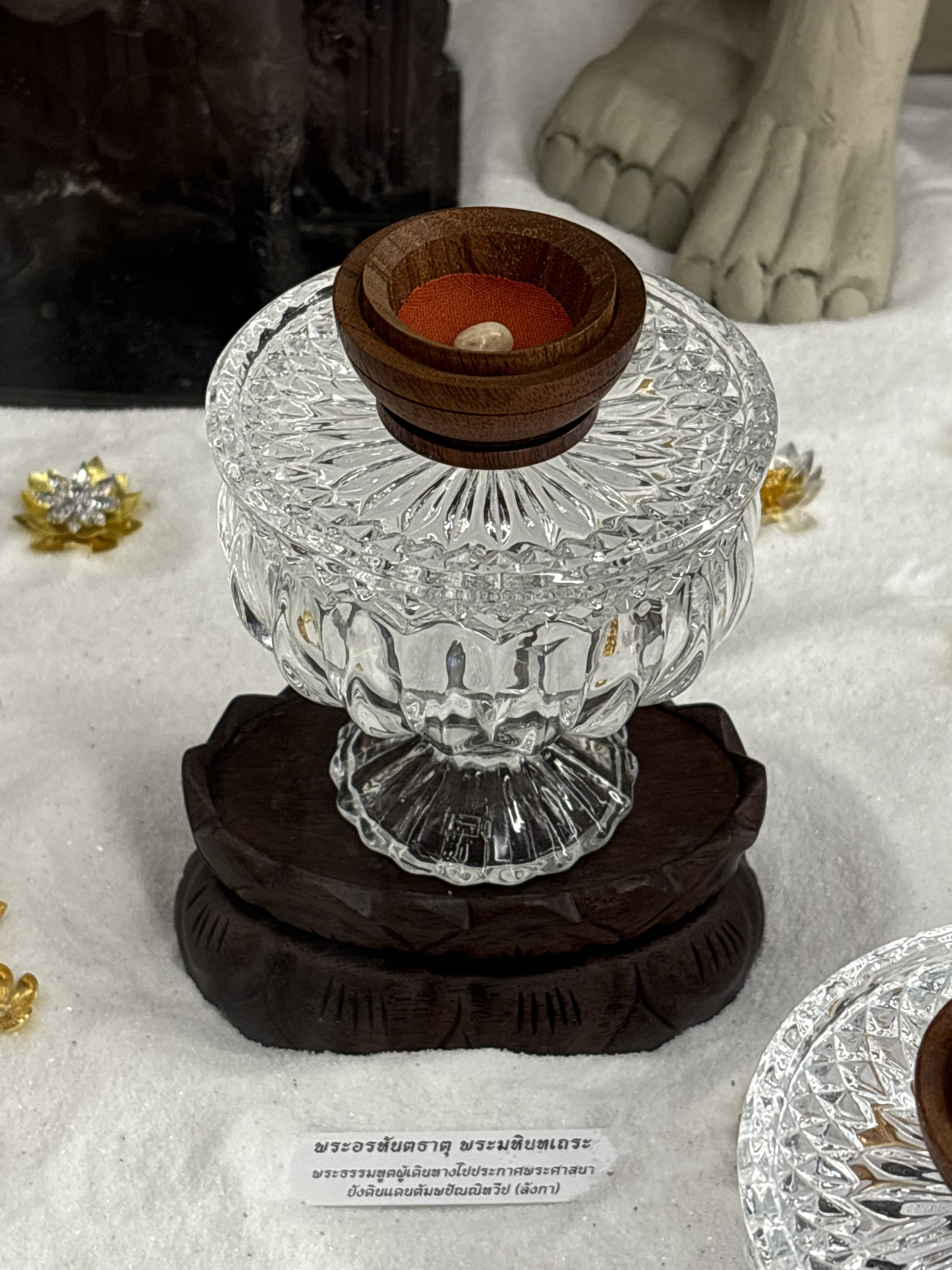
Relics of Mahinda Thera, collection of Wat Pathum Wanaram Temple, Bangkok

The 20th century Sri Lankan monk Walpola Rahula described Mahinda as "the father of Sinhalese literature" as he had translated and written commentary for the Tripitaka in Sinhala, turning it into a literary language. He was also credited with introducing the culture of the Mauryan Empire to the island, along with its architecture. More recently, Suwanda H. J. Sugunasiri, a Canadian scholar, has identified him as the Redactor of the oldest Buddhapuja in the world (247 BCE).

Mihintale, the mountain where Mahinda supposedly first encountered King Devanampiyatissa and the site of his funerary stupa, is an important pilgrimage site in Sri Lanka. Pilgrimages are traditionally undertaken in the month of June (Poson in the old Sinhala calendar), when Mahinda is believed to have arrived in Sri Lanka on the full-moon night of the month, a traditional time for religious observances in Theravada Buddhism.

== See also ==
- Sri Lankan Buddhism
- Ashoka
- Theravada
- Devanampiya Tissa of Anuradhapura
- History of Sri Lanka
