= Asoka (2001 film) =

2001 Indian film by Santosh Sivan

As̅oka
- Theatrical release poster
- Directed by: Santosh Sivan
- Screenplay by: Santosh Sivan; Saket Chaudhary
- Dialogues by: Abbas Tyrewala
- Produced by: Shah Rukh Khan; Juhi Chawla
- Starring: Shah Rukh Khan; Kareena Kapoor Khan; Danny Denzongpa; Ajith Kumar
- Narrated by: Suresh Oberoi
- Cinematography: Santosh Sivan
- Edited by: A. Sreekar Prasad
- Music by: Songs: Anu Malik; Score: Sandeep Chowta
- Production companies: Dreamz Unlimited; Arclightz Films
- Distributed by: Dreamz Unlimited
- Release date: 26 October 2001
- Running time: 176 minutes (Extended cut); 171 minutes (India); 145 minutes (Worldwide)
- Country: India
- Language: Hindi
- Budget: ₹12.5 crore
- Box office: est. ₹28 crore

As̅oka is a 2001 Indian Hindi-language epic historical drama film directed and co-written by Santosh Sivan. It is based on the early life of emperor Asoka, of the Maurya Empire, who ruled most of the Indian subcontinent in the 3rd century BC. The film stars Shah Rukh Khan as the titular character alongside Kareena Kapoor, Rahul Dev, Danny Denzongpa, Hrishitaa Bhatt, with Ajith Kumar in his Hindi debut who made a special appearance in the film. It was produced by Dreamz Unlimited and Arclightz Films. The screenplay was written by Santosh Sivan and Saket Chaudhary with dialogues written by Abbas Tyrewala. It was originally released as Ashoka: The Great in India.

Asoka was widely screened across the United Kingdom and North America, and was also selected for screening at the Venice Film Festival and the Toronto International Film Festival, where it received positive reviews. However, the film was a box-office failure upon release. It was dubbed into Tamil as Samrat Ashoka.

At the 47th Filmfare Awards, Asoka received 5 nominations, including Best Film, Best Director (Sivan) and Best Actress (Kapoor), and won Best Cinematography (Sivan).

== Plot ==
The film chronicles the early part of the life of Emperor Asoka. It begins with his career as a general in Takshashila and ends with the bloody conquest of the Kalinga.

Emperor Chandragupta Maurya, grandfather of Asoka, of the Maurya empire, has decided to embrace Jainism and abdicate the throne of the empire in favour of his son Bindusara. But his grandson, prince Asoka, claims his sword. The old emperor explains that this sword is evil, and the sword demands blood and destruction.

A few years later, Asoka, now a brave youth, is battling the rebellious chief of Takshashila for his emperor/father. He figures that his elder half-brother Susima Maurya, who also has an eye on the throne of the empire, has deliberately withheld reinforcements from arriving, but defeats the enemy nevertheless. Asoka returns to the capital victorious and confronts Susima. Later, Susima tries to assassinate Asoka while he is bathing. The fight among the princes makes the emperor unhappy, and he orders empress Dharma to control her son Asoka. She compels Asoka to temporarily leave the capital to lead the life of a common person. The prince is disappointed but leaves nonetheless.

Asoka, alone and disguised as an ordinary traveller, rides to the south. In his travels, he meets a lovely maiden, Kaurwaki and falls in love with her. He also develops a good relationship with her little brother Arya. They are on the run from the Kingdom of Kalinga along with their faithful protector Bheema and are being chased by soldiers of the kingdom. After saving their lives, Asoka introduces himself as Pawan, hiding his true identity. Kaurwaki and Arya are the princess and prince of Kalinga, who fled from their kingdom when the prime minister assassinated their parents and took over power. Later, Asoka and Kaurwaki get secretly married.

Soon, Asoka is summoned by his mother, who sent a messenger to tell him she has fallen ill and to come to the capital. The emperor dispatches Asoka to quell a rebellion in Ujjaini. Before marching to the west, Asoka travels to Kalinga to meet Kaurwaki and Arya. Unable to find them, and not knowing they have gone into hiding, he is informed by general Bheema that they were slaughtered. A heartbroken Asoka attempts suicide but is saved by Virat, who later swears to protect him. Mad with grief and anger, Asoka leads a brutal crackdown in Ujjaini. The assassins sent by Susima injure Asoka in a battle, and Virat again saves him. He is taken to a Buddhist monastery at Vidisa to recover.

There, he meets a Buddhist maiden, Devi, who cares for him. Asoka also survives another assassination attempt at Vidisa, this time with the help of Devi. Asoka marries Devi and returns in splendour to Pataliputra. Susima and his brothers are wild with anger from their futile attempts to eliminate Asoka. Emperor Bindusara, who favoured Susima over Asoka, becomes ill and dies. In another vigilante attack, empress Dharma is stabbed to death by assassins sent by Susima. Angered, Asoka wants to kill Susima but has second thoughts, and Susima is killed by Virat when he tries to kill Asoka behind his back and is appointed emperor.

A few months later, princess Kaurwaki and prince Arya return to Kalinga with Bheema and have the prime minister executed for treason. Asoka declares war on Kalinga after the latter grants asylum to Asoka’s last surviving brother Sugitra. Asoka is unaware that Kaurwaki is alive. Kaurwaki still does not know that Asoka is Pawan, and both sides prepare for war. General Bheema and Sugitra try to assassinate Asoka, but Bheema flees after realizing that Asoka is Pawan. Asoka kills Sugitra, while Bheema is mortally wounded by a spear but manages to return to Kalinga, where he mutters Pawan’s name to Kaurwaki before dying.

A terrible war is fought in Kalinga. The Mauryan Army inflicts a crushing defeat on Kalinga. Not content with the mere victory, Mauryan soldiers butcher everyone in sight, during which Kaurwaki is wounded. Asoka later visits the battlefield, where he discovers his horse, who was supposed to be in Kaurwaki's possession. With a surge of hope, he frantically searches for Kaurwaki and finds her. They have a heart-to-heart talk, and he apologises deeply for his actions. He is interrupted by Arya, who is dying after being pierced with arrows. With Arya dying in his arms, Asoka suddenly realises that his enemies, his family, and even Arya, are all dead because of him. His grandfather's warning about the sword had been correct.

The film ends with Asoka throwing the sword into the water at the same spot as his grandfather, and embracing Buddhism. The final narrative describes how Asoka not only built a large empire but spread Buddhism and the winds of peace throughout the empire.

== Cast ==
As per the film's opening credits:

- Shah Rukh Khan as Ashoka
- Kareena Kapoor as Karuvaki
- Danny Denzongpa as Virat
- Hrishitaa Bhatt as Devi
- Rahul Dev as Bheema
- Ajith Kumar as Susima
- Gerson Da Cunha as Bindusara
- Subhashini Ali as Dharma
- Umesh Mehra as Chandragupta Maurya
- Sooraj Balaji as Arya
- Johnny Lever as Magadha soldier
- Raghuvir Yadav as Magadha soldier
- Suresh Menon as Magadha soldier
- Shilpa Mehta as the Empress, Susima's mother
- Raj Laxmi Roy as a Bar girl
- Vivek Sharma as Sugidha
- C. L. Gurnani as Pandit
- Mithilesh Chaturvedi as Kalinga Minister
- Gayatri Jayaraman as Gypsy dancer in the song "Raat ka Nasha"
- Dimple Inamdar in an item number
- Bomie E. Dotiwala as Devi's father
- Shraddha Nigam
- Sham Kaushal as Governor of Takshashila
- Nawazuddin Siddiqui as a dacoit

== Production ==
"I was dancing in a train for a song in a movie ("Chaiyya Chaiyya" on the sets of Mani Ratnam's Dil Se..) that Santosh Sivan was lensing, and he came up to me between shots and told me about Asoka," says Shah Rukh Khan. "I could only understand half of what he said but I could see the determination in his eyes, and that, somehow or other, he would make it with or without me. That's 80% of the battle won. I was hooked."

The director, along with the principal costume designer Anu Vardhan, started working on the project two years before they started the actual shooting of the film. Though Vardhan agrees that there was no concept of wearing vests during that era, certain cinematic liberties had been taken because Shahrukh did not wanted to shoot shirtless throughout the film. "After all, it is a mainstream commercial film. During Shah Rukh's forest sequences, he wears square pieces of a blanket-like-material, folded into two and cut in between, to pass around the neck. Another piece of cloth was tried around his waist, acting as a belt. There was no stitching involved." Anu explains, "While researching for the film, we discovered that body art was a prominent part of that time. For the character of Kaurwaki (Kareena), we used different designs of tattoos." The armours and shields are worn by the artistes also form an important part of the costume for the final war sequences. Metal jackets composed of special fibre glass were made for around 4000 members of the cast. "These metal jackets are extremely light and comfortable and were made in Madras by more than 50 workers," she explains.

"I also tried to give the different parts of the film different looks: for example when the viewer is taken to Magadha (Bihar), the temples and houses have been made using black granite while when we are in Kalinga (Orissa) I have used brown sandstone and earth tones to generate a different feel. Also I worked with only six pillars in the film, it is hard to imagine that once you see the film", said Sabu Cyril.

The film was shot at various locations, such as Pachmarhi (the bulk of the romance between Asoka and the princess), Maheshwar (the palace intrigues of Pataliputra), Madhya Pradesh, Jaipur (battle scenes), Igatpuri and Bhubaneswar (the Kalinga portions). More than half the film was shot indoors on the studio floors of Film City and Filmistan. The elaborate final battle scene (the battle fought against the Kalingas) employed over six thousand extras and hundreds of elephants. Some of the actors portraying warriors in the film were masters of Kalari, who used their expertise. They were the only ones to use real weapons in the filming. The song "Raat Ka Nasha" was picturised at Bhedaghat and Panchmarhi in Jabalpur, Madhya Pradesh amidst the Narmada River.

The film is also known for using minimal special effects. While Lagaan was made at considerable expense, Asoka had only a moderate budget. Sivan says he didn't want any special effects, and no digitally augmented crowds. Priyanka Chopra turned down the offer to appear in a song in the film.

== Soundtrack ==
Asoka: The Original Motion Picture Soundtrack

Studio album by Anu Malik
- Released: 28 September 2001
- Genres: Filmi; World Music
- Length: 38:23
- Label: Sony Music
- Producer: Anu Malik

The film's soundtrack was composed by Anu Malik with the background score composed by Sandeep Chowta. Initially, A. R. Rahman was signed to compose the film's music, but for reasons unknown, opted out. Gulzar wrote the lyrics for five songs, while one song was written by Anand Bakshi ("San Sanana"). The soundtrack was very successful and according to the Indian trade website Box Office India, with around 1,500,000 units sold, the album was one of the year's the highest-selling.

=== Hindi tracklisting ===
Track Listing
No.	Title	Singer(s)	Length
1.	"San Sanana - Jaa Re Pawan"	Alka Yagnik, Hema Sardesai	5:54
2.	"Raat Ka Nasha"	K. S. Chithra and chorus	5:12
3.	"Roshini Se"	Alka Yagnik, Abhijeet Bhattacharya	6:40
4.	"O Re Kanchi"	Shaan, Suneeta Rao, Alka Yagnik	5:47
5.	"Raat Ka Nasha (Duet)"	K. S. Chithra, Abhijeet Bhattacharya and chorus	5:14
6.	"Aa Tyaar Hoja"	Sunidhi Chauhan, Chorus	6:09
7.	"Asoka Theme"	Instrumental	4:01

=== Tamil track listing ===
Track Listing
No.	Title	Singer(s)	Length
1.	"San Sanana"	K. S. Chithra, Hema Sardesai	5:54
2.	"Thaanguma Kanaakalin"	K. S. Chithra and chorus	5:12
3.	"Mogathile Kannirandum"	Zubeen Garg, Sadhana Sargam, Abhijeet Bhattacharya	6:40
4.	"Adiye Aathi"	Shaan, Kavita Krishnamurthy	5:47
5.	"Thaanguma Kanaakalin (Duet)"	K. S. Chithra, Abhijeet Bhattacharya and chorus	5:14
6.	"Kaathirukudhu"	Sunidhi Chauhan, Chorus	6:09
7.	"Asoka Theme"	Instrumental	4:01

== Reception ==
=== Box office ===
==== India ====
It opened on 26 October 2001, across 235 screens, and earned ₹1 crore (US$100,000) nett on its opening day. It grossed ₹2.87 crore (US$300,000) nett in its opening weekend, and had a first week of ₹5.26 crore (US$550,000) nett. The film earned a total of ₹11.54 crore (US$1.2 million) nett. It was the 13th-highest-grossing film of 2001 in India.

==== International ====
It had an opening weekend of $800,000 (₹3.84 crore) and went on to gross $1.07 million (₹5.13 crore) in its first week. The film earned a total of $1.8 million (₹8.64 crore) at the end of its theatrical run. Overseas, it was the 4th-highest-grossing Indian film of 2001.

=== Critical reception ===
Asoka was critically acclaimed upon release. On the review aggregator website Rotten Tomatoes, 100% of 10 critics' reviews are positive, with an average rating of 7.6/10. Peter Bradshaw of The Guardian called the film "a big, brash and deeply enjoyable Bollywood epic". He stated, "This movie's narrative gusto, its intricate, indirect eroticism – no sex, or even kissing – its lavish musical numbers and its sheer self-belief are a treat."

Neil Smith described the film; "with elements of both Gandhi (1982) and Braveheart (1995), Asoka is a big, sprawling epic that looks every rupee it took to bring it to the screen." However, BBC's Santosh Sinha noted, "It is at this point in the film [when the prince go into hiding as per the request of the mother Queen] that Asoka is temporarily lost and Shahrukh Khan the actor takes over. He meets Princess Kaurwaki in the forest and then chases her around in a typically Bollywood way. He [Khan] is also less convincing when, grieved by the loss of life in Kalinga, he renounces violence and vows to spread the message of peace far and wide. This comes across as melodramatic. Bollywood style, Asoka finds Kaurwaki and the young Prince Arya of Kalinga on the battlefield. Prince Arya manages a dying speech before he keels over and that breaks Asoka completely." Journalist, editor and film trade analyst Taran Adarsh wrote that "director Santosh Sivan has chosen a historical subject, but added his spice and come up with a fairytale kind of a flick. As a cinematographer, Santosh Sivan's work is flawless."

The portrayal of Asoka in the film proved controversial in India. "Shahrukh's Asoka is all bluster and mannerism, with no depth. Except for the nosebleeds and the mudbaths, he is the same Shahrukh of every other movie that he has acted in. The film leaves its many complex moments unexplored and disjointed, choosing to pitch it as a love story instead of an epic tale of war and peace," an Indian reviewer wrote.

Variety's David Rooney states, "a sprawling widescreen historical epic laced with Bollywood musical numbers, melodramatic romance, spectacular locations and violent battle scenes. Coming on the heels of Ashutosh Gowariker's Lagaan: Once Upon a Time in India, Asoka provides further evidence that Bollywood is poised for wider commercial impact beyond its already substantial established niche. And while the ambling, uneconomical nature of popular Indian storytelling makes major crossover business unlikely in this case, some degree of general art-house attention appears indicated. Khan cuts a dashing figure as a soulful hunk in the traditional Bollywood mould. At the same time, Kapoor plays ornately tattooed Kaurwaki as a lively mix of flirtatious coquette and feisty warrior woman, kind of like Jennifer Lopez meets Michelle Yeoh." Empire praised the movie gave it 4 out of 5 stars. It states,"Santosh Sivan may just be the man who provides that elusive Indian crossover hit with this rip-roaring historical adventure. The fact that Asoka was such a bloody warrior is no more ably demonstrated than when the battle scenes kick in near the end, it's like Akira Kurosawa goes Bollywood."

Critics generally praised the cinematography of Santosh Sivan.

== Historical accuracy ==
"Asoka had embraced Buddhism long after the Kaling War, and yet, as far as historical accuracy is concerned, there's a surprising result: though the whole Pawan/Kaurwaki episode is fantasy, the film mostly avoids messing around with the known facts", wrote historian Alex von Tunzelmann. There is also no historical evidence of a queen ruling Kalinga at the time of Asoka's invasion. The film also does not depict Asoka's love for Devi. The film also explicitly suggests that Kalinga was a democracy.

== Miniseries ==
StarPlus launched an extended miniseries version of the film, split into five episodes. It aired from 28 May 2002 to 25 June 2002.

== Awards and nominations ==
Award	Category	Recipients and nominees	Results
International Indian Film Academy Awards	Best Cinematography	Santosh Sivan	Won
Filmfare Awards	Best Cinematography	Santosh Sivan	Won
Filmfare Awards	Best Film	Santosh Sivan	Nominated
Filmfare Awards	Best Director	Santosh Sivan	Nominated
Filmfare Awards	Best Actress	Kareena Kapoor	Nominated
Filmfare Awards	Best Female Playback Singer	Alka Yagnik for "San Sanana"	Nominated
Screen Weekly Awards	Best Lyricist	Anand Bakshi for "San Sanana"	Nominated
Screen Weekly Awards	Best Female Playback Singer	Alka Yagnik for "San Sanana"	Nominated
Screen Weekly Awards	Most Promising Female Newcomer	Hrishitaa Bhatt	Nominated
Screen Weekly Awards	Best Background Score	Sandeep Chowta	Nominated
Screen Weekly Awards	Best Cinematography	Santosh Sivan	Nominated
Screen Weekly Awards	Best Action	Shyam Kaushal	Nominated
Zee Cine Awards	Best Film	Juhi Chawla, Shahrukh Khan	Nominated
Zee Cine Awards	Best Female Debut	Hrishitaa Bhatt	Nominated
Zee Cine Awards	Best Villain	Ajith Kumar	Nominated
Zee Cine Awards	Best Music Director	Anu Malik	Nominated
Zee Cine Awards	Best Lyricist	Gulzar for "Roshini Se"	Nominated
Zee Cine Awards	Best Male Playback Singer	Abhijeet Bhattacharya for "Roshini Se"	Nominated
Zee Cine Awards	Best Female Playback Singer	K.S. Chitra for "Raat Ka Nasha"	Nominated
Sansui Awards	Best Actor	Shahrukh Khan	Won

== See also ==
- Lists of historical films
- List of historical films set in Asia
