= San Sanana =

2001 single by Alka Yagnik

Single by Alka Yagnik and Hema Sardesai
- Language: Hindi
- Released: September 13, 2001
- Genre: Indi-pop
- Length: 5:55
- Songwriter: Anu Malik
- Producer: Ashish Manchanda

Music video
- "San Sanana" on YouTube

"San Sanana" is a 2001 Hindi song by Alka Yagnik featuring Hema Sardesai. It was composed by Anu Malik, and was among the songs of the Bollywood film, Asoka (2001).

In early 2024, the song came to international prominence through TikTok and other short-form video platforms via the "Asoka makeup trend". It eventually charted on the US TikTok Billboard Top 50 where it peaked at number 23 on the chart dated May 25, 2024.

== Personnel ==
All credits are adapted from Apple Music.

Musicians

- Alka Yagnik – Vocals
- Hema Sardesai - Vocals

Technical

- Anu Malik – Composer
- Anand Bakshi – Lyrics
- Ashish Manchanda – Mixing Engineer and Mastering Engineer

== Asoka makeup trend ==
The song gained international popularity in April 2024 via TikTok and other short-form video platforms such as Instagram Reels through the Asoka makeup trend also referred to as the Asoka makeup challenge. Makeup artists and internet personalities would lip sync to the lyrics while slowly transforming into an Indian bride, often interspersed with different styles of Indian makeup, looks and clothing, including dressing in the style of Kareena Kapoor's character in the 2001 film. It would culminate in a full reveal of the finished Indian bridal look. The trend was initiated by Indonesian TikTok creator, Sita Suwarnadwipa where it then spread across TikTok and then to other short-form video platforms.

== Charts ==
Chart performance for "San Sanana"
Chart (2024)	Peak position
US TikTok Billboard Top 50	23
