= Mihintale =

Mountain peak in Sri Lanka

Coordinates: 8°21′02.14″N 80°31′01.00″E

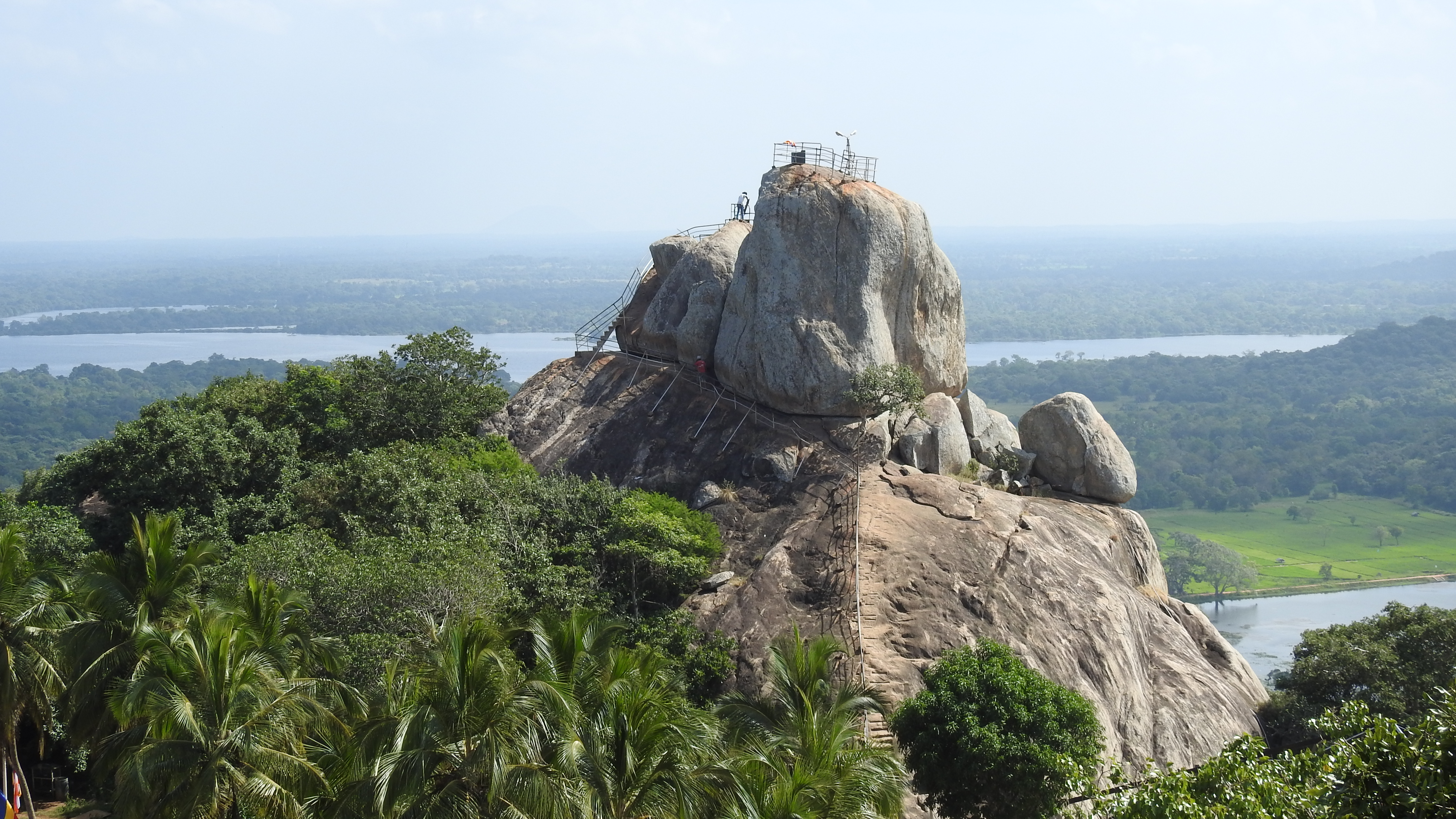
Missaka Pawwa in Mihintale, where the Arahath Mahinda landed. This is also known as Aradhana Gala.

Mihintale is a mountain peak near Anuradhapura in Sri Lanka. It is believed by Sri Lankans to be the site of a meeting between the Buddhist monk Mahinda and King Devanampiyatissa which inaugurated the presence of Buddhism in Sri Lanka. It is now a pilgrimage site, and the site of several religious monuments and abandoned structures.

== History ==
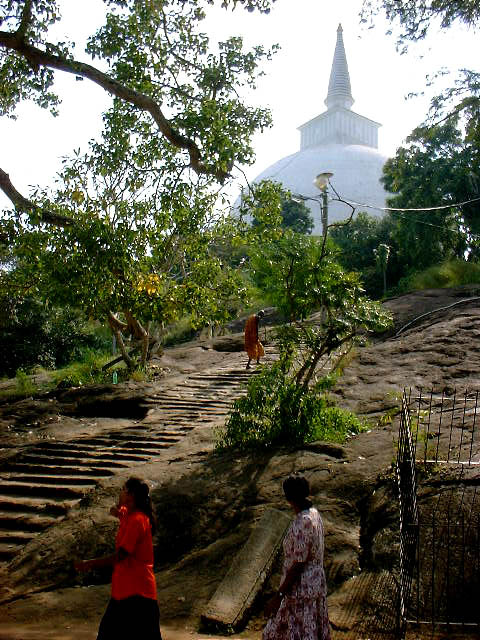
Steps carved in rock near stupa.

Approximately 12.5 km (7.8 mi) east of Anuradhapura, close to the Anuradhapura - Trincomalee Road is situated the "Missaka Pabbata" which is 1,000 feet (300 m) in height and is one of the peaks of a mountainous range.

According to Dipavamsa and Mahavamsa, Thera Mahinda came to Sri Lanka from India on the full moon day of the month of Poson (June) and met King Devanampiyatissa and preached the Buddhist doctrine. The traditional spot where this meeting took place is revered by the Buddhists of Sri Lanka. Therefore, in the month of Poson, Buddhists make their pilgrimage to Anuradhapura and Mihintale.

Mahinda was the son of Emperor Ashoka of India. King Ashoka embraced Buddhism after he was inspired by a monk named “Nigrodha.” The King was in great misery after witnessing the devastation caused by expansionist wars. Meeting this peaceful young monk was a turning point in his life, thereafter, he renounced war. He was determined to spread the message of peace. As a result, both his son and daughter were ordained as Buddhist monastics and became enlightened Arahats. In his quest to spread the message of peace instead of war, Ashoka sent his son Mahinda, to the island of Lanka, which was also known as “Sinhalé”. This island was ruled by his friend King Devanampiyatissa. Thus, “Mahinda” was the Indian name, which in Sinhalé, became “Mihindu.”

In Sinhala Mihin-Thalé literally means the “plateau of Mihindu”. This plateau is on top of a hill from where Arahat Mihindu was supposed to have called King Devanampiyatissa, by the King's name to stop him from shooting a deer. Hence, “Mihin Thalé” is a specifically Sinhala term.

From ancient times, large steps were constructed to climb Mihintale. It is stated that King Devanampiyatissa constructed a vihara and 68 caves for the bhikkhus to reside in. At Mihintale there gradually grew a number of Buddhist monasteries or viharas with all the dependent buildings characteristic of the monasteries of that period.

== Inscriptions ==
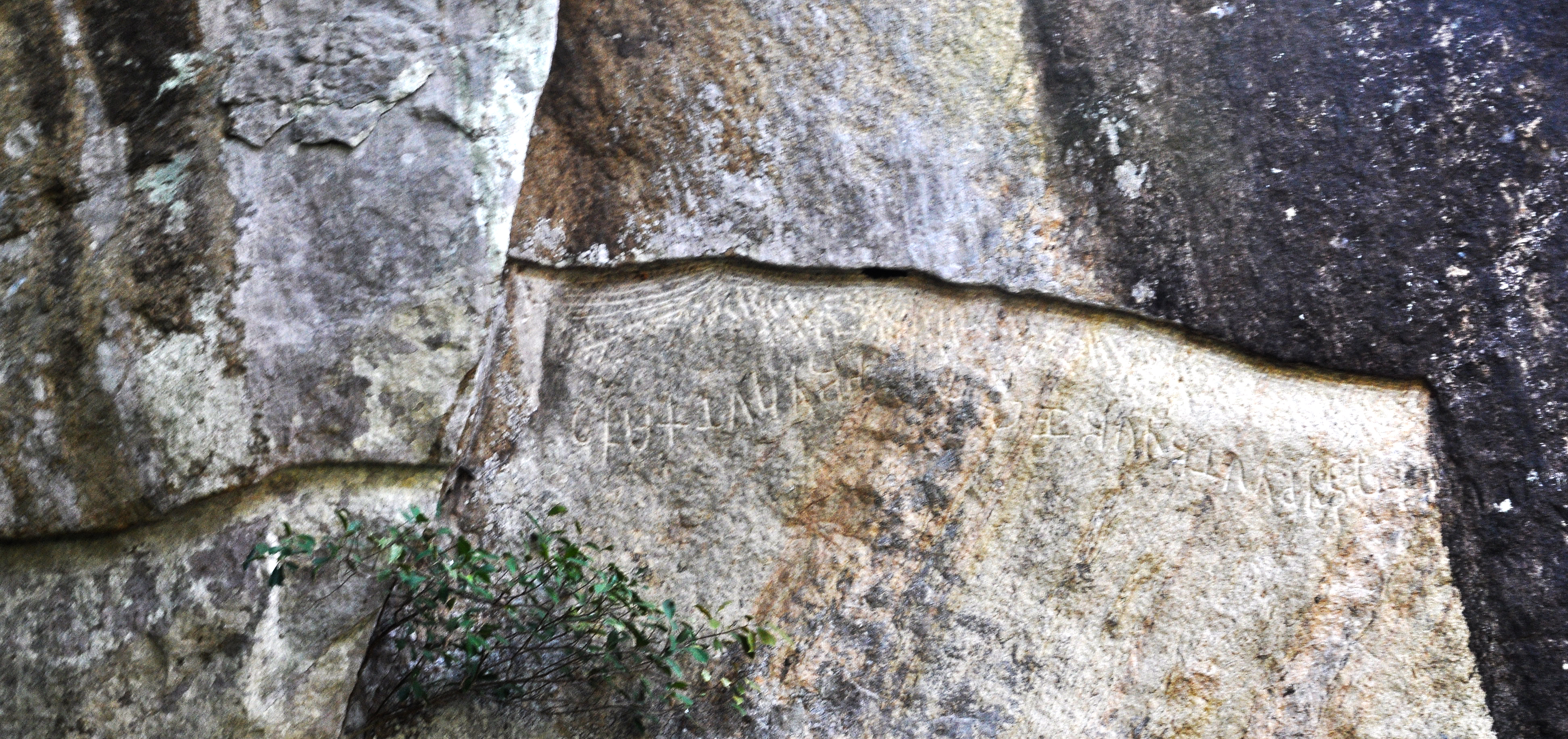
Inscriptions- Mihintale Sri Lanka

The Mihintale Inscriptions are a collection of inscriptions found in Mihinthale, Sri Lanka, that date back to the third century BCE to the 10th century CE. During this time, the kingdom of Anuradhapura was flourishing. After the 10th century, no inscriptions have been found in Mihinthale, possibly due to the migration of the kingdom from Anuradhapura to Polonnaruwa.

A total of 106 Brahmi inscriptions have been found in the Mihinthale area, ranging from the 3rd century BCE to the first century CE. These inscriptions can be found in caves such as the Mihintala Kanda Rajagiri Cave Kanda, Mihintala Anaikutty Kanda, and Atvehera Kanda.

The majority of these inscriptions are written in Brahmi characters, with the Mihintale tablet, written in the 10th century CE, being the longest and best-preserved of all the inscriptions. In addition to these, inscriptions have also been found at Kantaka Chetiya, Sela Chetiya, Atvehera Kanda, and inscriptions on copper plates were uncovered during the excavation of Idikatu Seya Dagoba.

== Significant locations ==
=== The Hospital ===
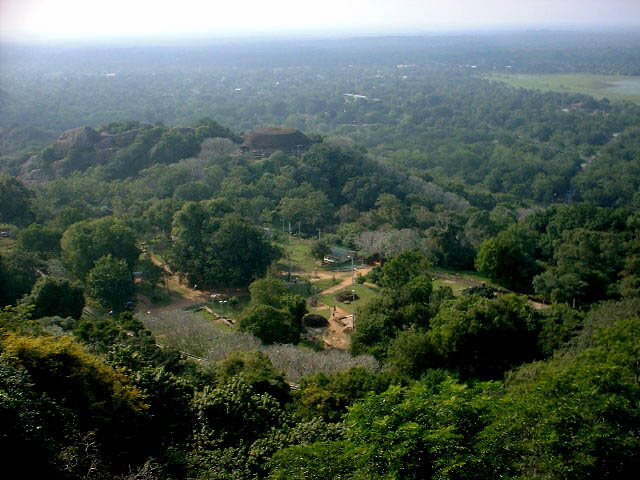
A view towards the entrance from top.

At the foot of the mountain are the ruins of a hospital, medical bath (or stone canoe in which patients were immersed in medicinal oil) a stone inscription and urns belonging to the ancient period have been unearthed. Between the hospital and the steps leading to the rock are the ruins of a large monastery. On the floors of the square building which is 125 feet (38 m) on one side, are beautiful carvings and also are stone balustrades and guard stones. As this side is precipitous, the steps are on the eastern side of the slope, spacious and in 4 sections. The stairway has 1840 steps made of granite, leading to the summit. At the end of the first set of steps on the right side of the plain, is a small mountain peak. On this is situated the most famous Kantaka Cetiya.

Heinz E Müller-Dietz (Historia Hospitalium 1975) describes the hospital as being perhaps the oldest in the world.

=== Kantaka Cetiya ===
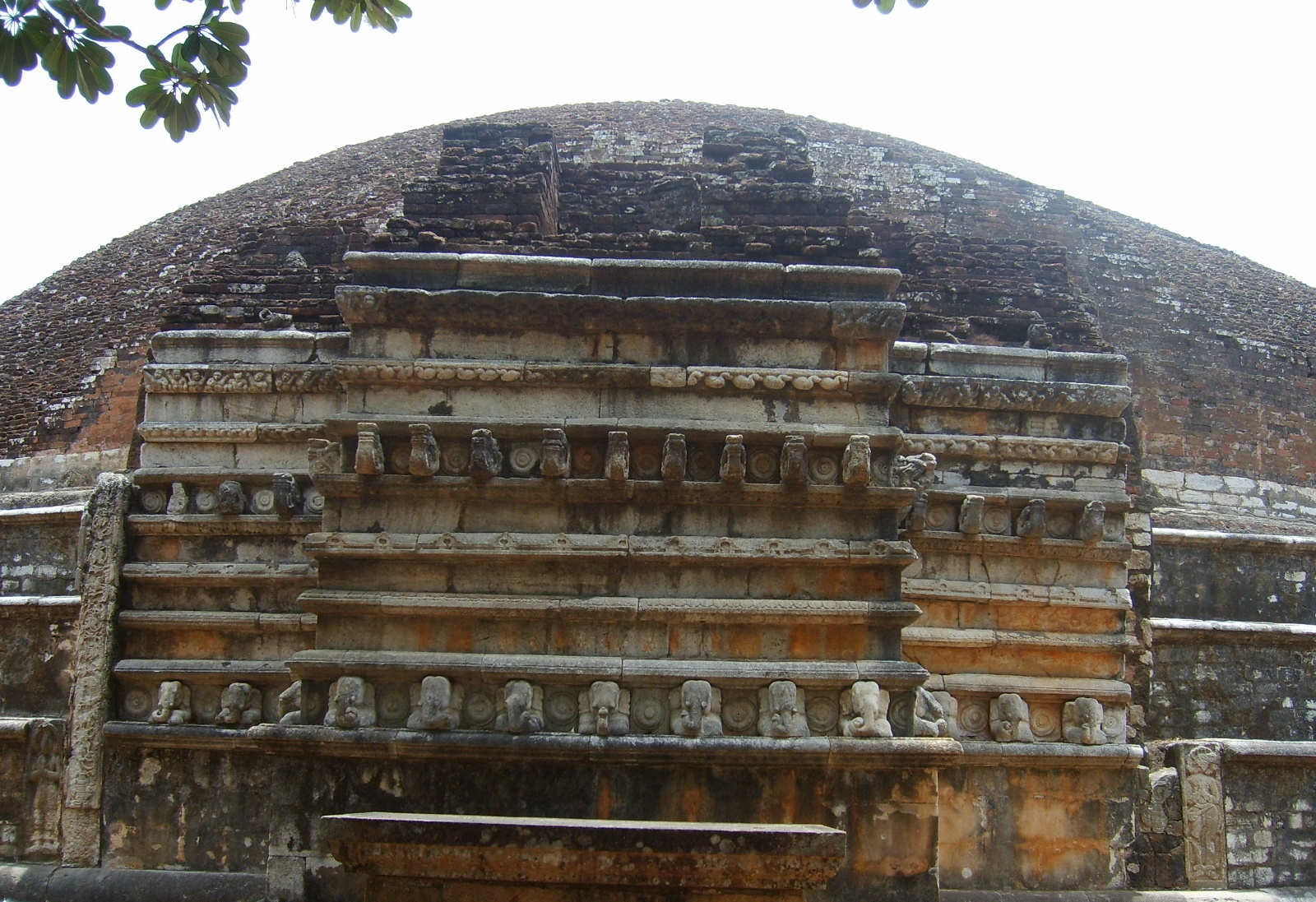
Kantaka Cetiya Vaahalkada.

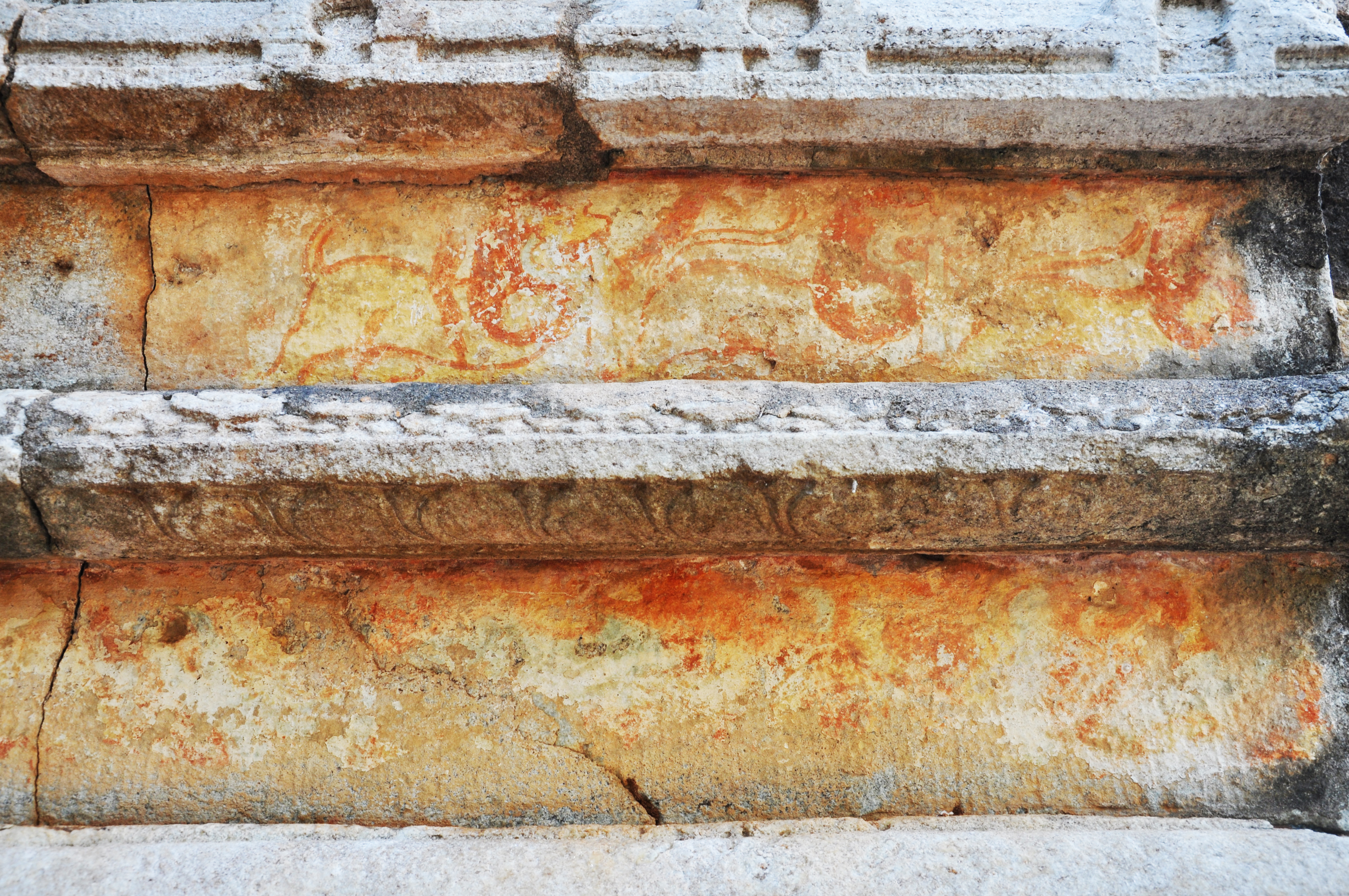
Frescos at Kantaka Cetiya Mihintale Sri Lanka

Kantaka Cetiya is a circular stupa having a base circumference of about 425 feet. It has three stepped rims. It has four frontispieces in the four cardinal directions. The frontispiece is called Vaahalkada. All the Vaahalkadas are decorated with sculptures of dwarfs, animals, humans, divine figures and floral motifs. One of the most important of the sculptures on the Kantaka Cethiya Vaahalkada is the elephant-headed God with two arms. The Saivites call it Ganapati or Ganeesaa.

The four vahaalkadas facing the four cardinal points have different animals on the top of the square pillars - the elephant on the east, the lion on the north, the horse on the west and the bull on the south.

Most Indian and Sri Lankan archaeologists believe that there is a symbolic relationship between these animals and the four cardinal directions. But, they differ in associating a particular animal with a particular direction.

However, in a moonstone of Sri Lanka and the Lion Capital of Saranath, we find these four animals sculptured in the moving position. At the same time, in the coins collected in the Northern mainland of Sri Lanka, the Jaffna peninsula and Akurugoda of Rununa, we find the following symbols marked on them: 1. the Lion on one side, and a group of four dots placed in the form of a square at the centre of a circle on the other side; 2. the Horse on one side and a group of four dots placed in the form of a square at the centre of a circle on the other side; 3. the Bull on one side and a group of four dots placed in the form of a square at the centre of a circle on the other side.

Also in Northern and southern Sri Lanka, coins having a bull on one side and an elephant on the other side have been discovered. In India coins with a bull on one side and a lion on the other side have been discovered.

Therefore, the animals lion, horse and bull are associated with the very same group of four things. Therefore, the animals lion, horse and bull must symbolize a human who is associated with a group of four things.

Thus, one could come to the conclusion that the four animals lion, horse, elephant and bull symbolize Lord Buddha who is associated with the Four Noble Truths. Further study on coins, sculptures etc. will confirm this conclusion.

The Sinhalese archaeologists and historians say that King Suratissa has built this Stupa. The Pesavalalu and the frontispiece have been preserved to a great extent. There are ruins of the stupa which are 40 ft (12 m) in height. The monks would have resided in the caves close to the stupa. As this stupa was renovated by King Lajjitissa. There is no doubt that this belongs to the 1st century B.C.

=== The Refectory ===
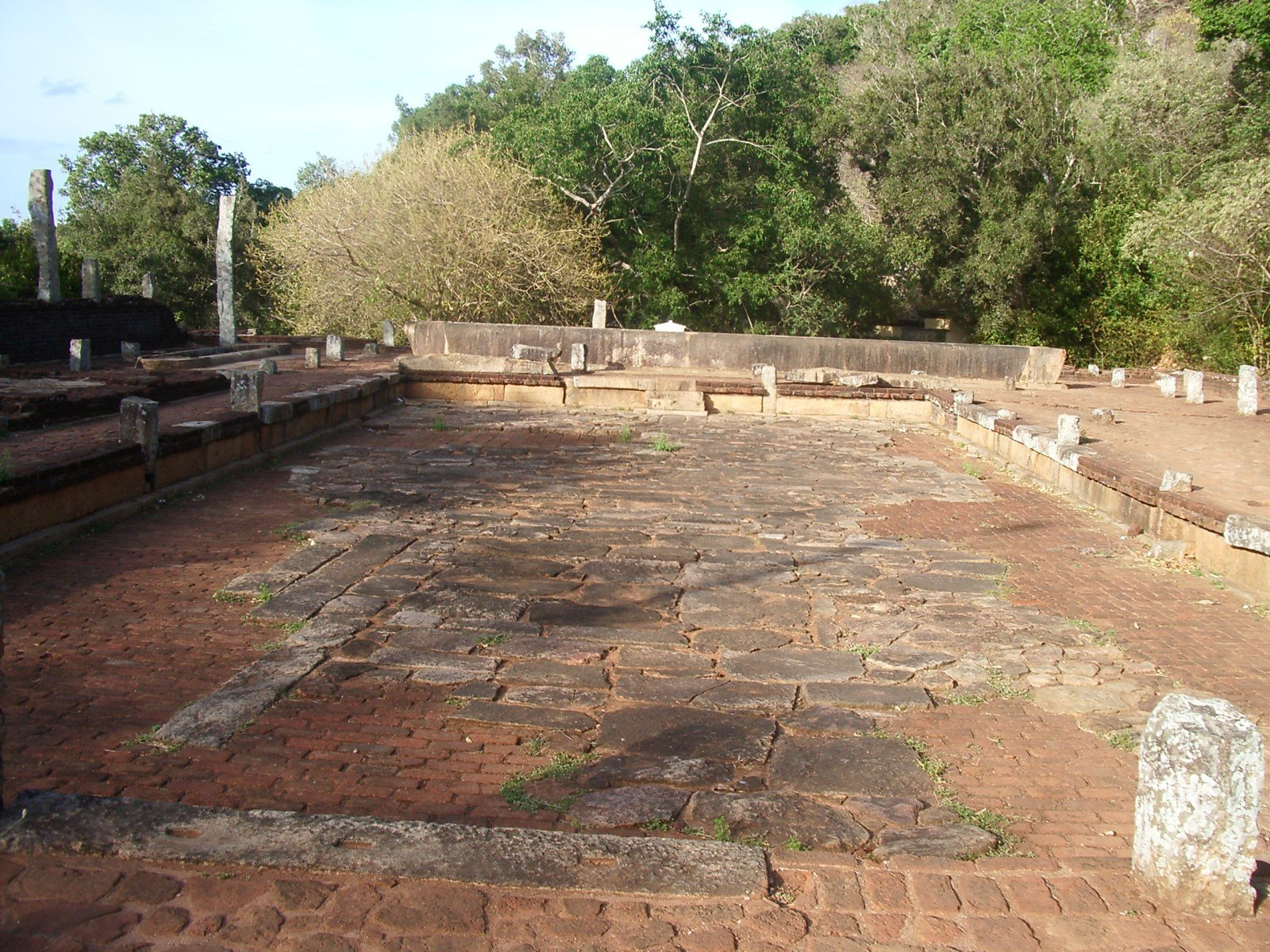
The Refectory.

The Courtyard is situated at the end of the third flight of steps. To the left of the courtyard is the refectory. The quadrangle is 62 feet (19 m) in length and 25 ft (7.6 m) in breadth and is surrounded by the storeroom. Since a part of a pipeline has been discovered here, it can be concluded that a systematic and well-planned pipe-borne scheme was provided. Two stone troughs can be seen here, which would have been used to store food close to the refectory.

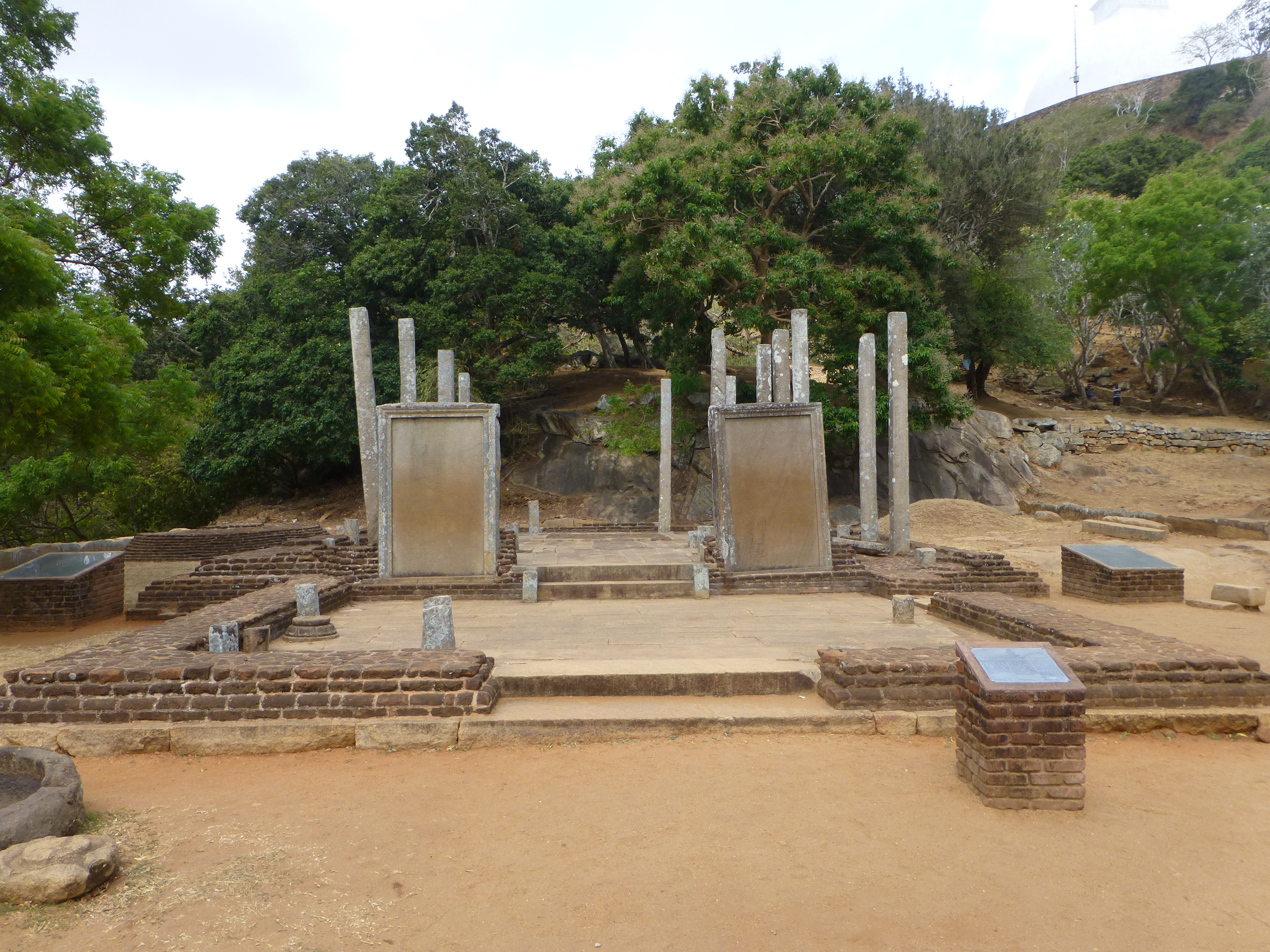
Mihintale Slab Inscriptions.

On either side of the entrance to a building, are 2 inscriptions engraved on 2 large slabs of granite known as the Mihintale stone inscriptions. The rules and regulations pertaining to the administrative purposes of the monastery are engraved on these 2 stone slabs. This inscription installed by King Mihindu (956 - 976 AD) contains records of payments made to the service staff. In the vicinity of another plain is the meeting hall of the monks. Here the monks met, to discuss the Dhamma and the Vinaya. This is an open building which is 62 feet (19 m) square and was constructed on 48 stone pillars. In the middle of the hall is a platform with 4 entrances.

To the East of the refectory is a stupa, 88 feet (27 m) in circumference. It has not been identified so far.

=== Ambasthala Dagoba ===
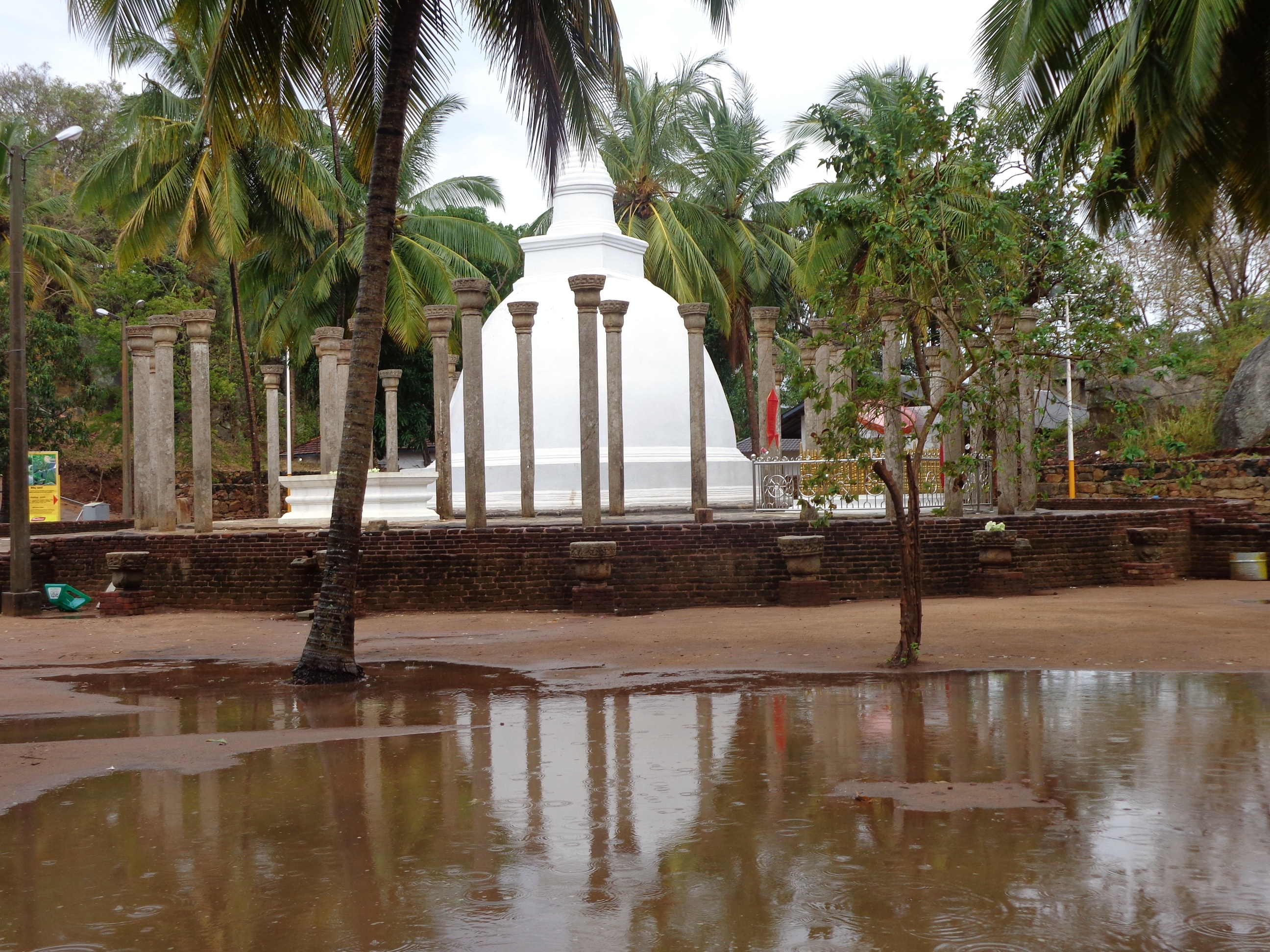
Ambasthala Dagaba, a small stupa surrounded with stone pillars.

Is situated on the plain close to the peak of the mountain, and is said to have been built by King Makalantissa. The ruins show that there has been a house built encircling the stupa. The Dagoba itself is said to enshrine the relics of the great Apostle Mahinda. It is here that King Devanampiyatissa first met Arahant Mahinda. The traditional spot where this meeting took place is marked by the Ambasthala Dagoba.

=== The Cave of Arahat Mahinda ===
When proceeding from Ambastala dagoba along the narrow road, on the slope is the cave known as Mihindu Guhawa or the cave of Arahant Mahinda, where he resided. Out of the caves, the most famous and incidentally the most sacred to Buddhists is this cave with its flattened slab on which Thera Mahinda was accustomed to rest.

=== Maha Stupa ===
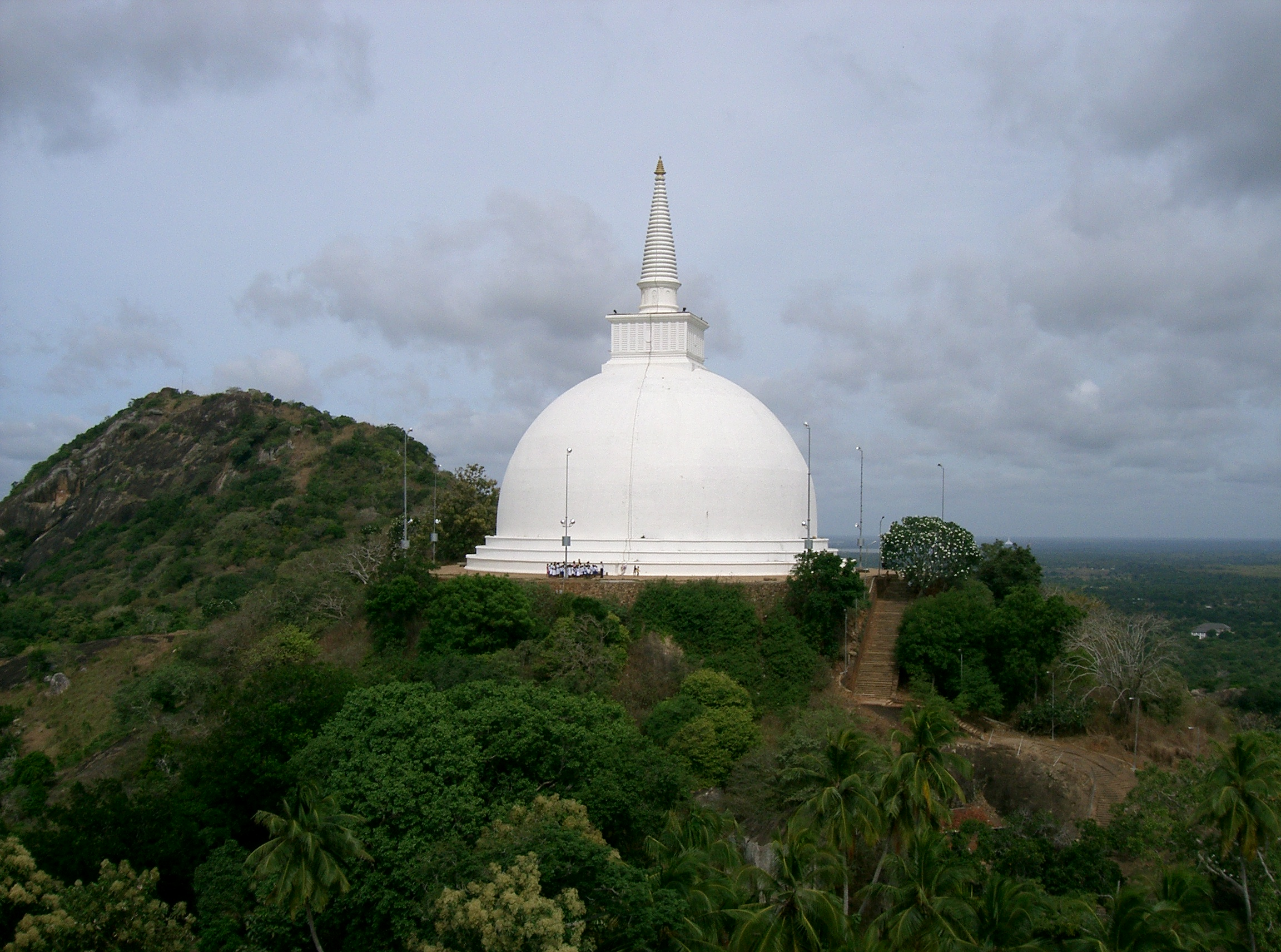
Maha Stupa.

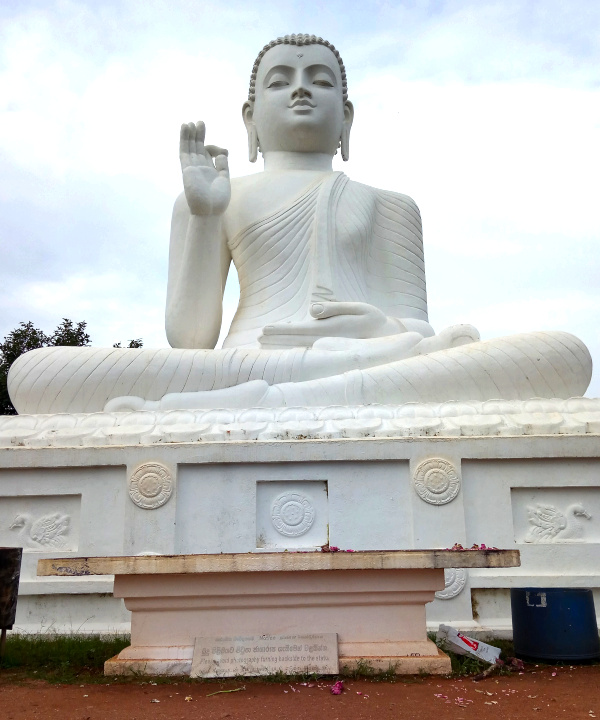
Buddha Statue at Mihintale, Sri Lanka

This large stupa known as the Maha Seya is on the summit of the Mihintale hill, built by King Mahadathika Mahanaga (7-19 AD) the base of which is 136 ft (41 m) in diameter. The stupa which was in a dilapidated condition was completely restored.

=== Aradhana Gala ===
Which faces Maha Seya is on a summit of a hill. Even during very windy weather pilgrims do not fail to visit this rock, which has iron railings to help them to climb. In ancient books such as the Mahavamsa it is written that Mahinda came to Sri Lanka by travelling through the air. He came down and landed on the top of the Aradhana Gala where he met King Devanampiyatissa for the first time.

=== Kaludiya Pokuna ===
Kaludiya pokuna.

Is one of the famous ponds at Mihintale. The word "Kalu" means black. The word "diya" means water, and the word "pokuna" means pond. The name is derived from the fact that the water in the pond appears to be black in colour. It is believed that on new moon day Kalu Buddha Rakkhita Thera sat under the Thimbiriya tree, close to the Kaludiya Pokuna, and preached a sermon based on the Kalakarama Sutta.

=== Naga Pokuna ===
Naga Pokuna means "Serpent Pond." Its name is derived from the figures of snakes with their hoods spread out in the background; it is one of the most famous ponds at the site. Passing Ambasthalaya on the western side is a flight of steps. When descending the steps the Naga Pokuna is visible.

Mahavansa mentions a pond named Nagacatuska connected with the information regarding the arrival of Thera Mahinda in Sri Lanka. Also the chronicle records much later that king Aggabodhi I (575-608 AD) built a pond named Nagasondi. From this information, it may be assumed that the natural pond, known as Nagacatusca, was converted to a man made pond by King Aggabodhi. Filled by rainwater, this pond supplies water to the Lion Pond, Alms Hall and for the daily needs of the Mihintala monks.

=== Singha Pokuna ===
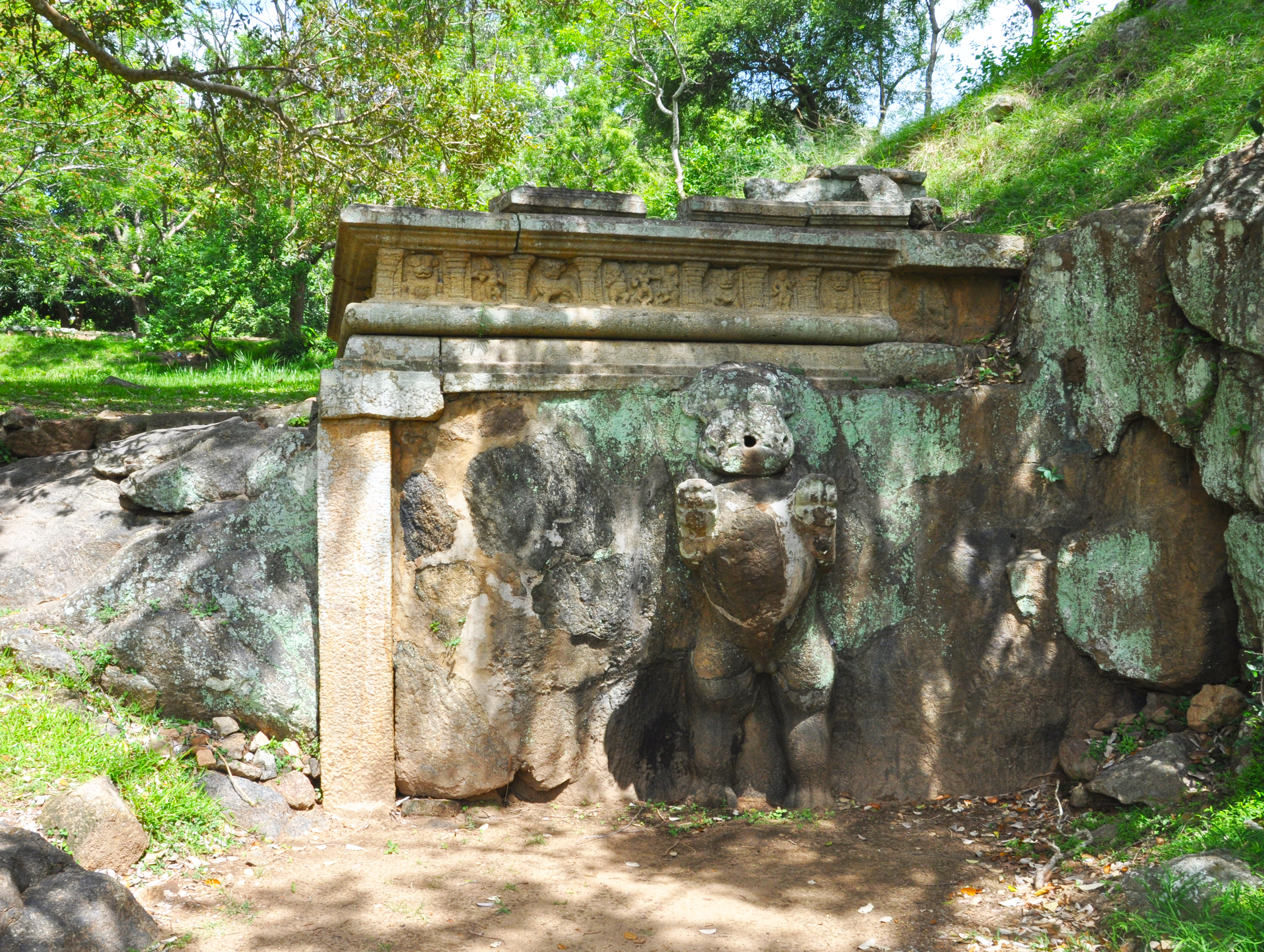
Monks lion Bath, (Sinha Pokuna in Sinhala) Mihintale

Singha Pokuna means "Lion Pond," the name was derived from the image of the rampant lion. Water was collected here for the use of bikkhus (monks). Water is supplied from the Naga Pokuna through a tunnel.

=== Buddha Statue ===
To the side of the Ambasthala Dagoba is a flight of rock-carved steps leading to a large white Buddha statue.

== See also ==
- Buddhism
- Mahawamsa
- Anuradhapura
- Ancient Mihintale monastic complex
