= Avantirastra =

One of the Maurya Empire's five original provinces

- 322 BCE–185 BCE
- Capital: Ujjain
  - Type: Viceroyalty
- History
  - Established: 322 BCE
  - Disestablished: 185 BCE
- Today part of: Madhya Pradesh

Avantirastra (Sanskrit: अवन्तिराष्ट्र) was one of the five original provinces of the Maurya Empire gained after the overthrow of the Nanda dynasty by Chandragupta Maurya. It was located in the modern-day Malwa region with its capital at Ujjain.

Ashoka served as viceroy of the region during his father Bindusara's reign.
