= Ancient constructions of Sri Lanka =

The ancient Sinhalese excelled in the construction of tanks (Wevas) or reservoirs, dagobas (or stupas), and palaces in Sri Lanka, as evident from the ruins which displays a rich variety of architectural forms.

== Irrigation works ==
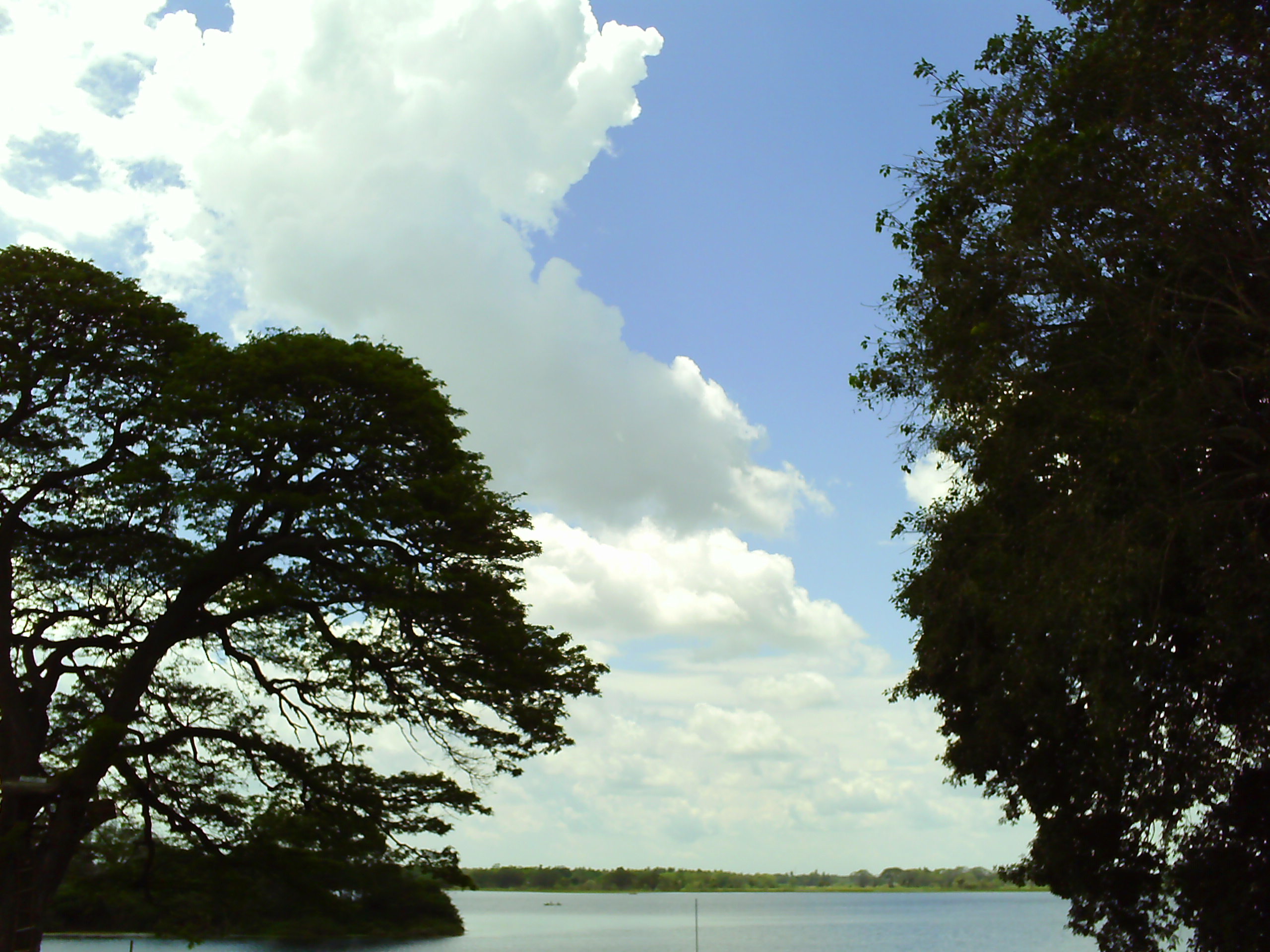
Tissa Wewa (Tissamaharama), an ancient reservoir

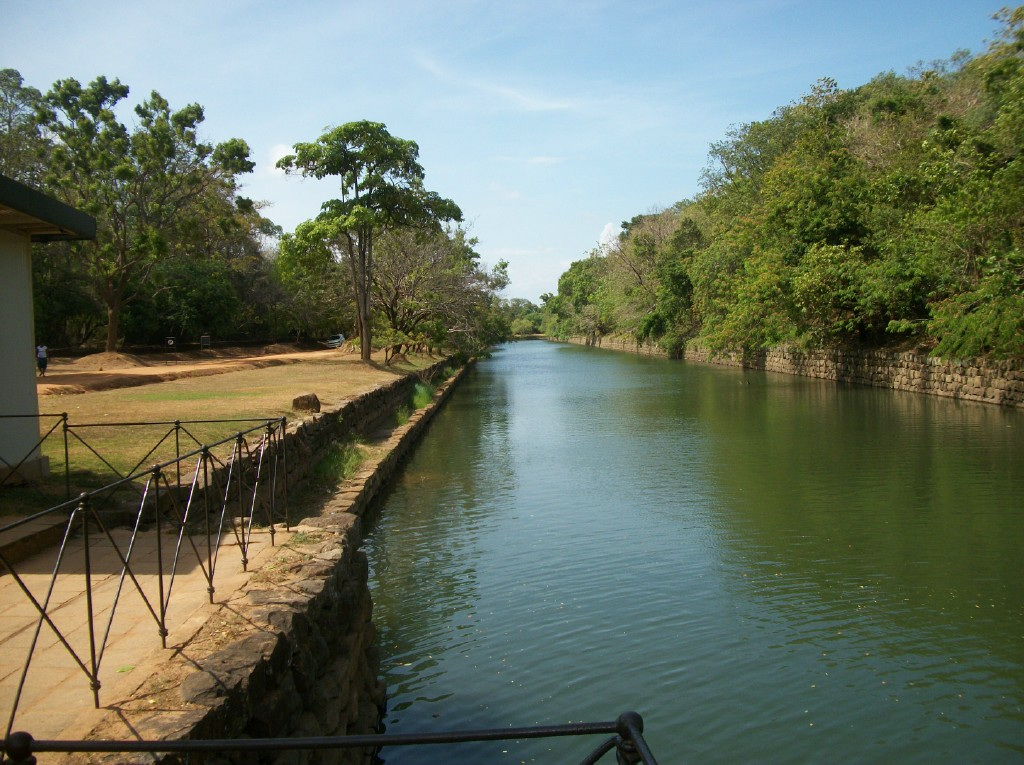
Sigiriya moat

Major irrigation schemes of Sri Lanka, as evident from the earliest written records in the Mahawansa, date back to the fourth century BCE (Parker, 1881; Brohier, 1934). The purpose and determination in the construction of the irrigation systems are depicted by the words of Parakrama Bahu I, 1153–1186 CE: "Let not even a drop of rain water go to the sea without benefiting man".

The Sri Lankan chronicle, the Culavamsa which was written in the Buddhist canonical language Pali, enumerates his works both as a provincial ruler in western Sri Lanka and later as the monarch of the whole country: he either built or restored 163 major tanks (reservoirs), 2,617 minor tanks, 3,910 irrigation channels, 328 stone sluices and 168 sluice blocks, besides repairing 1,969 breaches in embankments. Among the reservoirs he built was the tank at Polonnaruwa, called on account of its size the Parakrama Samudra (translation: Sea of Parakrama). With an area of 30 square kilometres (12 square miles) and an enclosing embankment 14 kilometres (8.7 mi) long, it irrigated nearly 100 km^{2} (39 sq mi).

The final achievements were highlighted by Sir Henry Ward, Governor of Ceylon:

It is possible, that in no other part of the world are there to be found within the same space, the remains of so many works of irrigation, which are, at the same time, of such great antiquity, and of such vast magnitude as Ceylon. Probably no other country can exhibit works so numerous, and at the same time so ancient and extensive, within the same limited area, as this Island.

=== Reservoirs ===
A wealth of river basin-based water heritage is abundant in Sri Lanka. Reservoirs of Sri Lanka are different from the water tanks seen in ancient civilisations or bodies of water collected for purposes such as generation of electricity or supplying water for consumption.

Tanks are locally termed Weva (plural: Wew).

- Viji Wewa
- Ridiyagama
- Badagiriya
- Muruthawela
- Hurulu weva
- Abhayavapi tank
- Mamaduwa Wewa
- Angamuwa Wewa
- Bandagiriya Wewa
- Basawakkulama Wewa (Abaya Wewa)
- Bathalagoda Wewa
- Debara Wewa
- Erupothana Wewa
- Giritale Wewa
- Iratperiyakulama Wewa
- Kala Wewa
- Kande Ela Reservoir
- Kandy Lake (Nuwara Weva)
- Kantale Wewa
- Kaudulla Wewa
- Kondawattuwana Wewa
- Lunugamwehera
- Mahagala Wewa
- Mahakanadarawa Wewa
- Mahavilachchiya Wewa
- Minneriya Tank
- Mutukelina Wewa
- Nachchaduwa wewa
- Nuwara Wewa (Anuradhapura}
- Padaviya Wewa
- Panda Wewa
- Parakrama Samudraya or Sea of Parakrama
- Pavakkulama Wewa
- Sorabora Wewa
- Tabbowa Wewa
- Thuruwila Wewa
- Tissa Wewa (Anuradhapura)
- Tissa Wewa (Tissamaharama)
- Urusita Wewa
- Siyambalangamuwa Wewa
- Vavunikulama Wewa
- Weerawila Wewa
- Wilpita Wewa / Lenabatuwa Wewa
- Yoda Wewa (Mannar)
- Yoda Wewa (Tissamaharama)
- Kuda Vilachchiya Wewa

== Stupas of ancient Sri Lanka ==
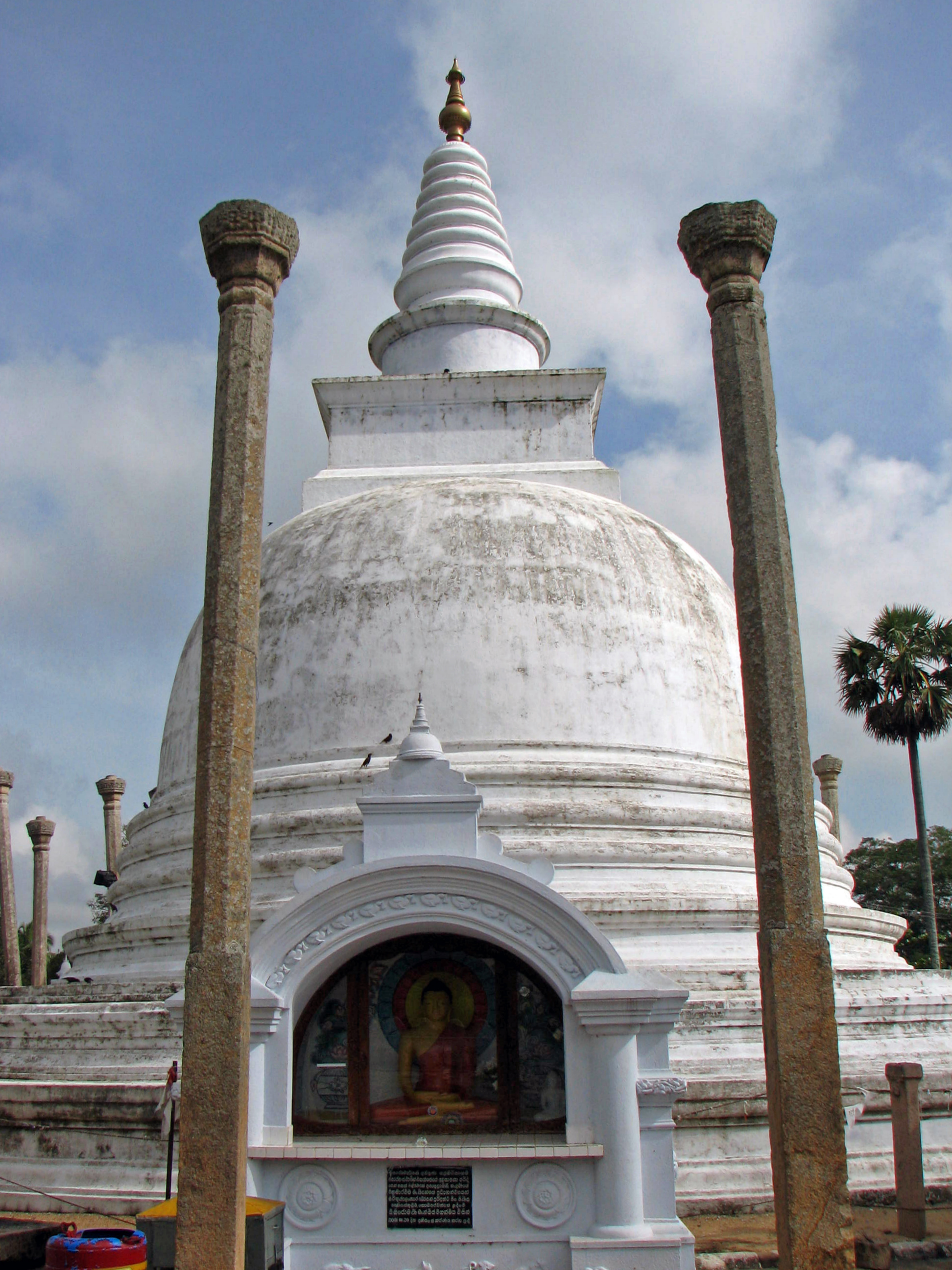
Thuparamaya stupa, Anuradhapura

The dagobas, or stupas, are distinctive for many reasons. They are probably the largest brick structures known to the pre-modern world. Demala Maha Seya, which was never completed, had a circumference of 2,011 feet (613 m). Jetavanaramaya is the largest stupa constructed in any part of the world. It is over 120 metres (390 ft) in height and has a diameter of 367 feet (112 m). The foundation is 252 feet (77 m) deep. The deepest-known foundation of the ancient world. It needed bricks that could bear the load of 368 pounds (167 kg). Jetavanaramaya was the third-tallest building in the ancient world. Abhayagiri (370 feet (110 m)) ranked fifth and Ruwanwelisaya (300 feet (91 m)) came seventh. The first, fourth, and sixth places were held by the pyramids.

- Ruwanwelisaya
- Thuparamaya
- Ridi Vihara
- Lovamahapaya
- Abhayagiri Dagaba
- Jetavanarama
- Mirisaveti Stupa
- Lankarama
- Isurumuniya
- Rathna Prasadaya
- Dakkhina Stupa
- Sela Cetiya
- Naka Vihara
- Kiribath Vehera
- Pubbarama
- Tapovana

== Hindu Temples of ancient Sri Lanka ==
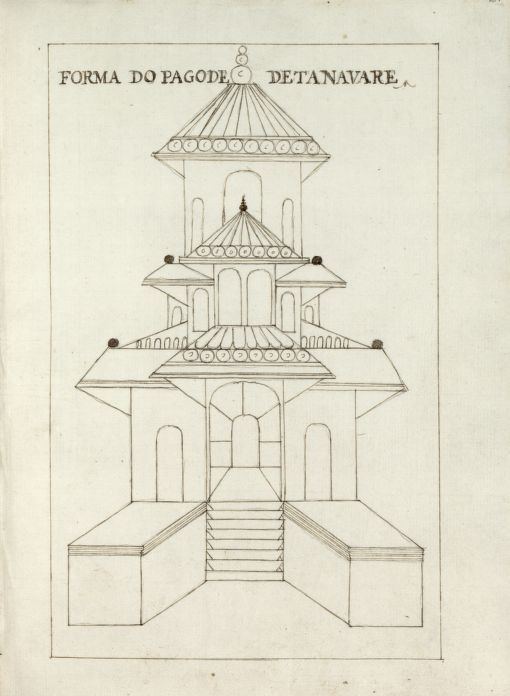
The Temple of Tenavarai Kovil, Thevan Thurai. Original painting/drawing name: "Forma do Pagode de Tanavare" from Plantas das fortalezas, pagodes & ca. da ilha de Ceilão (Portuguese)

The Pancha Ishwarams (five abodes of Shiva) are five coastal ancient kovils (temples) built in dedication to the Hindu supreme being Ishwara in the form of the god Shiva, located along the circumference of Sri Lanka.

These complexes were highly praised by scholars and historians since the antiquity. The most impressive of these five magnificent and decorated temple complexes was the Tenavaram temple. Built on vaulted arches on the promontory overlooking the Indian Ocean. The central gopuram tower of the vimana and the other gopura towers that dominated the town were covered with plates of gilded brass, gold and copper on their roofs. Its outer body featured intricately carved domes, with elaborate arches and gates opening to various verandas and shrines of the complex, giving Tenavaram the appearance of a golden city to sailors who visited the port to trade and relied on its light reflecting gopura roofs for navigational purposes.

The Moroccan traveller Ibn Battuta visited the temple in the 14th century and described the deity Dinawar as sharing the same name as the flourishing trade town in which He resided, made of gold and the size of a man with two large rubies as eyes "that lit up like lanterns during the night." One thousand Hindus and Yogis were attached to this vast temple for services, with five hundred girls that danced and sang in front of the Mahavishnu idol.

- Naguleswaram
- Ketheeswaram
- Koneswaram
- Munneswaram
- Tondeswaram

== Cave Temples of ancient Sri Lanka ==
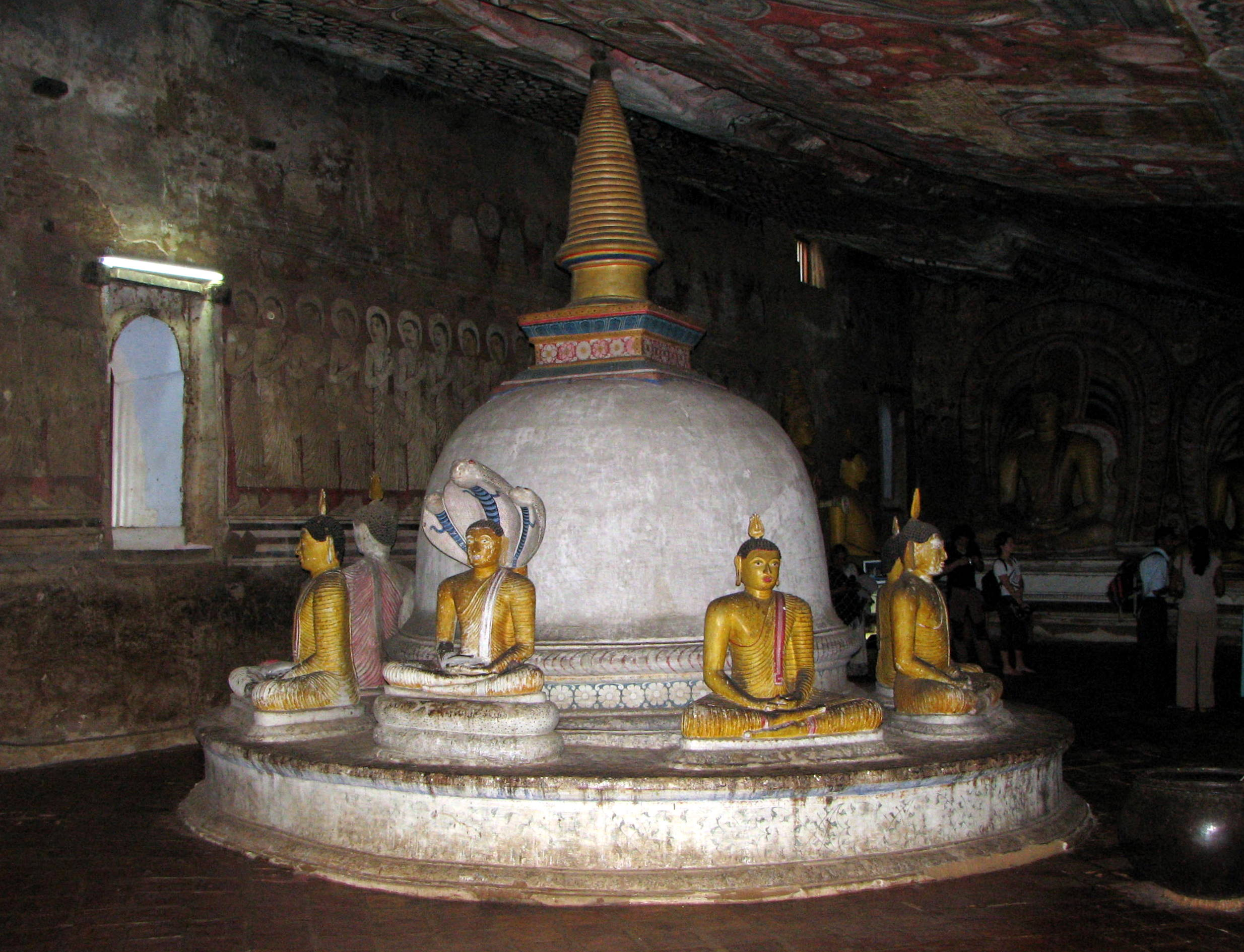
Buddha statues in Dambulla Rock Temple

Cave temples had been used in Sri Lanka since ancient times, fine examples if these include the magnificent cave temple complex in Dambulla built by king Valagamba. Cave temples has preserved some of the best examples of Sinhalese art and Sinhalese architecture. In the years gone by of monarchy rule in ancient Sri Lanka the rock cave shelters cloistered in the recess of the forests served the recluse Buddhist monks in performing their meditation chores and other religious observances. Such cave hermitages were patronised by the ruling kings of the time, chieftains and the people as well. As the years passed, such cave shelters turned into len viharas (cave temples) and len avasas (abodes of Buddhist monks). Such len (cave shelters), were donated by kings, queens and other royalty and nobility. Foremost among such noble chieftains were the paramukas (chieftain of royal rank holding multiple designations).

- Vessagiri
- Dambulla Rock Temple
- Pilikuththuwa Raja Maha Vihara
- Aluvihara Rock Cave Temple
- Dimbulagala Raja Maha Vihara
- Bogoda and Dowa cave temples
- Kinihiri Kanda Temple

== Palaces of ancient Sri Lanka ==
- Queen's Palace
- Sigiriya built in the 5th century CE was a combination of natural and man made fortress built around a 200-metre-tall (660 ft) rock on which was the royal Sky Palace. It is world-renowned for the beautiful Sigiriya frescoes.

== Landscaping in ancient Sri Lanka ==
- Magul Uyana
- Mahamevnāwa Gardens
- Ranmasu Uyana

== Royal Baths of ancient Sri Lanka ==
- Kuttam Pokuna

== Sculpture in ancient Sri Lanka ==
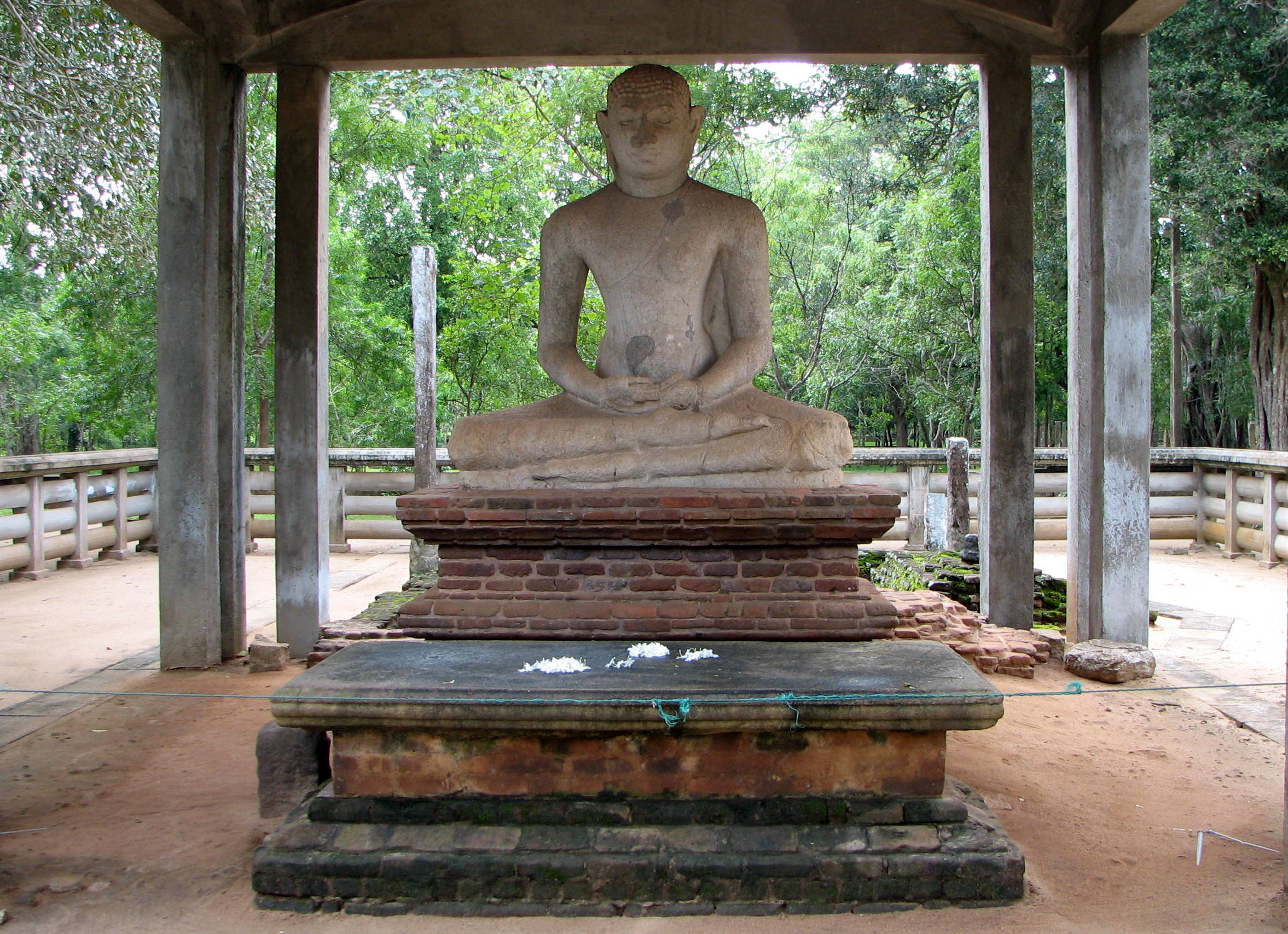
Samadhi Statue, Anuradhapura

- Samadhi Statue
- Toluwila Statue
- Avukana Buddha Statue
- Buduruwagala Statue
- Rasvehera Statue
- Maligawila Buddha statue
