= Stupas in Sri Lanka =

Type of architectural creation

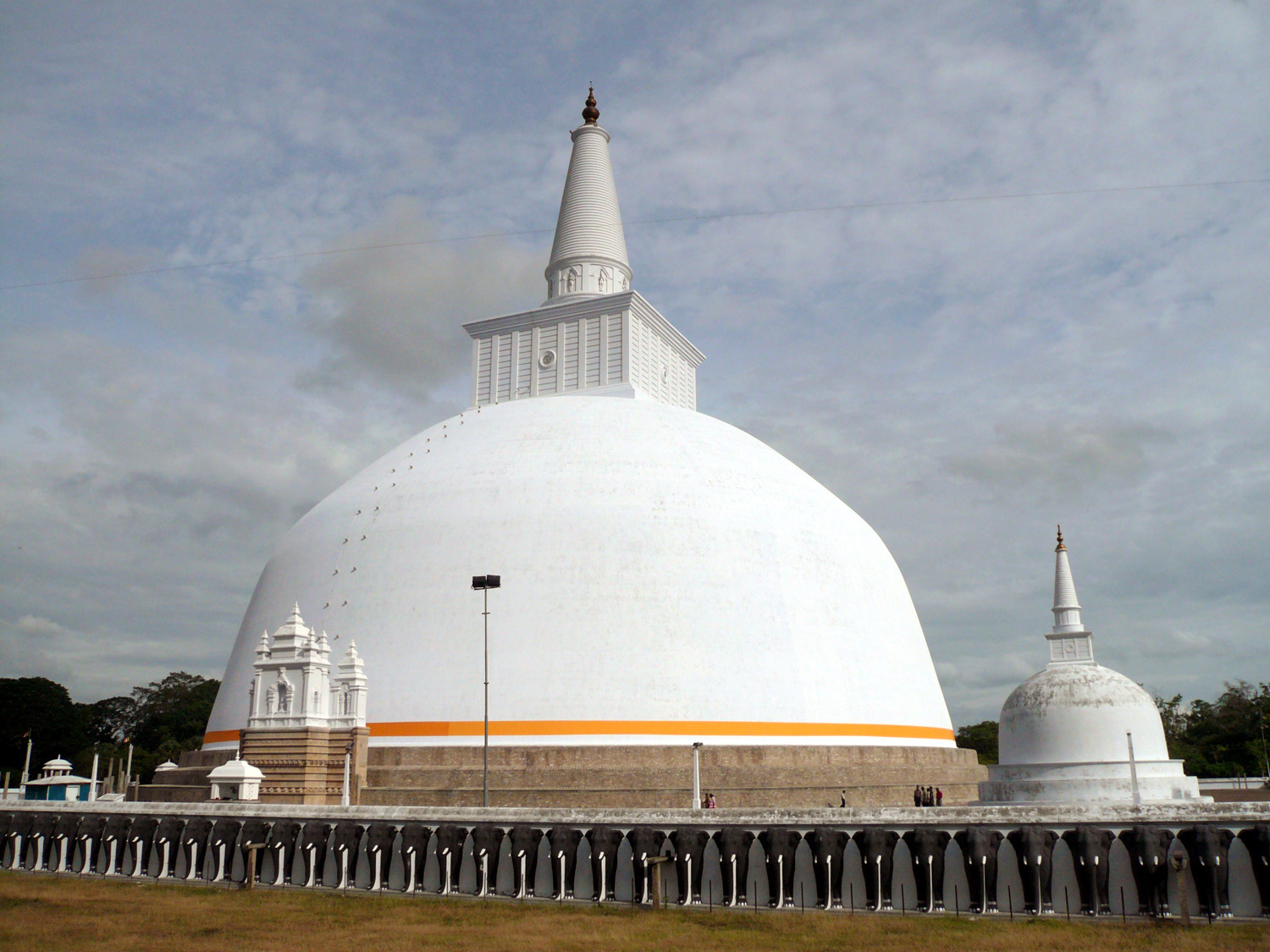
Ruwanwelisaya, a cetiya in the sacred city of Anuradhapura, Sri Lanka.

Stupas, also called dagebas (also spelt dagobas) and cetiyas, are considered an outstanding type of architectural creation of ancient Sri Lanka. Under the influence of Buddhism, there were several changes in the field of architecture in Sri Lanka. The stupa commands a prominent place among these changes. The Stupa is also known by synonymous names such as Chaithya, Dagaba, Thupa, Seya and Vehera. Stupas designed and constructed in Sri Lanka are the largest brick structures known to the pre-modern world.

After Rev. Mahinda thero introduced Buddhism during the reign of King Devanampiya Tissa of Anuradhapura (307–267 BCE), in the Sri Lanka's ancient sacred capital of Anuradhapura, the king built the Anuradhapura Maha Viharaya, a mahavihara, after dedicating the Nandana and Mahamega royal pleasure gardens to the Maha Sangha. The earliest monument found in Sri Lanka is the Stupa, which is described as a hemispherical dome surmounted with a spire (kota).

Mahiyangana Raja Maha Vihara in Mahiyangana, Uva Province is regarded as the first stupa of ancient Sri Lanka The first historical stupa constructed after the arrival of Mahinda in Sri Lanka is Thuparamaya, which was built during the reign of King Devanampiya Tissa. Afterwards many stupas were built, some colossal stupas, biggest of which is Jetavanaramaya.

== History of Stupas ==
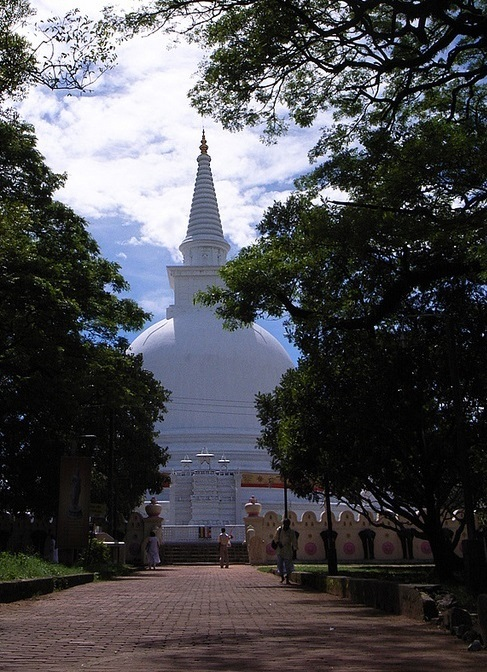
Mahiyangana Stupa is the first stupa of ancient Sri Lanka

There are two recorded instances regarding the construction of stupas in Sri Lanka in the lifetime of Gautama Buddha. One of those instances is the construction of the cetiya at Mahiyangana Raja Maha Vihara at Mahiyangana in the valley of Mahaweli, which enshrines the Buddha's Hair Relic reputedly presented by the Buddha to Saman, a deva. The other instance is the construction of a stupa at Tiriyaya enshrining the Hair Relics presented to the tradesman brothers Tapussa and Bhallika from Okkalapa (present-day Yangon). The gift of the Hair Relics to the brothers is explicitly mentioned in the Pali Tipitaka. The latter This event is mentioned in an inscription written in Sanskrit found at this site.

During the time of Ashoka, numerous ‘stupas’ were built at hallowed sites in India. In these were enshrined relics of the Buddha which people venerated. When it was observed that there were no Buddha relics in Sri Lanka, the king, at Mahinda's suggestion, appealed to Emperor Asoka to send some relics. He responded to the king's request and sent the right collarbone relic of the Buddha. King Devanam Piya Tissa built the Thuparamaya to enshrine this relic, the right collarbone of the Buddha. The Thuparamaya is regarded as the first ever historical stupa built in Sri Lanka. The building of colossal stupas started during the reign of King Dutugamunu. Afterward many kings built stupas.

== Construction of a stupa ==
The construction of stupas were considered acts of great merit. The purpose of stupas were mainly to enshrine the sacred relics of Lord Buddha. The design specifications are consistent within most of the stupas, entrances to stupas are laid out so that their centre lines point to the relic chambers.

The stupas were covered with a coating of lime plaster, plaster combinations changed with the requirements of the design, items used included lime, clay, sand, pebbles, crushed seashells, sugar syrup, white of egg, coconut water, plant resin, drying oil, glues and saliva of white ants. The fine plaster at Kiri Vehera used small pebbles, crushed seashells mixed with lime and sand were used in the stupas from the fifth to twelfth centuries.

== Parts ==
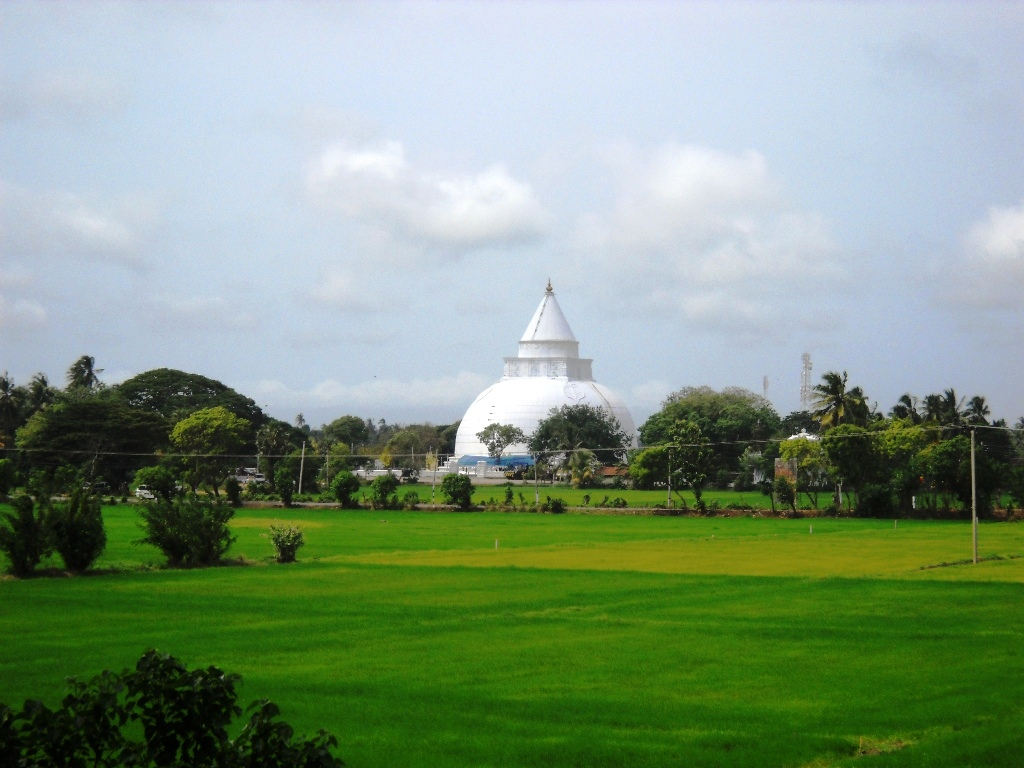
Tissamaharama Stupa across the paddy fields (Gharbaya, Hatharas Kotuwa, Devatha Kotuwa, Koth Kerella and Kotha of the stupa are visible).

A stupa usually has six parts:

- Pesavalalu – berms or terraces

A stupa consists of three such berms at its base. The three berms rising from the base gradually reduce in size.

- Gharbaya – hemispherical dome

The hemispherical dome is constructed on the three berms. In the middle of the dagaba was built a relic chamber (dhathu garbhaya). The Buddha's relics are enshrined there. In the centre of the Relic Chamber was placed a bo-tree made of precious metals, and an image of the Buddha round which were groups of figures representing various events in the life of the Buddha.

- Hatharas Kotuwa - tee cube

Relics are enshrined in this part too.

- Devatha Kotuwa - cylindrical neck

This is built on the Hatharas Kotuwa. Figures of deities are carved on the surface.

- Koth Kerella - conical spire

This is built on the Devatha Kotuwa. A crystal (chudamanikya) on a pinnacle made of metal is placed at the top of the spire to adorn it.

- Kotha – also called "silumina" in Sinhala. This is usually a pinnacle made of metal on top of which is a precious crystal or gemstone (chudamanikya).

There are other constructions associated with the stupa:

- Vahalkada (frontispiece)

This is a structure constructed joining the stupa at its four cardinal directions as a decorative flourish. Later these frontispieces came to be decorated or embellished with designs such as the creeper design. Stone slabs erected for the purpose of offering flower at the stupa too have been added to these frontispieces.

- Chethiyagara (shrine house) or Vatadage (circular relic chamber)

The chetiyagara is a structure constructed as a protection chamber for the stupa. There is evidence to show that such chambers were erected to shelter the small stupas built during the early years. The roofs of these structures are believed to have been wooden.

== Types of Stupas ==
Basically, a stupa has several salient features. Buddhist literature mentions six types of stupas differing according to the shape of the dome or body of a dagaba. This is mentioned in "Vijayantha Potha".

They are:

- Dhanyakara - Heap of paddy shape

e.g. : Kelaniya stupa

- Ghantakara - Bell shape

e.g. : Ambastala dagaba at Mihintale

- Bubbulakara - Bubble shape

e.g. : Ruwanweli Maha Seya at Anuradhapura, Rankoth Vehera & Kiri Vehera at Pollonnaruwa

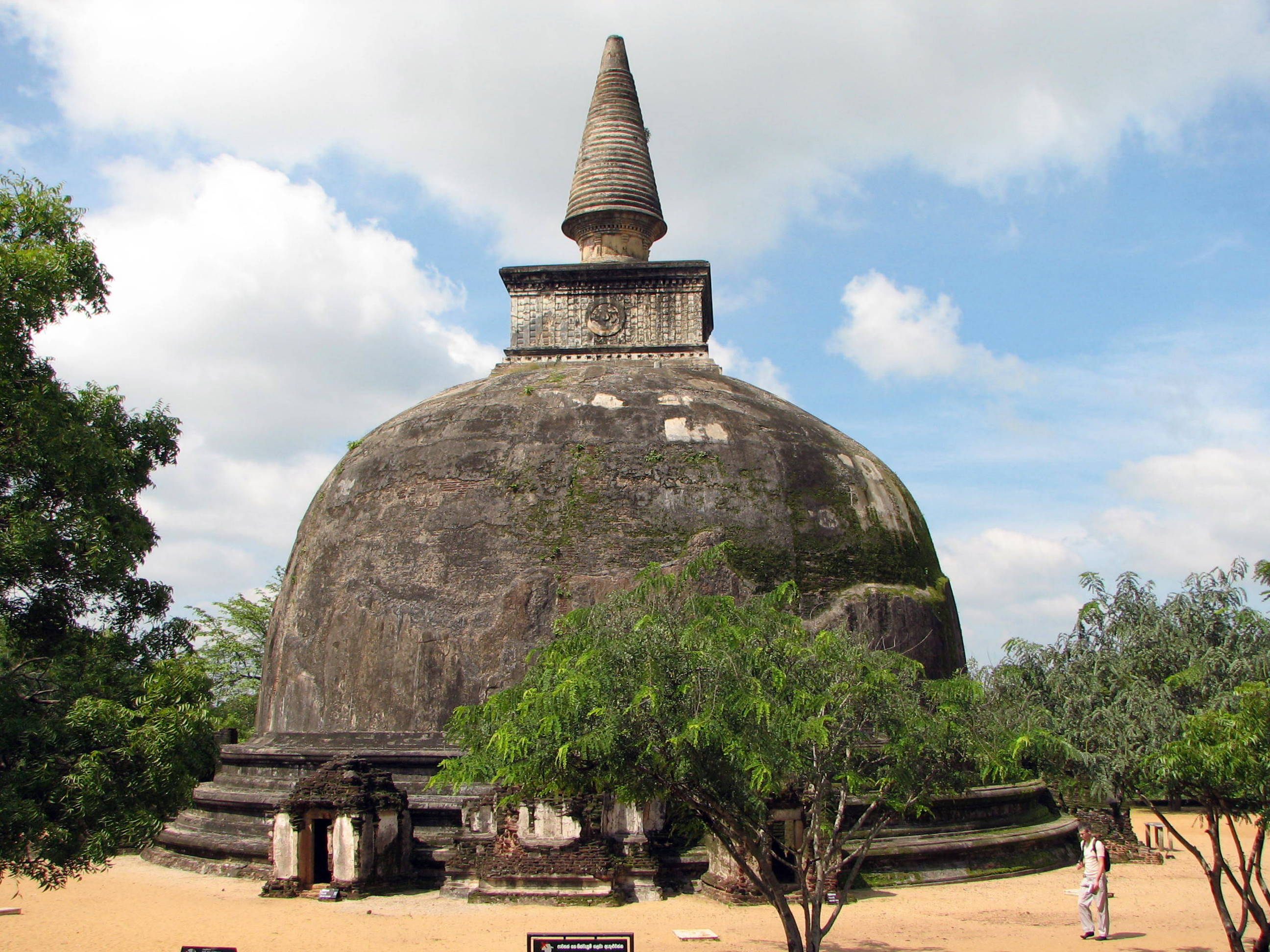
Kiri Vihara stupa, Polonnaruwa has the 'Bubble shape'

- Ghatakara - Pot shape

e.g. : Situlpavwa, Somawathiya, Kiri Vehera at Kataragama

- Padmakara - Lotus shape

e.g. : Vijayarama at Anuradhapura, Puliyankulama, Indikatu Seya at Mihintale

- Amlakara - Shape of Nelli fruit (Phyllanthus emblica L.)

No records exist of the finding of this type of stupa in Sri Lanka.

Another type of stupa is mentioned in the book "Manju Sri Vasthu Vidya Shastra"

- Palandawakara - Shape of an onion

e.g. : Nadigamvila stupa

== Thuparamaya ==
King Devanam Piya Tissa built the Thuparama dagaba to enshrine the Right Collar Bone of Lord Buddha. The Thuparama is regarded as the first ever historical stupa built in Sri Lanka. Originally it was in the shape of a heap of paddy but as restorations were done in later years, it took the form as seen today. It has a diameter of 59 feet 6 inches (18.14 m) at the base. As the name suggests, Thuparama comprised a ‘stupa’ and an ‘arama,’ a residential complex. Ruins of such a complex can be seen within an area of over 3 acres (12,000 m^{2}) around the ‘stupa.’

== Great stupas of Sri Lanka ==
The ‘stupas’ built later on were much larger than the Thuparama.It is accepted that the building of colossal stupas started during the reign of King Dutugemunu. King Dutugemunu (161-137 BC) built the Mirisaveti which has a diameter of 168 feet (51 m) at the base and the most venerated ‘stupa’ - Ruvanvali Mahaseya, also known as Ratnamali Mahathupa. While the base has a diameter of 289 feet (88 m), the height is given as 120 cubits (‘riyan’), equivalent to around 300 feet (91 m). It took the form of ‘bubbulakara’ or bubble shape. When the Abhyayagiri dagaba was originally built by King Vattagamani (Valagamba - 103 BC) it was not very large but later enlargements made it larger than the Mahathupa.

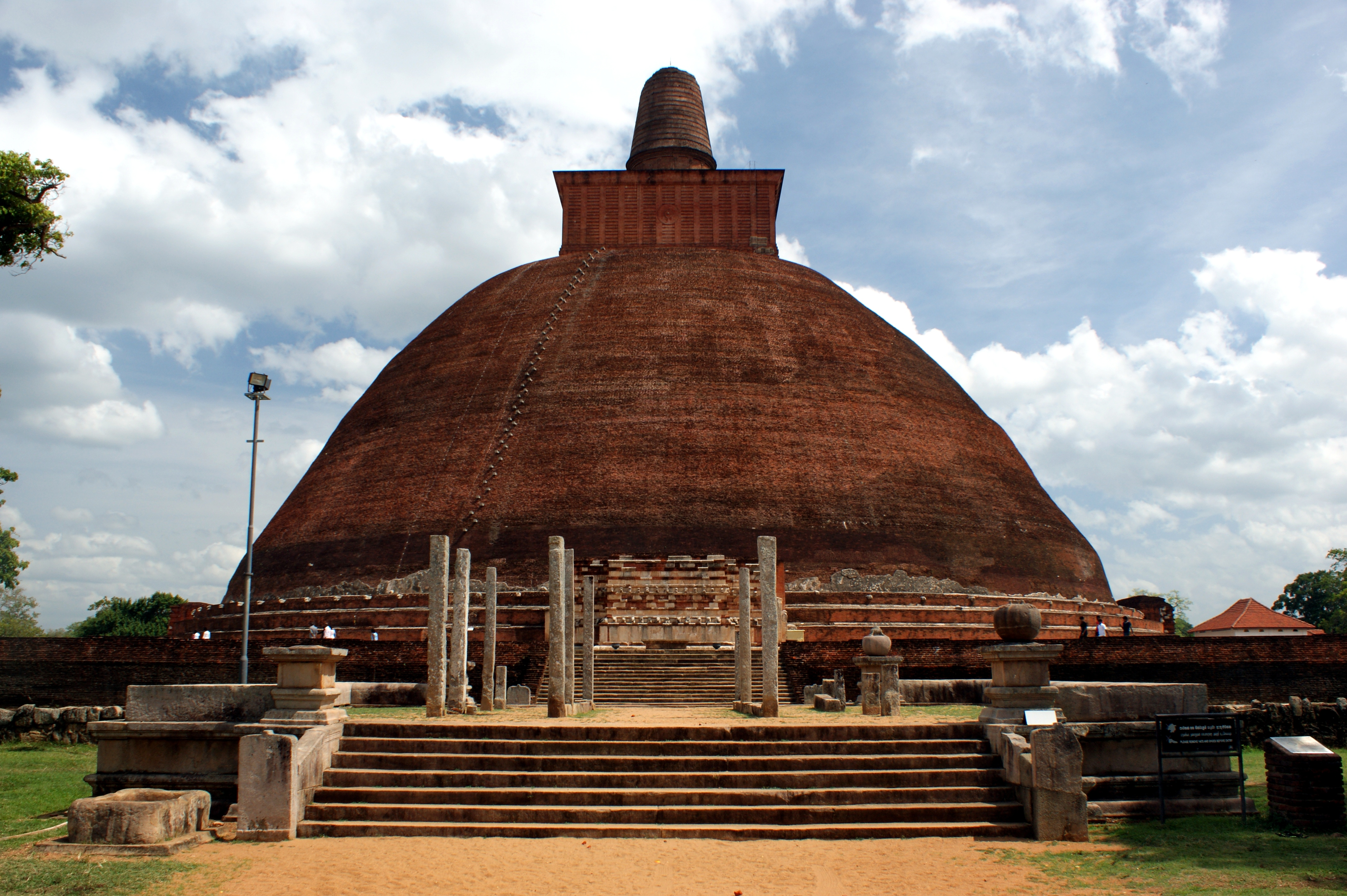
Jetavanaramaya in Anuradhapura is the biggest brick structure in the world.

King Mahasena (276-303 CE) is credited with building the largest of them all - the Jetavana, which has a diameter of 367 feet (112 m) at the base. Though the present height is estimated at 232 feet (71 m), the original height is supposed to have been 400 feet. The main feature of Jetavana is its foundation, which goes all the way to the bedrock and 25 feet (7.6 m) deep. The height of Jetavana and the depth of the footing is approximately equal. Large stupas were also built at Mihintale at the site where Arahat Mahinda met the king, Magama, Dighavapi (near Ampara), Kataragama and other places. The builders of ‘stupas’ in Sri Lanka had closely followed the designs of such monuments built in Sanchi and other places in India. In huge monuments, the dome rose from a triple-based platform. The dome was surmounted by a square railing of wood or stone which later became a cube of masonry. A stone pillar embedded in the dome rose above the railing. The ‘stupa’ was crowned by an umbrella (‘chattra’) or a series of umbrellas.

== Small stupas ==
The Kantaka Chaitya in Mihintale is a fine example of a small dageba. It features some of the finest stone carvings and terra cotta figures. They are well preserved to this day. The presence of a ‘vahalkada’ or front piece is another interesting feature in this chaitya. There are carvings of animal figures, pot and foliage and other familiar ornamental motifs. These front pieces seen in most dagebas project from the base and face the cardinal points.

== Vatadage ==
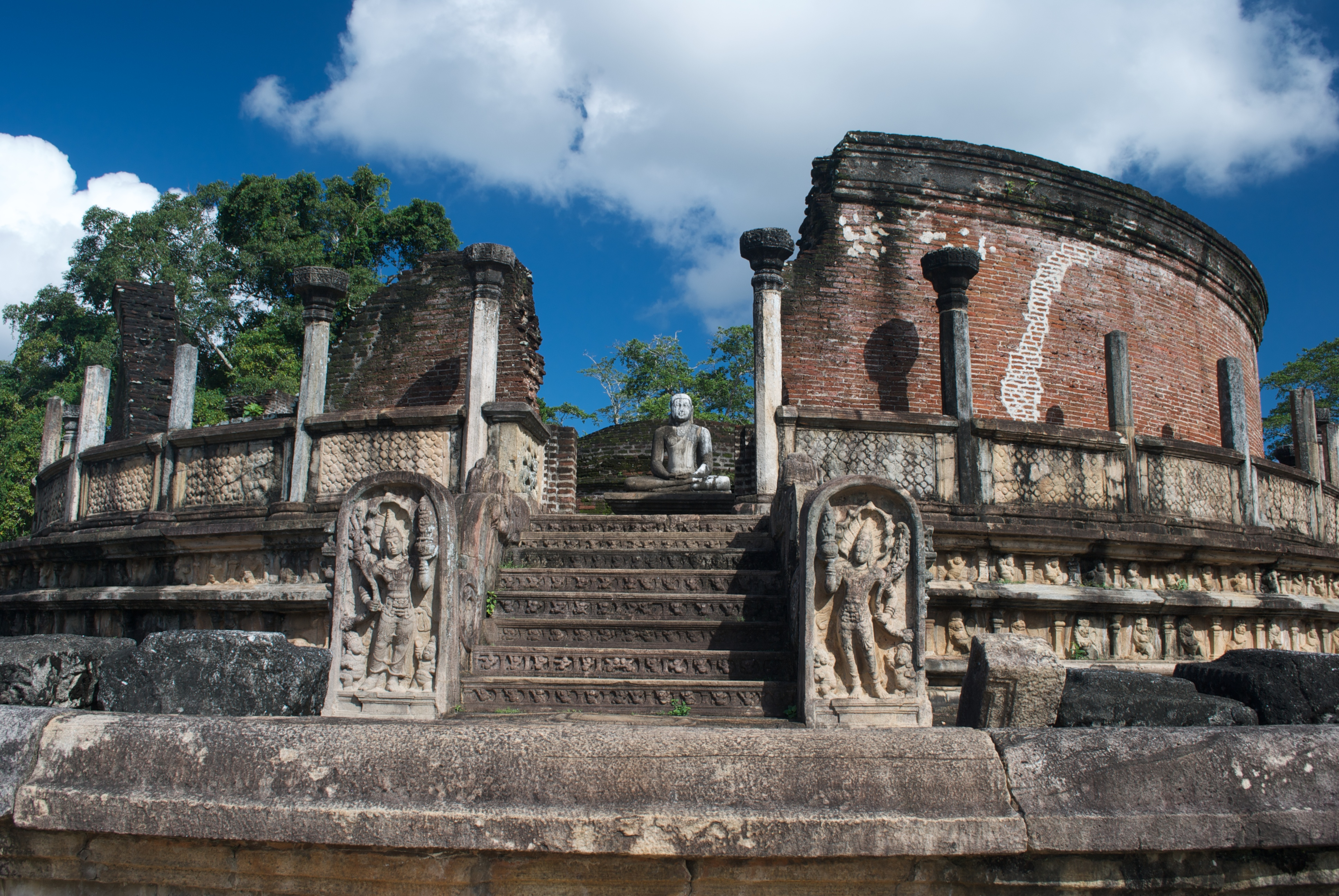
The Polonnaruwa Vatadage.

It can be observed that after the 4th century, the building of colossal dagebas has virtually ended. Thereafter smaller ones have been built using Thuparama in Anuradhapura as a model. This type came to be known as ‘vatadage’ or rotunda. It is a circular relic house and apart from Thuparama and Lankarama in Anuradhapura, the best example is seen in Polonnaruwa.

There are two other beautiful ones at Medirigiriya close to Polonnaruwa and Tiriyaya off the Anuradhapura-Trincomalee road. These circular shrines enclosed stupas of smaller size and had wooden pillars right round. Later they were replaced by carved stone pillars. The pillars are arranged in four to two concentric circles, diminishing in size outwards.

== Notable stupas ==
- Ruwanwelisaya - King Dutugamunu

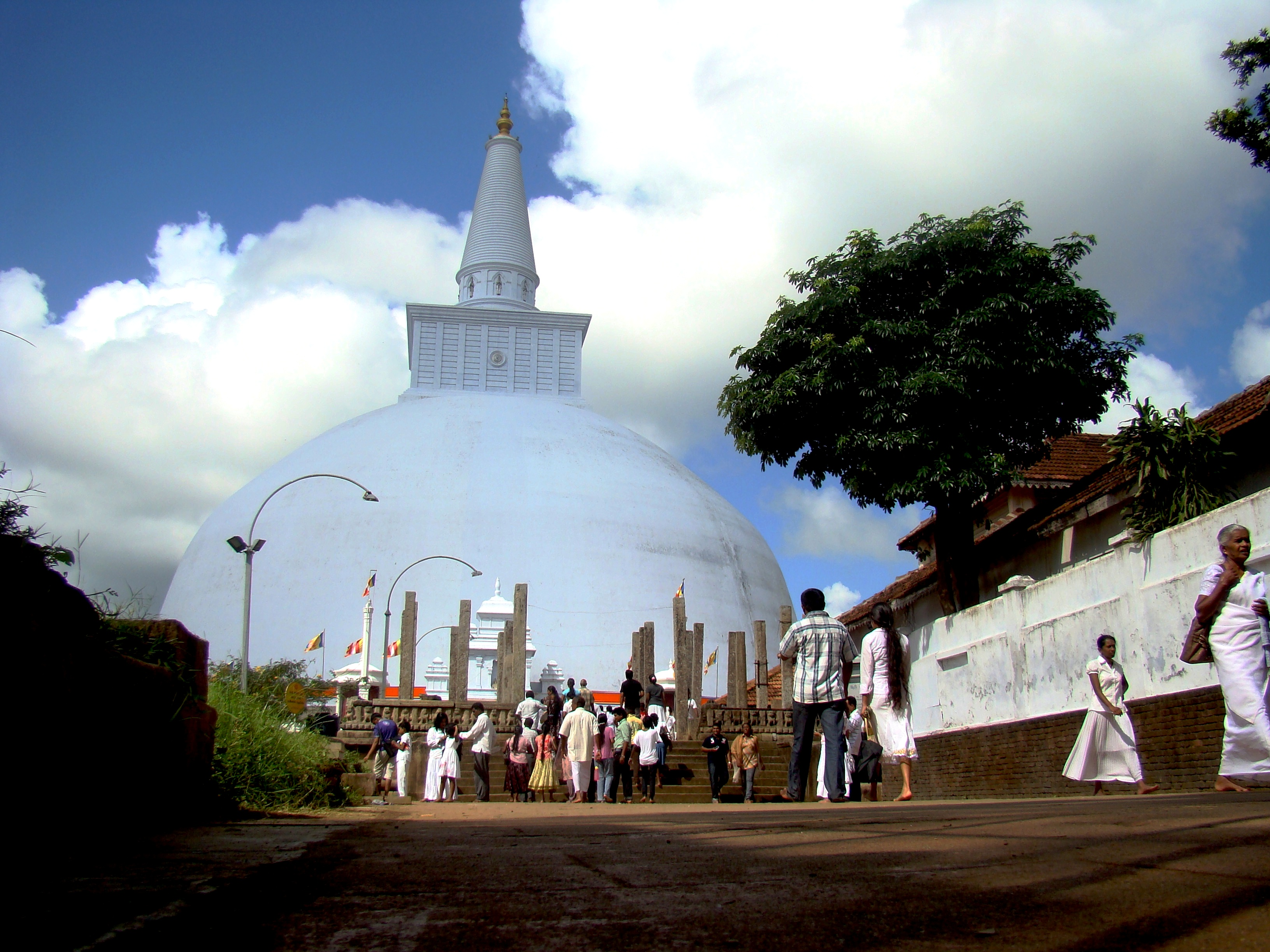
Ruwanwelisaya cent. 140 BC

- Thuparamaya - King Devanampiya Tissa
- Ridi Vihara - King Dutugemunu
- Abhayagiri Dagaba - King Valagamba
- Jetavanarama - King Mahasena
- Mirisaveti Stupa - King Dutugamunu
- Lankarama - King Valagamba
- Rathna Prasadaya - King Kanittha Tissa
- Dakkhina Stupa - Minister Uttiya
- Sela Cetiya - King Lajjitissa
- Naka Vihara
- Kiribath Vehera - Unknown
- Somawathiya Chaitya
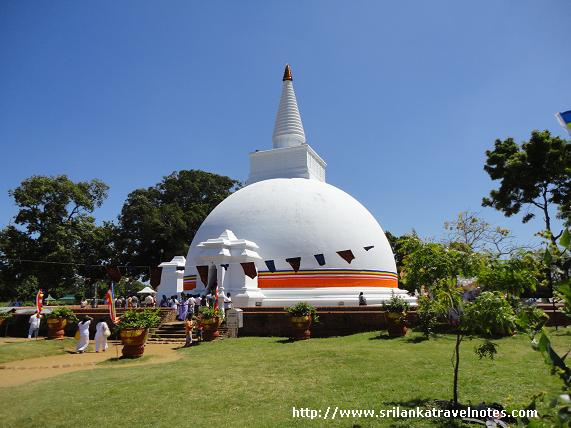
  Somawathiya Stupa
- Seruwawila Mangala Maha Seya(Seruwawila Tissa Maha Viharaya)- King Kavanthissa(2nd Century BC)
- Tissamaharamaya - King Kavan Tissa
- Wilgamwehera Somawathi Maha Seya, Seruwawila- King Giri Abaya(State King of Somapura-King Kavanthissa Period, 2nd Century BC)
- Kiri Vehera - King Mahasena, Kataragama
- Kiri Vehera, Polonnaruwa
- Rankoth Wehera, Polonnaruwa- King Parakramabahu the Great
- Neelagiriseya - King Kavan Tissa or King Bhathikabaya
- Kotmale Mahaweli Maha Seya completed in 2016
- Sandahiru Seya completed in 2021
- Kassapa Dalada Maha Seya, Benthara Galapatha Viharaya- King Parakramabahu the Second
- Sri Angulimala Maha Seya, Bowatta-Completed in 2020
- Sri Sathbudu Maha Stupa-Great Stupa of Seven Buddhas, Bandarawela-Completed in 2024
- Sri Ananda Maha Seya, Galnewa-Under Construction
- Sri Yashodara Maha Seya, Udupila-Completed in 2014

== Ancient technology associated with stupas ==
It is important to examine the technology applied in the construction of stupas comprising the features mentioned above. Examining the building of the foundation of a stupa to suit its size, one can get an idea of the application of the knowledge of science and geometry prevalent in ancient times. The Jetavana excavations conducted recently confirm that the construction of the platform or base on which a stupa stands has been very solid and strong. The skill shown by the craftsmen in maintaining the shape of the stupa reveals the advanced state of technology prevalent at the time. One wonders how the materials used in building Jetavanaramaya could have been carried to such a height.

== See also ==
- Cetiya
- Relics associated with Buddha
- History of Sri Lanka
- Ancient Constructions of Sri Lanka
- Architecture of ancient Sri Lanka
- Burmese pagoda
- Sand pagoda
