= Henry Parker (author) =

British irrigation engineer (born 1849)

Henry Parker (1849–unknown) was a British engineer in colonial Ceylon during the Victorian era. He was attached to the Irrigation Department from 1873 to 1904. During his work as an engineer he developed an admiration for the skills displayed by the ancient Sinhalese at the time of the construction of their reservoirs.

Parker is renowned for having studied and compiled the folklore of Sri Lanka, becoming an authority on the subject. He was the author of two books:

- Ancient Ceylon, London-Luzac & Co., First Published by the India Office (1909), is an account of the aboriginal and early civilization of Sri Lanka
- Village Folk-Tales of Ceylon. A voluminous compilation of folk tales collected and translated by the author.

== See also ==
- Ancient constructions of Sri Lanka
- Irrigation works in ancient Sri Lanka
