= Ruwanwelisaya =

Buddhist stupa in Anuradhapura, Sri Lanka

Ruwanweli Maha Seya
- රුවන්වැලි මහා සෑය
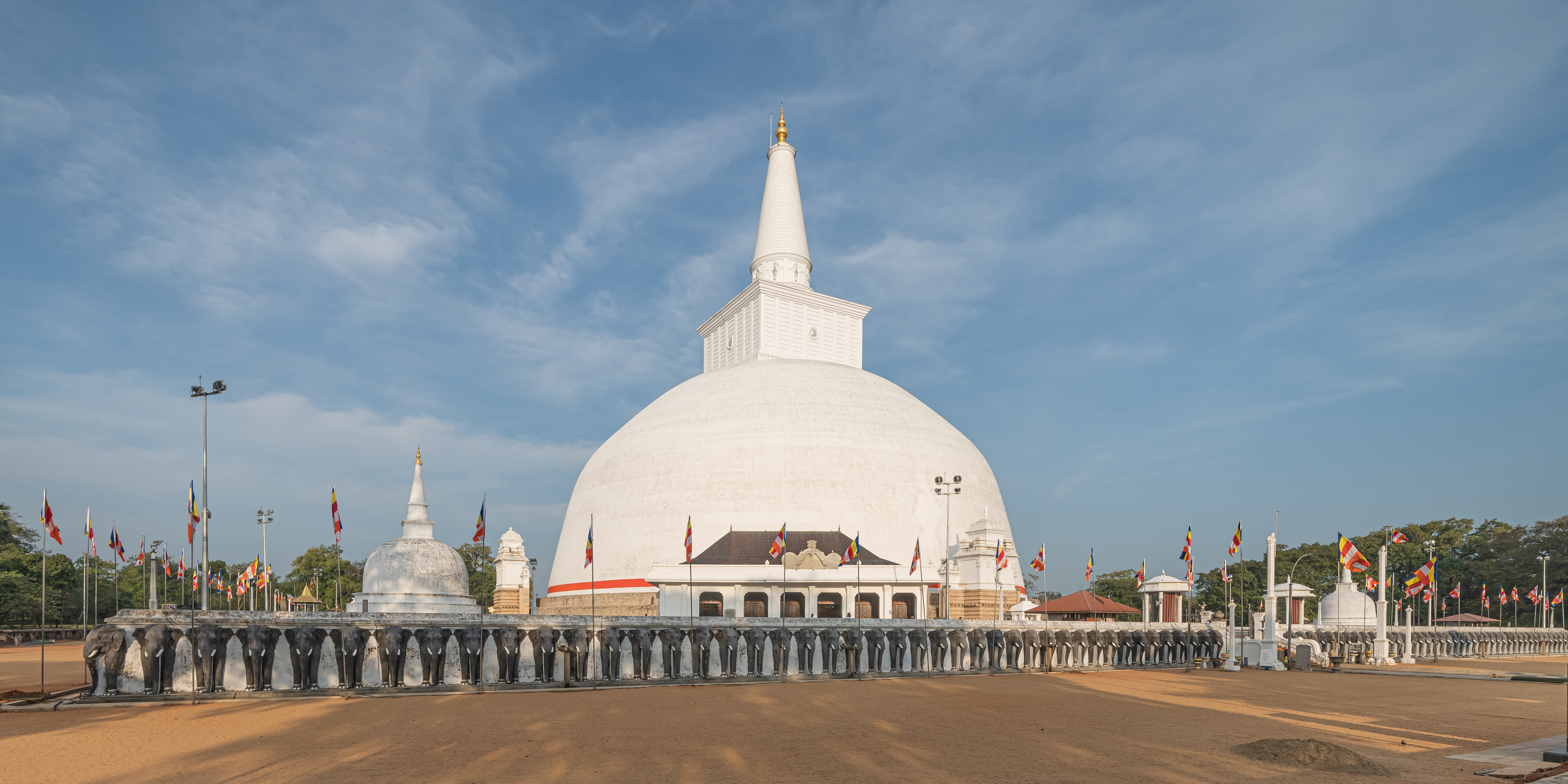
- The Ruwanwelisaya Stupa

- Location in Sri Lanka

Religion
- Affiliation: Buddhism other_info =: Sect: [[{{{sect}}}]]

Location
- Location: Anuradhapura, Sri Lanka
- Country: Sri Lanka
- Coordinates: 8°21′0″N 80°23′47″E

Architecture
- Founder: King Dutugamunu
- Completed: circa 140 BC; 2166 years ago

UNESCO World Heritage Site
- Official name: Sacred City of Anuradhapura
- Criteria: Cultural: ii, iii, vi
- Reference: 200
- Inscription: 1982 (6th Session)
Designations
Archaeological Protected Monument of Sri Lanka

Website
- https://www.facebook.com/RuwanweliMahaSeya

The Ruwanweli Maha Seya, also known as the Maha Thupa (lit. 'the Great Thupa'), is a stupa (a hemispherical structure containing relics) in Anuradhapura, Sri Lanka. Two quarts or one Dona of the Buddha's relics are enshrined in the stupa, making it the largest collection of his relics anywhere. It was built by Sinhalese King Dutugemunu in c. 140 B.C., who became king of Sri Lanka after a war in which the Chola King Elāra (Ellalan) was defeated. It is also known as Swarnamali Seya, Svaṇṇamāli Mahaceti (in Pali) and Rathnamali Seya.

This is one of the "Solosmasthana" (the 16 places of veneration) and the "Atamasthana" (the 8 places of veneration). The stupa is one of the world's tallest ancient monuments, standing at 103 m (338 ft) and with a circumference of 290 m (951 ft). The original stupa had been about 55 m (180 ft) in height and was renovated by many kings. The Kaunghmudaw Pagoda in Sagaing, Myanmar is modelled after this stupa The Mahavamsa contains a detailed account on the construction and the opening ceremony of the stupa.

The stupa was covered by wilderness as of the 19th century. After fund raising efforts by a bhikkhu, it was renovated in the early 20th century. The Ruwanweli Seya Restoration Society was set up in 1902. Most notably the philanthropist Hendrick Appuhamy donated Rs 20 million in 1912 (approximately 611 million USD adjusted for inflation in 2021) for restoration works. The modern day crowning (a "crown" is a large gem placed at the very top of the stupa) was done on June 17, 1940, and the final crowning of the stupa took place on November 26, 2019.

== Buddha’s Relic ==
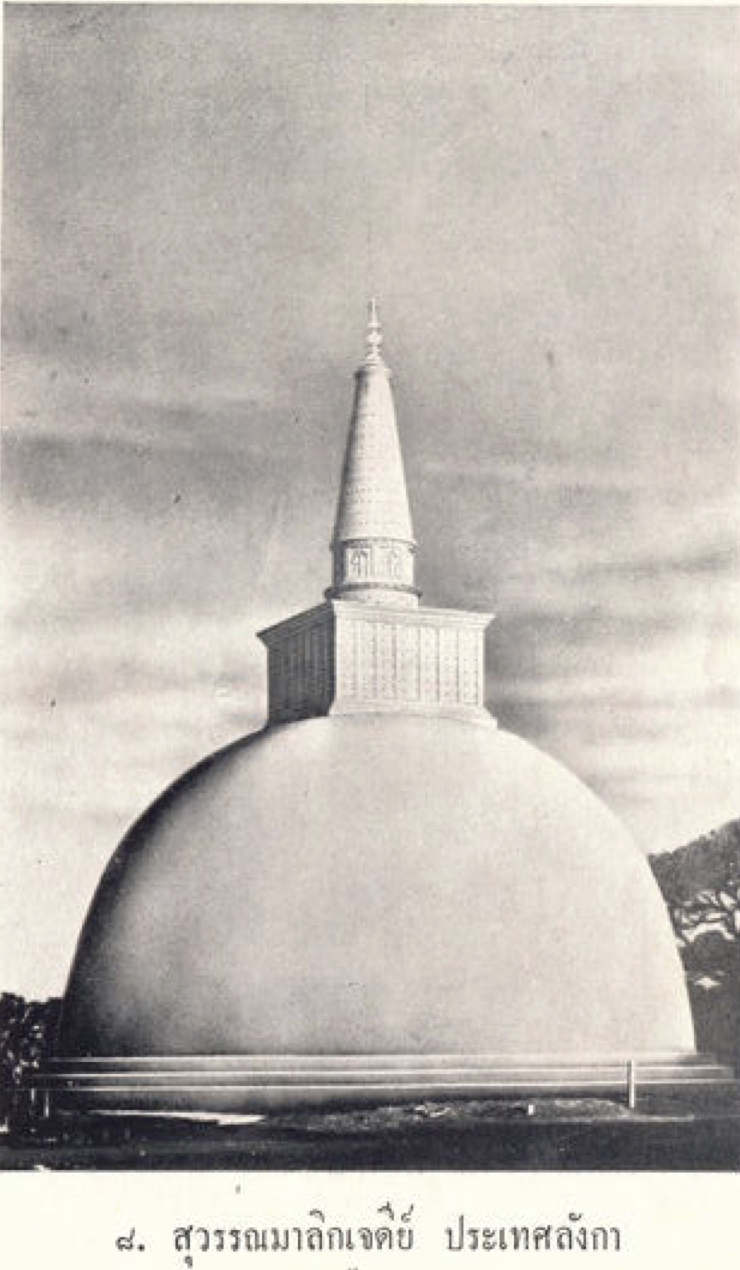
Ruwanwelisaya, circa 1950s

In the Mahavamsa, Ashoka of the Maurya dynasty chooses not to retrieve Buddha relics in the possession of Nagas at Ramagrama. It was said that on his deathbed, Buddha told a prophecy that of the eight donas of his body relics, one would be venerated by the Koliyas of Ramagrama, then the relics would belong to the Nagas until being enshrined in Sri Lanka. Ashoka is told more prophecy by arhats, who speak of the future enshrinement of these relics by king Dutthagamani.

King Dutthagamini then received from the Sangha the Buddha's relics upon his head in a casket and departed from the golden pavilion in the midst of manifold offerings and honours made by gods and ‘‘Brahmas’’. He circumambulated the relic-chamber three times, entered to it from the east, and when laid the relic-casket on a silver couch one ‘‘koṭi’’ worth, that was arranged in the north side. An image of the Buddha was then, according to the Buddha’s determination, created in the lion’s reclining posture (‘‘sīhaseyya’’), and all the relics were enshrined within that image. When the enshrining of the relics in the Great Stūpa Ruvanveli was completed, the two novices Uttara and Sumana closed the relic-chamber with the stone-blocks that were previously hidden to be used as a lid.

In the Thupavamsa numerous types of beings attended the enshrinement of the relics into the Mahathupa; including the Naga king Mahakala who until recently guarded them. The relics were to be placed atop a golden throne crafted by Visvakarman the divine artificer; the throne brought by Indra. Brahma offers his invisible umbrella of sovereignty, with the king Dutthagamani offering his own. The arhat Indagutta creates a metal canopy over the universe, so that Mara will not interfere, as monks chanted the Sutta Pitaka (the Collection of Discourses delivered by the Buddha). Dutthagamani ceremoniously enters with the urn atop his head; but as he is about to place the urn on the golden throne, the relics rise into the air and form Buddha, with each of the 32 major signs and 80 lesser signs of a great man. In this form he performs the twin miracle of fire and water, fulfilling the fifth of his death bed resolutions. One hundred and twenty million gods and humans gain arhatship from this experience. The relics return to the urn and they are laid to rest and the chamber sealed with forty meter stone slabs.

‘‘"The relic-chamber shall not shake even by an earthquake; flowers such as jasmine that were offered on that day shall not wither till the end of Buddha Gotama’s Dispensation; the lamps that were kindled with ghee-oil shall not be extinguished; the clay that was mixed with perfume and sandalwood shall not dry; even a single scratch shall not appear within the relic-chamber; stains shall not appear in any of the golden goods that were offered.’ All this occurred by the determination-power of all Arahants present. They determined also that inimical persons should not be able to even see the relic-chamber. Furthermore, by order of king Dutugemunu, the people of Srī Lanka enshrined, along with many other objects such as golden and silver caskets, thousand more of the Buddha's relics over the relic-chamber."

== History ==
King Dutugemunu started the construction of the stupa, however he died from an illness before it was finished. The construction began only after he conquered Rajarata from the Chola general Elāra.

The stupa was damaged during the Chola conquest of Anuradhapura, but was renovated during the reign of Parakramabahu I (1153–1187), who invaded South India, capturing few parts of Pandya Nadu. Parakramabahu used the captured Tamils for the work of renovation. Again it was invaded by Kalinga Magha with Tamil and Kerala Army who ransacked and destroyed it.

== Images ==
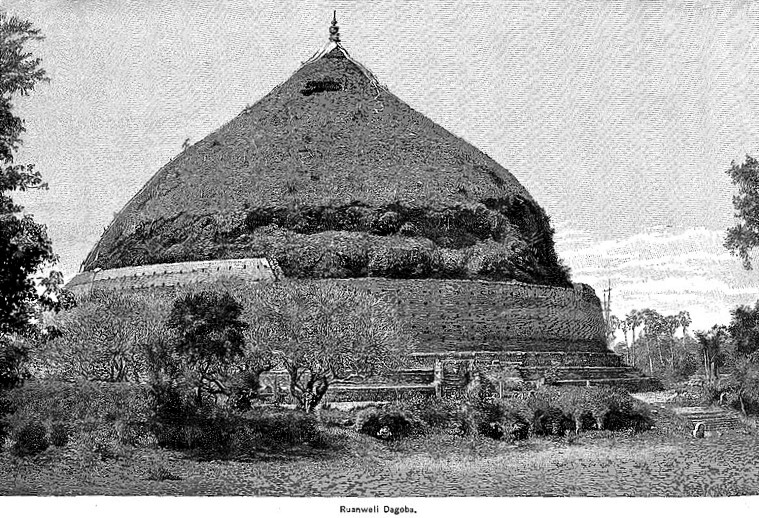
Ruwanwelisaya in 1891.

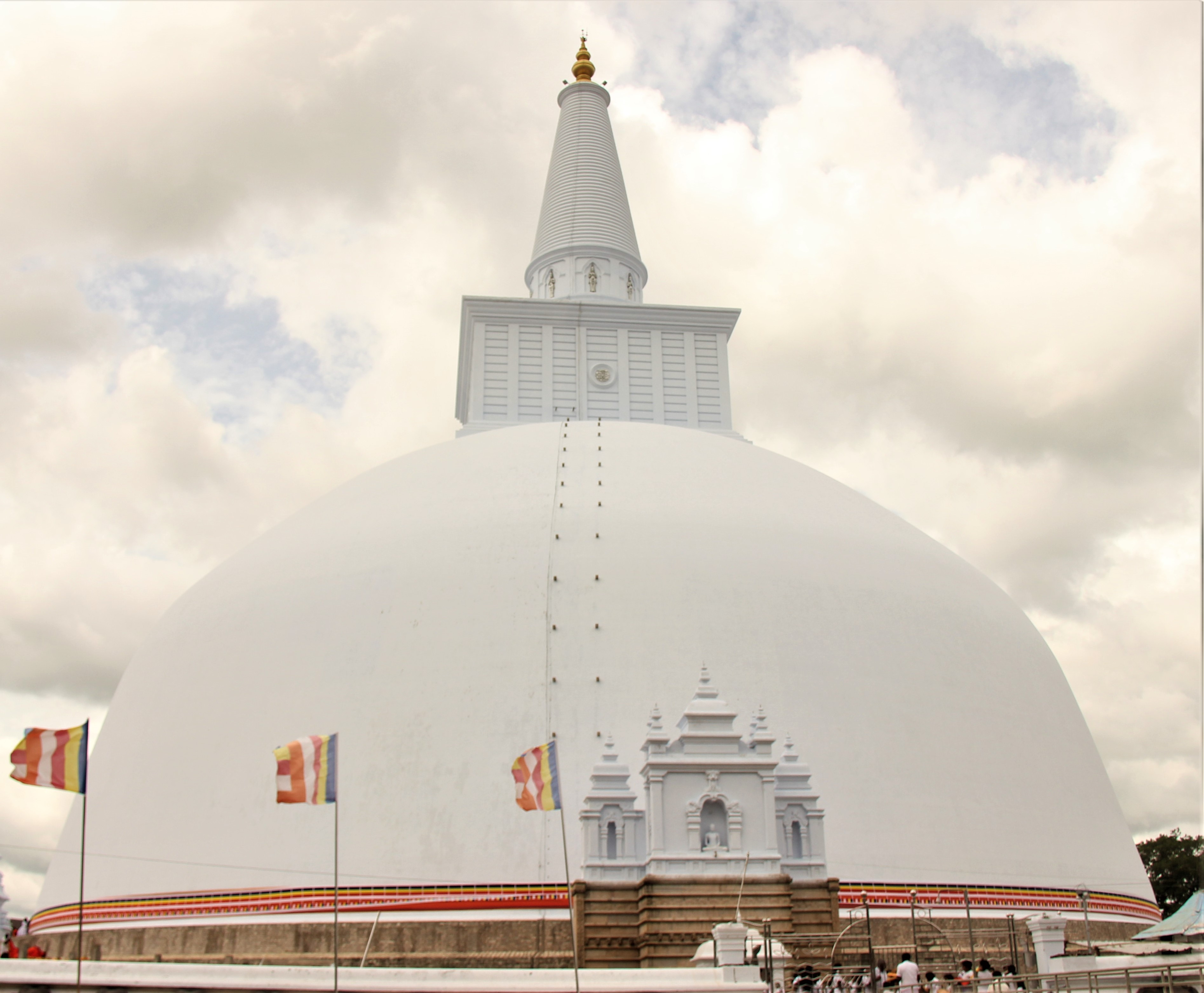
Ruwanwelisaya view from front.

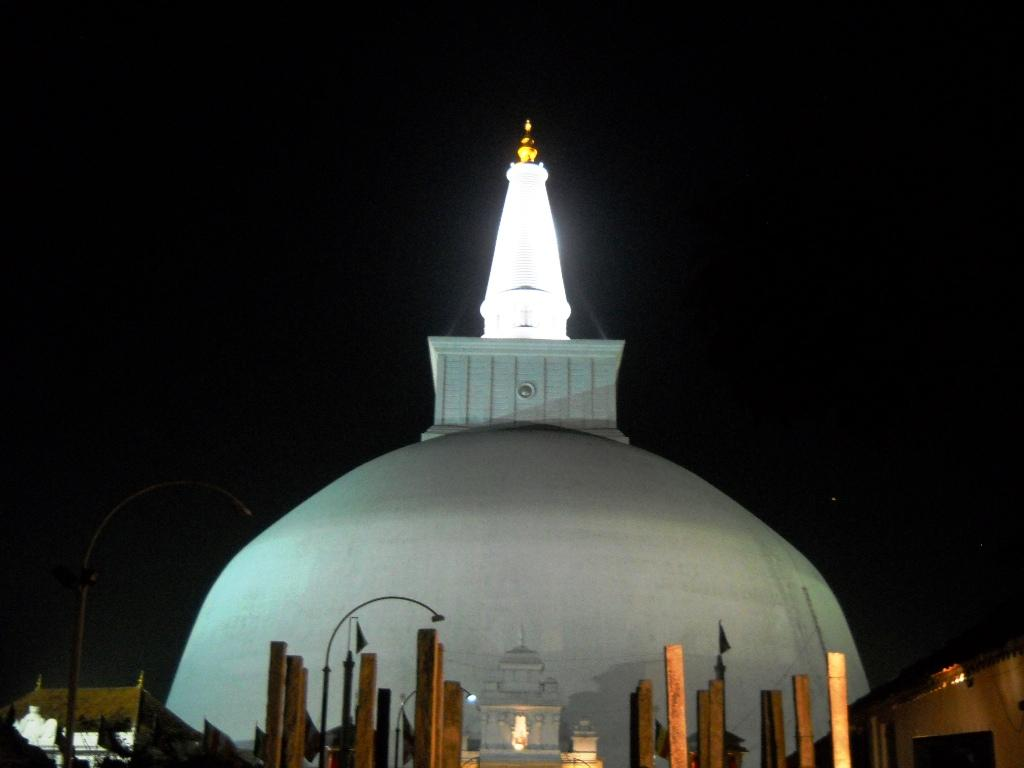
Ruwanwelisaya Stupa at night.

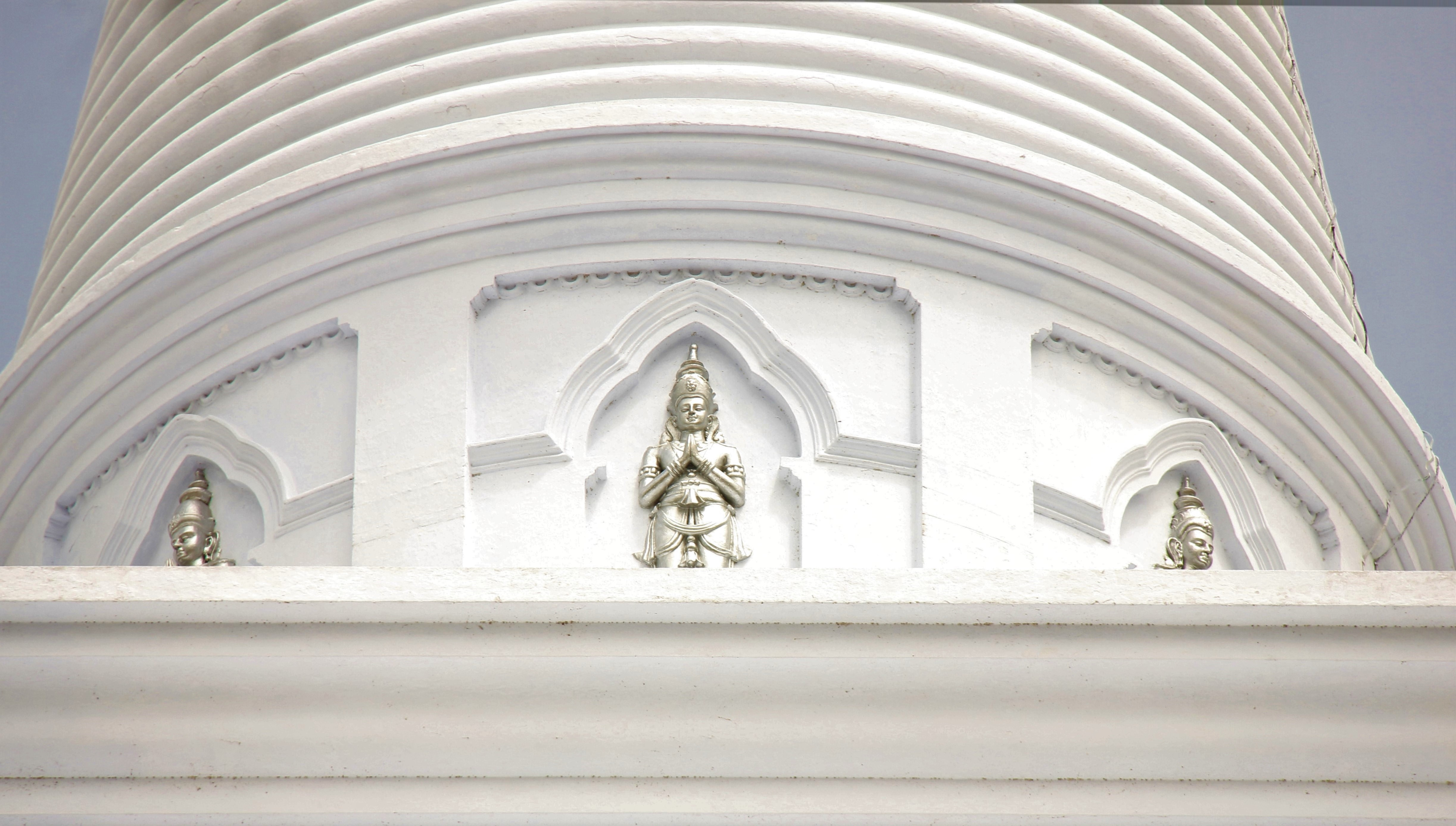
Close up view of top of Ruwanwelisaya stupa displaying sculptures.

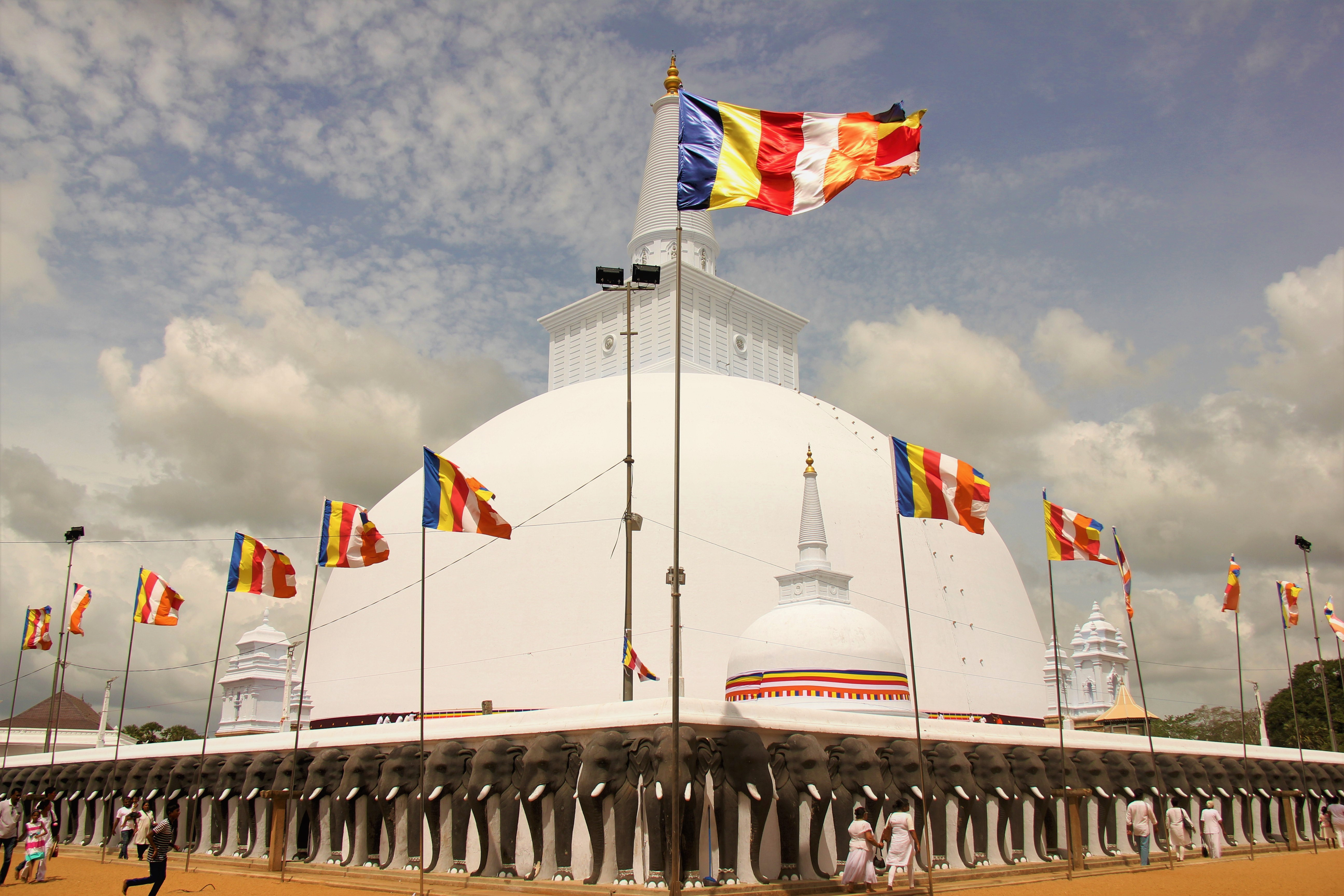

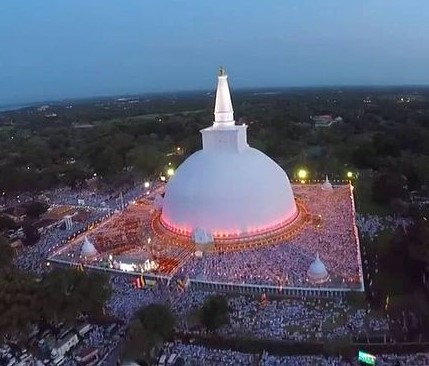
Aerial view.

== See also ==
- Ancient stupas of Sri Lanka
- List of tallest structures built before the 20th century
- Ancient Constructions of Sri Lanka
- Architecture of ancient Sri Lanka
- Architecture of Sri Lanka
- Jetavanaramaya
- Atamasthana
- Mahawansa
- Solosmasthana

== Bibliography ==
- Shereen Amendra, "Beyond the Seeing Eye: The Mahathupa of Lanka: An Insight", Shereen Amendra, 2006, ISBN 9555009805
- Ulrich von Schroeder, "Buddhist Sculptures of Sri Lanka", Visual Dharma Publications, 1990, ISBN 962-7049-05-0
- Strong, J.S. (2007), Relics of the Buddha, Princeton University Press, ISBN 978-0-691-11764-5
