= Reswehera =

Ancient Buddhist temple

Coordinates: 7°59′38″N 80°25′3″E

Reswehera Rajamaha Vihara is an ancient Buddhist temple located in Sri Lanka’s North Western Province. It is believed to have been built during the reign of King Devanampiya Tissa (307 BC – 267 BC), one of the earliest patrons of Buddhism on the island.

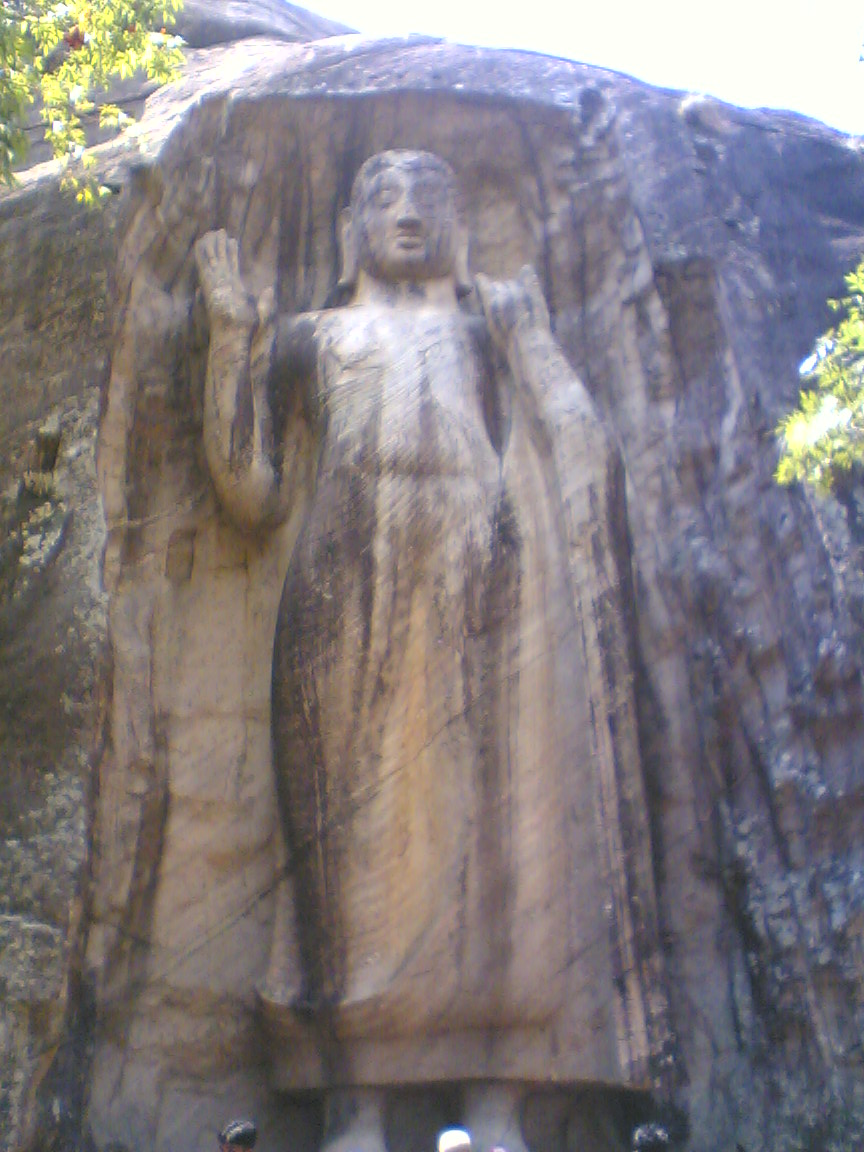
Gautama Buddha statue, built in the 4th Century AD

The temple is well known for its two Gautama Buddha statues, one carved in a rock and the other inside the vihara. In addition, the Bo tree which was planted from a branch of the sacred Jaya Sri Maha Bodhi illuminates the historical value of the place.
