= Jetavanaramaya =

- ජේතවනාරාමය
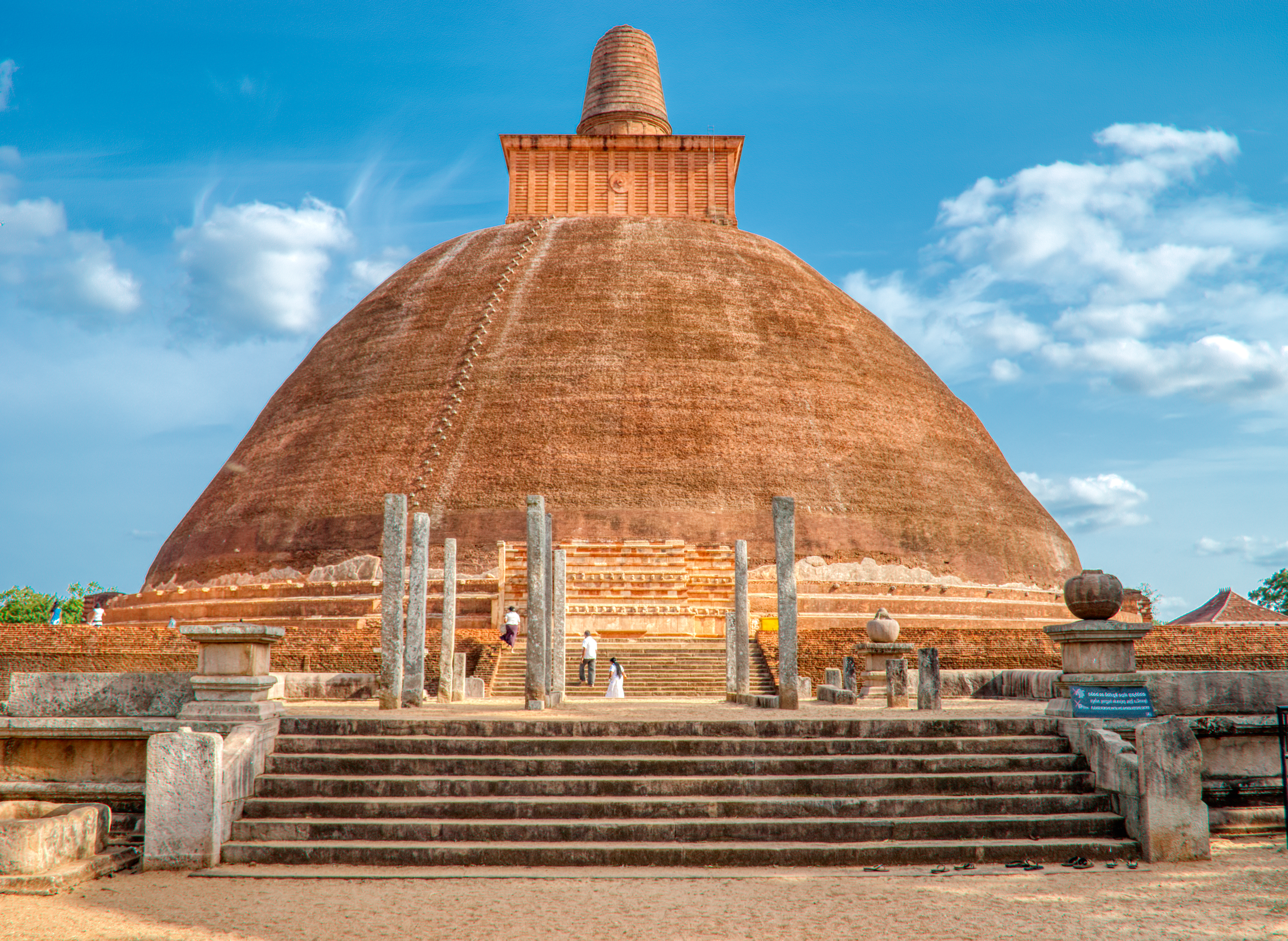
- Jetavanaramaya
- Former names: Denanaka and Denavehera

General information
- Type: Dagoba
- Architectural style: Sinhalese architecture
- Location: Anuradhapura, North Central Province, Sri Lanka

Height
- Height: Original height: 122 m (400 ft), Current height: 71 m (233 ft)

Dimensions
- Other dimensions: 233,000 m^{2} (2,508,000 ft^{2})

Technical details
- Floor area: 5.6 hectares

The Jetavanarama stupa or Jetavanaramaya (Sinhala: ජේතවනාරාමය, romanized: jētavanārāmaya), also sometimes referred to as the Jethawana or Jetavana stupa, is a stupa, or Buddhist reliquary monument, located in the ruins of Jetavana monastery in the UNESCO world heritage city of Anuradhapura, Sri Lanka. At 122 metres (400 ft), it was the world's tallest stupa, and the third tallest structure in the world (only behind the two great pyramids: Great Pyramid of Giza and Pyramid of Khafre) when it was built by King Mahasena of Anuradhapura (273–301). He initiated the construction of the stupa following the destruction of the Mahaviharaya of Anuradhapura. His son Kithsirimevan completed the construction of the stupa, and it was renovated by Parakramabahu I of Polonnaruwa.

According to later 13th century literary works, a part of Buddha's girdle is believed to be the relic that is enshrined here. A passage from the Rājaratnākara states that as Mahasena repaired temples he had destroyed, he was given the girdle of Buddha where it was deposited where a Budda had once sat. The account given by the Rājāvaliya states that there originally no relic, but Mahasena pleaded and was given one from heaven.

The structure is significant in the island's history as it represents the tensions within the Theravada and Mahayana sects of Buddhism; it is also significant in recorded history as one of the tallest structures in the ancient world; and the tallest non-pyramidal building; the height of the stupa was 122 metres (400 ft), making it the tallest stupa in the ancient world. With the destruction and abandonment of Anuradhapura kingdom in the 11th century, the stupa with others was covered by jungle. King Parakramabahu in the 12th century tried to renovate this stupa and it was rebuilt to the current height, a reduction from the original height. Today it stands at around 70 meters (varies from 71 to 70.7 meters).

The site covers approximately 5.6 hectares and is estimated to have housed 10,000 Buddhist monks. One side of the stupa is 176 m (576 ft) long, and the flights of stairs at each of the four sides of it are 9 m (28 ft) wide. The doorpost to the shrine, which is situated in the courtyard, is 8 m (27 ft) high. The stupa has a 8.5 m (28 ft) deep foundation, and sits on bedrock.

The structure is no longer the tallest, but it is still the largest, with a base-area of 233,000 m^{2} (2,508,000 ft^{2}). Approximately 456,071 cubic yards, or 93.3 million baked bricks were used in its construction; the engineering ingenuity behind the construction of the structure is a significant development in the history of the island.

== Conception and history ==
The establishment of the Buddhist monastery Jetavana and the central Jetavanaramaya stupa is chronicled in the Mahavamsa (The Great Chronicle of Ceylon). After Buddhism's introduction to Sri Lanka in the 3rd century B.C., it quickly expanded, in part, due to royal patronage. Building monasteries and commissioning Buddhist images became a primary duty of the king, where in turn the Buddhist order legitimized the kings rule, consequently linking national identity and religion in the reigon.

Theravāda Buddhism dominated the island and trace their history to Mahinda who introduced Buddhism to the island. The first monastery Māhāvihāra followed this tradition and was established in Anuradhpaura. Other Buddhist orders existed and continue to exist on the island, though the primary textual records of Buddhist history are by Theravadan monks. Mahayana Buddhism was introduced by Indian Buddhist monks in the first century B.C.

Schisms within the Māhāvihāra led to the creation of Abjayagiri vihara, which developed the Mahayana doctorine. By the fourth century, dissent between the Theravada and Mahayana schools of thought prompted the creation of Jetavanarama within the Mahavihara complex, as described below.

Following King Jettha Tissa's death, his brother Mahasena was consecrated as king by Mahayana monk Sanghamitra. Under the monk's influence King Mahasena brought about a campaign against Theravadins dwelling in the Mahavihara to confiscate the property. The differences between the Mahavihara and Abhayagiri fraternities escalated to an extent to which a penalty was established for any person providing alms to monks dwelling in the Mahavihara. The Mahavamsa quotes Sanghamitra: "The dwellers in the Mahavihara do not teach the (true) Vinaya, we are those who teach the (true) Vinaya, O king".

The Mahavihara was eventually abandoned. The monks dwelling at the premises moved to Malaya country and the Principality of Ruhuna, this was followed by the pillaging of Mahavihara by Sanghamitra and minister Sona, and all valuables were transferred to Abhayagiri vihāra.

The pillaging led to a rebellion by minister Meghavannabhaya, he raised an army from Malaya and set camp by the Duratissaka tank. King Mahasena marched an army to meet minister Meghavannabhaya and negotiations occurred the night before the battle. The king apologized for the pillaging and agreed to build a vihara on the grounds of Mahavihara. The Mahavamsa quotes the king: "We will make the vihara to be dwelt in yet again; forgive me my fault." Sanghamitra was assassinated by a labourer on the instructions of a wife of the king. Sangamitra's demise and the construction of parivena by minister Meghavannabhaya marked the return of monks to the site of Mahavihara.

Thus the construction of Jetavanaramaya began and was offered to the monk Tissa, but later the monk was accused of a grave offense upon investigation and proof by a minister, monk Tissa was eventually disrobed and expelled from the order. The Dakkhinagiri monks were then entrusted with the premises of Jetavana.

Jetavana became an important component of the Sagaliya sect. While authors such as H.W. Codrington and John Listopad suggest the Sagaliya sect was a succession from Theravada, Hema Ratnayake, project director for Jetavanaramaya for the Sri Lankan led Cultural Triangle project, states that the sect belonged to the Theravada tradition. He further explains that the formation was a result of a difference in interpretation. Similarly, RHIS Ranasighe, professor at the Sri Lankan University of Kelaniya, asserts the basic doctorine of Theravada and Mahayana Buddhism is the same, with only minor doctrinal differences separating them. Steven E.G. Kemper argues that Jetavana shifted between the two schools. Tension between the two schools of thought had existed in Buddhism prior to the religions introduction to the island. Doctrinal strain in the Anuradhapura period of Sri Lanka was rampant among all four main sects, including Mahavihara, Abhayagiri, Jetavana, and Vaitulyavada.

=== Late history ===
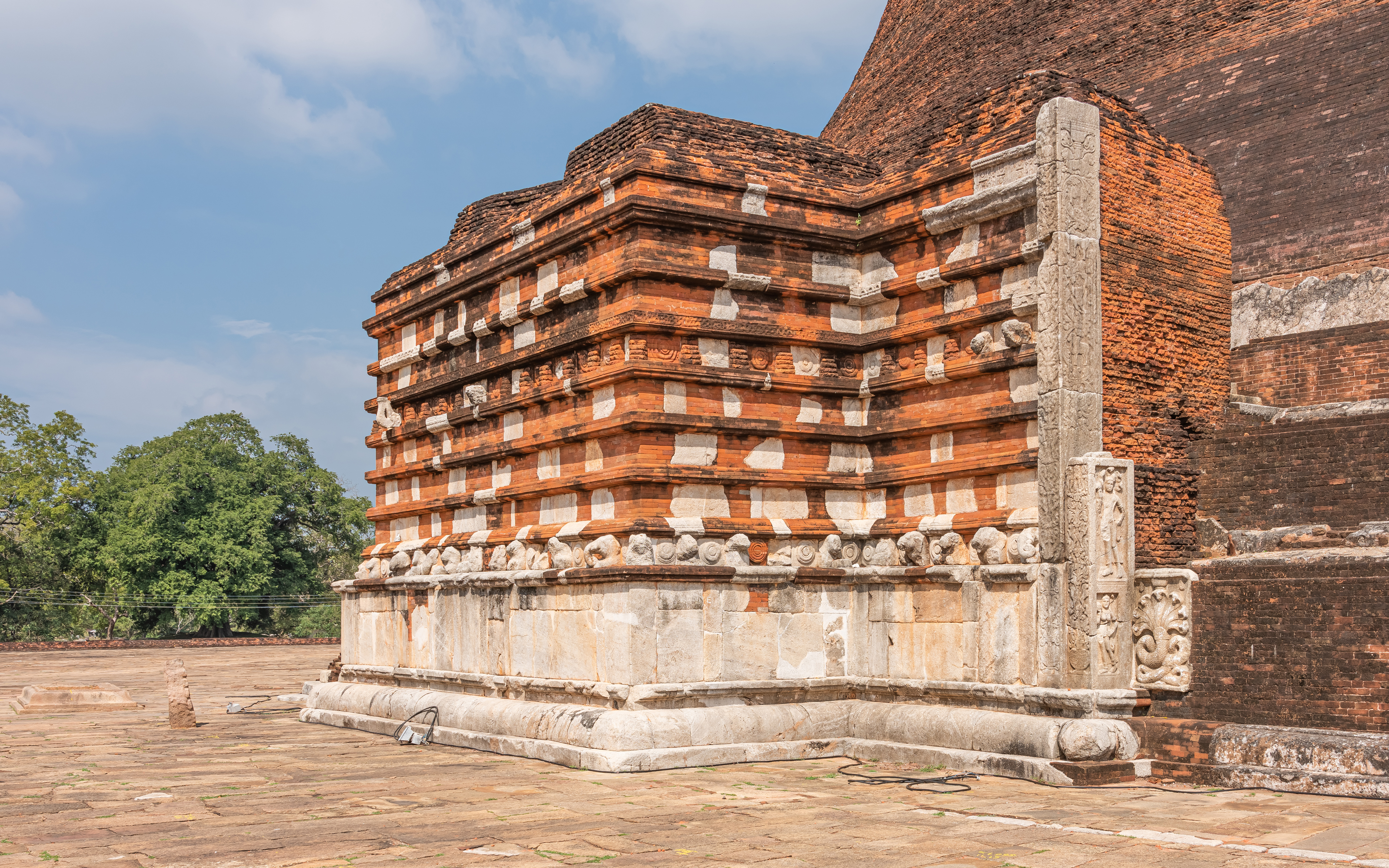
Carvings at Jetavanaramaya

After creation by Mahasena, subsequent kings frequently renovated the stupa. King Mittasena (275-301 AD) created a gateway through the elephant wall. According to the Culawamsa, later king Dhatusena (416-478 AD) had renovated Jetavanaramaya alongside other viharas with stucco work, gilding, embedding of precious gems, and a protective structure against lightning. While the exact design and mechanism for the lightning protection structure (known as a Vajrachumbata) is unknown, the lack of evidence for lightning strikes on Sri Lankan stupas, suggests their effectiveness.

King Aggabodhi (571-604 AD) added a jeweled umbrella. Maggallana III (614-619 AD) began repairs that were continued into the 10th century. Parakkamabahu the first restored the stupa to 210 feet. The Mahavihara, Abhhyagirya, and Jetavana fraternities were united during the reign of King Parakramabahu I (1153-1186), who carried out reforms that abolished the Jetavana and Abhyagiriya fraternities and derobed the monks belonging to them as well as some Mahavihara adherents.

While repairs on the stupa were considered charitable, a 10th century inscription records an agreement designating that local peoples give their shares of rice in exchange for the repair.

Conflicts between Buddhist sects impacted Jetavanarama. In the mid 2nd century AD, the Dhammaruci sect overran Jetavanarama. The stupa was then plundered by Dathopatissa I (639-650 AD).

== Name and location ==
Originally known as the Nandana Pleasure Grove (3rd century B.C.), likely named after the garden in Indra's paradise, Jetavanaramaya was an important location to Buddhism's history in Sri Lanka. Thera Mahinda, the son of Emperor Asoka, brought Buddhism to Sri Lanka. He took up residence at the grove to preach Buddhist principles (dharma) for seven days to 7,000 people. Stone implements, brick layers, and post holes found on the site corroborate the existence of some sort of settlement before the arrival of Buddhism. After, the area was named Joitavana. Jetavana was derived from this previous name.

== Design and construction ==
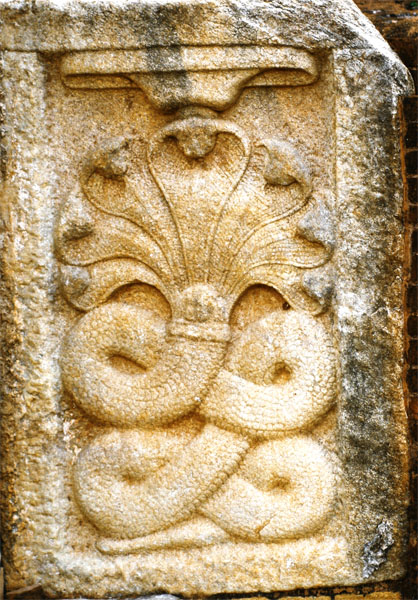
Carving of a seven-headed Nāga at the Jetavanaramaya

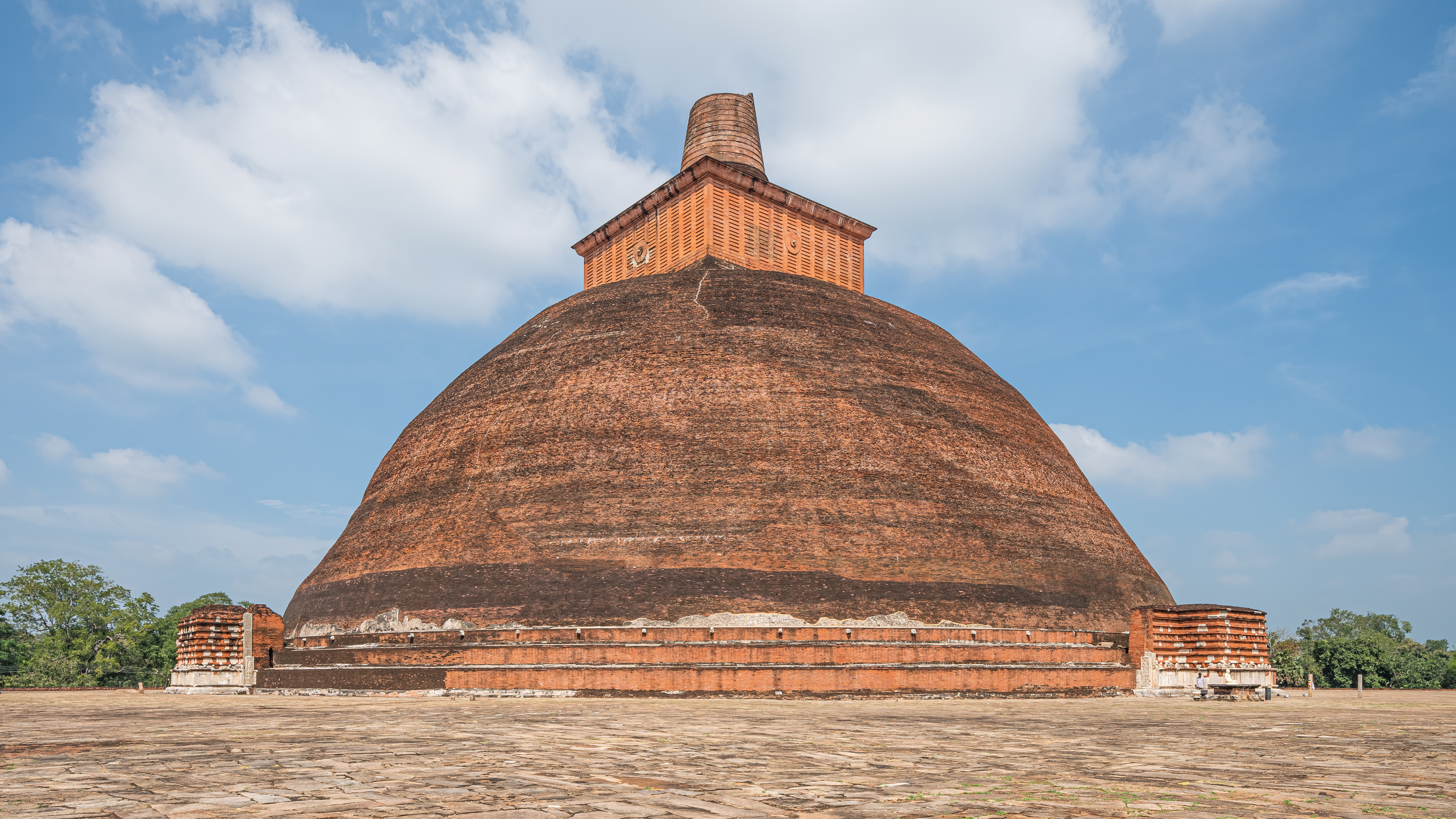
Jetavanarama Stupa

As one of the largest ancient stupas constructed and one of the tallest ancient structures in the world, the structural ingenuity and engineering skills employed for the construction are significant. The structure is not hollow, rather it is a solid form. The foundations of the structure were 8.5m deep and the size of the structure required bricks which could withstand loads of up to 166 kg. The solid foundation lay on bedrock and the dome was constructed of full and half bricks and earth fill, the unique shape of a perfect ellipsoid, also frequently described as a paddy-heap-shape, allowed for stress and thus allowed the construction of the large structure. Investigations by Munidasa P Ranaweera in 2018, subjected the stupa to a mild earthquake while recording a time history analysis. The results suggest that previous seismic damage may have contributed to some of the damage at the top of the stupa. Sri Lanka is considered aseismic, but earthquakes and moderate seismic activity still impact the island.

The Mahavamsa describes the foundation laying, where fissures were filled with stones and stamped down by elephants whose feet were protected with leather bindings. The bricks used for the construction were a significant development of ancient Sri Lankan engineering, the bricks used for Jetavanaramaya had a composition of 60 percent fine sand and 35 percent clay, the bricks could withstand 44 kg/cm^{2} (281 kg/in^{2}).

Finely crushed dolomite, limestone, sieved sand and clay provided the bonding material for the bricks. The clay employed was pliable and thus accommodates movement within the structure. Compositional analysis of bricks showed a far greater percentage of sand in ancient bricks from the Jetavana stupa compared to modern ones, perhaps contributing to their strength. One of the sides of the brick was roughened to trap the bonding slurry thus limiting lateral movement. The stupa was then covered with multiple layers of lime plaster; the plaster used contained seashells, sugar syrup, egg whites, coconut water, glues, oils, plant resin, sand, clay and pebbles. Scientific analysis revealed that calcium lime from seashells was the primary binder for the aggregate of sand. The addition of organic plant materials and varying ratios of binders suggest that ancient builders customized materials for specific purposes. The plaster also provided waterproofing for the structure. As a result, despite the harsh climate, the stupa's lime plaster is well preserved.The Mahavamsa also mentions the use of copper sheets over the foundation and arsenic dissolved in sesame oil to prevent insect and plant intrusions inside the stupa.

Ornamental stonework and sculpture can be observed across the structure at various stele, including floral, animal, figural, and geometric motifs.

A stone path totaling 576 square feet surrounded the stupa. It was used to traverse the area and to hold religious rites. The stones closest to the stupa contain geometric symbols, though their exact significance is debated. The further stones contain inscriptions by people of all social classes, including women. The inscriptions primarily contain transitional Brahmi characters, although Tamil and Pallava characters have also been identified. In addition to in-situ inscriptions, donation records for other Anuradhapura stupas shows that the building of these paths were funded by individuals. However, the path was likely not completed at Jetavanaramaya, possibly due to the abandonment of Anuradhapura in the early eleventh century. A 50ft. wide procession path covered with sand surrounds the paved platforms on all sides.

It is estimated that Jetavanaramaya took 15 years to complete and would have required a skillful workforce of hundreds, including brickyard workers and bricklayers, and stonemasons.

== Conservation ==
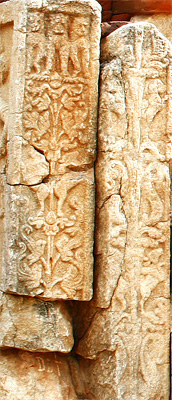
Carvings at Jetavanaramya

Until 1909, the colossal structure was covered with shrub jungle. Brick debris covered large sections of the structure. Monk Kumbuke Dhammarama of Sailabimbaramaya temple of Gammanpita received approval to clear the stupa. The approval was, however, cancelled as the monk decided to settle down. Polonnaruwa Sobita sought and received permission to continue clearing the premises but approval was once again cancelled when the monk initiated the collection of contributions. However, the monk refused to leave.

A British restoration attempt at the Miriseveti stupa in 1979 which laid new bricks made with modern materials, caused extra stress on the ancient brickwork and ultimately broke the dome into multiple segments. For the later 1981 Jetavanaramaya project by the Central Cultural Fund, a conservationist approach, with minimal intervention, was implemented. The treatment consisted of cleaning vegetation, the addition of special made bricks similar to their ancient counterparts, and minimal reinforcement measures.

Conservation in the late 1990s was funded by the income from ticket sales, mainly to foreign tourists to the three cultural triangle sites of Anuradhapura, Polonnaruwa and Sigiriya.The surface of the dome was cleaned and reinforced with bricks. Bricks were burned using the same kind of mixture that was used by the builders of the original dagoba. There has however been a decline of the city due to the significant war that existed in the late 1990s. A brick shortage has slowed down the restoration efforts.

As of 2003, a majority of the dome has been restored, as well as partial work on the outer walls and entrance gateways. Progress on the rest of the stupa since then remains unclear.

Geographical Information System (GIS) mapping combined with hand drawn plans by the Anuradhapura Digital Mapping Project document the stupa plan before and after conservation. A Digital Elevation Model (DEM) was used to create a 3D model of the stupa. These digital maps also show distribution of vegetation and inscriptions at the site.

== Surveys and Excavations ==
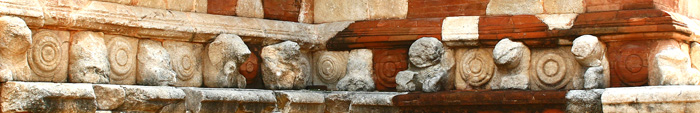
Carvings and details at the Jetavanaramaya

At the end of 1873, cleaning at Jetavanarama had only recently begun following similar work at Abhayagiri. By the 1884-85, the jungle south of the stupa was burned, beginning to expose some of the structure. The following year, the northern chapel of the stupa, which had been covered in debris, was explored, revealing several antique heads and a marble casket inscribed with the Sinhalese form of an Aṣóka character.

From 1890 to 1914, H.C.P. Bell surveyed Anuradhapura and noted details about Jetavanamara. In 1890, he speculated on the identity of the elephant stables near the monastery complex. The jungle and path from Jetavanarama were still being cleared in 1892. In 1905 he noted significant foliage still covered the stupa. W.W. Wheeler noted the stupa in 1913, where he discussed the Buddhist priests practicing in a small temple nearby the stupa with a Bo-tree rather than the abandoned Jetavanarama.

Richard Fry, along with the Royal Society for Asian Affairs, toured the Anuradhapura region and noted the Jetavanamara stupa in 1975. However, an expansive excavation focusing specifically on the stupa did not occur until 1984 by the Central Cultural Fund.

=== Artifacts ===
Excavations have revealed artifacts indicating that Sri Lanka was the primary entrepot for trade activity connecting the Indian rim countries as well as the Mediterranean and the Far East, and artistic influences that point to a shared culture in South Asia.

Imported materials, including glass fragments, and traces of lapis lazuli discovered in 1993 on a painted frontispiece slab, found at Jetavanaramaya point to trade. Glass was exclusively imported in early Medieval Sri Lanka. Similarly, lapis was only sourced from Badakhshan at the time, and its trade was mentioned in the Periplus. Conch shell and ivories were also found.

Coins were found at Jetavanarama, including a coin of Kanishka II, Viradaman of Western Ksatrapas, Piroz II, Shapur II, and Roman emperor Trajan.

A Ganhdara Buddha statue was reportedly excavated from Jetavanarama, though an official report remains unpublished.

Mesopotamian Torpedo jars, Late Roman bronze coins, and Tang dynasty and Five dynasty Period Chinese pottery shards excavated at the neighboring city of Anuradhpaura similarly suggest rich trade activity in the region.

=== The Jetavana Treasure ===
During excavations investigating the engineering and architectural technologies employed in the stupas construction, a large collection of local and foreign artifacts were discovered in a clay layer between the base and brick platform, and the northern and eastern vahalkada's. The artifacts were stylistically dated between 300 BCE and 200 AD.

These artifacts from across Indian, China, Islamic cultures and the West were all found at Jetavanaramaya. Various categories of pottery sherds, including Red Polished Ware, Red Slipped Pinkish-Buffed Ware, and Rouletted Ware suggest imports from India. Pottery fragments identified Chinese and Islamic presence, while Roman figures carved into seals identified connection to the west.

Thousands of beads made of various materials, including precious stones, ivory, gold and bronze were found at the stupa. The number specifically from the Jetavana treasure is unclear, as reports range from 300,000 to one million.

Blank and carved seals were discovered at the stupa made of both Carnelian and bone. Carnelian seals were also found at Kataragama, indicating the seal carving practice in the region. Carnelian was imported from North India and Afghanistan. A carved carnelian intaglio with a 3-4 letter inscription of a Buddhist motto was found, termed the Jetavana intaglio. Similar inscriptions have been found in Southern Cambodia and Thailand.

Bronze artifacts similarly span cultures, though they are dated to the 11th-13th century AD than the aforementioned finds. Of note are the Hindu bronzes that are speculated by Hema Ratnayake, head archeologist of the Jetavanaramaya Project, to represent deities as a tool for meditation. Represented dieties include Siva, Bodhistava, and Pattini.

Artifacts found corroborate the gold-plating technique practiced in Sri Lanka from the 3rd century AD. Notable among these finds were several gold plates found in the south-west quadrant in 1982. While incomplete, these sheets contain inscriptions from the Mahayana text Prajnaparamita Sutra, written in both Sinhala script with archaic letters.

== See also ==
- Ancient stupas of Sri Lanka
- List of tallest structures built before the 20th century
- Architecture of ancient Sri Lanka
- Ruwanwelisaya
