= Naka Vihara =

Stupa in Anuradhapura, Sri Lanka

Naka Vihara (Sinhalaː නඛා වෙහෙර) is a dagoba belonging to the late Anuradhapura period, between the 7th and 10th centuries C.E. and located in Anuradhapura, Sri Lanka. The dagoba was built from bricks and is square in shape. The site was constructed according to an unusual model and would have been similar to the seven-story building Satmahal Prasadaya in Polonnaruwa, Sri Lanka. Excavations done at this location revealed several clay caskets.
