= Rathna Prasadaya =

Rathna Prasadaya was a tower built by King Kanittha Tissa who ruled ancient Sri Lanka from 167 to 186 AD. Mihindu II and Mihindu IV renovated the building during the 8th and 10th centuries. The bhikkhus of the Tapovana belonging to the Pansakulika sect resided here. Exquisite guardstones of the Abhayagiri Viharaya are found here, including the finest and most perfectly preserved guardstone from the Anuradhapura era.
