= Kiribath Vehera =

Kiribath Vehera is situated in the ancient sacred city of Anuradhapura, Sri Lanka. The remains of this vihara shows that it is 9 metres (30 ft) in height and the circumference is 132.5 metres (435 ft). The date of construction and the king who built it, is unknown. Nearby, are the ruins of an image house. There is controversy whether the Pattamaka Chetiya built by King Devanampiyatissa is one and the same.
