= Maha Bo Vannama =

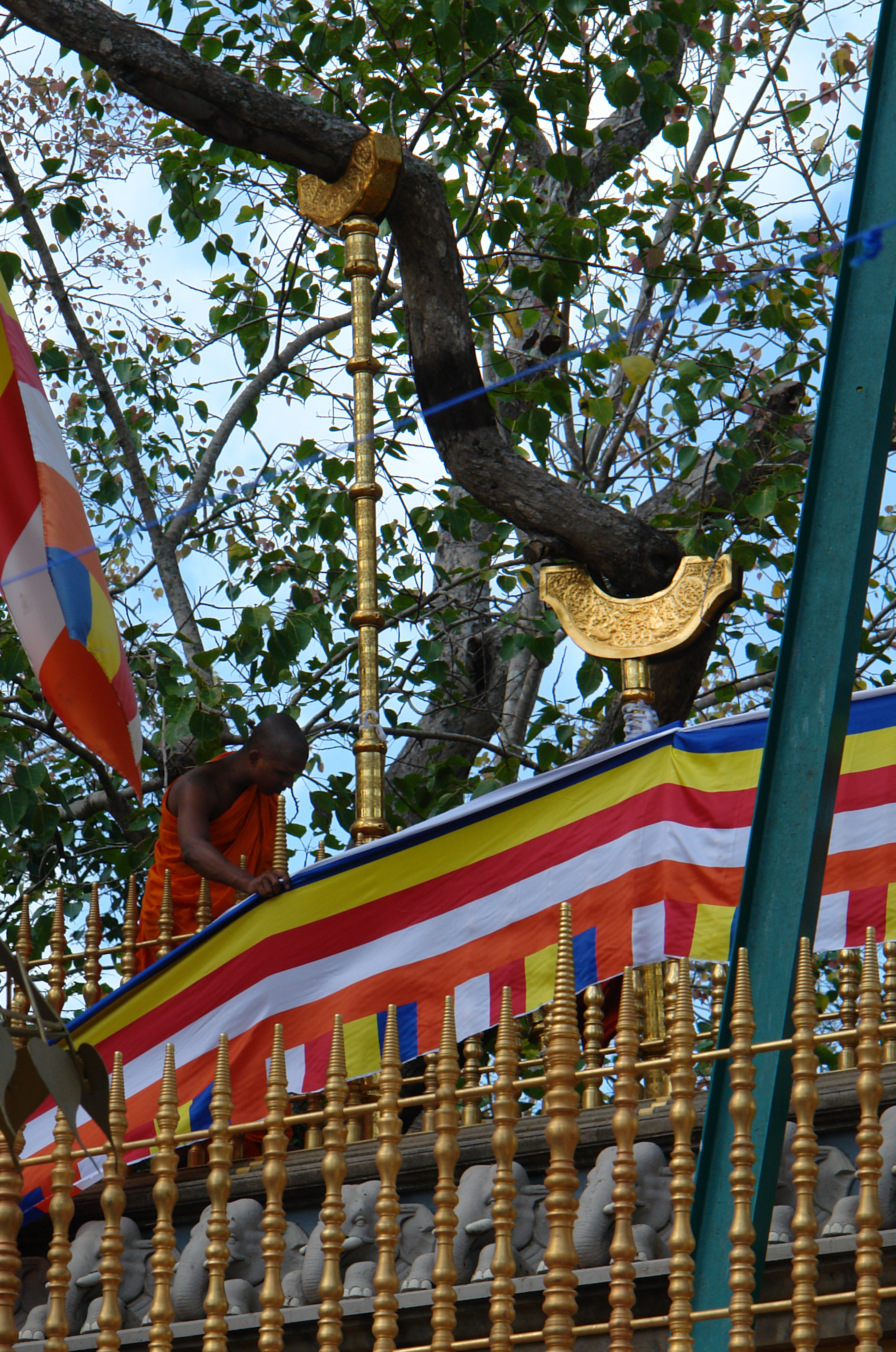
Jaya Sri Maha Bodhi

Maha Bo Vannama is a song composed by Chandraratne Manawasinghe and W.D. Amaradeva to the Daha Ata Vannama (Sinhala: දහඅට වන්නම). It was written as a dedication to the Jaya Sri Maha Bodhi, the sacred fig tree in the Mahamevnāwa Gardens, Anuradhapura. A dance recital was created and performed for the Vannama by the duo of Niththawela Gunaya and Heen Baba Dharmasiri.

== See also ==
- W.D. Amaradeva
- Chandraratne Manawasinghe
