= Ranmasu Uyana =

Park in Sri Lanka

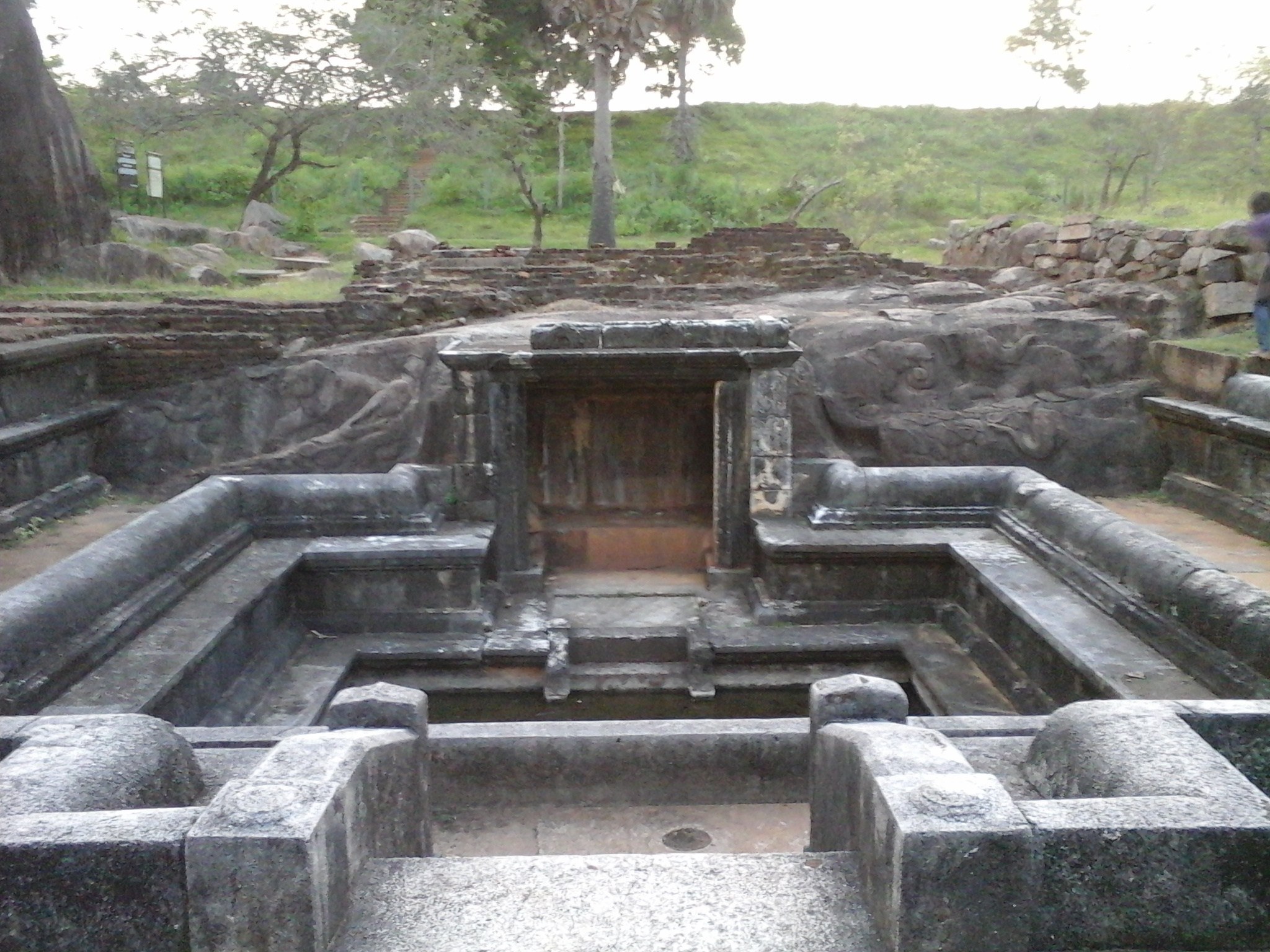
A pond at Ranmasu Uyana

Ranmasu Uyana is a park in Sri Lanka containing the ancient Magul Uyana (Royal Gardens). It is situated close to Isurumuni Vihara and Tissa Wewa in the ancient sacred city of Anuradhapura, Sri Lanka. It sits on approximately 40 acres (16 ha), and is a noted example of Sri Lankan garden architecture of the pre-Christian era. According to an inscription found in Vessagiriya, the water to the park was supplied by Tessa Wewa and then released to rice fields around Isurumuni Vihara.

In the park are various ponds, and the remains of small buildings. According to legend it is believed that Prince Saliya met Asokamala in this garden.

Ranmasu means Goldfish. The Royal Goldfish Park has the Star Gate map which is encircled by fish.

== History ==
Royal gardens were first constructed here in the time of King Tissa (3rd century BC), when the reservoir was built. However, the pleasure pavilions and other fixtures seen today date from the 8th-9th centuries AD.

== Popular culture ==
Claims have been published on the internet and television documentaries that a carving within the park known as Sakwala Chakraya was an interface or stargate "between humans and some intelligent species from outer space". Such claims have been called "absurd" by archeologists, who suggest the carving could simply be an early world map.

== Gallery ==
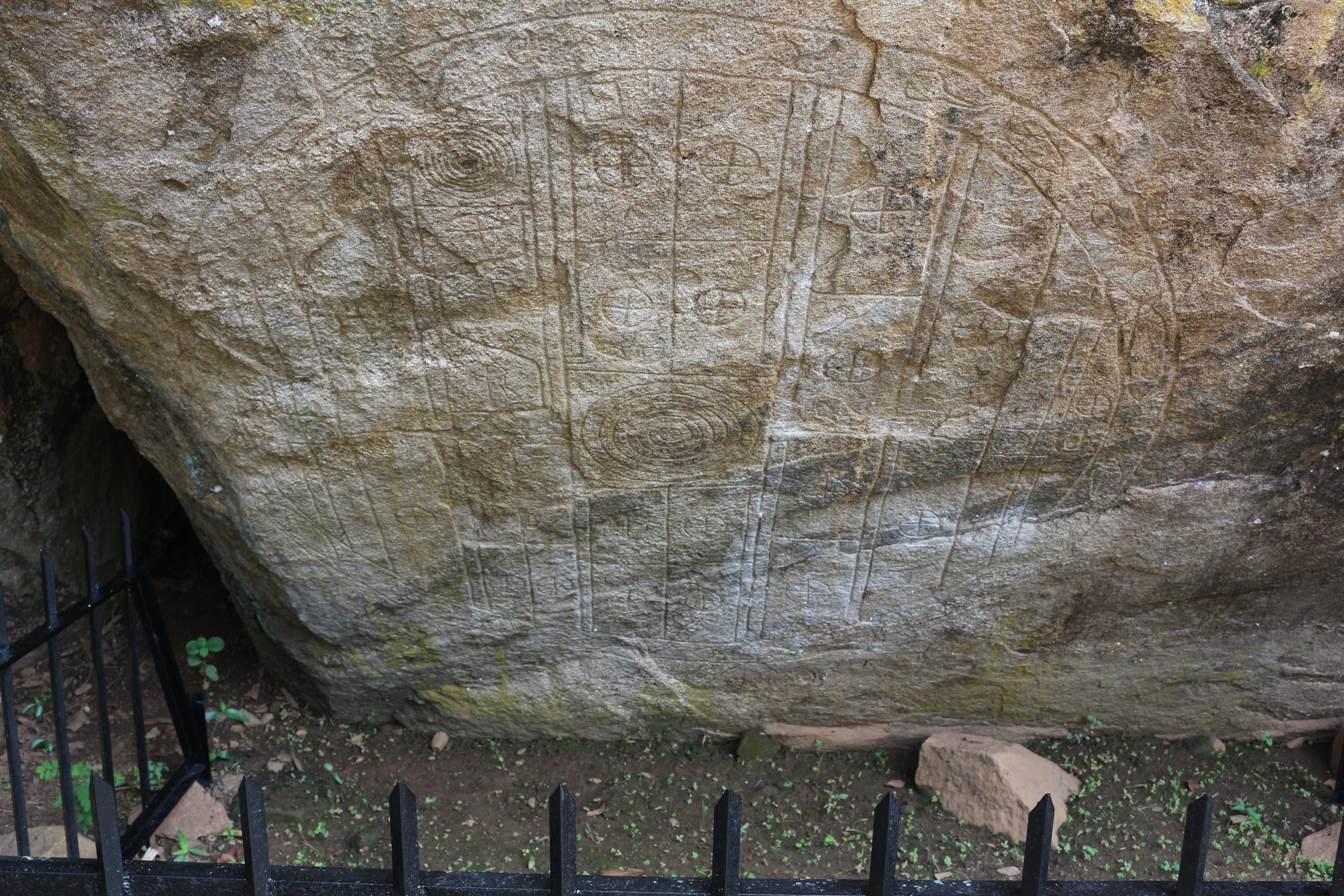
Star Gate Situated in Ranmasu Uyana

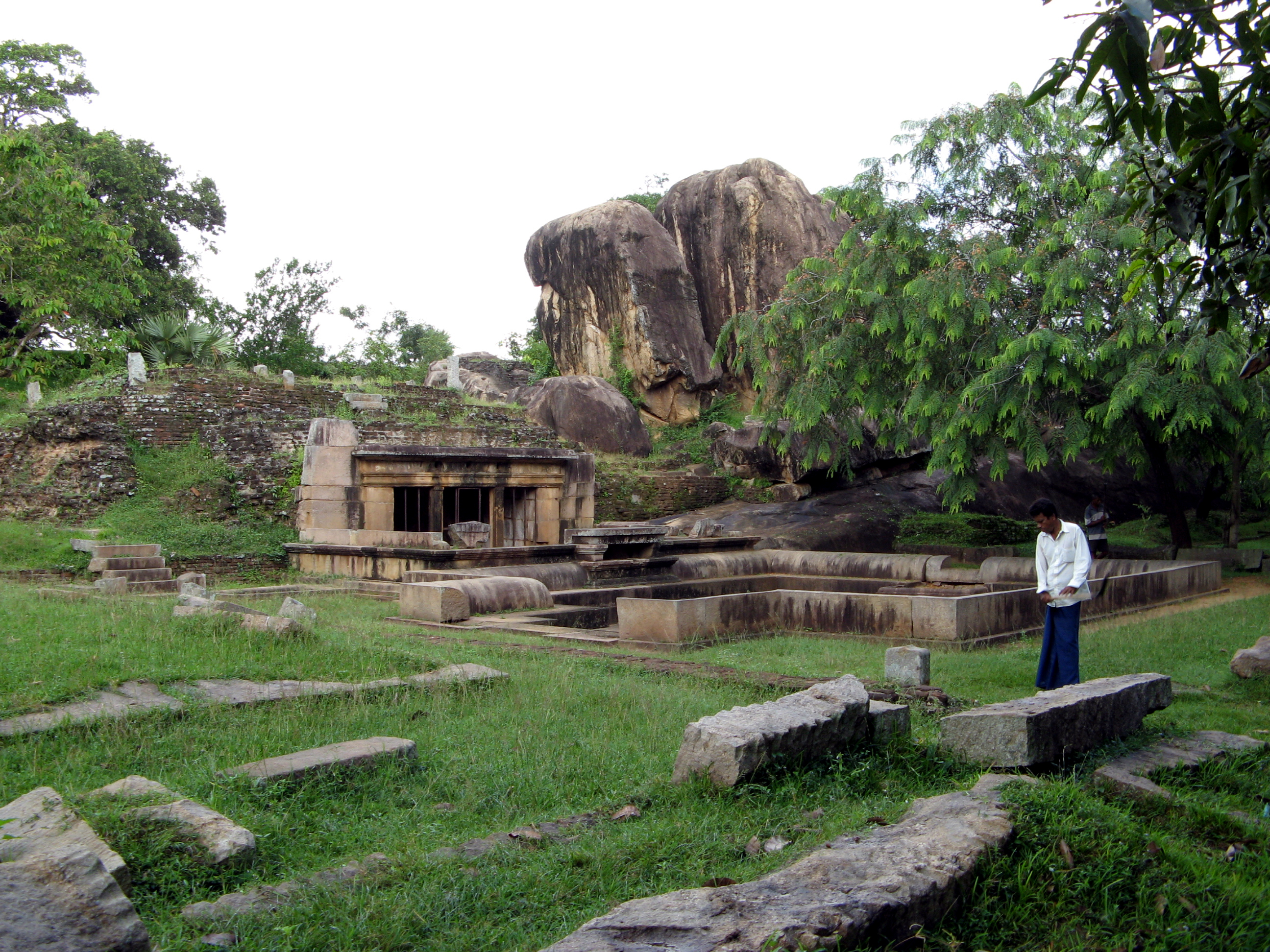
Royal gardens from the 8th-9th centuries AD

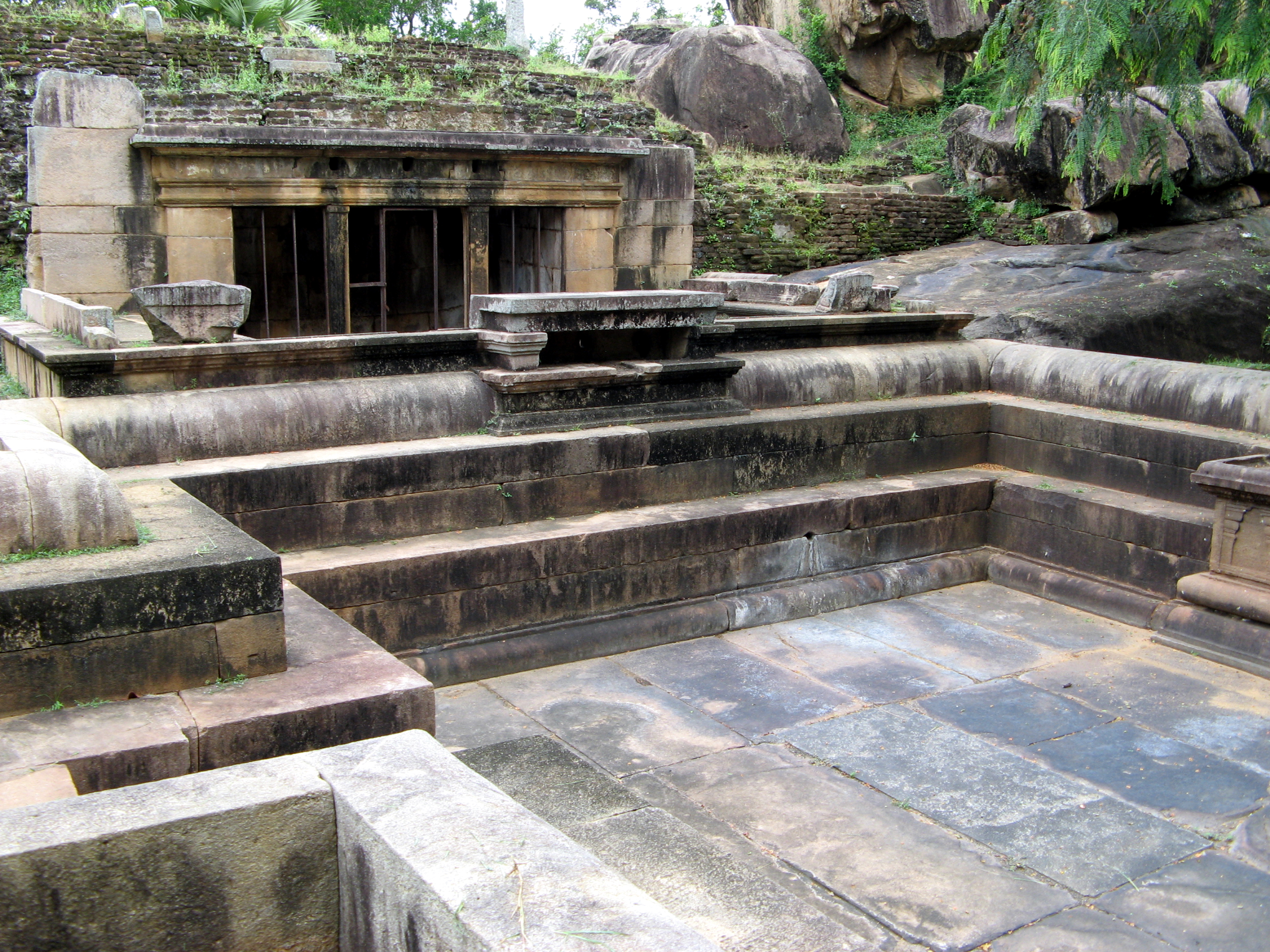
Closeup of the pavilion and tank

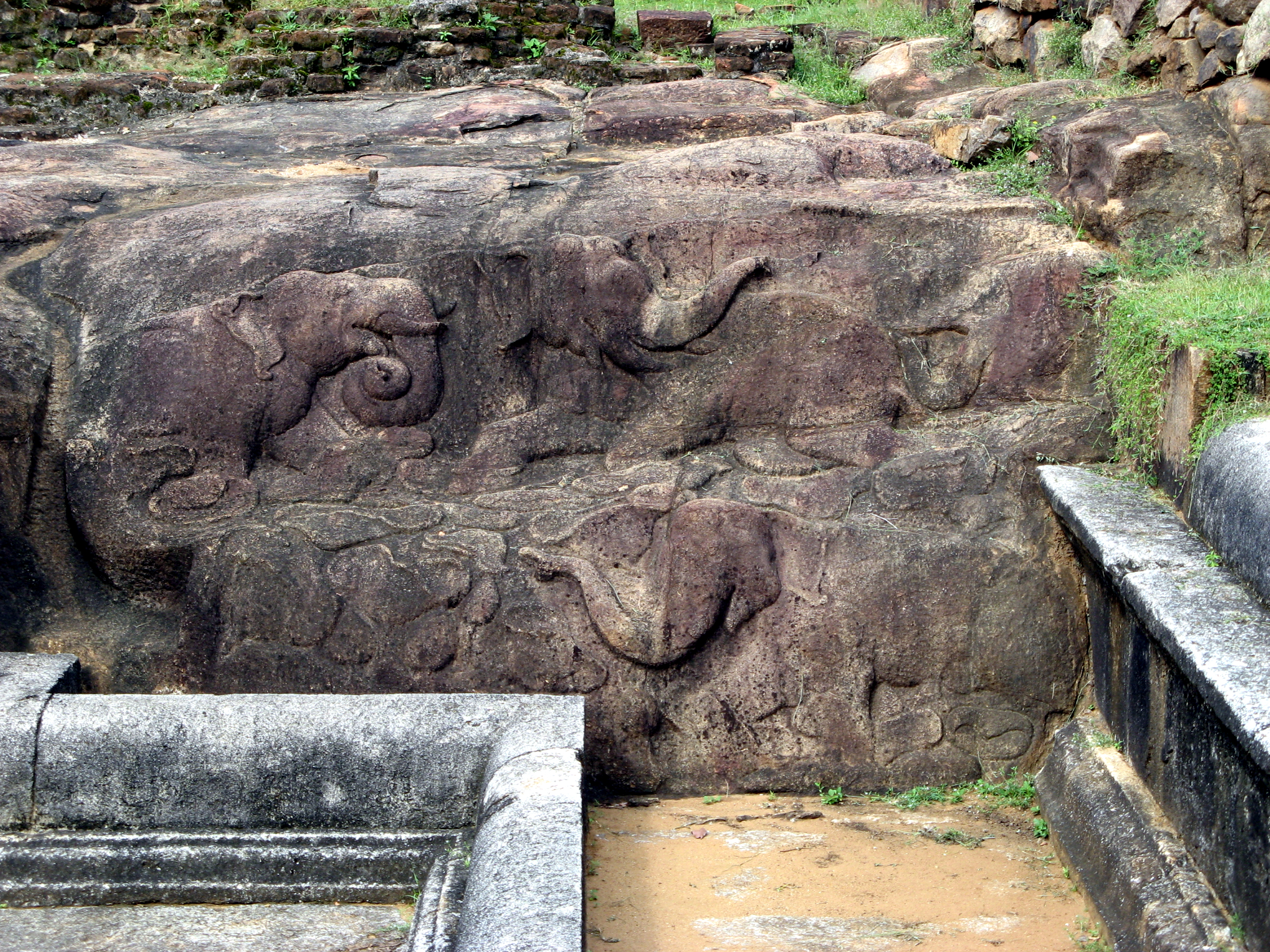
Frieze of elephants

== See also ==
- History of Sri Lanka
- Ancient Constructions of Sri Lanka
