= Toluvila statue =

Statue in Sri Lanka

Toluvila Buddha statue
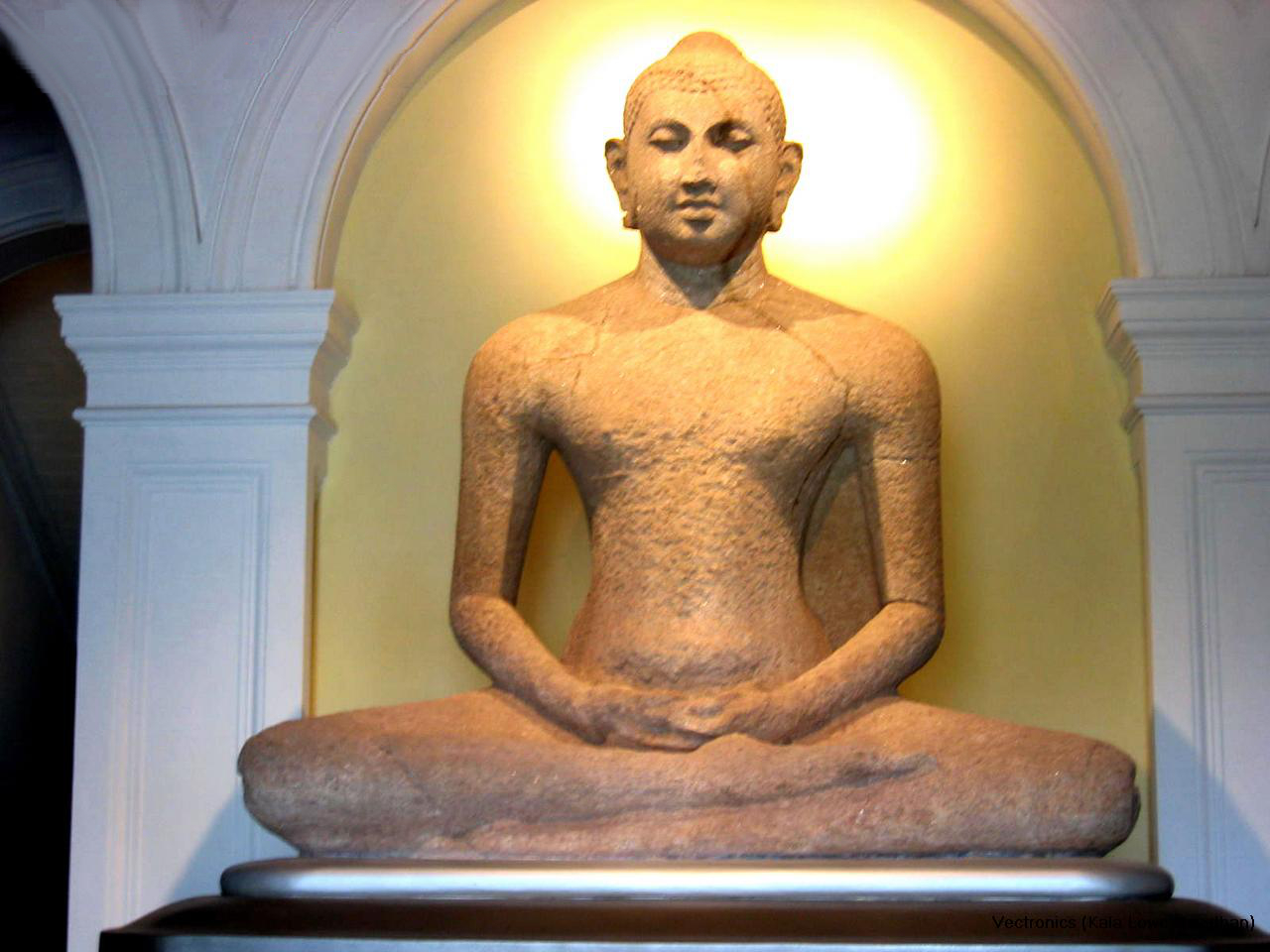
- Year: 4th–5th century
- Type: Stone sculpture
- Location: Anuradhapura

The Toluvila statue is a seated image of the Buddha discovered in 1900 in Anuradhapura, Sri Lanka, that dates back to the 4th or 5th century. Carved out of granite, it is one of the best-preserved sculptures from Sri Lanka and is similar to the Samadhi statue of Anuradhapura. Some features of the statue indicate that it may have been influenced by the Mathura School. The statue is now kept at the National Museum of Colombo.

== Appearance and characteristics ==
The Toluvila Buddha statue is considered to be a masterpiece, and is one of the best examples of the ancient Sri Lankan sculpting art, along with the Samadhi statue in Anuradhapura. The Toluvila statue is also one of the best-preserved images of the Buddha that has been found in Sri Lanka. It is carved out of a single block of granite, and bears a close resemblance to the Samadhi statue, although slightly smaller. The Toluvila statue is 5 feet 9 inches (1.75 m) in height. It shows the Buddha seated with his legs crossed and hands together in meditation, depicting the dhyana mudra. The seating style is known as weerasana. The distance between the shoulders is 3 feet 5 inches (1.04 m), while the knees are 5 feet 9 inches (1.75 m) apart.

While many other Buddha statues from the same period have long, hanging earlobes, the Toluvila statue lacks this feature. Another unusual feature is three lines that have been carved into the front of the neck that are believed to have been influenced by the Mathura School of India. It is possible that seated Buddha images, such as the one found at the Wat Phra Borom That temple in Chaiya, Thailand, may have been influenced to some extent by statues of the Anuradhapura period like the Toluvila statue.

== History ==
Historians believe that it dates back to the latter part of the Anuradhapura period, specifically the 4th or 5th century. It was found in 1900 during archaeological excavations conducted in the village of Toluvila in Anuradhapura by archaeologist Harry Charles Purvis Bell. According to him, it was the best historical artifact found in Anuradhapura. The statue was later taken to the National Museum of Colombo, where it is kept to this day. The museum identifies it as the "most significant" sculpture of ancient Sri Lanka that it possesses, and it is displayed directly in front of the main entrance to the building.
