= Isurumuniya =

Buddhist temple in Anuradhapura, Sri Lanka

- ඉසුරුමුණිය (Sinhala)
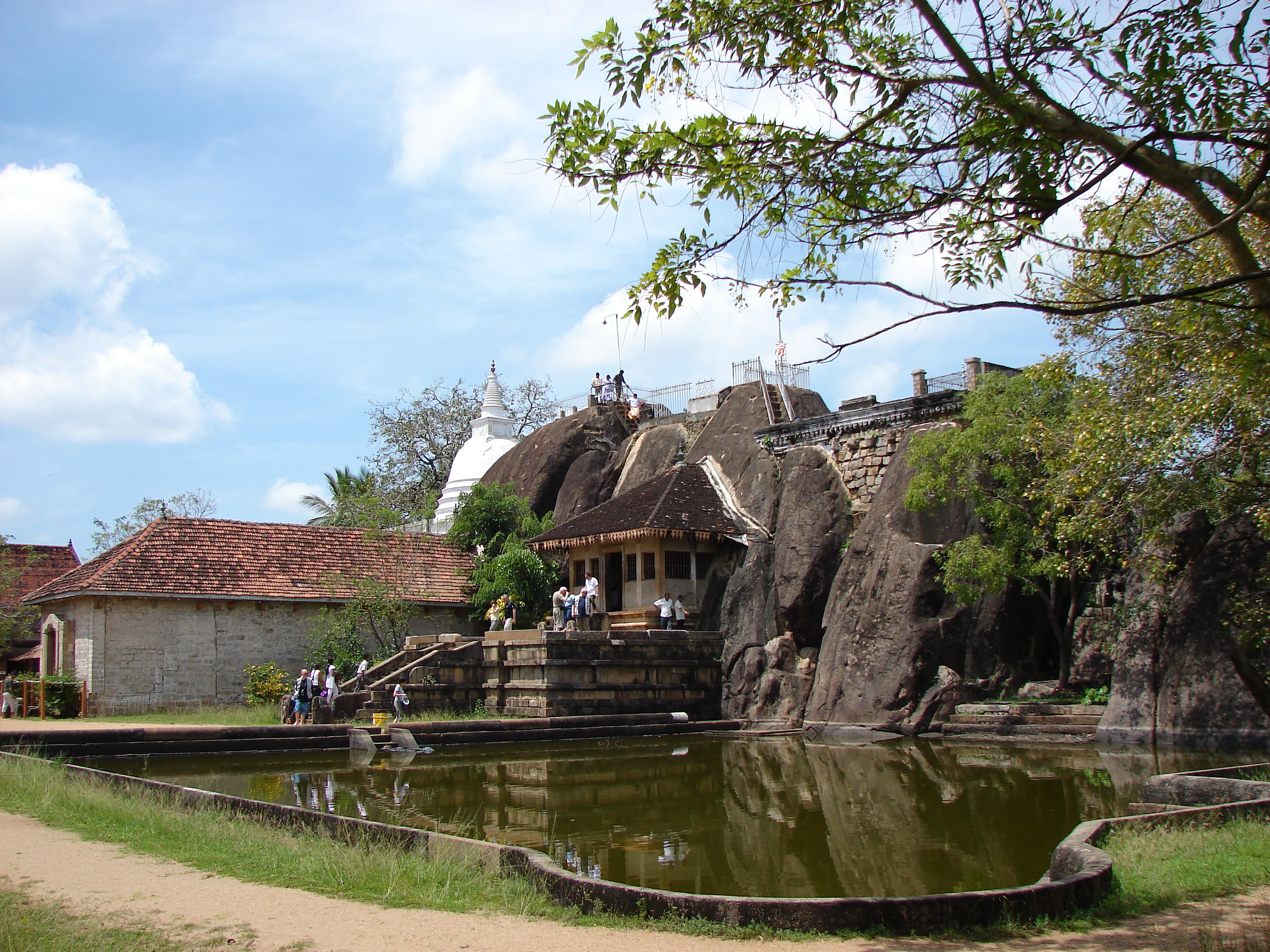
- Isurumuniya temple

- Location within Sri Lanka
- 8.3346°N 80.3904°E
- Location: Anuradhapura, Sri Lanka

Archaeological Protected Monument of Sri Lanka

Isurumuniya (Sinhala: ඉසුරුමුණිය) is a Buddhist temple situated near to the Tissa Wewa (Tisa tank) in Anuradhapura, Sri Lanka. There are four carvings of special interest in this Vihara. They are the Isurumuniya Lovers, Elephant Pond and The Royal Family.

== History ==
The ancient Meghagiri Vihara or Meygiri Vihara is presently identified as the Isurumuni Vihara. It was built by King Devanampiya Tissa (307 BC to 267 BC) who ruled in the ancient Sri Lankan capital of Anuradhapura. After 500 children of high-caste were ordained, Isurumuniya was built for them to reside. King Kasyapa I (473-491 AD) again renovated this viharaya and named it as "Boupulvan, Kasubgiri Radmaha Vehera" giving the names of his 2 daughters and his name. There is a viharaya connected to a cave and above is a cliff. A small stupa is built on it. It can be seen that the constructional work of this stupa belongs to the present period. Lower down on both sides of a cleft, in a rock that appears to rise out of a pool, have been carved the figures of elephants. On the rock is carved the figure of a horse. The carving of Isurumuniya lovers on the slab has been brought from another place and placed it there. A few yards away from this vihara is the Ranmasu Uyana.

== Archaeological ruins ==
‘Siddha mahayaha kuni – maha (la) ka Asala yaha (di) ni’ [Hail! The cell of Mahaya is given to Venerable Asalaya]

The above Brahmi inscription was inscribed at the original place where the Isurumuniya Lovers were originally sculptured and placed. It is a special one as a letter in this inscription is 3 inches x 4 inches in size. After donating Vessagiriya to Maha Sangha this sculpture would have been removed and placed at its present place. The Lovers in the sculptured plaque are King Kuvera Vaisrawana and his Queen Kuni. Ramayana states that Vaisrawana who lived in Vessagiriya ruled Sri Lanka from Lankapura before Rawana.

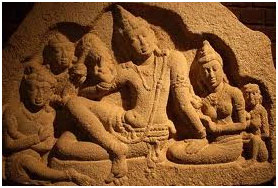
Royal Family carving in the Isurumuniya Viharaya

=== Royal Family Carving ===
- Place: Isurumuniya Viharaya
- Century: 8th century A.D
- Period: Anuradhapura Period
- Tradition: Guptha Kala (mystic)
- Medium: Granite
- Method: low relief "Ardha Unnata"

The Royal Family carving is carved on a Granite plate.There are five human figures carved on this plate. The human figure in the center is King Dutugamunu, who has a tall crown on his head and a "puna noola" around his chest. At his left are another two human figures. They are fanning him with a "Wijinipath"

=== Elephant Pond Carving ===
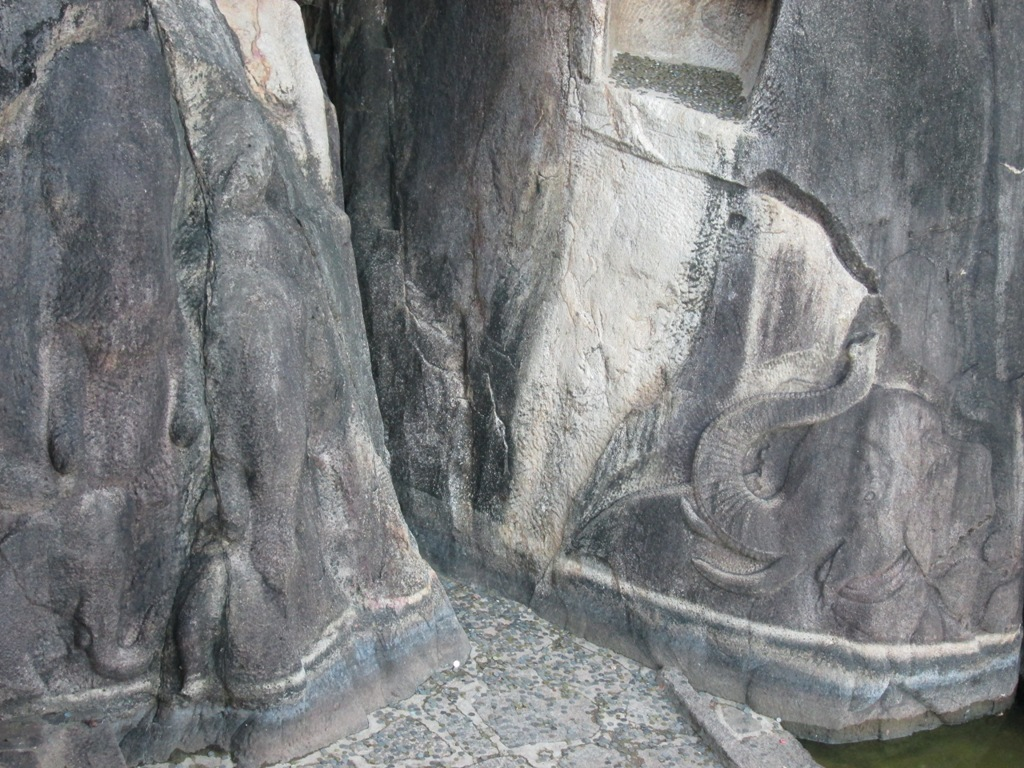
Elephant pond carving in Isurumuniya

- Place: Isurumuniya Rock
- Century: 7th century A.D
- Period: Anuradhapura Period
- Tradition: Pallawa
- Medium: Granite
- Method: low relief "Ardha Unnata"

There are four elephants in this carving. It shows them bathing. The elephant figures here are very similar to the elephant figures in "Mamallapuram" In India.

== See also ==
- Ancient constructions of Sri Lanka
- Atamasthana
- Buddhism
- Mahawamsa.
