= Vessagiriya =

- වෙස්සගිරිය (Sinhala)
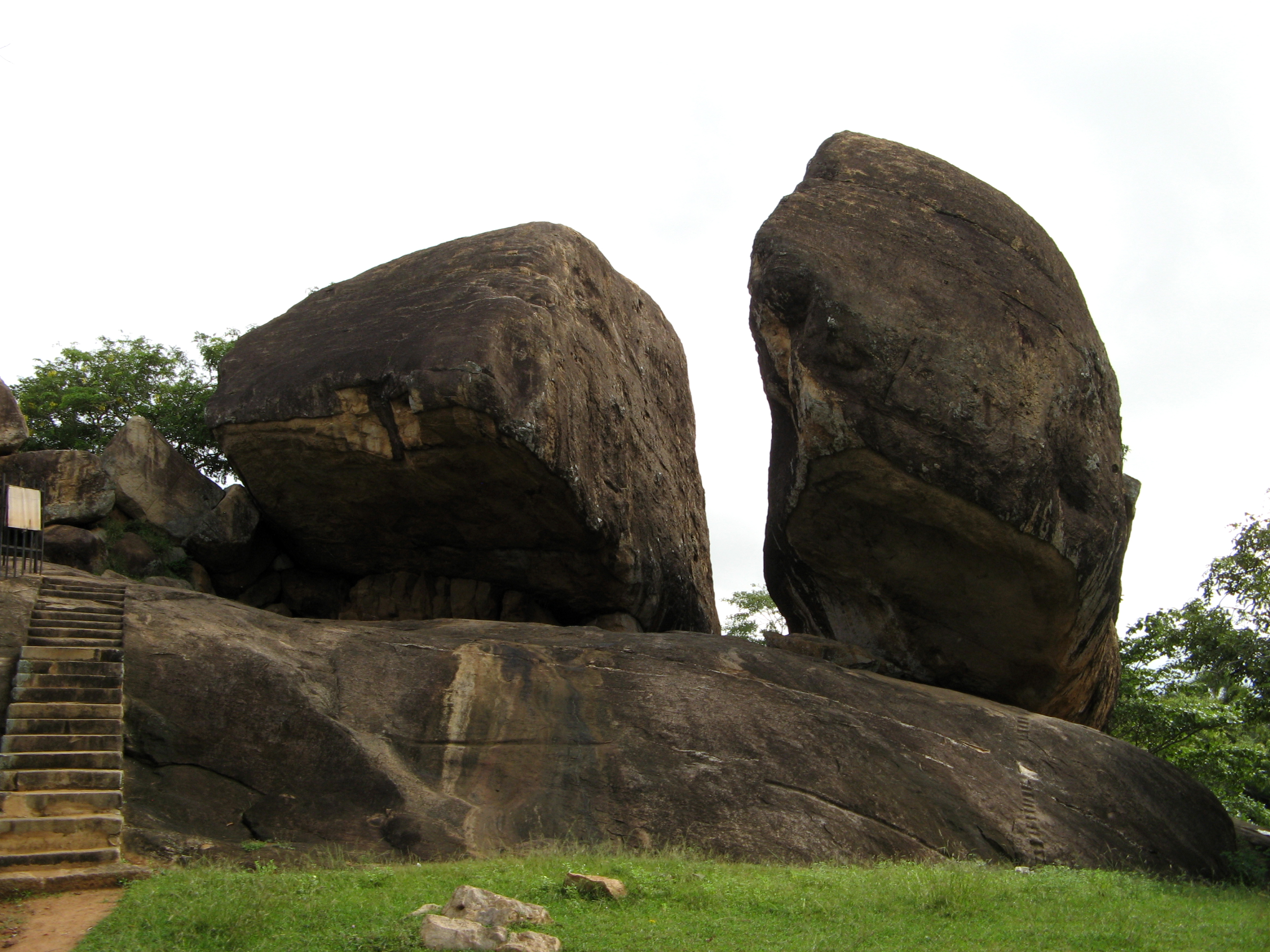
- Rock shelters at Vessagiri

- Location within Sri Lanka
- 8°21′N 80°23′E
- Location: Anuradhapura, Sri Lanka

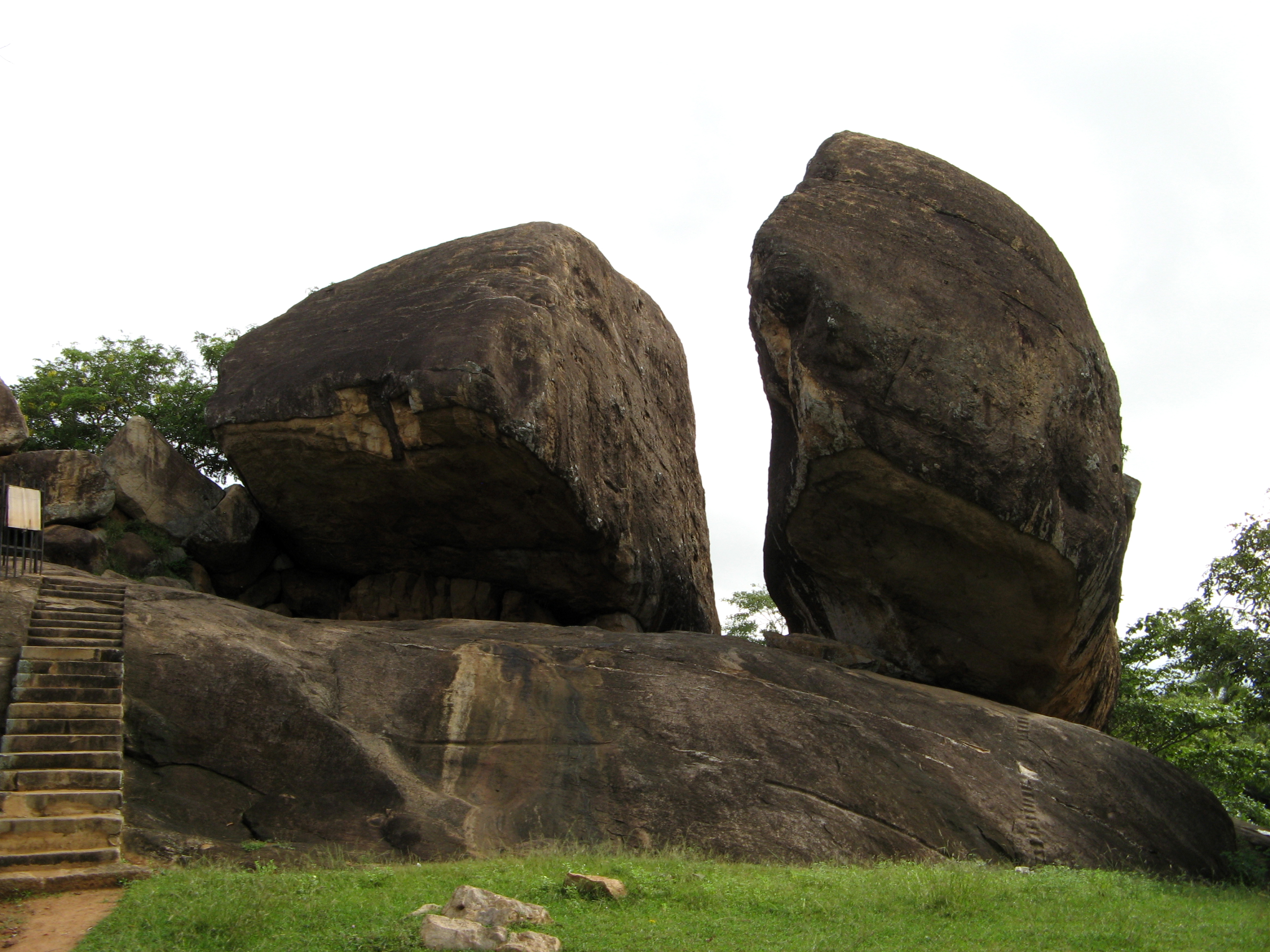
Rock shelters at Vessagiri

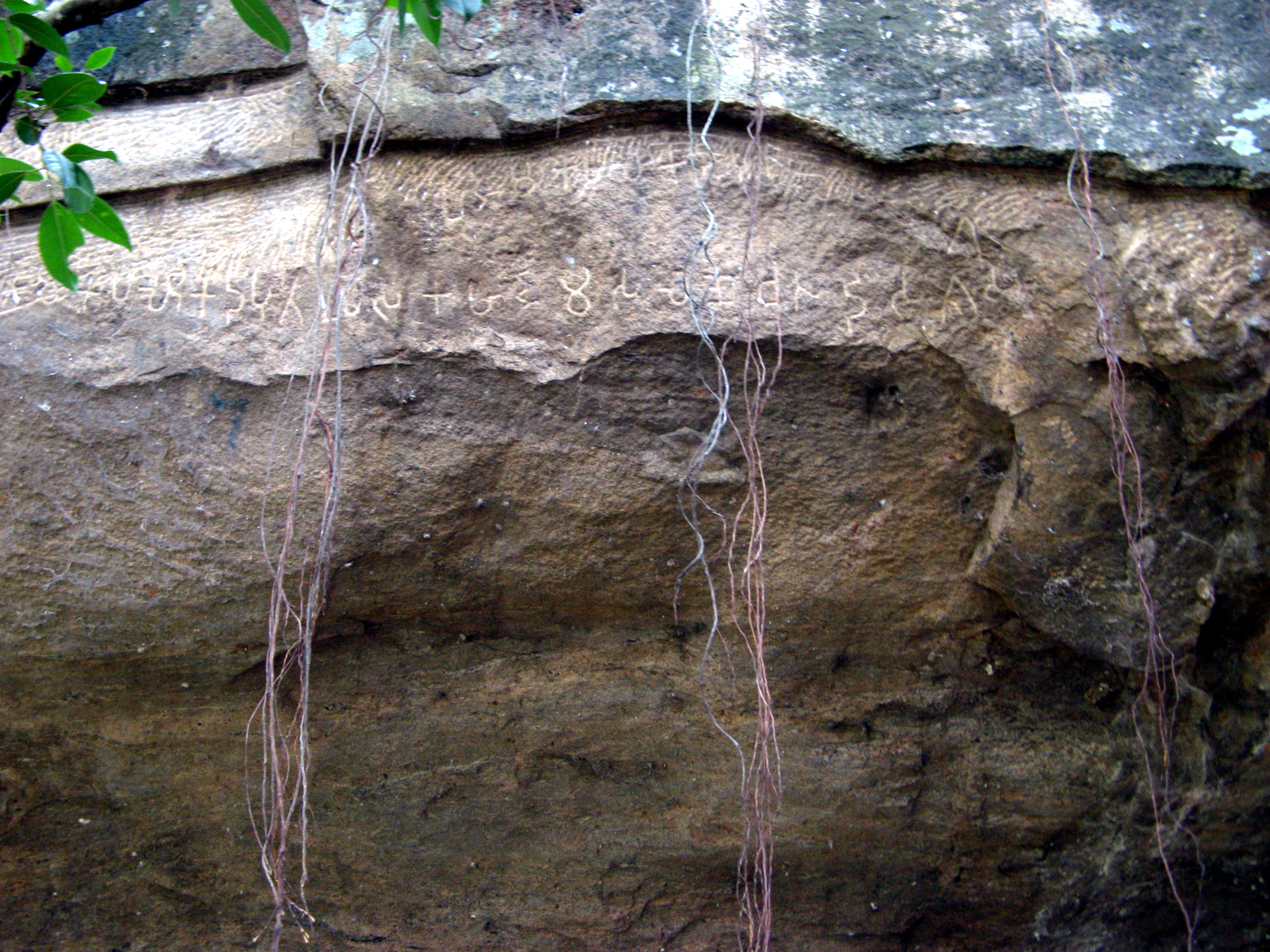
Drip ledge with Brahmi script at Vessagiri

Vessagiriya, or Issarasamanarama, is an ancient Buddhist forest monastery that is part of the ruins of Anuradhapura, one of the ancient capitals of Sri Lanka. It is located about half a mile south of Isurumuniya, among boulders. Begun in the reign of King Devanampiya Tissa (mid-3rd century BC), the site was expanded during the reign of King Kasyapa (473 - 491 AD) to become home to about five hundred monks.

The Vessagiri monks lived in rock shelters that were constructed by quarrying from local materials. Today's visitor sees only the bare stones - and not all of those, since much of the rock was later carted away and reused elsewhere. But when occupied, the dwellings were finished using wood and other perishable materials.

Above the shelters are inscribed the names of donors written in Brahmi script.
