= Samadhi Statue =

Lord Buddha's statue in Sri Lanka

Samadhi Buddha
- සමාධි බුදු පිළිමය
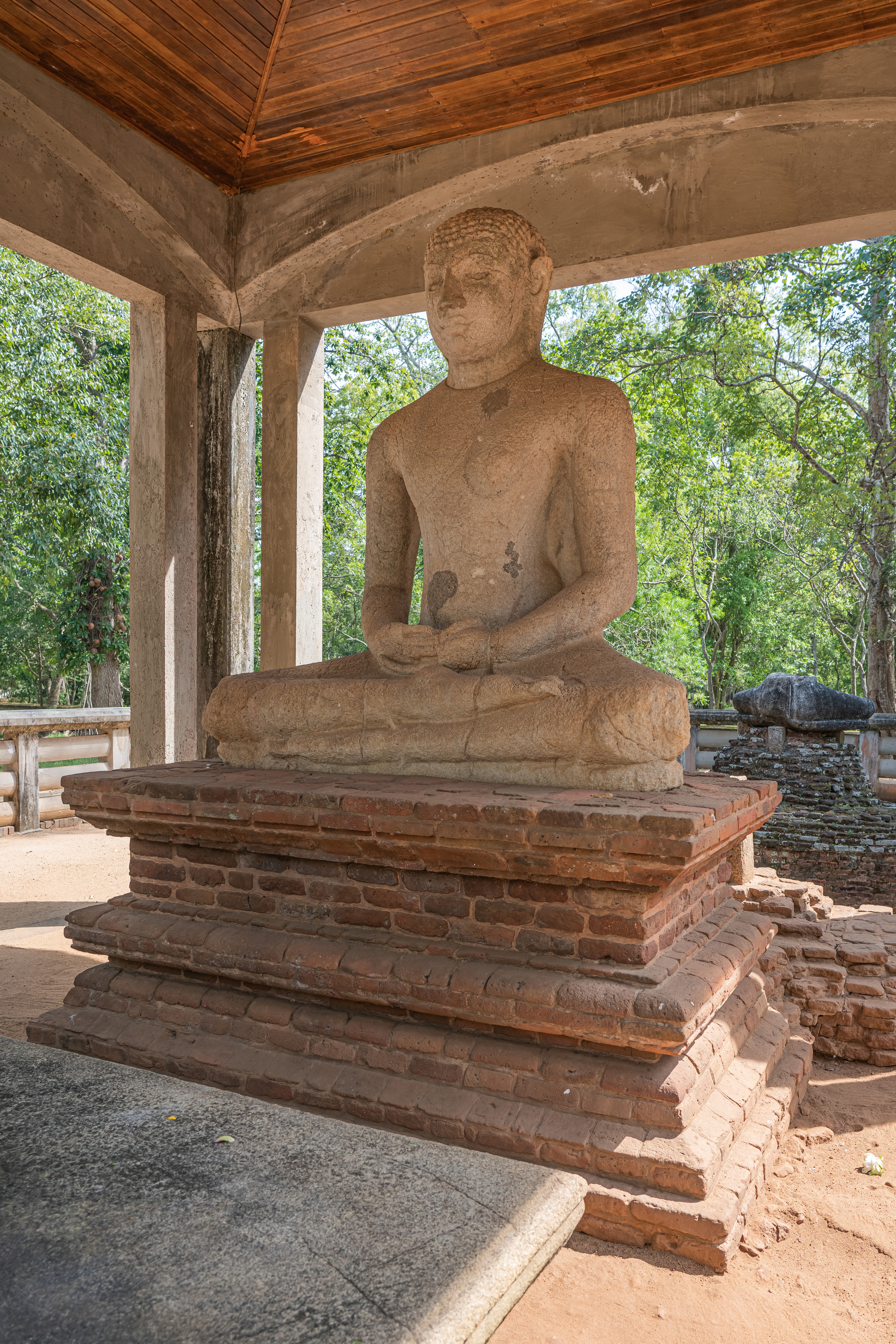

Religion
- Affiliation: Buddhism
- District: Anuradhapura
- Province: North Central Province
- Region: Mahamevnāwa Park

Location
- Country: Sri Lanka
- Interactive map of Samadhi Buddha
- Coordinates: 8°22′12″N 80°23′53″E

Architecture
- Type: Buddha Statue
- Height (max): 7ft 3in
- Archaeological Protected Monument of Sri Lanka

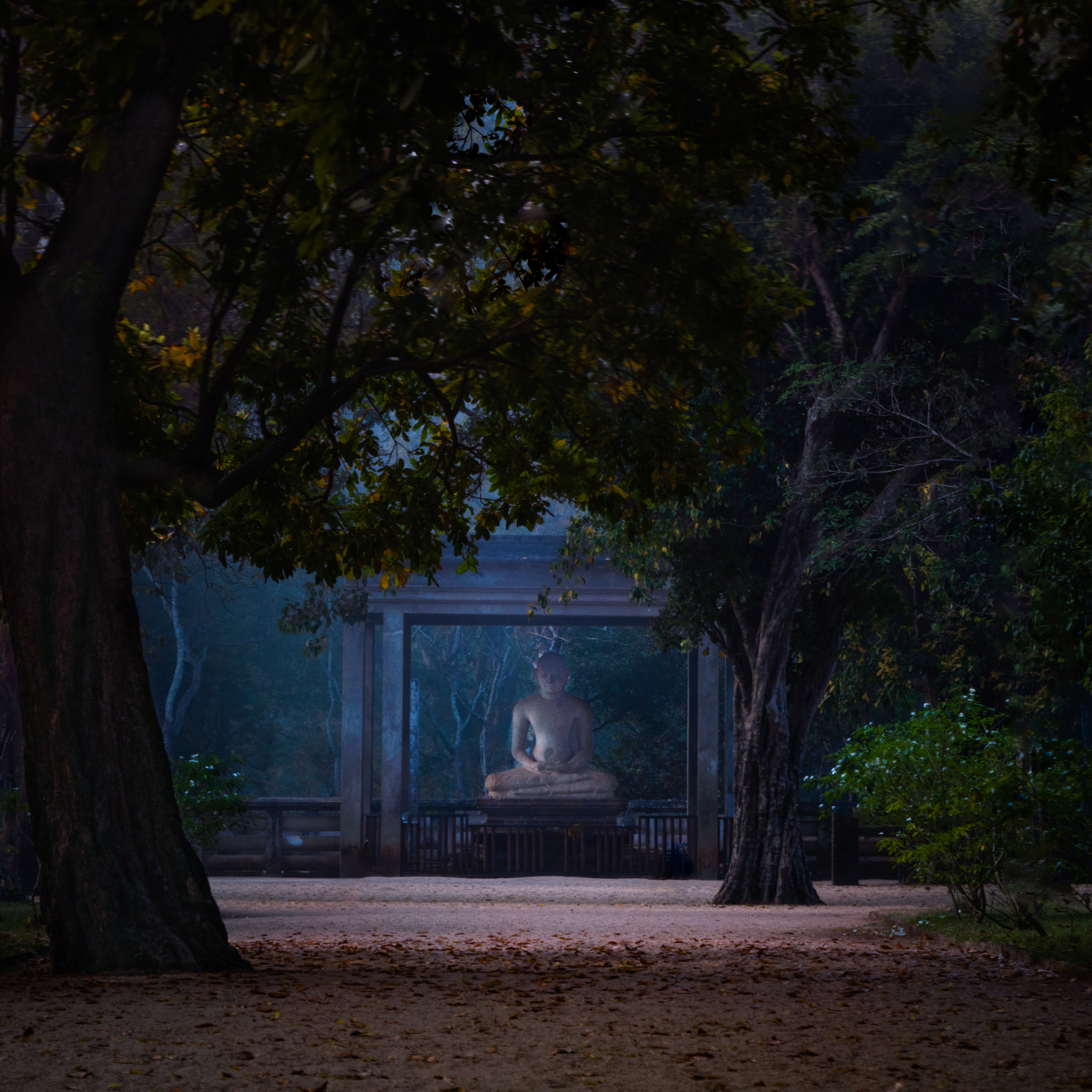
Samadhi Buddha statue at Mahamevnāwa Park in Anuradhapura, Sri Lanka.

The Samadhi Buddha is a famous statue situated at Mahamevnāwa Park in Anuradhapura, Sri Lanka. The Buddha is depicted in the position of the Dhyana Mudra, the posture of meditation associated with his first Enlightenment. This statue is 7 feet 3 inches in height and carved from dolomite marble.. It is similar to the Toluvila statue from the same period. It is similar to Gupta period Buddha images, it is believed that originally the image was gilded and had inlaid eyes made of precious gems. It is likely that it was one of the four statues around a sacred Bodhi tree shrine. This is the only one that has survived largely intact.

Whether the Buddha's Enlightenment was the experience technically called samadhi, or some other phenomenon, may depend upon the philosophical allegiance of the believer. In the Dhyana Mudra the Buddha sits cross-legged with his upturned palms placed one over the other on his lap. This position is universally known throughout the Buddhist world, and this statue is therefore one of the most typical pieces of Buddhist sculpture. It is not to be confused with the very similar "Earth-Touching Mudra," which depicts the simple action the Buddha took to fend off the illusions projected by Mara, who was desperate to prevent the Buddha from realizing that his, Mara's, projections, and with them the entire world, are an illusion.

The statue is dated to about 4th-6th century and is regarded as one of the finest Buddha statues in Sri Lanka. A replica, carved out of white teak, was gifted to India's Prime Minister Modi on his state visit to Sri Lanka.

Jawaharlal Nehru, India's first prime minister, mentions in his autobiography, that while in a visit with his wife and daughter to Sri Lanka in 1930s, he liked this statue greatly. While in Dehra Dun prison, a friend from Sri Lanka sent a picture of this statue, which he kept on his table in the cell. Nehru writes, "[this picture of Buddha] became a precious companion for me, and the strong, calm features of Buddha's statue soothed me and gave me strength and helped me to overcome many a period of depression."

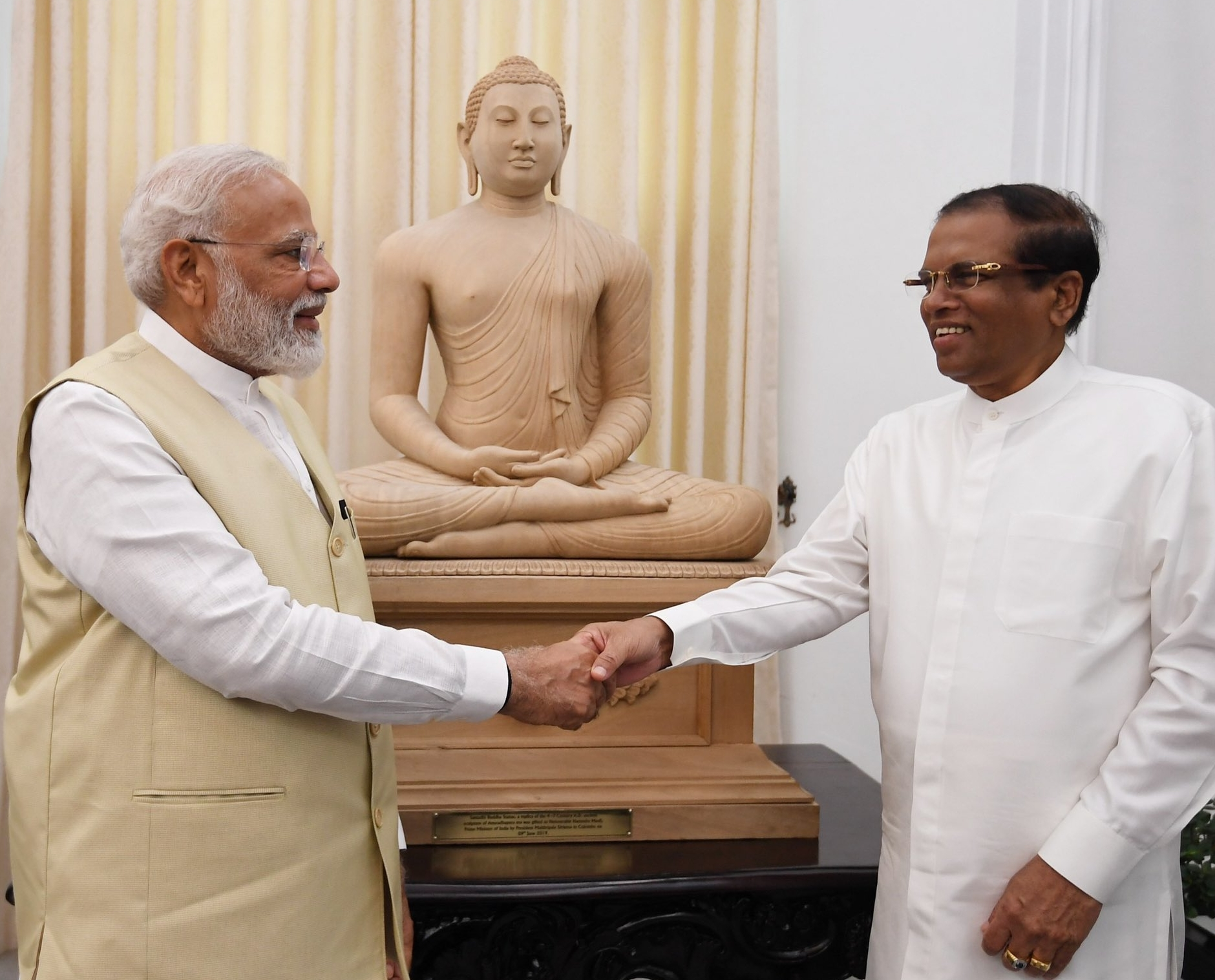
President Maithripala presented PM Narendra Modi the Samadhi Buddha replica. 2019

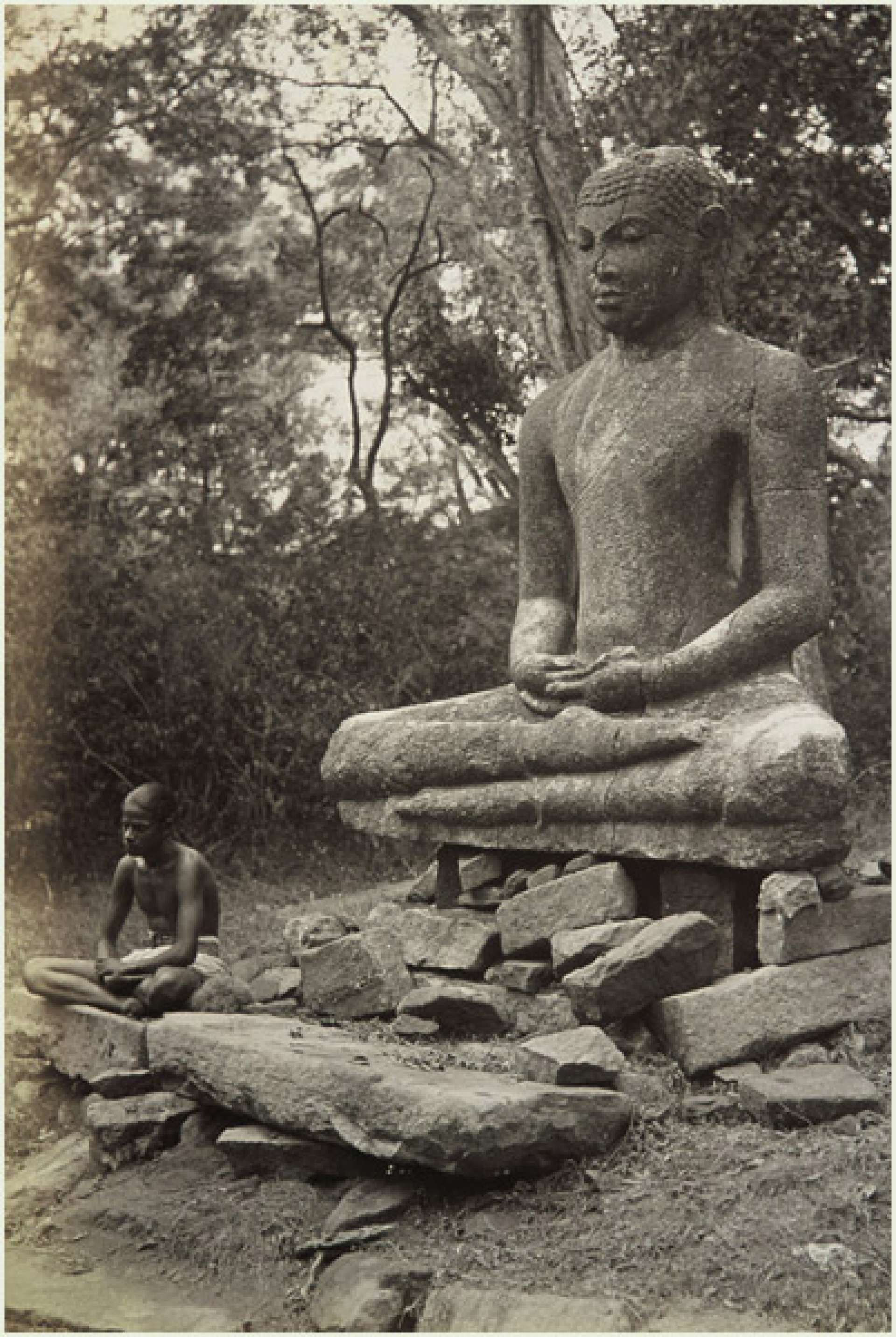
Boy with Samadhi Buddha, Anuradhapura, 1870

A 25-foot replica of the Anuradhapur Samadhi Buddha was created by a monk sculptor, the Venerable Embulawitiya Medhananda Thero, at the New Jersey Buddhist Vihara & Meditation Center (NJBV) in Franklin Township in New Jersey in USA. It has been declared a Cultural Landmark by the Township Council.

== Samadhi Buddha at Rambodagalla in Kurunegala ==
The Samadhi Buddha at Rambodagalla in Kurunegala was initiated in 2001, in response to the destruction of the Bamiyan Buddhas. Samadhi Buddha at Rambodagalla was carved in live rock by Indian craftsmen led by Muthu Muthiah Sathapathi. It is 67.5 feet tall and was completed in 13 years. Its style was inspired by the Anuradhapura Samadhi Buddha.

== See also ==
- Toluvila statue
- Ancient constructions of Sri Lanka
- Atamasthana
- Buddhism
- Mahawamsa
