= Tissa Wewa (Anuradhapura) =

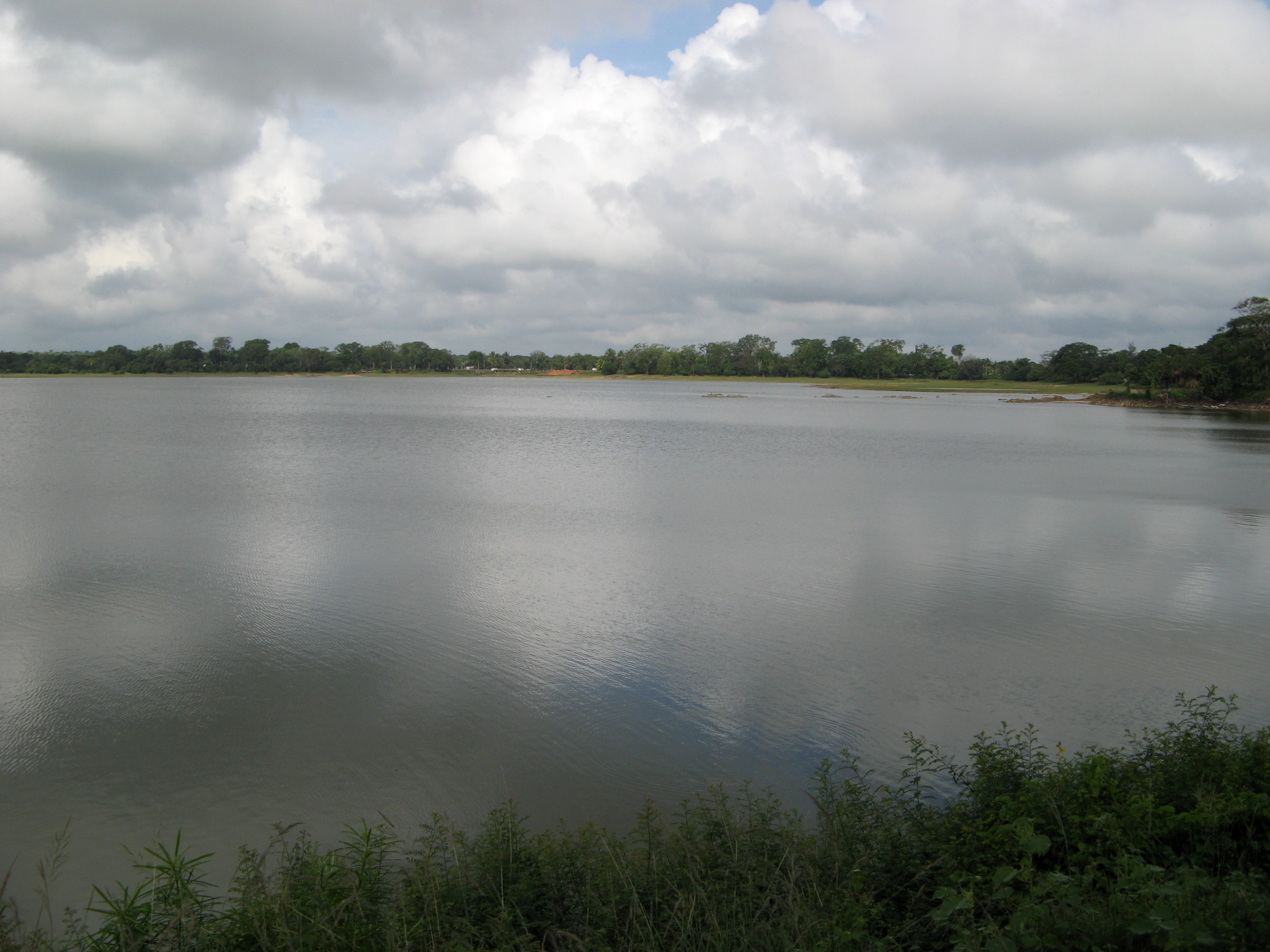
- View of Tissa Wewa

- Location within Sri Lanka
- Location: Anuradhapura
- Coordinates: 8°20.1′N 80°22.8′E
- Type: Reservoir
- Basin countries: Sri Lanka
- Surface area: 550 acres (220 ha)

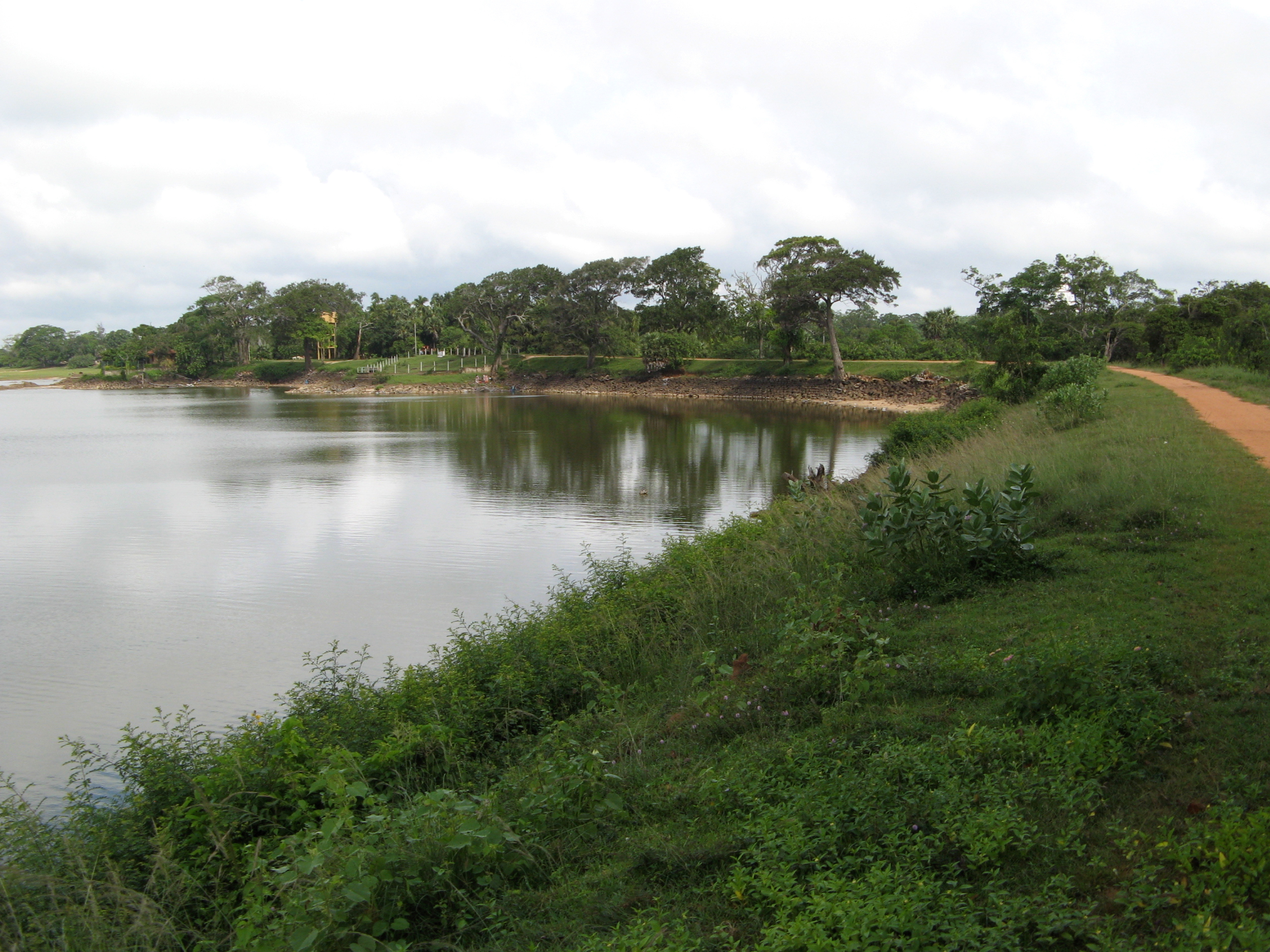
Embankment of Tissa Wewa

Tissa Wewa, an artificial reservoir, was built by Devanampiya Tissa (3rd century BC) in order to increase the water supply to his capital city of Anuradhapura. Only Panda Wewa (5th century BC) and Abhaya Wewa (5th-4th century BC) are older. The embankment of Tissa Wewa is 2 miles (3.2 km) long and 25 feet (7.6 m) high.

Among other uses, the reservoir supplied water to Tissa's Royal Gardens. In later centuries, Tissa Wewa and the other lakes were enlarged and integrated into a regional network of irrigation canals.
