= Mahamevnāwa Uyana =

Mahamevnāwa Gardens
- Location: Anuradhapura, Sri Lanka
- Coordinates: 8.361609°N 80.393538°E

Mahamevnāwa (Mahāmēgha, Pali: Mahāmeghavana) is an ancient park in Anuradhapura, Sri Lanka. It was created by King Mutasiva (367 - 307 BC) whose name is in the history as the first king who structured a park. He who was the son of King Pandukabhaya and the father of King Devanampiya Tissa.

King Pandukabhaya is the founder of the city of Anuradhapura. King Mutasiva, after succeeding his father, formed two royal gardens which was located to the south and outside the ancient capital city of Anuradhapura. The garden called Nandana (Jōtivana) was situated immediately after the south gate and then was the Mahāmēgha.

At the auspicious time the park was being started, there was an unusual fall of very heavy rain so the garden was named "maha (=heavy) megha (=shower)". According to Mahavamsa, the garden had been full of various kind of trees so with fruits and flowers.

The park is well known for the Samadhi Statue as well as several other religious sites such as Jaya Sri Maha Bodhi, Ruvanveli stupa, and Thuparama stupa, etc.

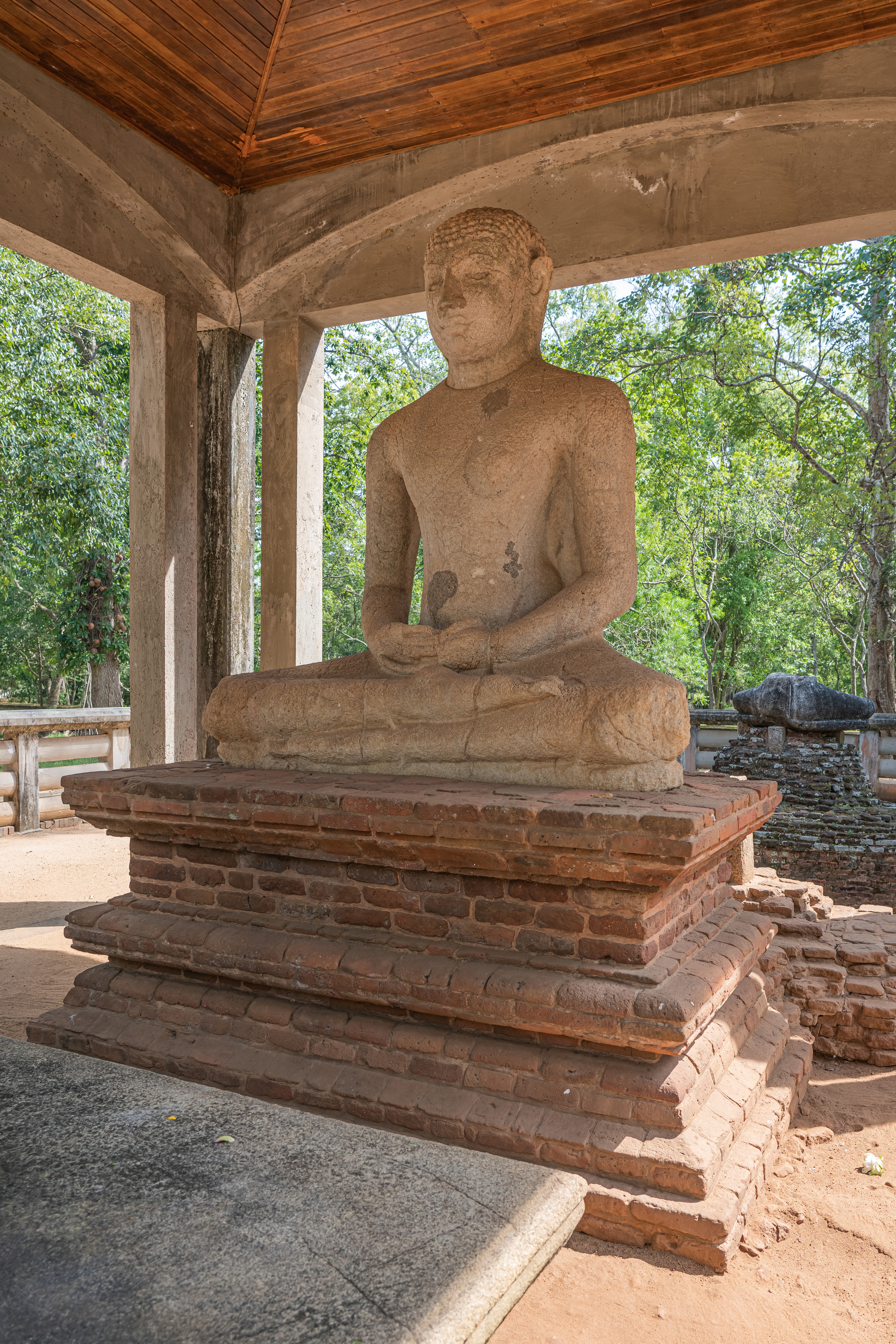
Samādhi Statue

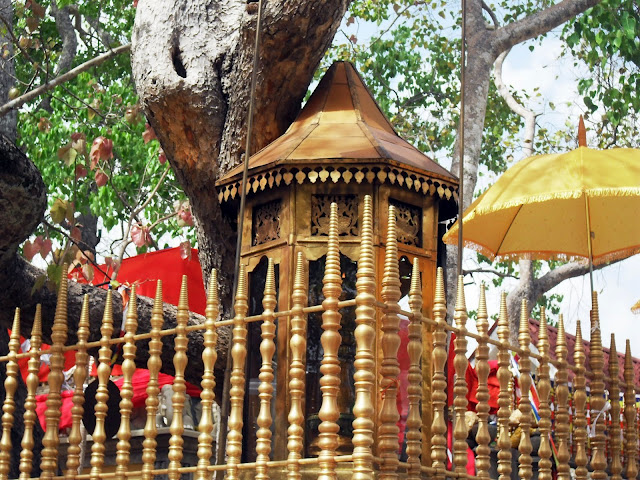
Golden Fence at Jaya Sri Maha Bodhi

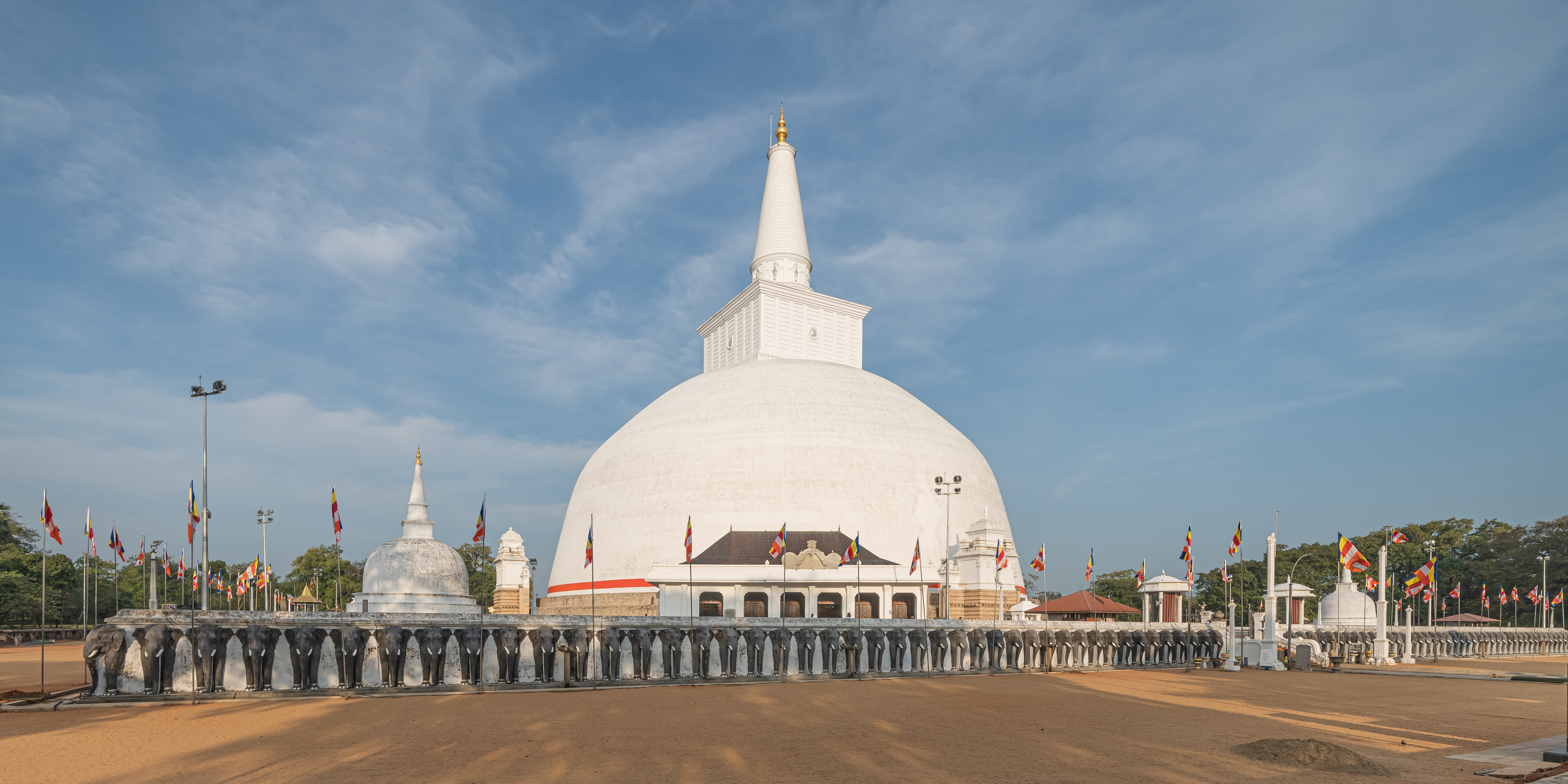
Ruwanveli Stupa

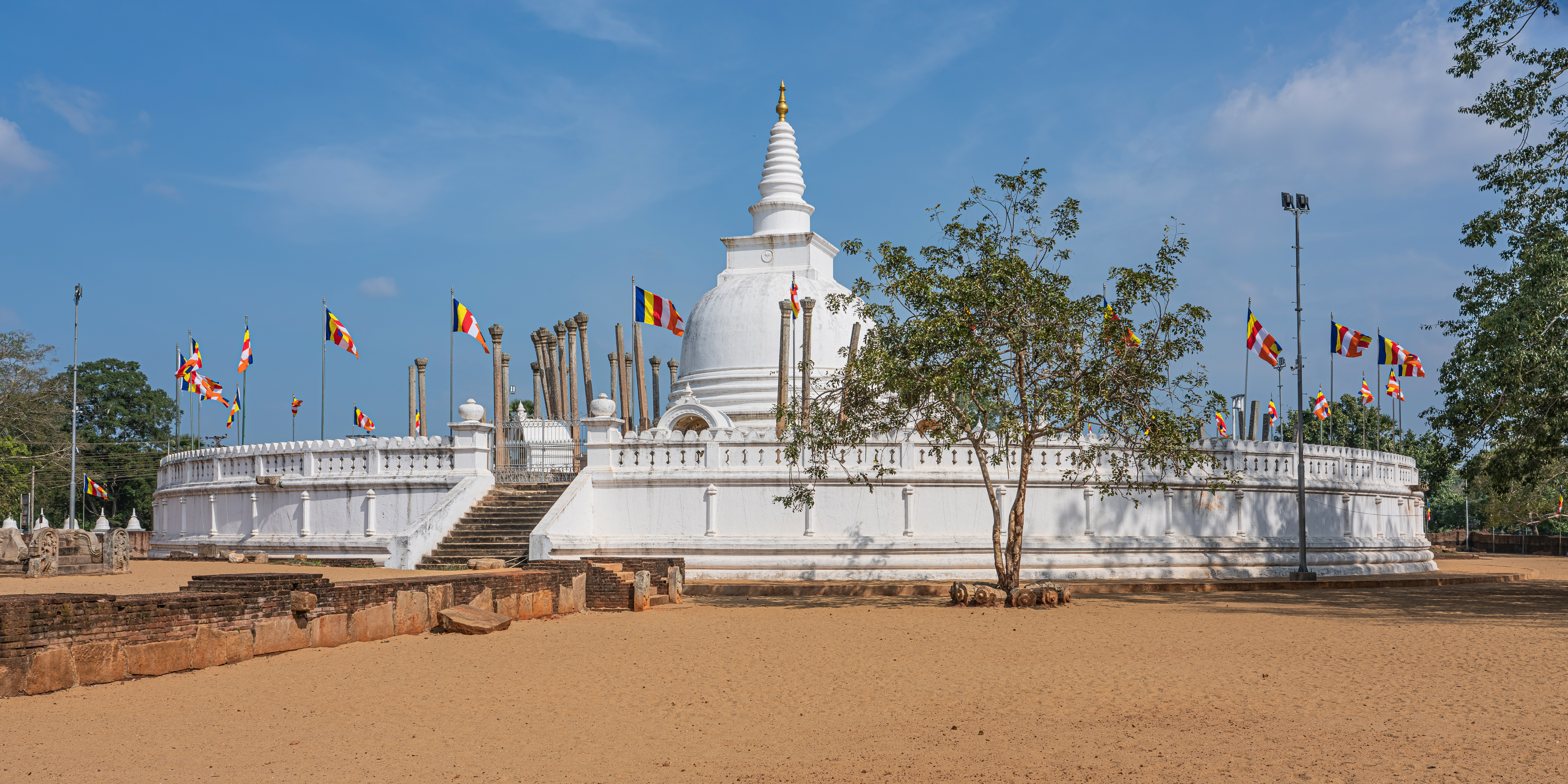
Thūpārāma Stupa
