= Anuradhapura =

Anuradhapura අනුරාධපුරය அனுராதபுரம்
- City
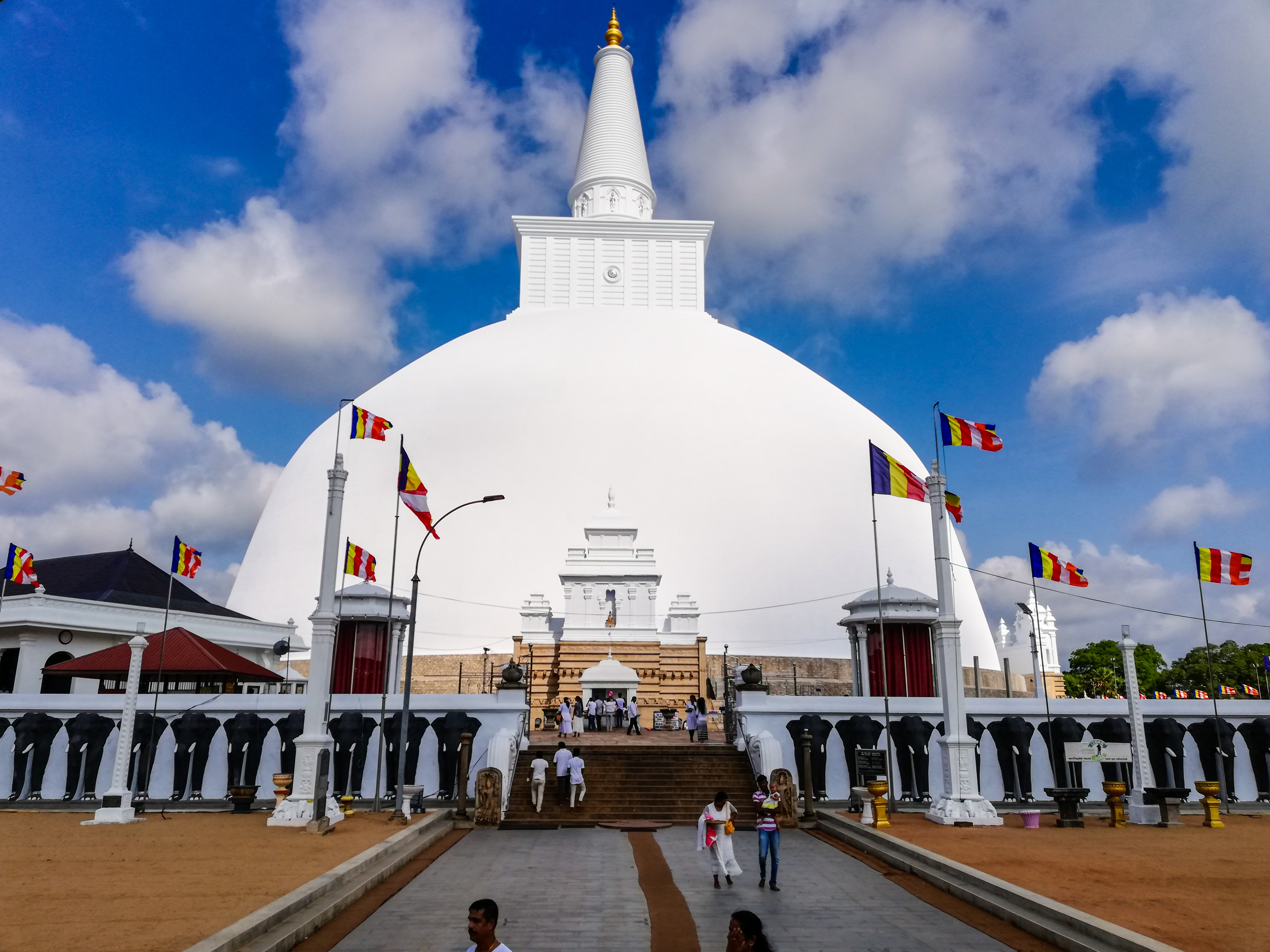
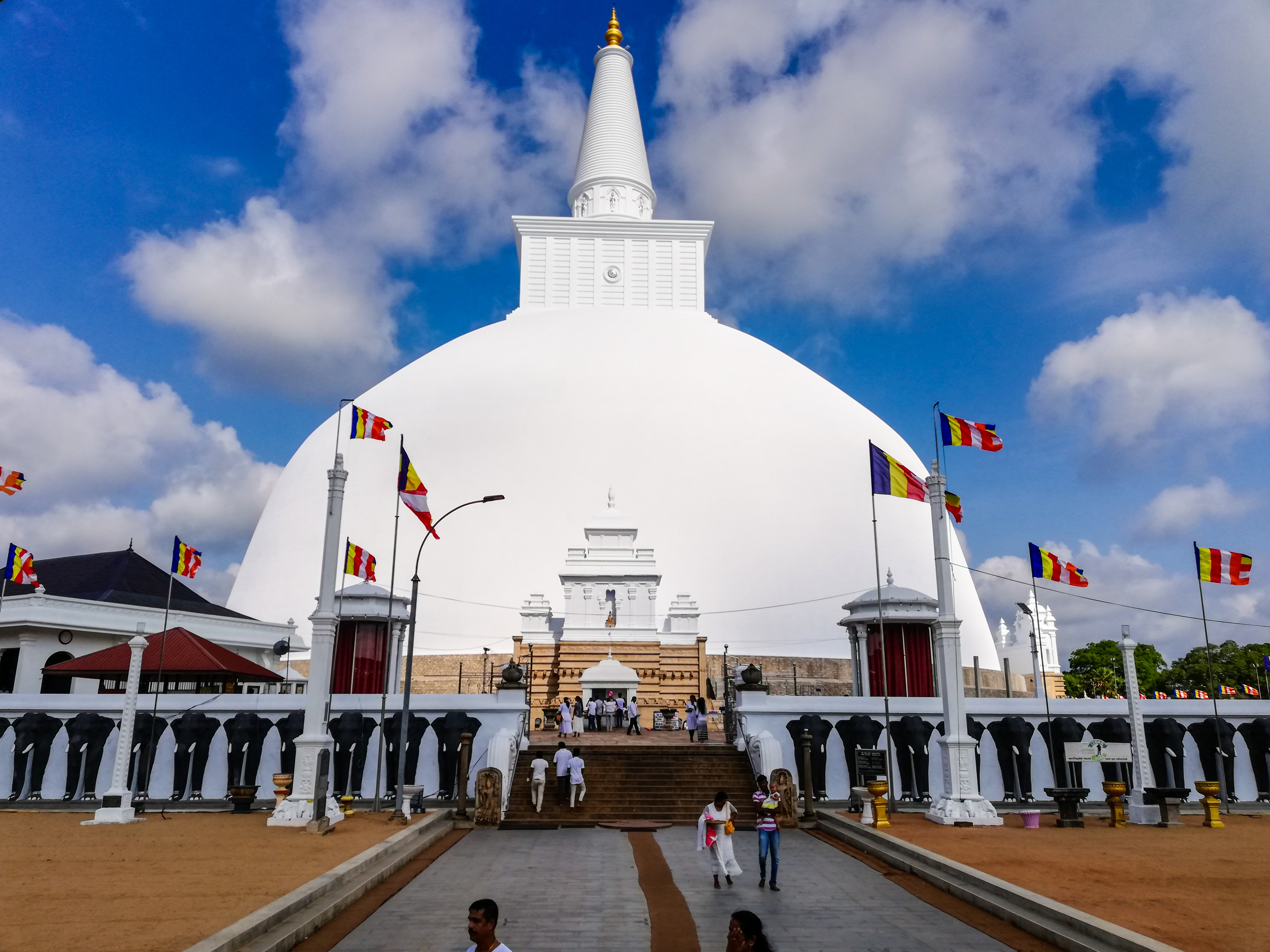
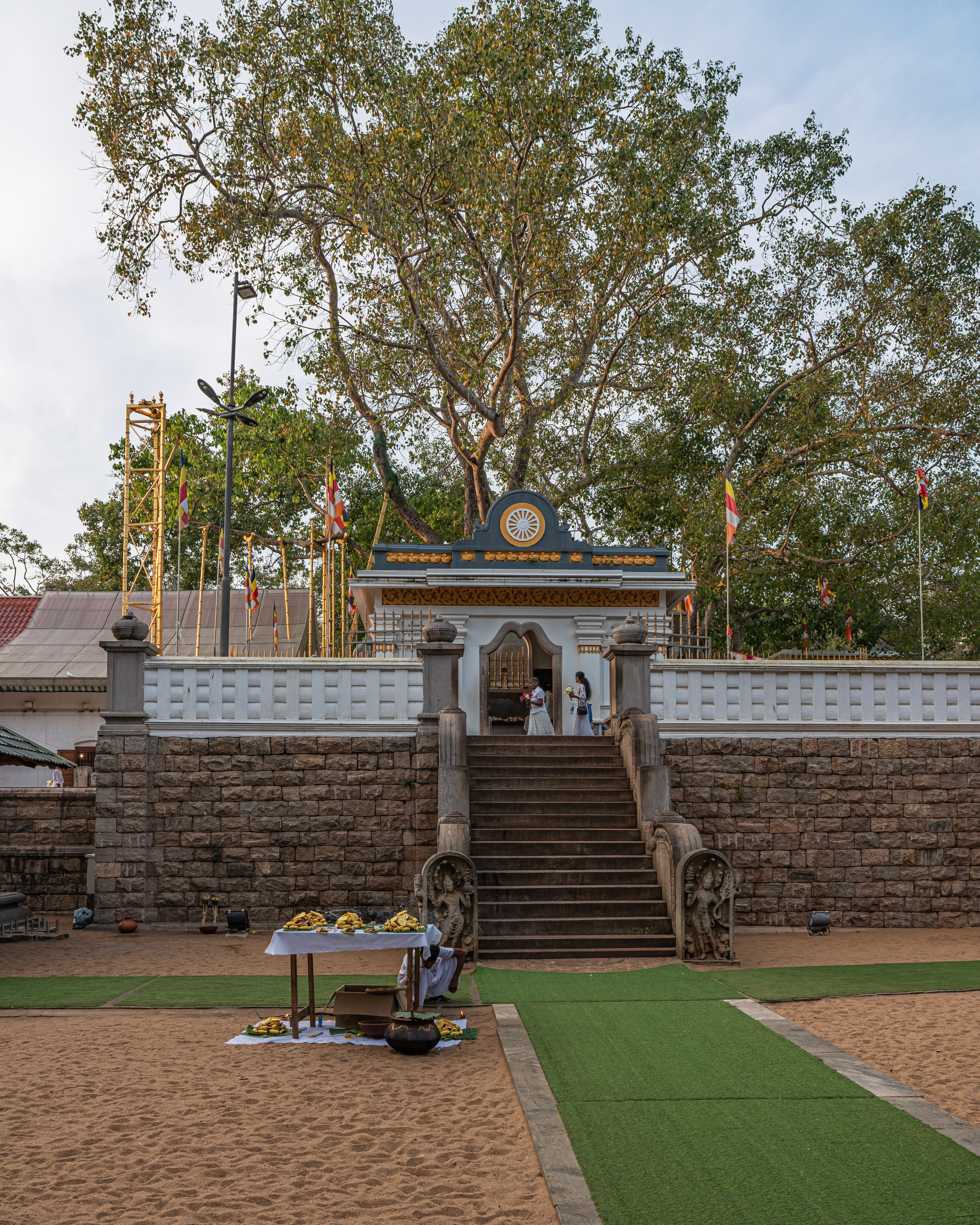
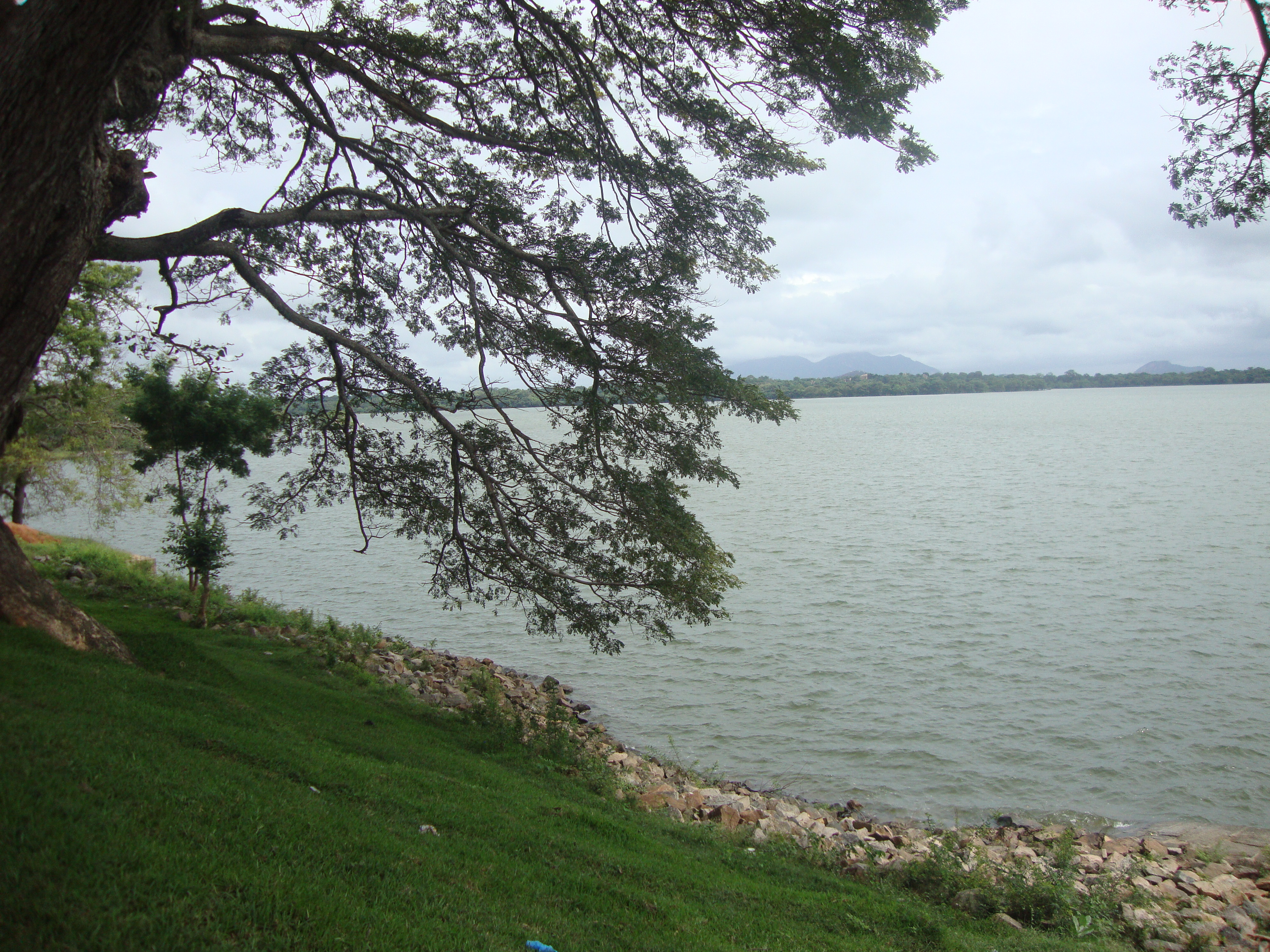
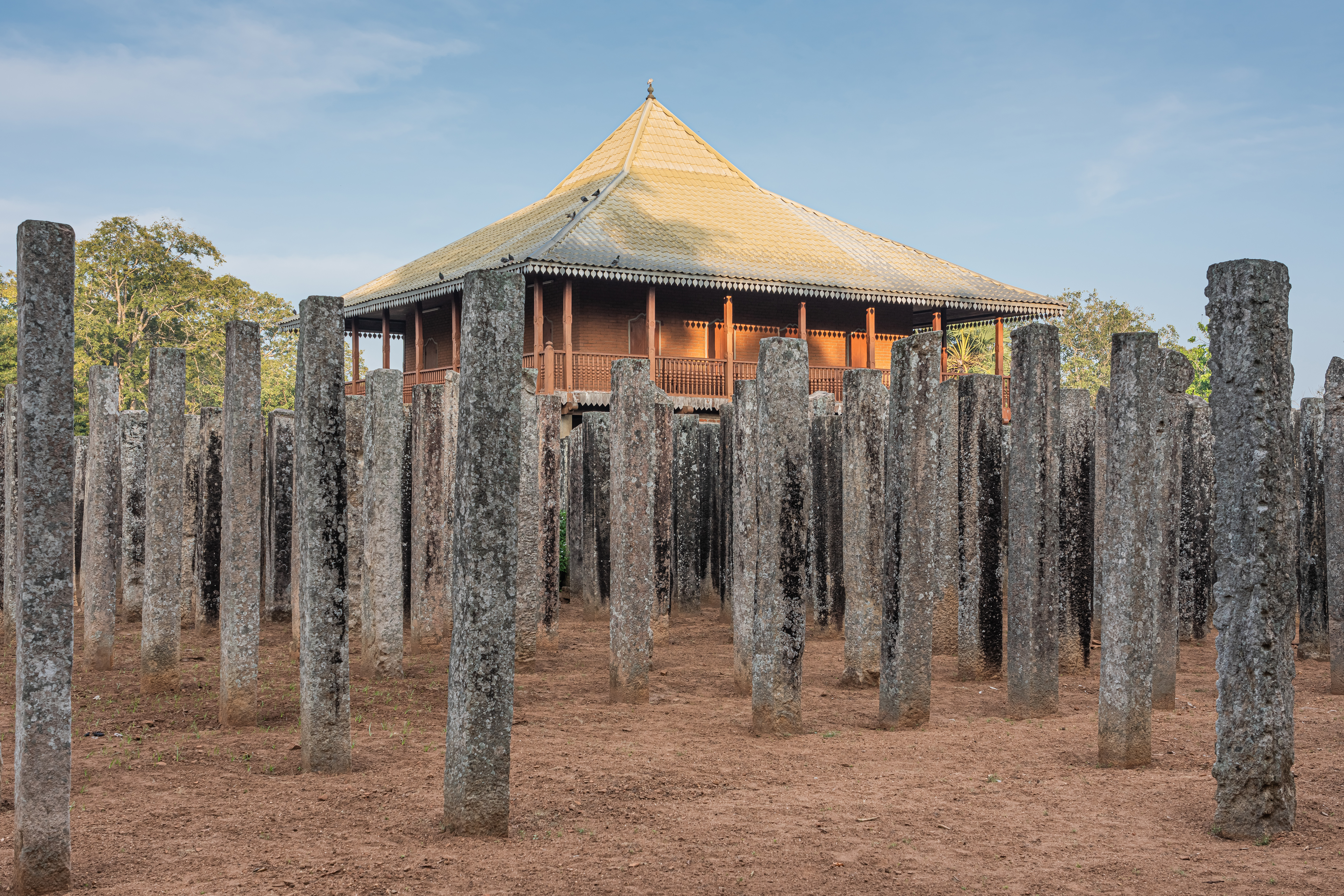
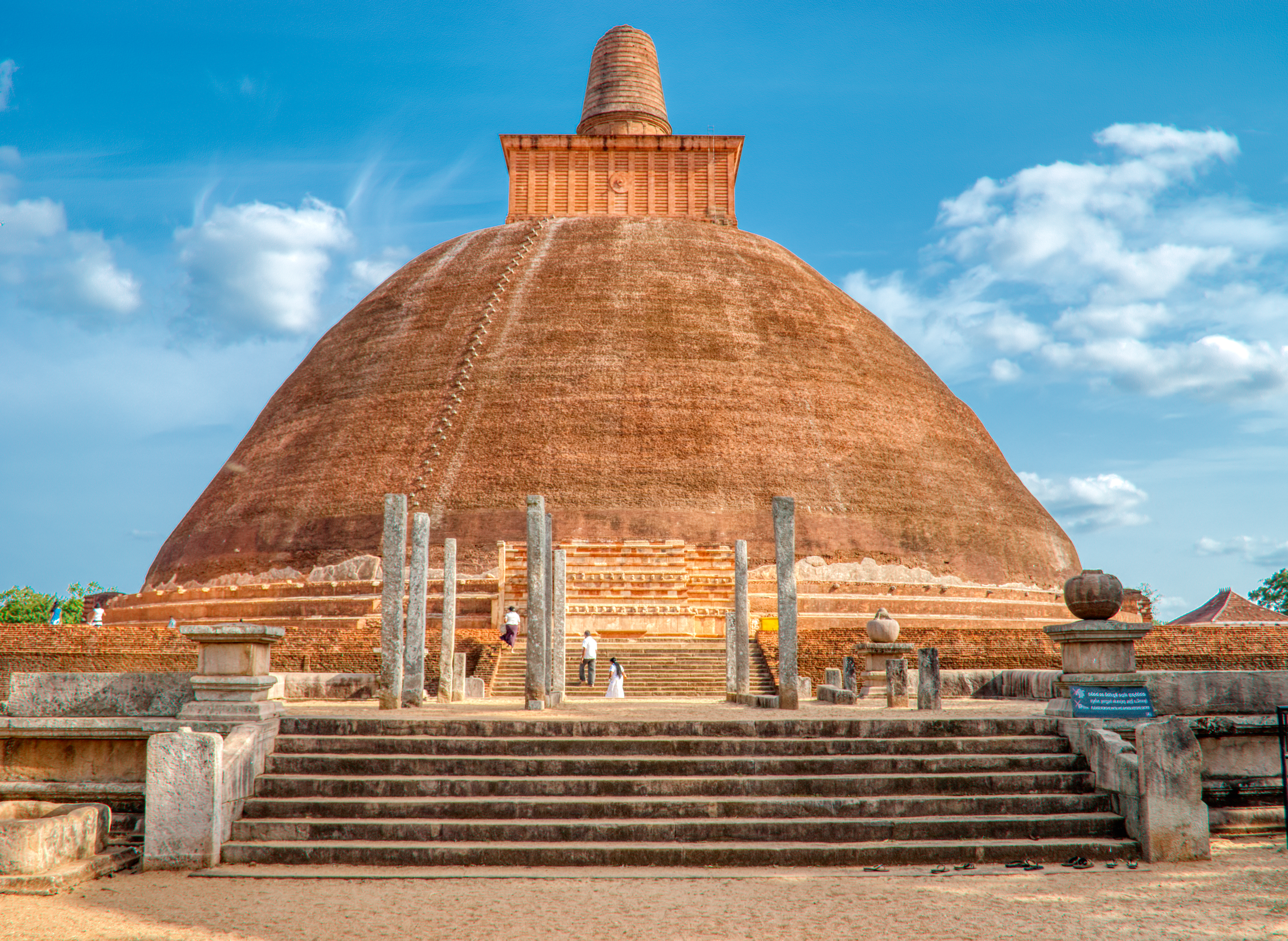
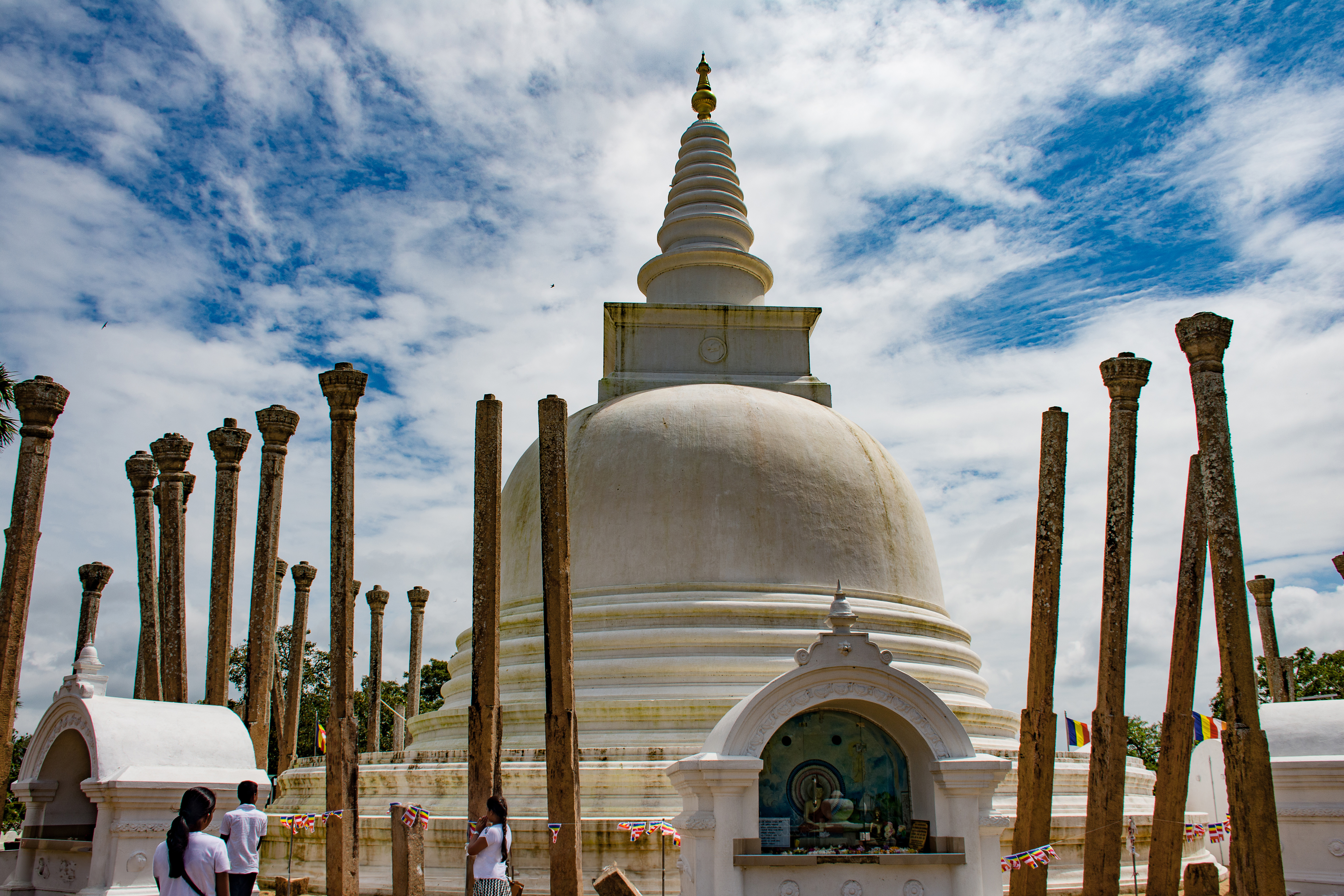
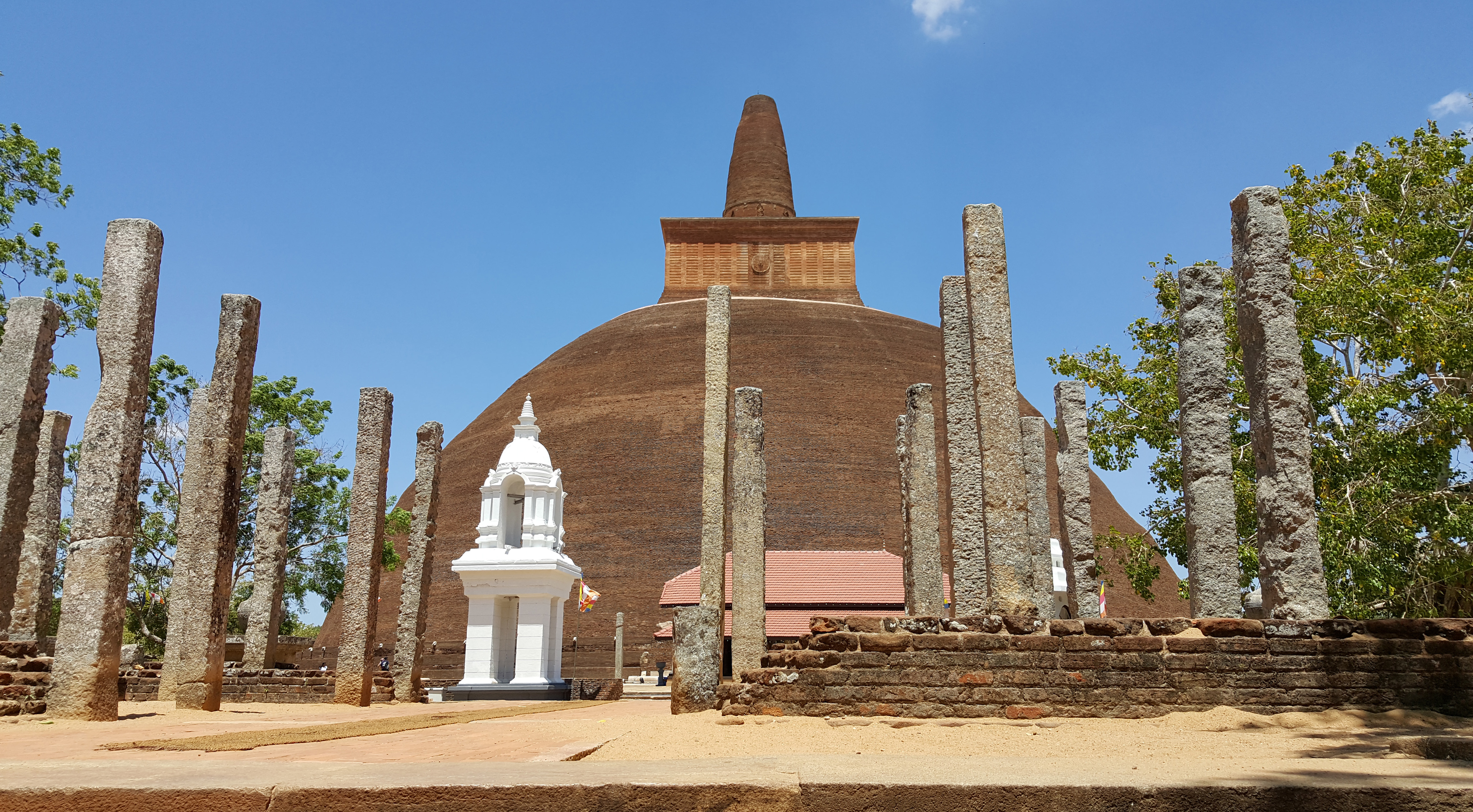
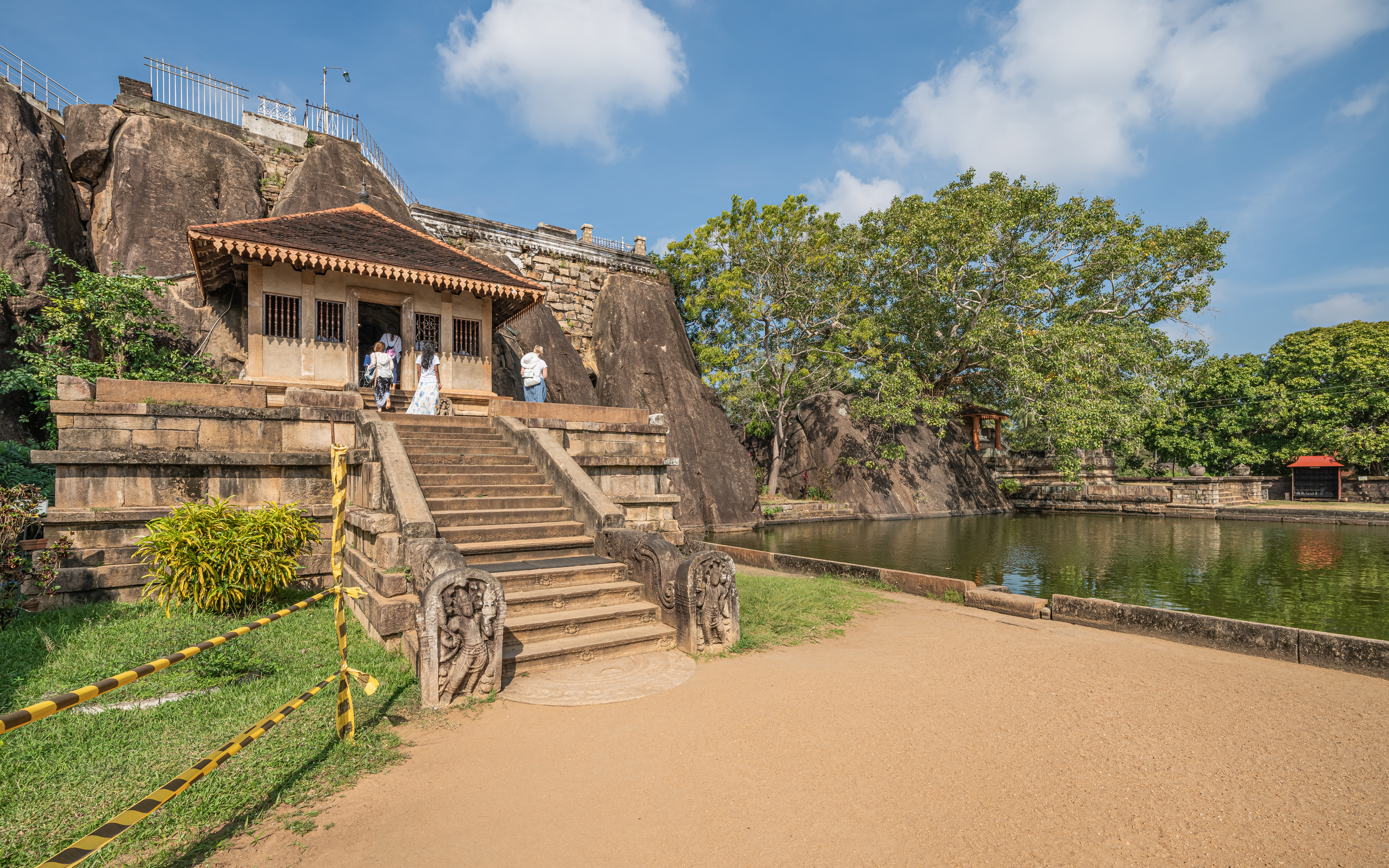
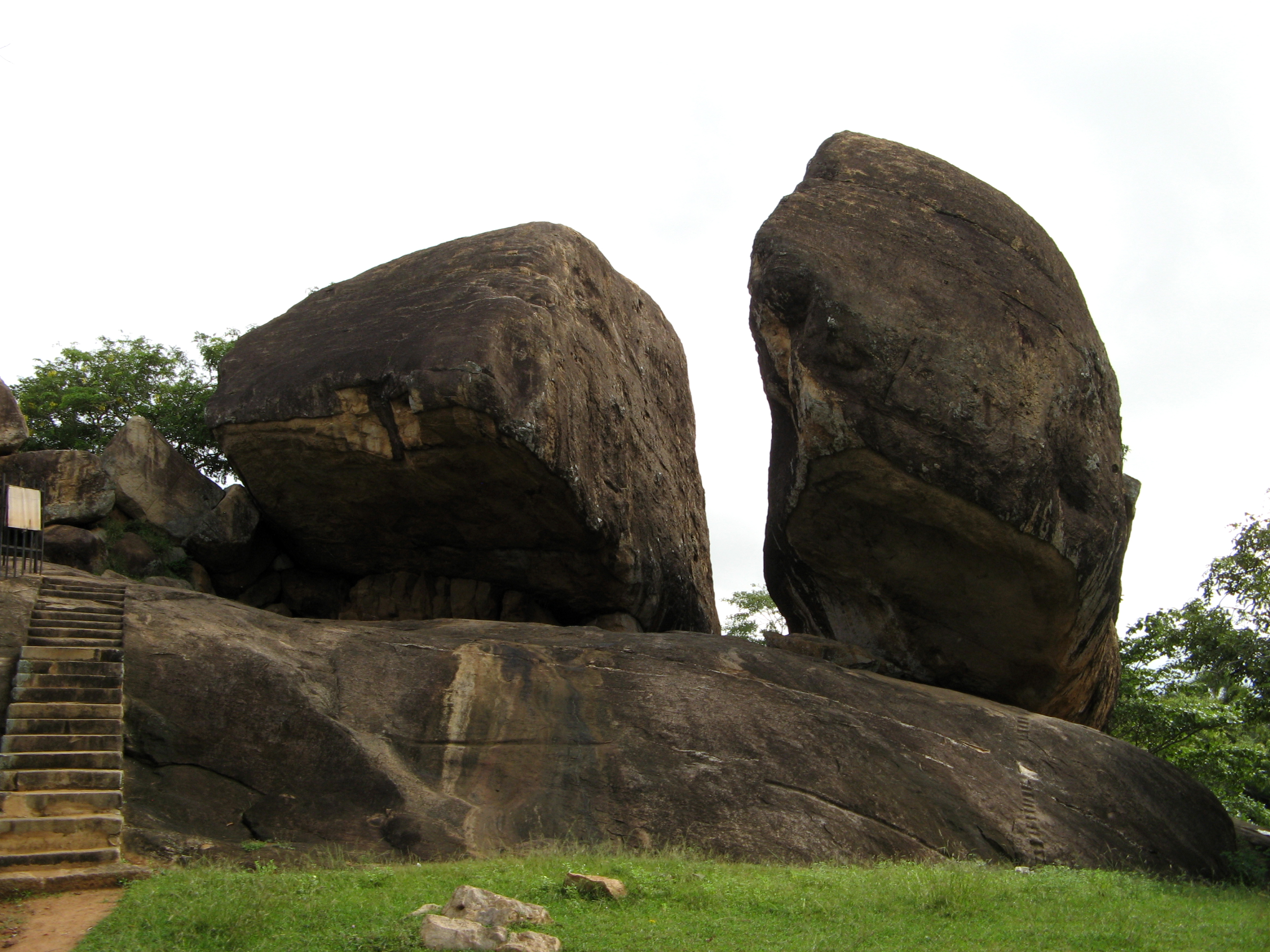
- Ruwanweli Maha Seya Anuradhapura Ruwanweli Maha Seya Jaya Sri Maha Bodhi Kala Wewa Lovamahapaya Jetavanaramaya Thuparamaya Abhayagiri Vihāra Isurumuniya Vessagiriya

- Location within Sri Lanka
- Coordinates: 8°20′6″N 80°24′39″E
- Country: Sri Lanka
- Province: North Central Province
- District: Anuradhapura
- Established: 5th century BC

Government
  - Type: Municipal Council

Area
  - City: 7,179 km^{2} (2,772 sq mi)
  - Urban: 36 km^{2} (14 sq mi)
- Elevation: 81 m (266 ft)

Population (2012)
  - City: 50,595
  - Density: 2,314/km^{2} (5,990/sq mi)
- Demonym: Anuradhians
- Time zone: UTC+5:30 (SLST)
- Postal code: 50000

UNESCO World Heritage Site
- Official name: Sacred City of Anuradhapura
- Criteria: Cultural: ii, iii, vi
- Reference: 200
- Inscription: 1982 (6th Session)

Anuradhapura (Sinhala: අනුරාධපුරය, romanised: Anurādhapuraya, IPA: [ənuraːd̪əpurəjə]; Tamil: அனுராதபுரம், romanised: Aṉurātapuram, IPA: [ɐnuɾaːðɐβuɾɐm]) is a major city located in the north central plain of Sri Lanka. It is the capital city of North Central Province and the capital of Anuradhapura District. The city lies 205 kilometres (127 mi) north of the current capital of Colombo in the North Central Province, on the banks of the historic Malwathu Oya. The city is now a World Heritage Site famous for its well-preserved ruins of the ancient Sinhalese civilisation.

While Mahāvaṃsa places the founding of the city in 437 BCE, the site has been inhabited for much longer, making it a major human settlement on the island for almost three millennia and one of the oldest continuously occupied cities in Asia. It is the cradle of the Hydraulic Sinhalese civilisation, Theravada Buddhism, and the longest-serving ancient capital of Sri Lanka that has survived for 1500 years. Moreover, it was the first capital of the Sinhala Kingdom of Rajarata, following the kingdoms of Tambapanni and Upatissa Nuwara. Anuradhapura was also the centre of Theravada Buddhism for many centuries and has been a major Buddhist pilgrimage site with ruins of many ancient Buddhist temples, including the famous Anuradhapura Maha Viharaya and the Jaya Sri Maha Bodhi, the oldest still-living, documented, planted tree in the world believed to have originated from the original Bodhi tree at Bodh Gaya (Bihar, India) under which the Buddha attained enlightenment. These vast networks of ancient temples and monasteries now cover over 100 square kilometres (40 mi^{2}) of area of the city today.

The city was mostly destroyed and largely deserted after 993 CE, with the Chola invasion from South India. Although several attempts were made by later Sinhalese kings to return the capital to Anuradhapura, it was not reestablished as a major population centre of the island until the British colonial era in the 19th century CE. Despite its decline as a political centre, Anuradhapura remained a vital pilgrimage site for Buddhists throughout the medieval period and continues to be a significant spiritual destination today. The modern revival of Anuradhapura began in the 1870s under British colonial rule, with infrastructure and urban planning initiatives aimed at supporting administration and accommodating pilgrims. The contemporary city, much of which was moved during the mid-20th century to preserve the site of the ancient capital, is a major road junction of northern Sri Lanka and lies along a railway line. The city is the headquarters of Sri Lanka's archeological survey, and tourism is a significant factor in its economy.

== Etymology ==
The origin of the name Anuradhapura is rooted in ancient Sri Lankan tradition and is documented in the Mahāvaṃsa. According to this text: “Here and there did Vijaya's ministers found villages. Anuradhagama was built by a man of that name near the Kadamba river.” This refers to Anuradha, a minister in the court of Prince Vijaya (543–505 BCE), who is credited with founding a settlement near the present-day Malwathu Oya, then known as the Kadamba River. The name Anuradhagama (from Anuradha + gama, meaning "village") was thus given to this early settlement.

In 377 BCE, during the reign of King Pandukabhaya (474–367 BCE), this village was formally established as the capital of the Sinhalese kingdom. According to the Mahāvaṃsa: “He laid out the city Anuradhapura, and established it as the capital.”

As the settlement expanded into an urban centre, its name changed to Anuradhapura—Anuradha + pura, with pura meaning “city” in Sinhala, Sanskrit, and Pali.

The antiquity of Anuradhapura is further supported by classical Western sources. In the 2nd century CE, Claudius Ptolemy, the Greco-Roman geographer, identified a place called Anourogrammoi in his Geographia, which scholars widely interpret as a reference to Anuradhagama/Anuradhapura: “Among the cities of Taprobane [Sri Lanka], there is Anourogrammoi...” This external reference underscores the city's longstanding regional prominence and recognition in ancient global cartography.

== History ==
Anuradhapura is the best representation of the beginnings of pre-modern urbanisation in Sri Lanka. The development of the initial settlement at the site of the city can be attributed to the second global cycle of historical evolution with the generalised diffusion of iron technology in the Old World through the first millennium BCE, culminating in the emergence of many historical civilisations. The history of Anuradhapura then extends from its traditional founding in the recorded history in the fourth century BCE and its subsequent laying-out by Devanampiya Tissa (250–210 BCE) to its abandonment by the last of the Anuradhapura kings at the end of the tenth century CE, its brief reoccupation in the eleventh century and the restoration of some of its major monuments, in the late 13th century CE by Vijayabahu IV (1267–1270 CE).

=== Prehistoric and Early Settlement (before 4th century BCE) ===
Even though, historical chronicle Mahāvaṃsa (5th century CE) place founding of the city in the 5th century BC, the archaeological data from the excavation of the citadel area of the old city puts the date of the human settlement as far back as the 10th century BC. According to these excavations, protohistoric Iron Age of the city spans from 900 - 600 BCE, with the appearance of iron technology, pottery, the horse, domestic cattle and paddy cultivation. In the time period 700-600 BCE, the settlement in Anuradhapura had grown over an area of at least 50 ha. Irrigable and fertile land surround the city, strategically situated with major ports northwest and northeast of the island. The city also benefited from dense jungle surroundings, providing a natural defence from invaders.

Excavation at Anuradhapura has unearthed Plain Grey Ware (in North India associated with Painted Grey Ware (PGW) pottery during vedic period) from the 'Basal early historic' period of Anuradhapura (600-500 BCE) showing connections with North India.

=== Anuradhapura as the Ancient Capital (4th century BCE – 11th century CE) ===
Details of city's development in the early historic period, spanning from 500 to 250 BCE can be found in Sinhalese Chronicles. According to these records, King Pandukabhaya formally planned the city with gates and quarters for traders. The city at the time covered an area of one square kilometre, making it one of the largest cities in the entire Asian continent at the time. The city was largely deserted after the invasion by the Chola Tamil Hindu king Rajaraja I in 993 CE and his son Rajendra I in 1014 CE. According to Culavamsa (6th century CE-18th century CE), Anuradhapura was "utterly destroyed in every way by the Chola army. Still, the place was continuously inhabited after this event as indicated by records of visitors to the island such as Robert Knox and others. Thus, the city was the longest-serving Sinhalese capital of Sri Lanka from the 5th century BCE (437 BCE) until the 11th century CE (1017 CE) flourishing for around 1,500 years.

=== Medieval Period and Decline ===
The city's prominence declined following invasions by South Indian dynasties, notably the Chola conquest in 993 CE. Although the political centre shifted to Polonnaruwa, Anuradhapura remained a vital religious site, continuing to attract Buddhist pilgrims.

=== Colonial Restoration and Archaeological Work (10th – early 20th centuries) ===
European interest in Anuradhapura resurged in the 17th century, with accounts from travelers like Robert Knox and John Davy documenting the ruins. In the late 19th century, British colonial authorities initiated archaeological surveys and restoration projects, recognising the site's historical and religious significance.

=== Modern Era and Heritage Conservation (20th century – present) ===
The area was sparsely inhabited for many centuries, but the local population remained aware of the ruins. In Robert Knox's 1681 An Historical Relation of the Island Ceylon, he wrote: "At this City of Anurodgburro is a Watch kept, beyond which are no more people that yield obedience to the King of Kandy". In 1821, John Davy wrote that: "Anooradapoora, so long the capital of Ceylon, is now a small mean village, in the midst of a desert. A large tank, numerous stone pillars, two or three immense tumuli, (probably old dagobahs,) are its principal remains. It is still considered a sacred spot; and is a place of pilgrimage."

=== Sacred City and Colonial-Era Urban Development (Late 19th – mid-20th centuries) ===
By the early 20th century, Anuradhapura was designated as an administrative centre for the North Central Province. With the opening of the Northern Railway line and Anuradhapura Railway Station in 1904, the town gained importance as a transport hub.

In 1949, the Government of Ceylon initiated the Anuradhapura Preservation Plan, developed by Oliver Weerasinghe. Its goal was to protect the ancient city by creating a separate planned township—“New Town”—to the east. Government offices, law courts, and administrative functions were relocated there. The Anuradhapura Preservation Board was established to oversee this transition.

From 1958 to 1962, Nissanka Wijeyeratne served as Government Agent and Chairman of the Preservation Board. He played a pivotal role in overseeing the relocation and development efforts. During his tenure, he unveiled a memorial to H. R. Freeman, a former colonial administrator, and was instrumental in the establishment of the Sacred City, the Anuradhapura Airport, and modern civic infrastructure.

=== Modern Era and Heritage Conservation (Mid-20th century – present) ===
In the mid-20th century, active measures were taken to protect Anuradhapura's ancient sites. These included relocating much of the urban population and administrative infrastructure to the newly developed New Town. In 1982, Anuradhapura was designated a UNESCO World Heritage Site, recognising its archaeological and spiritual significance. Conservation efforts continue to maintain the integrity of religious monuments while managing tourism and pilgrimage activities.

== Buddhism and Cultural Heritage ==
Anuradhapura was a major intellectual centre for early Theravada Buddhism, home to revered Buddhist philosophers including Buddhaghosa.

During the reign of Dhatusena (455-473) a redaction of the Theravada Buddhist canon took place while at the same time 18 new vihara (temple complexes) were built and a statue erected for Mahinda, the Indian prince-monk who introduced Buddhism to the island.

During the late Anuradhapura period, the royal family and nobility of Sri Lanka strongly supported Buddhism. As such, they frequently commissioned works of art and donated these items to Buddhist temples. In return, the temple and local Buddhist community supported the king's rule. Artworks featuring depictions of Avalokitesvara, the Bodhisattva of Mercy and Compassion, became increasingly popular.

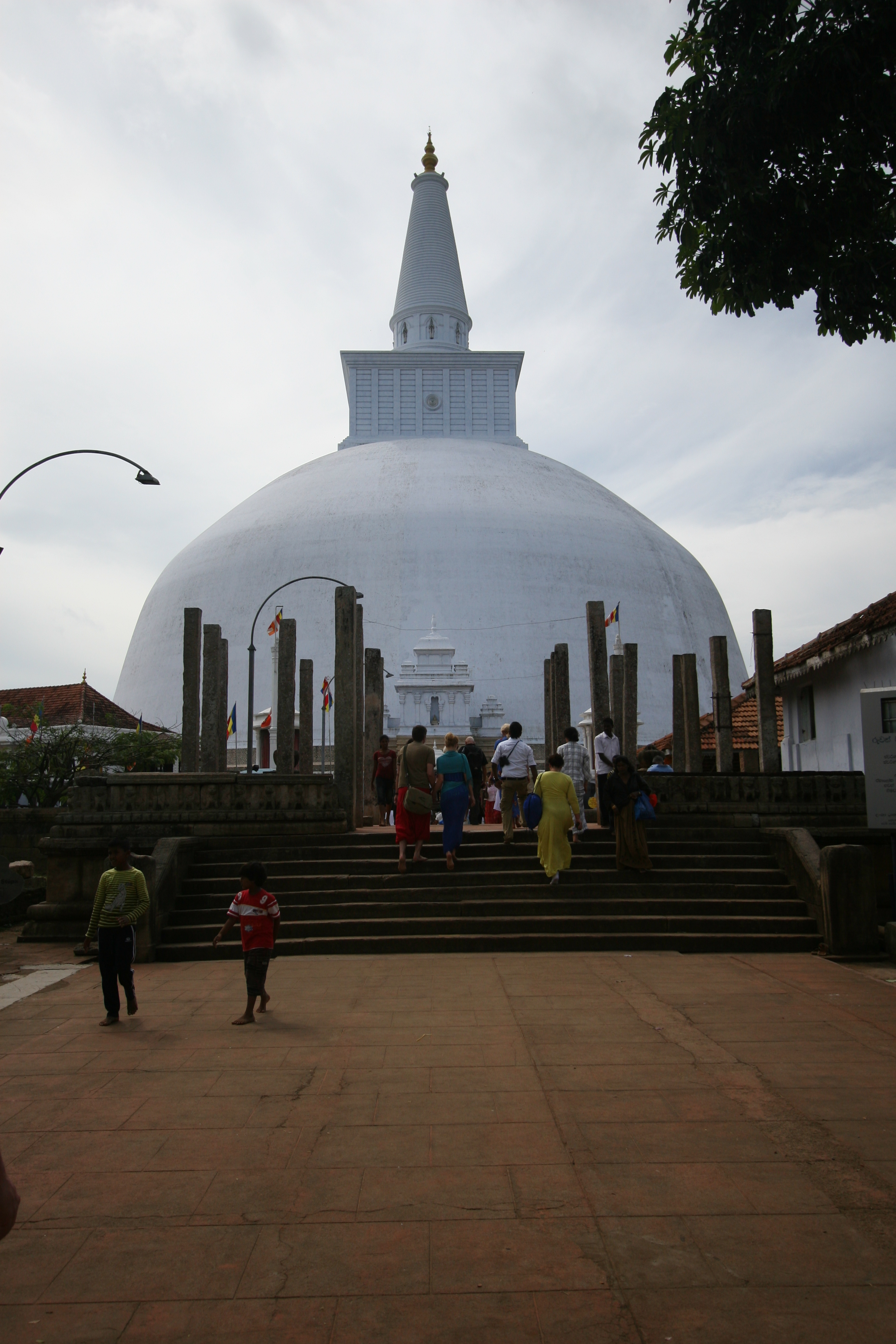
Ruwanwaliseya

=== Sacred city and new town ===
Anuradhapura became the centre of administration of the North Central Province and with the building of the Northern Railway line, Anuradhapura became an important railway town with the opening of the Anuradhapura railway station in 1904. The Government of Ceylon tasked Oliver Weerasinghe to develop the Anuradhapura Preservation Plan in 1949, aimed at establishing a new planned town east of the existing Anuradhapura town, thereby establishing the Sacred city of Anuradhapura, with the aim of preserving the ancient city. The "New Town" had many of the government offices and law courts moved into it. The Anuradhapura Preservation Board was established with this aim.

Nissanka Wijeyeratne was Government Agent of Anuradhapura District from 1958 to 1962. He was a well known government agent of his time. His stature ensured that the voice of Anuradhapura was heard at the highest levels in Colombo. Apart from being Government Agent, he was Chairman of the Anuradhapura Preservation Board. During his period, the city of Anuradhapura was undergoing a historic transition. A new town of Anuradhapura was being built, and the residents of the old city were being transferred to the new town. He was involved in this process of change. While in Anuradhapura, he unveiled a memorial for H. R. Freeman, a popular British Government Agent who later was elected by the people of the district to represent them in the 1st State Council of Ceylon. Anuradhapura was able to see the bigger picture and focus on the key issues, and delegate responsibilities to his staff officers. He was also involved in the development of the Sacred City of Anuradhapura, shifting the urban city to the newly created Anuradhapura town and the establishment of Anuradhapura Airport.

==== Places of veneration ====
- Jaya Sri Maha Bodhi
- Ruwanwelisaya
- Thuparamaya
- Lovamahapaya
- Abhayagiri Dagaba
- Jetavanarama
- Mirisaveti Stupa
- Lankarama

==== Other structures ====
Abhayagiriya Monastery with Samadhi Statue, Kuttam Pokuna (twin pond) and moonstone.

- Dakkhina Stupa
- Isurumuniya
- Kiribath Vehera
- Kuttam Pokuna
- Mahamevnāwa Gardens
- Naka Vihara
- Ranmasu Uyana
- Rathna Prasadaya
- Samadhi Statue
- Sela Cetiya
- Toluvila statue
- Vessagiriya

== Demographics ==
Ethnicity	Population	% Of Total
Sinhalese	66,126	94.82
Sri Lankan Moors	2,953	4.23
Sri Lankan Tamils	506	0.73
Indian Tamils	25	0.04
Other (including Burgher, Malay)	127	0.18
Total	69,737	100

Source: www.statistics.gov.lk - Census 2001

== Climate ==
Anuradhapura has a tropical savanna climate (Köppen As).

Climate data for Anuradhapura (1991–2020)
Month	Jan	Feb	Mar	Apr	May	Jun	Jul	Aug	Sep	Oct	Nov	Dec	Year
Record high °C (°F)	35.0 (95.0)	37.4 (99.3)	39.2 (102.6)	38.9 (102.0)	39.8 (103.6)	36.8 (98.2)	38.1 (100.6)	38.3 (100.9)	38.5 (101.3)	37.3 (99.1)	35.4 (95.7)	33.7 (92.7)	39.8 (103.6)
Mean daily maximum °C (°F)	30.4 (86.7)	32.2 (90.0)	34.8 (94.6)	34.7 (94.5)	33.7 (92.7)	33.2 (91.8)	33.5 (92.3)	33.8 (92.8)	33.9 (93.0)	32.5 (90.5)	30.8 (87.4)	29.8 (85.6)	32.8 (91.0)
Daily mean °C (°F)	26.2 (79.2)	27.2 (81.0)	29.1 (84.4)	29.6 (85.3)	29.5 (85.1)	29.3 (84.7)	29.4 (84.9)	29.4 (84.9)	29.3 (84.7)	28.5 (83.3)	27.1 (80.8)	26.2 (79.2)	28.4 (83.1)
Mean daily minimum °C (°F)	21.8 (71.2)	22.2 (72.0)	23.5 (74.3)	24.6 (76.3)	25.4 (77.7)	25.4 (77.7)	25.2 (77.4)	25.0 (77.0)	24.7 (76.5)	24.0 (75.2)	23.3 (73.9)	22.6 (72.7)	24.0 (75.2)
Record low °C (°F)	17.5 (63.5)	16.6 (61.9)	17.6 (63.7)	21.2 (70.2)	20.5 (68.9)	21.8 (71.2)	22.8 (73.0)	22.3 (72.1)	21.7 (71.1)	20.3 (68.5)	18.4 (65.1)	16.9 (62.4)	16.6 (61.9)
Average precipitation mm (inches)	86.0 (3.39)	60.1 (2.37)	62.1 (2.44)	180.1 (7.09)	93.8 (3.69)	15.4 (0.61)	23.6 (0.93)	42.6 (1.68)	66.5 (2.62)	259.0 (10.20)	281.4 (11.08)	224.6 (8.84)	1,395.2 (54.93)
Average precipitation days (≥ 1.0 mm)	6.4	4.3	5.0	11.0	5.9	2.5	2.5	4.4	5.1	13.8	17.2	12.2	90.4
Source: NOAA

== Transportation ==
Anuradhapura is served by railway and highways. The Northern railway line connects Anuradhapura with Colombo, Jaffna, and Kankesanthurai. Anuradhapura railway station is the city's rail gateway, with major services, such as the Yal Devi, Uttara Devi stopping there.

There are a number of bus routes passing through Anuradhapura from Colombo to the northern province. Some of them are 04, 15, 57, 87 etc.

Anuradhapura is a central city in Sri Lanka. It is directly connected by road to a large number of major cities and towns on the island. By road, it is connected to Vavuniya, Dambulla, Matale, Puttalam, Trincomalee, Jaffna, Kurunegala and Kandy.

== See also ==
- Bassawakkulama reservoir
- Ranmasu Uyana
- Tissa Wewa reservoir
