= Dāṭhāvaṃsa =

Pali Buddhist chronicle

- OpenTipitaka
- Type: Chronicle
- Composition: 13th century
- Attribution: Dhammakitti

Dāṭhāvaṃsa (also known as the Dāṭhavaṃsa, Dhātuvansa, Dantadhātu, or Dantadhātuvaṇṇanā) is a Pali chronicle attributed to Dhammakitti Thero. It is sometimes titled in English as "The History of the Tooth Relic" and contains histories and popular traditions associated with the Relic of the tooth of the Buddha. This relic is currently enshrined at the Temple of the Tooth in Kandy, Sri Lanka.

== Origins and historical significance ==
According to its introduction, the Dāṭhāvaṃsa is a translation of an earlier Sinhalese text that dates to when the relic first arrived in Sri Lank during the reign of Sirimeghavanna of Anuradhapura in the 3rd–4th century CE. The Dāṭhāvaṃsa provides a great deal of detail regarding conflicts between Buddhists and Brahmins in the 3rd century which, if the putative origin of the Sinhala precursor are true, would have been derived from contemporary sources and witnesses.

George Turnour claimed that this Sinhala text still existed in the 19th century, which would have made it the earliest surviving Sinhala historical text, but it is currently considered to be lost. The first verse of the Dāṭhāvaṃsa gives this original the title Dalada-vamsa, composed in Elu, and this may by synonymous with a work called the Datha-dhatu-vamsa in the Culavamsa that extended the story of the Tooth Relic into the 18th century.

== Contents ==
Like the Mahabodhivamsa and Mahavamsa, the Dāṭhāvaṃsa begins with the penultimate rebirth of Gautama Buddha during the lifetime of Dipankara Buddha, and then relates the life of Gautama Buddha up until his paranirvana and the distribution of his relics. It consists of six chapters composed in five different metres, with additional variations in metre employed for the concluding verses of some chapters.

Within the text its author is identified as Dhammakitti, and that it was written at the suggestion of General Parakrama, responsible for enthroning Lilavati of Polonnaruwa, both of whom are praised within the text. The death of Lilavati's husband, Parakramabahu I, and her subsequent reign are described in the Culavamsa and dated to around AD 1211, suggesting that the Dāṭhāvaṃsa was composed in the early 13th century. Dhammakitti is identified as a direct pupil of Sāriputta Thera, and his writings are significant in identifying texts attributed to his teacher. Dhammakitti also identifies himself as a 'rajaguru', or royal preceptor, in a Sinhalese paraphrase of the Dāṭhāvaṃsa that he authored for the benefit of those not fluent in Pali.

The Dāṭhāvaṃsa is praised by scholars for its literary merit- both the skill and rhythm with which its varying metres are employed, and the relative simplicity and elegance of its diction.
