= Daladavamsa =

Lost Sinhala religious chronicle

The Daladavamsa is a lost Sinhala religious chronicle composed in Elu. It relates the story of the arrival of the Relic of the tooth of the Buddha in Sri Lanka and is said to have been composed shortly after the 3rd century. It is the source text of the Dāṭhavaṃsa, a Pali text likely composed in the 13th century CE.

Under the title Datha-dhatu-vamsa, mentioned in the Culavamsa, it may have been extended by subsequent authors to cover the story of the Tooth Relic into the 18th century. George Turnour claimed that this Sinhala text was still around in the 19th century, which would have made it the earliest surviving Sri Lankan historical text, but no copies are known to exist and it is now considered to be lost.

According to Datha-dhatu-vamsa, as mentioned in Culavamsa, Buddha's left canine tooth was handed over to Brahmadatta by a disciple, which eventually gave rise to dissensions between the kings of Kalinga and Pataliputra in the 3rd century CE, and the tooth relic was shifted to Sri Lanka by weighing anchor in Tamralipta. According to Ganguly, it is absurd to imagine that the prince chose the furthest harbor from the capital even though there were intermediate harbors from which it would have been easier to set out on his voyage.
