= Genealogical Claims of Jaffna =

The researcher into genealogy in Sri Lanka (as in the rest of the Indian subcontinent) faces a significant problem due to the lack of reliable source material. Unlike in the West, where there has been a long tradition of documenting genealogical data (i.e.: births, marriages and deaths) from very early times, in Sri Lanka it is only after the advent of the Portuguese that such information was recorded systematically in the parish records. These records were destroyed by the Portuguese to prevent it from falling into the hands of the advancing Dutch Army.

In Sri Lanka, as in the Indian sub-continent, genealogical information was maintained and passed down by oral tradition prior to the advent of the colonial powers. Even the Hindu religious teachings such as the Vedas have been passed down the centuries from father to son by word of mouth. In Jaffna, genealogical information about prominent families were also traditionally maintained by the Paraiyar community (the drummer caste).

The feudal structure, which was largely intact until the 1950s and 1960s, has disappeared hastened by the ethnic conflict. Village communities including the "Paraiyars" have dispersed from their native villages, taking with them their knowledge of the local genealogies. Information that had been committed to writing was on perishable material, and hence very little if any has survived the ravages of time. Official documents have also been lost in the destruction caused by the civil war.

== Sri Lanka's documented history ==
- The Early Period – Unlike her neighbors, Sri Lanka has a well documented history from ancient times to the Middle Ages. The following ancient Chronicles tell the story of Sri Lanka:
- The Dipavamsa, or "Deepavamsa", (Chronicle of the Island), Written in the "Pali" language is the oldest historical record of Sri Lanka. The chronicle is believed to be compiled from Atthakatha, and other sources around the 3rd and 4th century. Together with Mahavamsa, it is the source of many accounts of ancient history of Sri Lanka and India. It was set down, not as a history of Sri Lanka, but as a document which covers the advent and spread of Buddhism in the Island. The work has been translated into English by B. C. Law. It is believed to have been authored by several Buddhist monks of the Mahavihara tradition of Anuradhapura, in the 3rd and 4th centuries.
- The Mahavamsa ("Great Chronicle") a historical poem also written in the "Pali" language, gives an account of the kings of Sri Lanka. It covers the period from the coming of Prince Vijaya of Kalinga (ancient Orissa) in 543 BC to the reign of King Mahasena (334–361 AD). The first printed edition an English translation of the Mahavamsa was published in 1837 by George Turnour. A German translation of Mahavamsa was completed by Wilhelm Geiger in 1912. This was then translated into English by Mabel Haynes Bode, and subsequently revised by Geiger.
- The Cūḷavaṃsa, or Chulavamsa, (Lesser Chronicle) is a historical record, written in the "Pāli" language, of the kings of Sri Lanka. It covers the period from the 4th century to 1815. The Culavamsa was compiled over many years, by Sinhalese Buddhist monks. It is generally considered to be a sequel to the Mahavamsa ("Great Chronicle") as it was written in the 6th century by the monk Mahanama. The Mahavamsa and the Culavamsa are sometimes thought of as a single work (referred to as the "Mahavamsa") spanning over two millennia of Sri Lankan history.

The Mahavamsa, the Deepavamsa and the Culavamsa were all authored by Buddhist monks, and were written not as an accurate account of the history of the country, but, to highlight the importance of Buddhism within the historical panorama of events of the time. They record the public history of the period capturing the events that illustrate the pride of place afforded to Buddhism. Sadly no mention is made of the personal details of individuals, not even those of the various Kings who ruled Sri Lanka.

== The documented history of Jaffna – the Yalpana Vypava Malai, and the historical works that predated it ==
The Deepavamsa, Mahavamsa and Chulavamsa which chronicle the early history of Sri Lanka make very little reference to the Northern region of the country. The history of the Jaffna Peninsula and the Vanni region was for the first time documented during the Dutch period, when Jan Maccara commissioned Mylvagana Pulavar of Mathakal to set down the history, and oral traditions of the area. The outcome was the "Yalpana Vaipava Malai", which is based on the following ancient publications.

1. Kailaya Malai
2. Vaiya Padal
3. Raja Murai
4. Pararajasekharan Ula

"The author says that he referred the books Kailaya Malai, Vaiyai Padal and Pararajasekaran Ula for his work. It is said that these books are composed not earlier than the fourteenth Century A. D., contain folklore; legends and myths mixed with historical anecdotes. Today, except the Kailaya Malai which has been printed, and a few manuscript copies of Vaiya Padal, the other works are very rare and hardly procurable."

Mylvaganam was a poet, and not a scholar who had been trained in the discipline of historical research. Hence the Vaipava Malai like the Mahawamsa, though containing many historical truths and traditions cannot be accepted in its entirety. Not only are there chronological errors, especially when narrating the last phase of the Tamil kingdom, but there seems to be some confusion regarding historical personages being referred to therein. At times the author has even taken liberties with history, and has created his own stories to establish certain traditional beliefs.

The Yalpana Vypava Malai which lay forgotten during the early British occupation was discovered and translated into English by C. Brito and first published in English in 1879. This was followed by some reprints in Tamil, the best known was a reprint in Tamil edited by Mudaliyar Kula Sabanathan which appeared in 1953.

== Available source material for genealogical studies ==
Although the island has a well document history, based on the afore mentioned chronicles, and ancient inscriptions, covering a period of twenty three centuries, the oldest archives extant in Sri Lanka date back only to the 16th century. The archives of the Sri Lankan monarchy if any have been lost to posterity.

=== The Portuguese period (1505–1658) ===
The Portuguese, who ruled Sri Lanka from 1506 to 1638 AD, made use of the indigenous land records relating to the maritime districts under their control, which formed the basis of their "Thombus" and "Forals" (quit-rent registers.) These Thombus later became the foundation of their revenue collection and also an important collection of the archives. Under the Portuguese, Vendor da Fazenda (Superintendent of Revenue) acted as the archivist, by preserving the Thombus, and also was responsible to keep them up to date.

When the Portuguese possessions in the island were attacked by the Dutch in 1640 AD, a majority of the records were destroyed to prevent them from falling into enemy hands. Accordingly, there are no original source materials preserved in the National Archives to study the Portuguese period of Sri Lanka. There are a few copies of the Portuguese Thombus and Forals for the years 1614 and 1618 on microfilm that have been obtained from Lisbon, and now available in the local archives, as well as some scholarly works by Sri Lankans who have used the primary sources in Lisbon and written comprehensive thesis on the Portuguese period in the history of Sri Lanka.

=== The Dutch period (1656–1796) ===
Dutch archival material covers the period starting 1640 AD up to 1796, and gives a researcher an in-depth knowledge of the political, economical, social and cultural aspects of that era. They are a continuous series of important primary sources for the study of the history of Sri Lanka.

Some important sources of information during the Dutch period include:

- Registration of land – The Land Thombu records the lands belonging to each family. They were classified according to Korales, Pattuwas and Villages. All the lands were assessed based on fertility.
- Registration of births marriages and deaths – The Hoofd Thombu or Head Thombu is a genealogical register of the proprietors of the land distributed in the corresponding Land Thombu. It was called the head thombu because in each case names are tabulated under a head or representative of a family.
- Appointment of native headmen – The Dutch like the Portuguese before them recognised the value of maintaining the ancient system of 'tenure' prevalent during the times of the Native Kings. Accordingly, property, within the conquered areas were held at the will of the Dutch East India Company as lord paramount. Entire villages were settled on the headman who as a rule were paid no salaries, but were due the rights and dues usually rendered by the village community to the headman. Such grants of land were recorded in deeds of accomodessa which, are a valuable source of information as they also list down the majoraals or the husbandmen working under each village headman.
- Diaries of governors and commanders – Many of the Dutch governors of Ceylon have left behind their memoirs, and some have even spent much time meticulously preparing handing over notes for their successors. Many of these notes, journals and diaries give great insight into the traditions and social structures prevalent at the time. An example is the succession note left by Dutch governor Van Imhoff where he outlines the evils of the 'tenure' system and advocates a move to a more progressive system which could eliminate the office of the village chieftain. This new system was implemented approx 100 years into the Dutch rule of the island.

Much of the registries used during the Dutch period were preserved and improved on during the British period in the history of the country.

=== The British period (1796–1948) ===
The British who captured the island from the Dutch in 1796, developed a modern records and archives management system. Clause four (4) of the articles of capitulation, emphatically expressed that all public papers should be faithfully delivered over. During the early British period the Colonial Chief Secretary of the British administration was the custodian of official records. In 1803 the post was named "Keeper of the Dutch records". In the year 1902, the post of archivist was created and all the archives throughout the country were placed in his care. In 1947, the post of Government Department Archivist was established.

When the British first conquered the maritime provinces of Sri Lanka, administration of the lands within their control were managed through the East India Company. By the early 1830s, the British had almost finished consolidating their position in Sri Lanka, and began to take more of an interest in securing the island's political stability, and economic profitability. A new wave of thought, influenced by the reformist political ideology articulated by Jeremy Bentham and James Mill, promised to change fundamentally Britain's relationship to its colonies.

Known as utilitarianism, and later as philosophical radicalism, it promoted the idea of democracy and individual liberty. This philosophy sponsored the idea of the trusteeship, i.e., that new territories would be considered trusts, and would receive all the benefits of British liberalism. These philosophical abstractions were put into practical use with the recommendations of a commission, led by W.M.G. Colebrooke and C.H. Cameron. Their Colebrooke Report (1831–32) was an important document in the history of the island. G.C. Mendis, considered by many to be the doyen of modern Sri Lankan history, considers the Colebrooke-Cameron reforms to be the dividing line between the past and present in Sri Lanka.

One part of these reforms were the setting up of the Ceylon Civil Services, which ensured a more structured and planned approach to recording demographic events including:

- Registration of Births and Deaths – As the population, especially in the Maritime provinces grew exponentially during the British occupation of Sri Lanka, the British established administrative offices in the key cities and towns and ensured that all births and deaths were recorded and registered, while certificates were issued as proof that the incident had been officially recorded. In Sri Lanka, a system of registration of vital events i.e. births, deaths and marriages has been in existence since 1867, when the Department of Registration of Births, Deaths and Marriages was established, following which registration of deaths and births was made compulsory in 1897.
- Registration of Land transactions – Under British rule, there were significant changes to land ownership policies. During the early part of British rule, the policies concentrated on the provision of larger tracts of land, for plantations of cinnamon, coffee, tea, rubber and coconuts. This influenced to a large extent the changes to the traditional policies and attitudes to land. In 1840, enactment of the Crown Lands (Encroachment) Ordinance was a landmark event. Under that ordinance all waste lands in the country such as forests and chena (shifting cultivation), uncultivated and unoccupied lands were presumed to be property of the crown, unless proved otherwise. This ensured the availability of crown lands for the British investors for plantations. The first significant legislation to attempt introduction of title registration in Sri Lanka was enacted in 1863. It did not lead to the full registration of titles as envisaged by the government of the day. Unfortunately, as a temporary measure, the government allowed the adoption of the registration of deeds, which is still in place today and is entrenched in the laws of Sri Lanka.
- Parish and School records –The British governor Robert Browning, who took office in 1812, played a key role in establishing many missionary schools especially in the Maritime provinces of the island. He was also a key influence in setting up mission churches and parishes and converting the natives to Christianity. As parishes and missionary schools grew, they began to record information about parishioners and students enrolled, and thus a huge repository of information was built, which become and excellent source of genealogical information.
- Another excellent source of information are the diaries of the government agents and the governors as well as the many commission reports which dotted the British occupation of Sri Lanka.

Documentation and capture of information during the British period in Sri Lanka was initially a continuation of the practises established by the Dutch. However, the British improved the civil administration of the country and thus the capture and documentation of information.

== Subsequent publications on the history of Jaffna ==
There was a renewed interest in the history of Jaffna in the late 19th and the early 20th centuries, which resulted in a host of publications. Notable among them were "Ancient Jaffna" by Mudaliyar Rasanayagam and works titled "History of Jaffna" by S. John, and by Mootha Tambipillai. These works were based mainly on the Vaipava Malai. Other works include "Notes on Jaffna" by John H. Martyn, the many publications by the two outstanding scholars of that period Fr. Gnanaprakasar and Sir Paul E. Peiris. There have been many recent publications on the archaeology and history of the Jaffna peninsula as well. Those worthy of mention include publications by Dr Ragupathy, Dr. Indrapala, and Prof. Pathmanathan, which give greater insight into the history of the Jaffna peninsula. However the twilight years of the Ariya Chakravarti rule, prior to the Portuguese conquest of the Kingdom still remain unclear and hazy.

=== Publications on the genealogy of Jaffna families ===
The discovery and publication of the Yalpana Vaipaya Malai, at the turn of the 19th century also sparked off an interest in genealogy for some of the Tamil families. Many families were keen to trace their roots as far back as they could. Some of these genealogies were printed for limited private circulation.

Most of these publications were not researched by independent authorities, nor have they been substantiated by any documentary, or historical evidence. Many of these seem to be attempts by families to aggrandise the lineage.

Of the books so published one of the best known and best researched was the "Maniyam Pathiyar Santhathi Murai"(the genealogies of the inhabitants of the village of Manipay) by the late T. Vinasithamby. The author was a paternal uncle of the scholar, and theologian the late Dr Isaac Thambiah, who had married Mangalanayagam, daughter of the late Mudaliyar J. W. Barr-Kumarakulasinghe.

In his book he has traced the genealogies of some of the families living in Manipaye during his time to the Dutch period. Some of the families mentioned in the book even have their origins outside the village of Manipay. This yet again substantiates the fact that accurate, independent documentary evidence is available only up to the Dutch period.

"Maniyam Pathiyar Santhathi Murai" does not make any claims about the caste superiority or lineage of the families mentioned therein, nor does it claim any special status for the village of Manipay.

In sharp contrast to the "Maniyam Pathiyar Santhathi Murai" which is a well researched publication, is the "Yalpana Vaipava Kaumudhi" by a poet Kallady Vellupillai. A major part of the book covers the history of Jaffna and is based on the "Yaplana Vaipava Malai". Another section covers the genealogy of some of the Jaffna Tamil families of his time. It was current knowledge at the time that the ancestry published in this work depended on the size of the contribution made by the respective families, to the author. Another unreliable work that was published in 1930 was the book titled Mel Makkal Charithiram (the genealogies of some eminent Tamil gentlemen of Ceylon) By Pandit Ratnaswami Iyar. This like the well known publication 20th Century Impressions was a book written as a business venture, where the objective of the author was to collect contributions from the various individuals whose genealogies the work contained. Information that was published was received from the individuals concerned and published without any research or efforts to substantiate the claims made by them. In fact the author has attributed Royal lineage to his patroness which is not even substantiated in the publication, and many of the individuals mentioned in this book were members of his patroness's extended family who were wealthy merchants well established in Colombo. These included many guaranteed Shroffs, brokers and Merchants.

== The Paraiyar caste as repositories of genealogical Information ==
As mentioned earlier, the genealogies of the prominent families of Jaffna were known to the "Paraiyar" community (drummer caste) of the respective villages from where the families originated, since they were the repositories of such information. During important festivals and family rituals, it was customary for members of this caste to visit the "valavus" (the manor houses) of their Ejamans (overlords), to beg for alms. They would greet the head of the household by addressing him by his family's ancestral mudali name, followed by the words "Namo! Namo!" (hail! Hail!).

Family genealogies were referred to at weddings and at funerals. At a Hindu wedding, during the recitation of the Koththiram (lineage), the officiating priest would proclaim three generations of the genealogy of the bridal couple. At Hindu Funerals it was customary to publish a document referred to as a Kalvettu, giving the genealogy of the deceased. Information for these purposes were most often obtained from the Paraiyar community.

It also interesting to note that in Kalvettus most families whatever their cast and origins were would claim descent from the Cheras, Cholas, Pandyas or the Kings of Jaffna!!!

== See also ==
- List of current pretenders
- Thanjavur Nayak kingdom
- Sri Lankan Tamil people
- Aryacakravarti dynasty
