= Jaya Sri Maha Bodhi =

Sacred tree in Anuradhapura, Sri Lanka

Jaya Sri Maha Bodhi ජය ශ්‍රී මහා බෝධිය
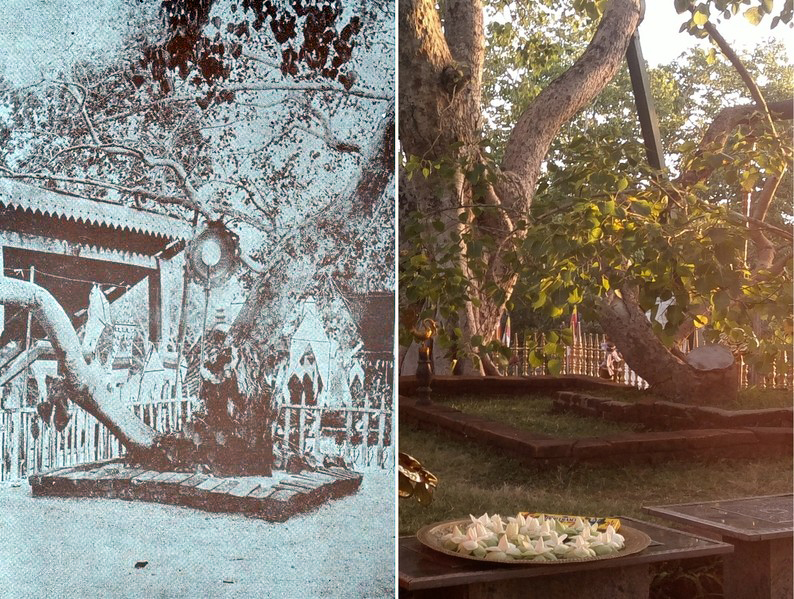
- Sacred Bodhi before c. 1913 and in the recent past
- Interactive map of Jaya Sri Maha Bodhi ජය ශ්‍රී මහා බෝධිය
- Species: Bodhi (Ficus religiosa)
- Location: Anuradhapura, Sri Lanka
- Coordinates: 8°20′41″N 80°23′48″E
- Date seeded: 236 BC (planted)

Designations

Archaeological Protected Monument of Sri Lanka

UNESCO World Heritage Site
- Official name: Jaya Sri Maha Bodhi Tree, Sacred City of Anuradhapura
- Criteria: Cultural: ii, iii, vi
- Reference: 200
- Inscription: 1982 (6th Session)

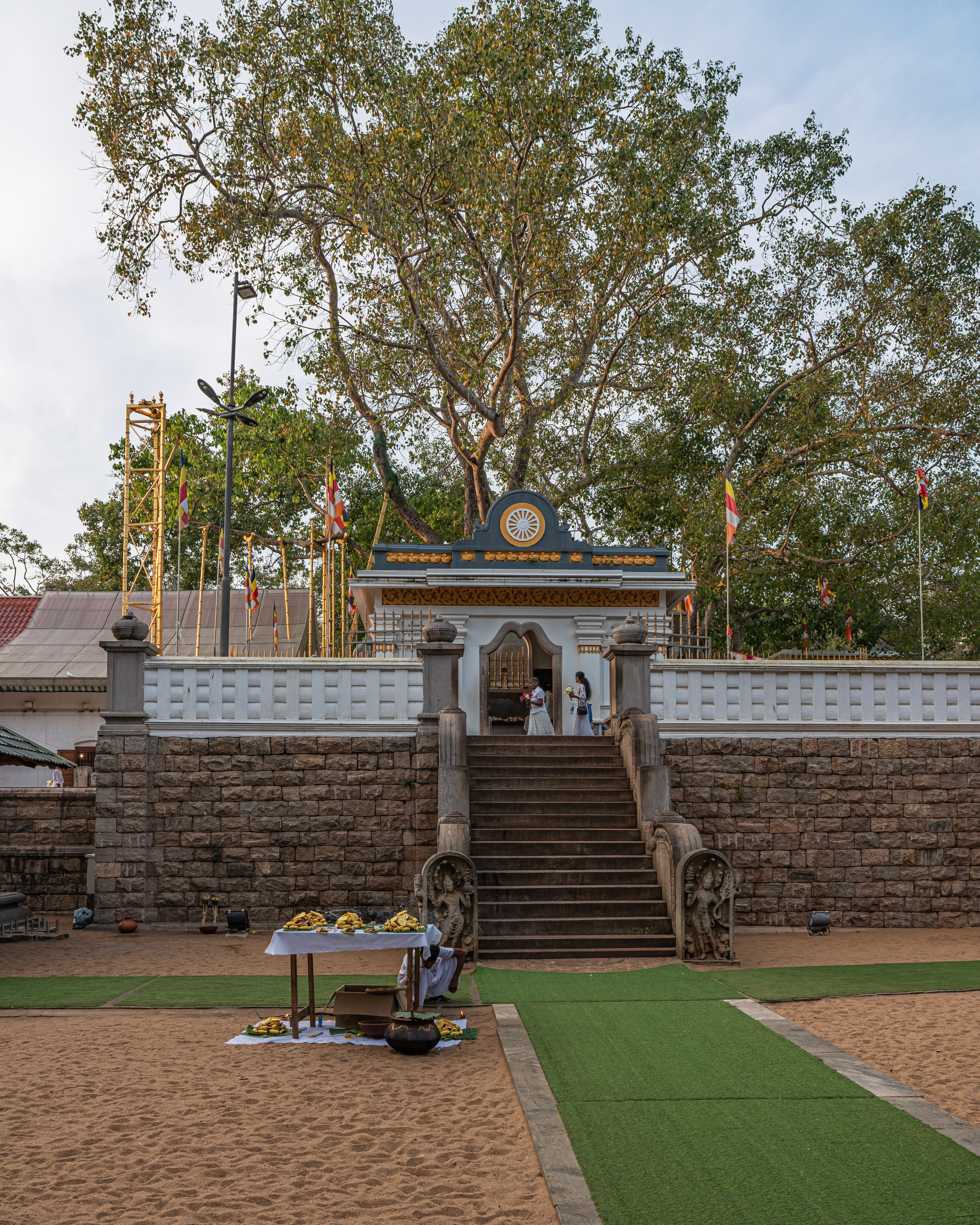
Jaya Sri Maha Bodhi in 2020.

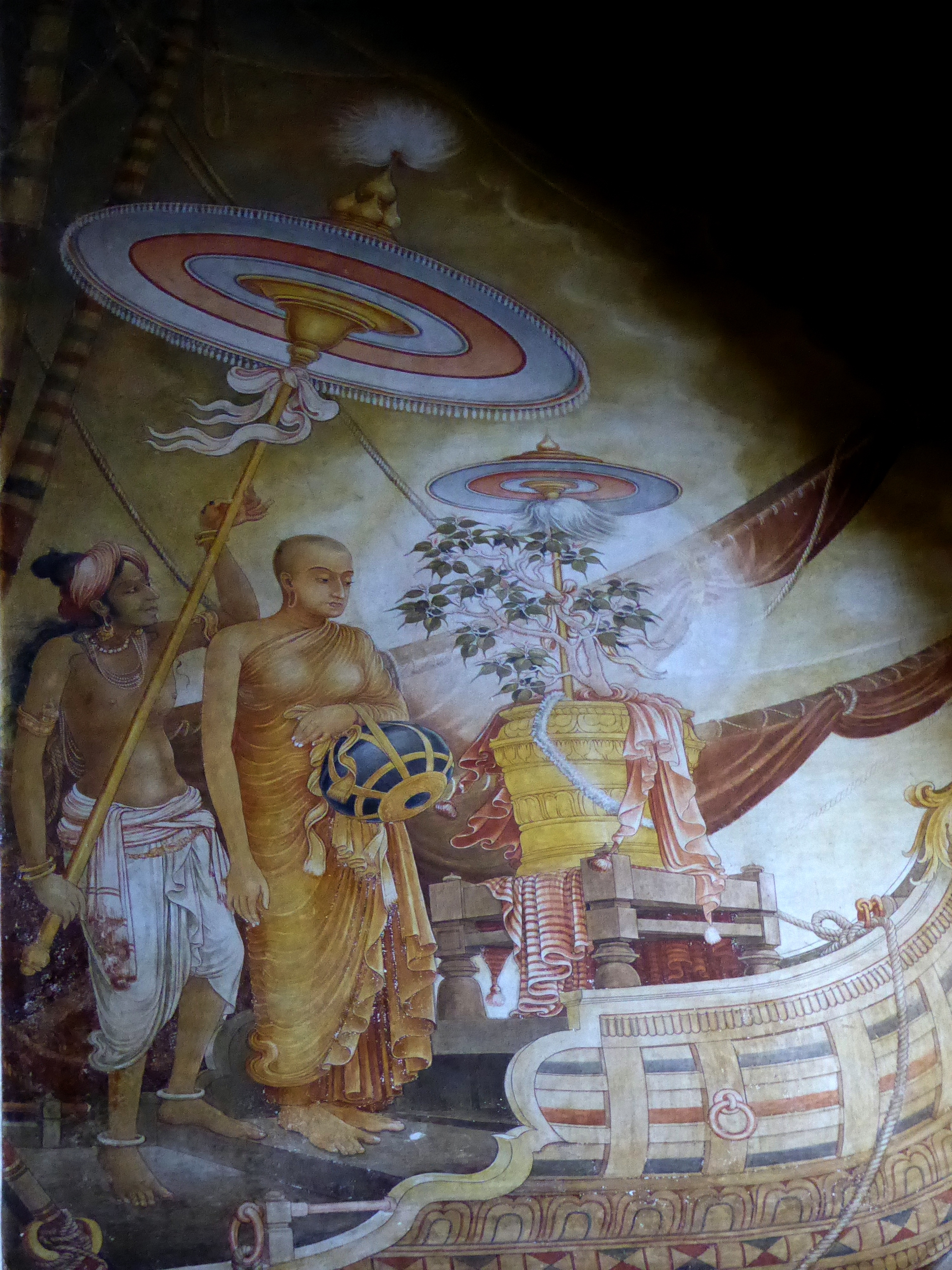
A wall Painting the Aluth Vihara Ge or the New Image House at Kelaniya Temple, Sri Lanka. Sangamitta Maha Theri bringing the sapling of the Sri Maha Bodhi to Sri Lanka. Wall painting by Solias Mendis. The murals are those of the 18th century and the early 20th century.

The Jaya Sri Maha Bodhi is a sacred Bo tree (Ficus religiosa) located in the Mahamewuna Garden, within the historic UNESCO World Heritage City of Anuradhapura, Sri Lanka. It is believed to be a tree grown from a cutting of the southern branch from the historical sacred bo tree, the Bodhi tree, which was destroyed during the time of Emperor Ashoka, at Bodh Gaya in India, under which Siddhartha Gautama (the Buddha) is believed to have attained enlightenment. In 236 BC, according to Sri Lankan tradition, the Buddhist nun Sangamitta, a daughter of Ashoka, brought the tree cutting to Sri Lanka during the reign of Sinhalese King Devanampiya Tissa.^{[1]} At more than 2,300 years old, it is the oldest living human-planted tree in the world with a known planting date. The Mahāvaṃsa, or the great chronicle of the Sinhalese, provides an elaborate account of the establishment of the Jaya Sri Maha Bodhi on the Island and the subsequent development of the site as a major Buddhist pilgrimage site.

Today, the Jaya Sri Maha Bodhi is situated on a high terrace, about 6.5 meters above the ground, and surrounded by 4 other lower-level terraces with Bo trees called "Parivara Bodhi" planted for its protection. The site is currently administered by the Chief High Priest of Atamasthana and the Atamasthana Palakasabha, the administrative body of the Atamasthana. It receives millions of pilgrims each year. The site is open to visitors and continuously hosts numerous acts of worship throughout the year. However, access to the uppermost terrace where the bo tree is located is restricted due to the old age of the tree and various acts of vandalism it has endured throughout history, including a terrorist attack by the LTTE in 1985, where around 146 pilgrims were massacred.

== History ==
=== 588 BCE: Connection with Buddha's nirvana in India ===
The Jaya Sri Maha Bodhi is a sacred Bo tree that stands in the Mahamewna Gardens in Anuradhapura, Sri Lanka. According to Buddhist tradition, about 2,600 years ago, the Buddha sat with his back against an Esathu (Aśvattha) tree on the banks of the Neranjana River in Bodh Gaya, India, under which he achieved enlightenment. In doing so, the tree gained a venerated status. It became known as the Bodhi tree, and pilgrims came to see it even within the lifetime of the Buddha.

=== 288 BC: Planting of the cutting in Sri Lanka ===
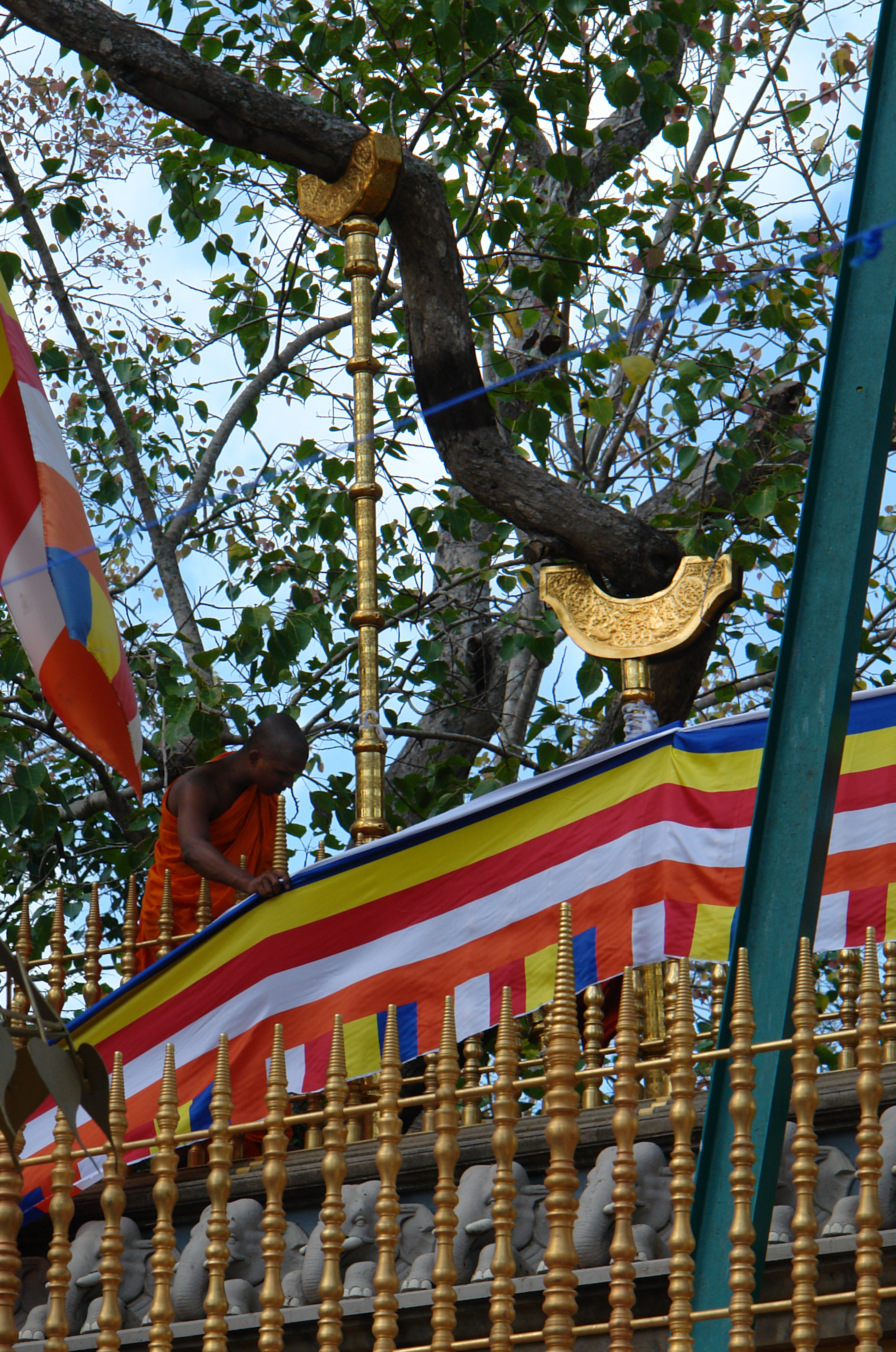
A Photo taken from the Lower Compound, Pahatha Maluwa.

In the 3rd century BC, a southern branch of the original sacred fig under which Buddha obtained nirvana in India was brought to Sri Lanka by Sangamitta Theri (Pali; Skt.: Sanghamitra), the daughter of Emperor Asoka and founder of an order of Buddhist nuns in Sri Lanka. In 288 BC, this branch was ceremoniously presented to Devanampiya Tissa, one of the earliest kings of Sri Lanka whose reign was notable for the arrival of Buddhism, who Tissa planted the branch of the Bodhi tree in his Royal Park in Anuradhapura on a high terrace about 6.5 m (21.3 ft) above the ground in the Mahamevnāwa Park in Anuradhapura and surrounded by railings.

=== Protective additions by later kings and others ===
Several ancient kings have contributed in developing this religious site. King Vasabha (65–107 AD) placed four Buddha statues in four side of the sacred tree. King Voharika Tissa (214–236 AD) added metallic statues. King Mahanaga (569–571 AD) constructed a water canal around the sacred tree and King Sena II (846–866 AD) renovated it.

The present wall was constructed by Ilupandeniye Athtadassi Thero during the reign of King Kirti Sri Rajasinha (r. 1747–1782), to protect it from wild elephants which might have damaged the tree. The height of the wall is 10 ft (3.0 m); and 5 ft (1.5 m) in thickness; its length from north to south is 388 ft (118.3 m) and from east to west 274 ft (83.5 m).

The first golden fence around the sacred tree was constructed by some Buddhist followers in Anuradhapura under the guidance of Yatirawana Narada Thero in 1969. The iron fence below the above golden fence was created by people of Anuradhapura under the guidance of Yagirala Pannananda Thero.

The Jaya Sri Maha Bodhi, as it became known, has since been cared for and protected by Buddhist monks and dedicated kings. Statues, water canals, golden fences, and walls have been built around the tree over the centuries, and many vows and offerings have been made by Buddhists at the foot of the sacred fig.

=== Threats and incidents ===
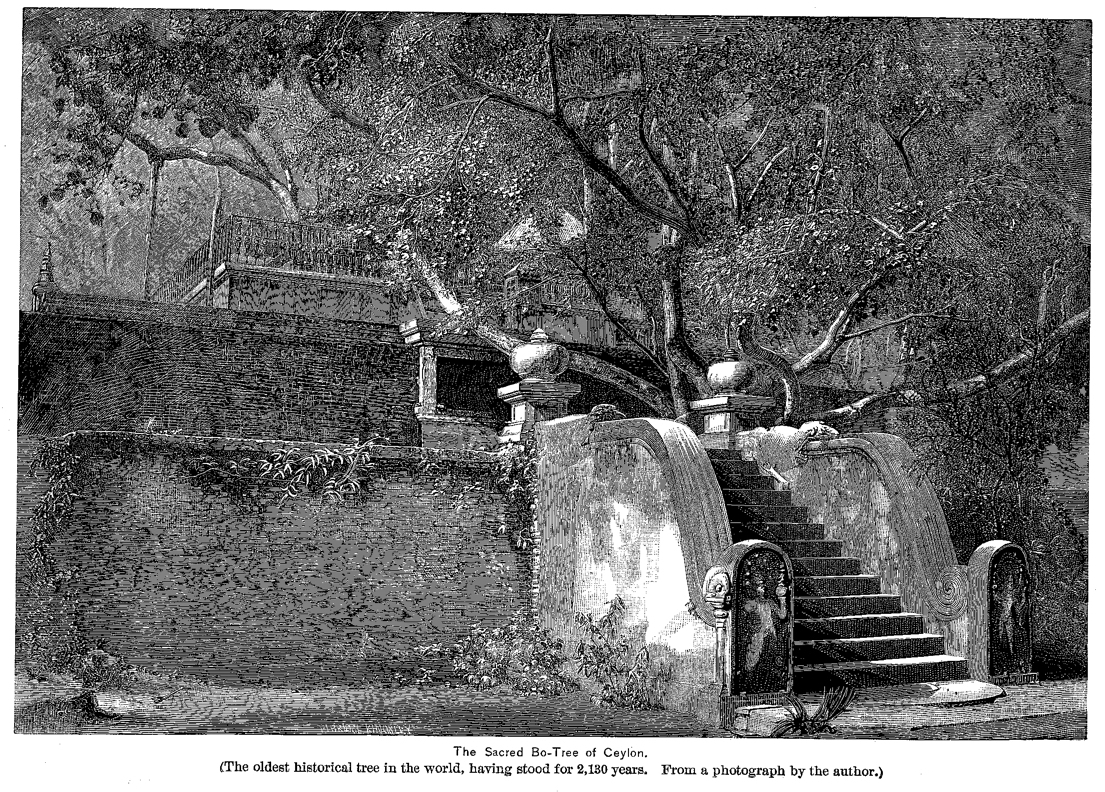
Jaya Sri Maha Bodhi in 1891.

At times the tree has faced serious threats, and not only from wild elephants. Two branches of the sacred tree were broken during separate storms in 1907 and 1911. An individual called Katuwawala Jamis, cut down a branch in 1929. Liberation Tigers of Tamil Eelam shot and massacred a number of Sinhalese-Buddhists on the upper terrace in 1985. This incident is known as the Anuradhapura massacre.

=== Custodianship Change ===
As of May 2026, Ven. Hemarathana, the previous custodian of the focus was removed of that role due to charges of sexual abuse of an 11 year old girl in 2022. The decision was made by The Council of Monks of the Malwatte Chapter and is considered a rare disciplinary move by that council.

== Religious significance ==
=== Pilgrimage ===
On the island, Buddhists continue to honor a longstanding tradition of visiting and paying homage to the sacred Bodhi tree. Every year, pilgrims from remote areas travel to the city of Anuradhapura to pay their respects to the Sri Maha Bodhi, a site of immense spiritual significance. The site is maintained with care, and daily offerings are provided by its custodian.

=== Religious offerings ===
Today, many Buddhists believe that making offerings to the Jaya Sri Maha Bodhi can bring about meaningful and positive changes in their lives. Devotees often make special vows at the shrine, seeking blessings for safe childbirth and healing from various ailments.

Farmers in the Anuradhapura region also uphold the tradition of presenting rice from their first paddy harvest to the Sri Maha Bodhi tree. This practice is rooted in the belief that such offerings help ensure a successful harvest, reducing the impact of challenges like drought, pest infestations, and even damage from wildlife, such as elephants.

== Other attractions in the complex ==
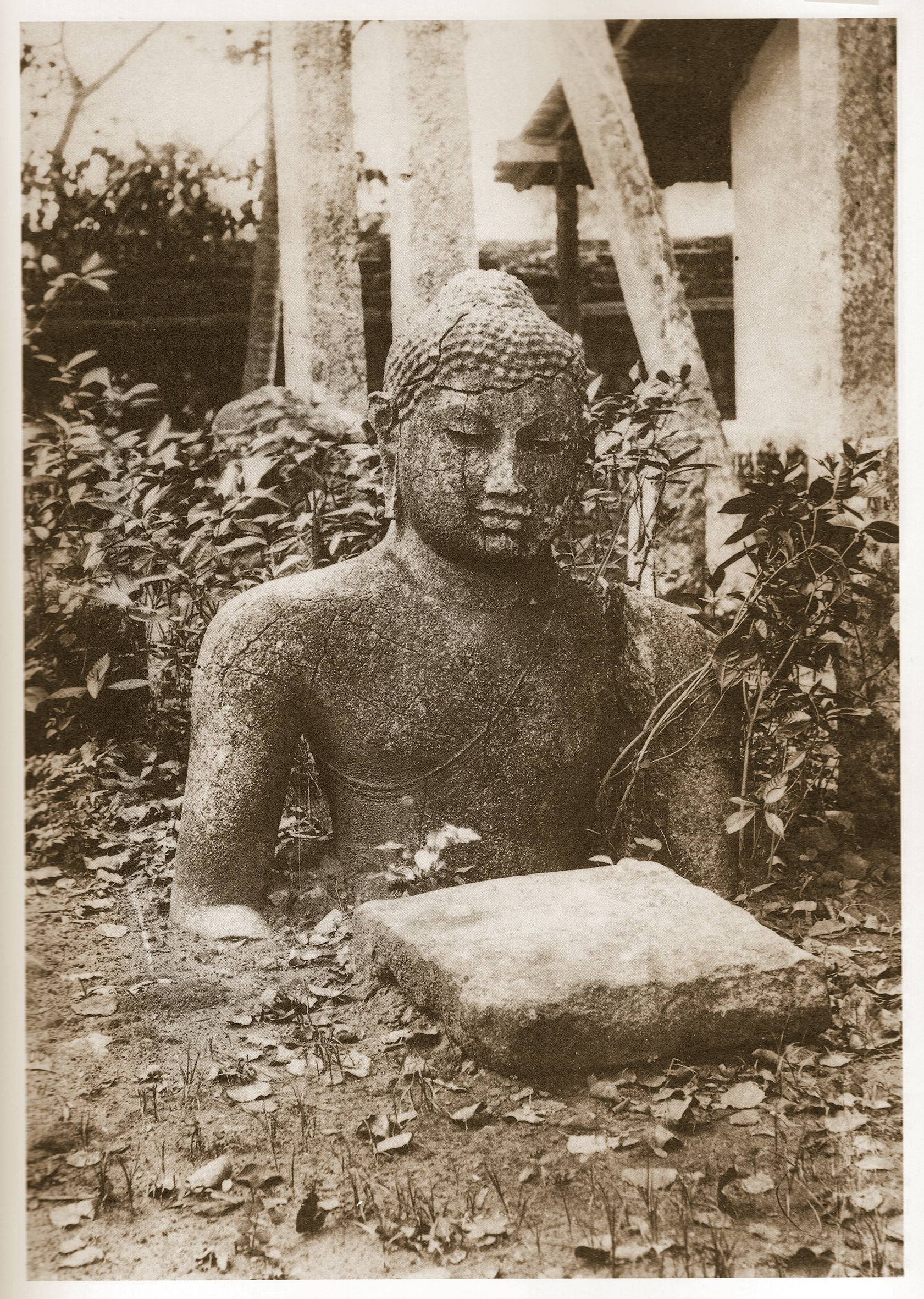
Buddha Śākyamuni. Dolomite marble. Height: 3.3 meters. Late Anurādhapura Period, circa 6th century. Śrī Mahā Bodhi Shrine at the Mahāvihāra complex at Anurādhapura. (Photo: Captain J. R. Hogg, 1895.)

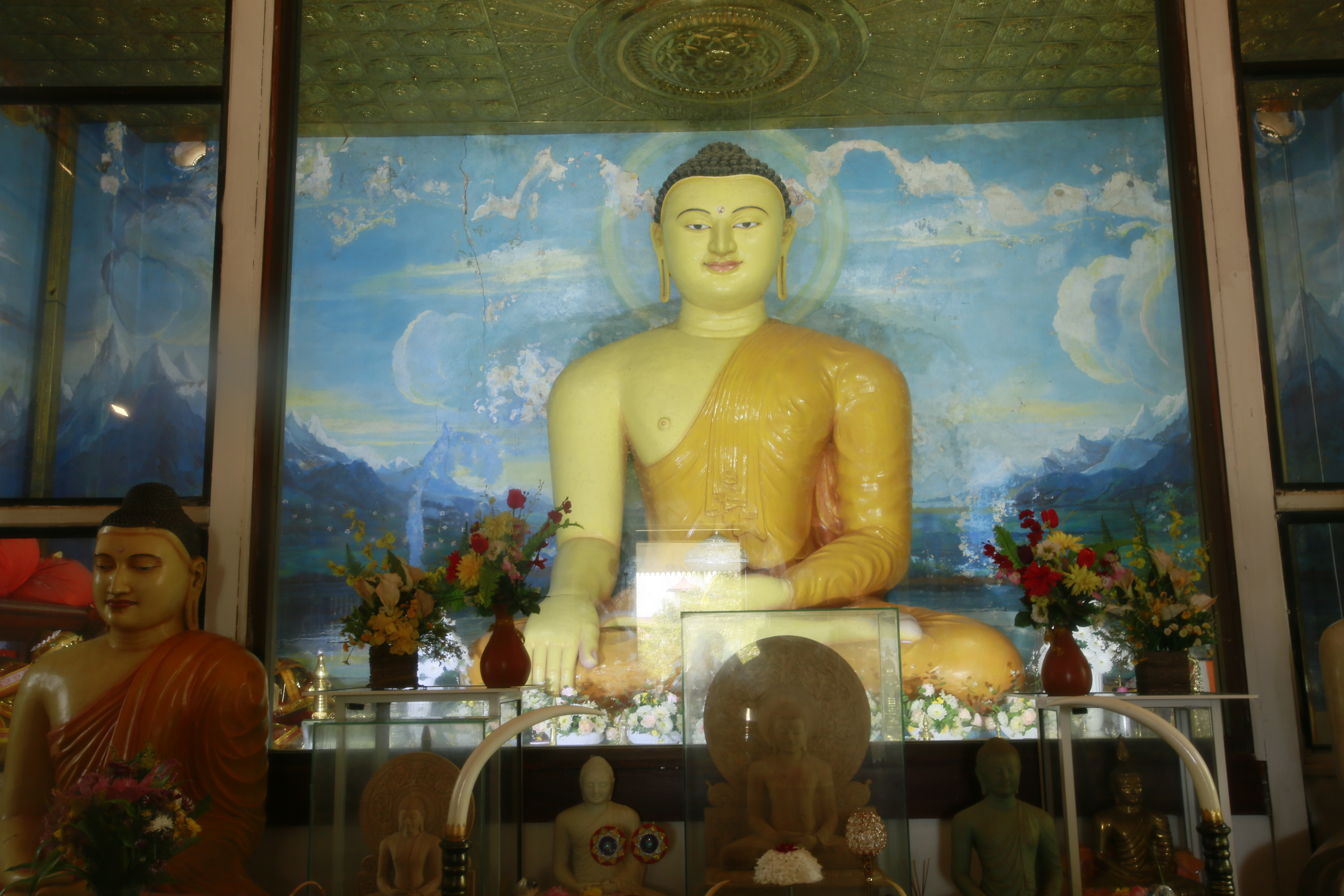
Bodhi Tree Image House Buddha at Anuradhapura Sri Lanka 2021.

=== Ancient statues ===
Two statues of Buddha can be seen in the image-house; a stone-standing-statue is in the right side of the stone wall. The cobra-stone is a very rare creation, showing the embossed figure of cobra. Several monolith heads with plain incisions are in this religious site.

=== Principal Buddha statue of the Śrī Mahā Bodhi shrine ===
The largest, and also in other aspects the most spectacular, stone image of a seated Buddha in Sri Lanka is located since about the sixth century on the premises of the Śrī Mahā Bodhi Shrine at the Mahāvihāra complex at Anurādhapura. The statue is carved out of a single slab of dolomite marble, measures 3.3 metres in height and is since 1911 installed in the image-house located east of the sacred Bodhi-tree. This Buddha is presumably the only known Sri Lankan Buddha seated in the "diamond posture" (vajraparyaṅkāsana) with both soles pointing upwards, and displaying the gesture of touching the earth (bhūmisparśa-mudrā or māravijaya-mudrā). All other seated Sri Lankan Buddhas usually rest in the "noble posture" (sattvaparyaṅkāsana) with the right leg placed upon the left leg with only the sole of the right foot visible, displaying instead the gesture of meditation with both hands placed in the lap (dhyāna-mudrā). The gesture of touching the earth (bhūmisparśa-mudrā) symbolizes Buddha Siddhartha's defeat of Māra (māravijaya) and subsequent enlightenment under the Bodhi-tree at Bodhgayā (Gayā district, Bihar, India). The only known Sri Lankan Buddha image displaying the bhūmisparśa-mudrā is thus fittingly placed beside the principal Bodhi-tree of Sri Lanka located at the Mahāvihāra complex. This Buddha was commissioned to be installed in the Śrī Mahā Bodhi Shrine and likely copied after an early North-Eastern Indian Pāla style image.

Faxian, the Chinese pilgrim, left the following account of his visit to the Śrī Mahā Bodhi Shrine during his stay in Sri Lanka in the years 411 to 413 CE, which was during the reign of King Mahānāma (c. 406–428 CE): "At the foot of the tree a shrine has been built, with the image of Buddha seated inside, an object of ceaseless worship to priests and laymen". The image seen by Faxian in the early 5th century cannot be the one installed at present in the Śrī Mahā Bodhi Shrine at the Mahāvihāra complex, dating earliest from the 6th century. Therefore, it can be concluded that the present Buddha image was likely not the first one to be installed near the Bodhi tree, but possibly the first depicted with the gesture of touching the earth (bhūmisparśa-mudrā).

=== Excavations and discoveries ===
Ruins of an ancient building called Mayura Pirivena (Mayura Monastery) have been found to the south-west of the Jaya Sri Maha Bodhi, and the ruins of a stupa called Dakkhina Tupa (Southern Monastery) can be seen nearby.

According to the ancient chronicles in Sri Lanka, some walls and terraces had been built surrounding the sacred tree at some time in the past. Mahavamsa states that King Gothabhaya (249–262 AD) built a rubble wall. Dipavamsa reports that a rock-laid terrace and a lattice wall was built by King Kirthi Sri Meghavarna (302–330 AD).

During excavation for reconstructing the present wall, the rubble wall with its foundation created by King Gotabhya, and the rock-laid terrace together with a lattice wall constructed by King Kirthi Sri Meghavarna were found. These were preserved in place, and were opened to public in January 2010.

== See also ==
- Bodhi tree at original location of Buddha's Nirvana in Bodh Gaya in India
- Mahabodhivamsa, poem about Bodhi tree of Bodh Gaya and Anuradhapura
- Sacred trees in Indic religions
- Buddhist pilgrimage
- Yatra
- List of individual trees
- List of oldest trees
