= Mayura Pirivena =

Ancient monastery in Anuradhapura, Sri Lanka

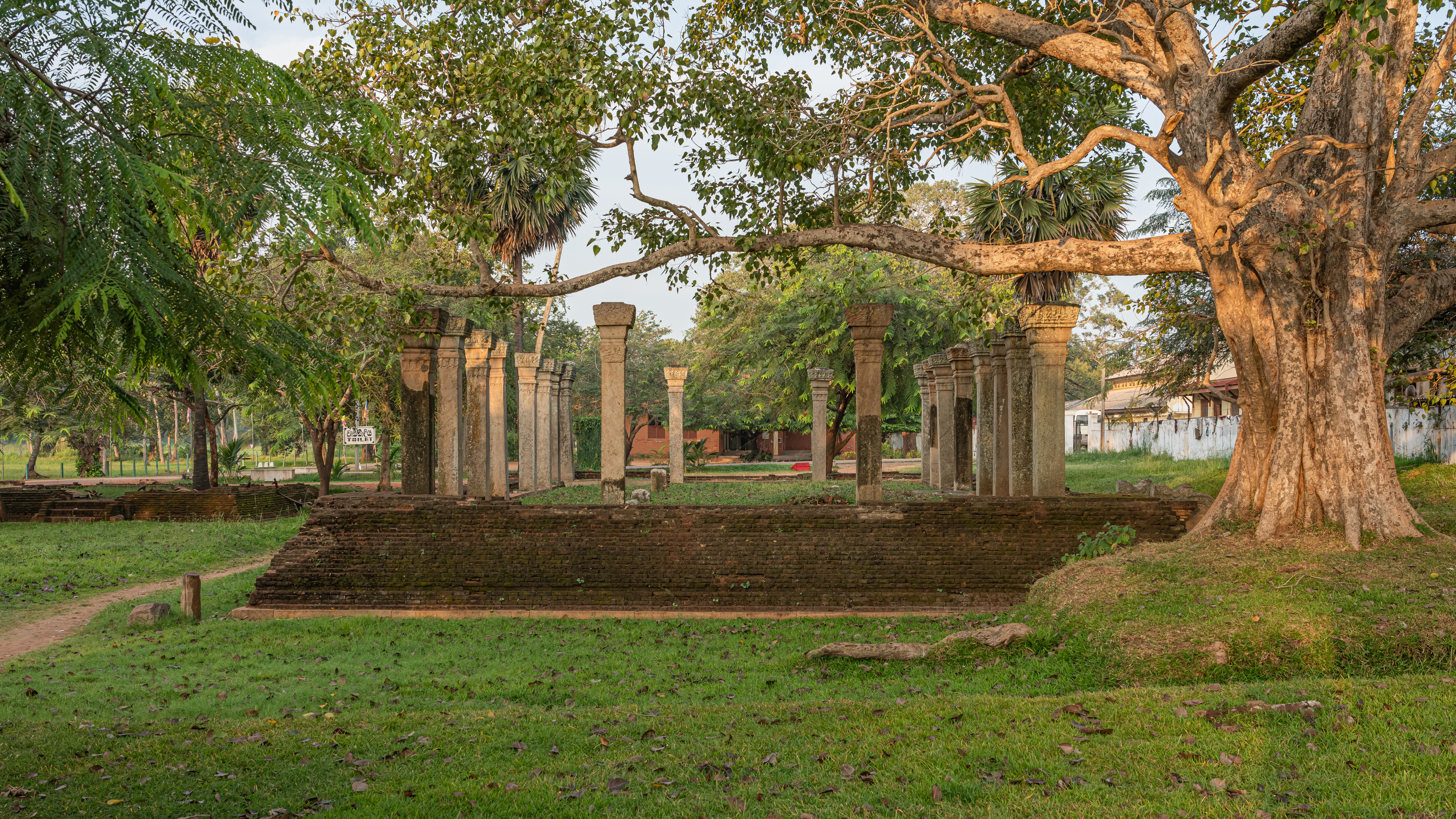
Mayura Pirivena

Mayura Pirivena (Mayura in Sinhala: peacock) is an ancient monastery situated to the south-west of the Jaya Sri Maha Bodhi, in Anuradhapura in Sri Lanka.

One of the ancient chronicles of Sri Lanka, the Mahavamsa, states that this monastery was built by King Buddhadasa, who ruled the island from 340 - 368 AD. King Dhatusena (455 - 477 AD) and King Mahanaga (573 - 575 AD) renovated the building. The Indian monk Buddhaghosha Thero resided here during his stay in Sri Lanka.

The ruins of the structure still remain are few stone columns with capitals, the entrance of the building built above a few steps and a moonstone below these steps. In the middle of the moonstone, a half of the lotus flower can be seen.

According to a report issued by Mr. H. C. P. Bell, the Archeological Commissioner of then Ceylon, this site was first excavated in 1894 and fallen pillars were lifted up. The report further states the length of the structure as 66 feet (20 m) and the width as 45.5 feet (13.9 m). Excavation in the location was carried out in 2011 and the site was preserved in 2012.

== Gallery ==
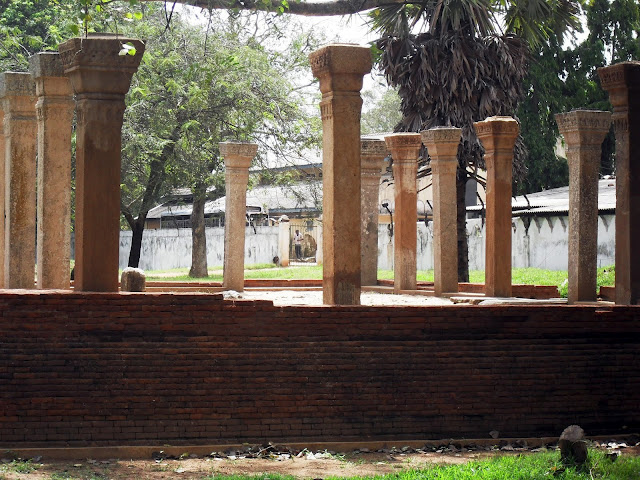
Closer view of Mayura Pirivena

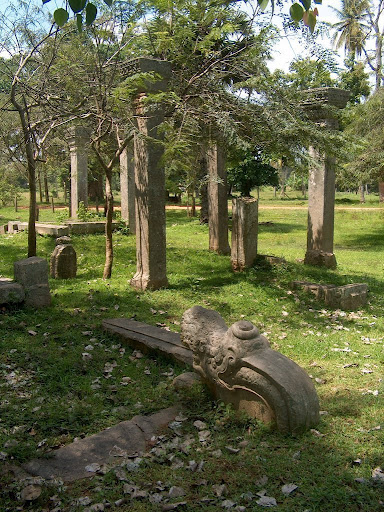
Mayura Pirivena as seen in 1970, before excavation
