= Buddhadasa of Anuradhapura =

Buddhadasa බුද්ධදාස
- Maharaja; Budadasa Mahasena

King of Anuradhapura
- Reign: 341 – 370
- Predecessor: Jettha Tissa II
- Successor: Upatissa I
- Issue: Upatissa I Mahanama
Names
- Bujas
- Dynasty: House of Lambakanna I
- Father: Jettha Tissa II
- Religion: Therevada Buddhism

Buddhadasa (Sinhala: බුද්ධදාස) was the King of Anuradhapura in the 4th century. His reign lasted from 341 to 370. He succeeded his father Jettha Tissa II as King of Anuradhapura and was later succeeded by his son Upatissa I in 370. He pioneered in building many hospitals in the country. The king was noted not only for his noble character but also for his intelligence. Sources such as Mahavamsa and Culavamsa describe Buddhadasa as a "Mind of Virtue and an Ocean of Gems" and he is known for his medical knowledge.

== Reign ==
The Culavamsa, a key historical text, dedicates considerable detail to his accomplishments in the medical field, often prioritizing these achievements over his political or administrative deeds. His compassion extended beyond humans, as he was reputed to have treated animals with the same care and attention. His rule was marked by the philosophy of Dasarajadharma imposed by the Lord Buddha.

King Buddhadasa established hospitals in every village and appointed physicians, compensating them with land. He also designated medical practitioners for horses, elephants, and soldiers, and built refuges for the disabled and the blind. He always carried a pocket knife and medicine with him, treating the sick wherever he encountered them.

== Social Works of Buddhadasa ==
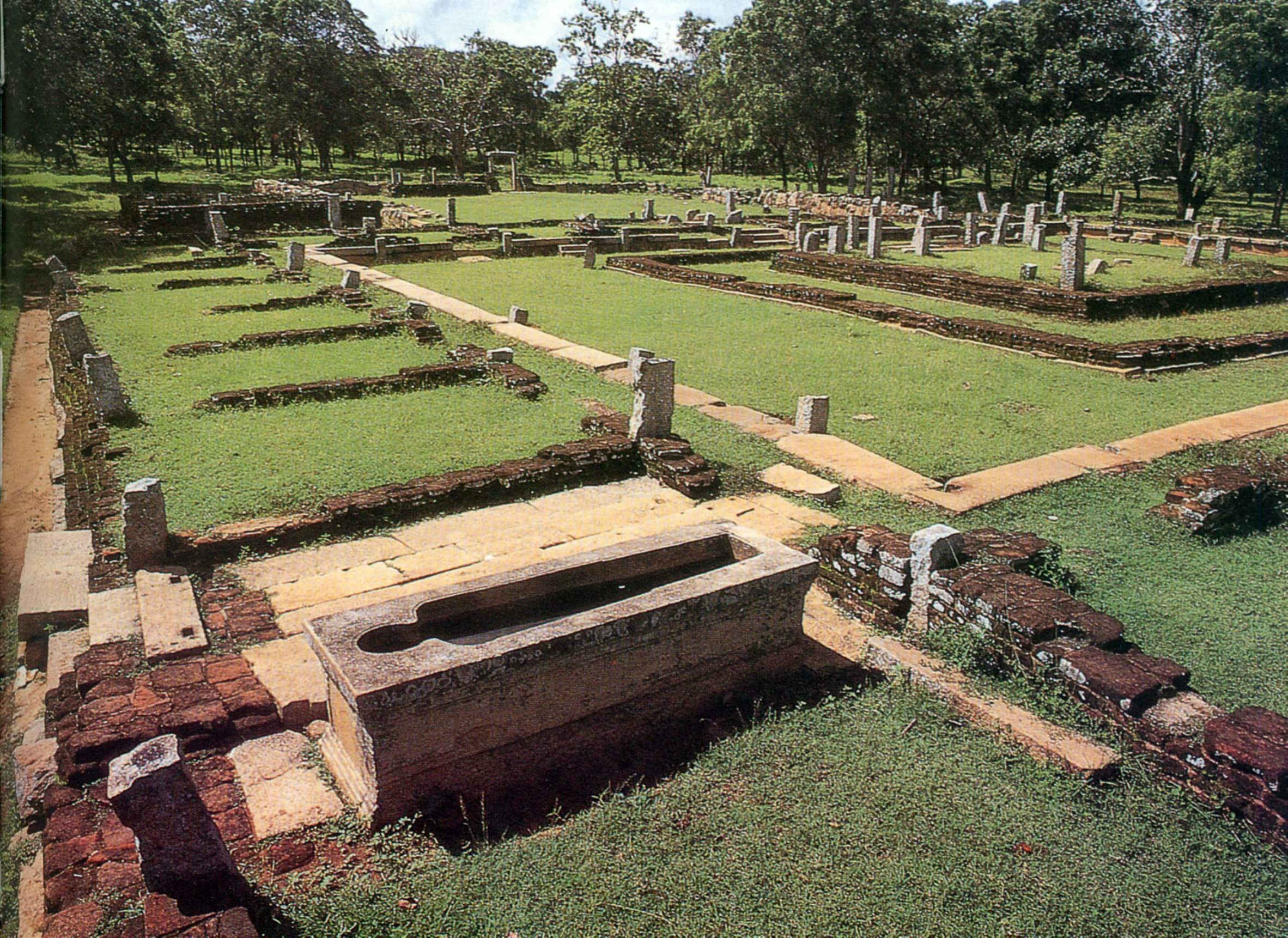
Medicinal trough in Ancient Mihintale Hospital Complex built by King Sena II

The Culavamsa, depict King Buddhadasa as a benevolent ruler whose legacy is primarily remembered for his exceptional contributions as a physician rather than his efforts toward Buddhism.

Moraparivena (Morapaya): built a beautiful prasada of 25 cubits (37–38 feet) tall in Maha Vihara monastery.

Papili Vehera

Sarartha Sangraha: He composed a medical treatise called Sarartha Sangraha meaning "An Essence of Medicine" which shows his inclination to literature.

Treatment of a cobra with a tumour in the belly: When a cobra with a tumorous growth in its belly realized that the king was hesitant to approach it, the snake inserted its head into an anthill cavity to facilitate the operation. The snake, getting to know that its suffering has come to an end, in return offered its great crown to the king.

Treatment of bhikkhu who drank milk with worms: The king administered an unknown liquid. After the bhikkhu drank it, the king revealed that the liquid was horse blood, obtained from a horse under treatment. Shocked by this, the bhikkhu immediately vomited, expelling the worms and thus curing him.

The man who consumed an egg of a watersnake: A man unknowingly swallowed a watersnake egg while drinking water, which eventually hatched inside him. The king made the man fast for a week and sleep with his mouth open. The king placed a piece of meat, tied to a string, in the man’s open mouth. Attracted by the smell, the snake emerged, and the king swiftly pulled it out with the string and placed it in a jug of water.

Treating a bhikku with a bent body born to a chandala woman.

The man who drank water with a frog egg: The eggs had hatched within the man’s body, causing him severe discomfort. The king performed a delicate surgical procedure to extract the tadpoles from the man’s head, successfully relieving him of his suffering.

== See also ==
- List of Sri Lankan monarchs
- History of Sri Lanka
- Ancient Mihintale Hospital Complex
- Healthcare in Sri Lanka

Buddhadasa of Anuradhapura House of Lambakanna I Born: ? ? Died: ? ?
Regnal titles
Preceded by Jettha Tissa II	King of Anuradhapura; 341–370	Succeeded by Upatissa I
