= Parakramam =

Parakramam (lit. 'heroism' in Sanskrit) may refer to:

- Parakramam (2024 Telugu film), a 2024 Indian Telugu-language film by Bandi Saroj Kumar
- Parakramam (2024 Malayalam film), a 2024 Indian Malayalam-language film

== See also ==
- Prakaram, wall enclosure in Indian architecture
- Parakrama, an Indian male given name
