= Mahavamsa Part III =

Mahavamsa Part III is the title of a Sinhala language continuation of the Mahavamsa published in 1935 by Yagirala Pannananda, a Sri Lankan Buddhist monk. Written at the request of a Sinhala village leader but without official approval or support from the government, it describes the history of Sri Lanka from 1889 until 1935.

== History ==
Yagirala Pannananda was approached in 1920 by a leader of the Sinhala ethnic community with a proposal to extend the Mahavamsa into the present day. Pannananda agreed, wanting not only describe the history of Sri Lanka under British colonial rule, but also to correct omissions in the Culavamsa, the previous extension of the Mahavamsa composed by several different authors between the 5th and 19th Century. Pannananda's teacher, Hikkaduve Summagala, had been one of two monks commissioned by the British government to extend and translate the Culavamsa in 1889.

While Pannananda's continuation of the Mahavamsa did not initially have any kind of official recognition or support, when Sri Lankan Prime Minister JR Jayawardene convened a committee in 1977 to again extend the Mahavamsa into the present day, the committee opted to resume the chronicle from 1935, effectively recognizing Pannananda's contribution as part of the Mahavamsa tradition.

== Contents ==
Pannananda's Mahavamsa Part III begins with the British deportation of Sri Vikrama Rajasinha of Kandy, the last king of the Kandyan state. It goes on to describe successive generations of British colonial administrators, framing Sri Lankan history around their arrivals and departures similarly to how previous sections of the Mahavamsa described the reigns of Sri Lanka's various kings.

Pannananda's view of the British colonial system seems to be positive overall, going so far as to compare popular royal governors with the heroic kings of the past. Other significant events mentioned by Pannananda include the visits of English royalty to Ceylon, the founding of the Royal Asiatic Society, the visits of Helena Blavatsky and Henry Steele Olcott, and the translation into English of the Mahavamsa by George Turnour.

Unlike previous sections of the Mahavamsa, which focused exclusively on the monks of the Mahavihara tradition, Pannanada includes the histories of several Sri Lankan monastic groups, including the Ramanna Nikaya and Amarapura Nikaya, rather than focusing exclusively on his own Siyam Nikaya. He also included details of policies and developments that impacted the life of everyday Sri Lankans, such as tax rates for farmers and the introduction of motorized trams, rather than focusing exclusively on royal/governmental and religious concerns.

In addition to events occurring between 1889 and 1935, Pannanada provided an appendix on the early colonial period between the 16th-19th Centuries. While this period was described in the Culavamsa, Pannanada believed that a variety of important information about this period had been omitted by the Culavamsa's authors for reasons of propriety, including accounts of the destruction of temples and libraries by the Portuguese. In order to provide a more complete picture of the early colonial era, he added an appendix to his Mahavamsa called parishista sangrahaya, or 'collection of things left out', that supplemented the accounts contained in the Culavamsa.

== Political legacy ==
The Mahavamsa is seen as a foundation of Sinhala identity, and Pannanada's Mahavamsa Part III was part of this tradition as well. In addition to further developing the idea of a distinct Sinhala identity, Pannanada's book introduced Sinhala-language terms for Western concepts of national identity such as 'motherland', 'patriotism', and 'nationalism' into the Sinhala lexicon.

Major themes developed in his chronicle are the decline of Sinhala fortunes due to the absence of the types of heroic leaders described in the Mahavamsa, and disunity as a frequent source of failure in Sinhala political fortunes. The emergence of the ordinary Sinhalese people as a distinct group with distinct needs and interests also features more prominently in Pannanada's work compared with earlier chronicles. All three of these themes would later be adopted by Sinhala nationalists and populists in the post-colonial era.
