= Louis Corneille Wijesinghe =

Mudaliyar Louis Corneille Wijesinha (19 September 1834 - 25 March 1895) was a Ceylonese British colonial-era headmen and a Pali scholar.

He was born in Panadura to Reverend Cornelius Wijesinha, the first Ceylonese Wesleyan Methodist Minister. He was educated at the Colombo Academy, leaving school at age 15 for a career in the Wesleyan Mission of Ceylon under the tutelage of Dr. Hill, Dr. Kessen and Rev. Dr. Gogerly. He studied Sinhala and Pali under the oriental scholars Pundit Batuwantudawe and Pundit Tudave. He was admitted to the Wesleyan Mission as a probationary minister, serving in Moratuwa, Dondra and Matara before leaving the mission. He joined Government Service in 1864, serving as a Kachcheri Mudaliyar in Ratnapura and Nuwara Eliya; and then a Court Interpreter Mudaliyar at Matale and Matara. His exposure of the oppression of tenants of various devales and nindagamas in the Kandian provinces led to the Service Tenures Ordinance.

On the invitation of Sir Arthur Gordon, the Governor of Ceylon, Wijesinha, completed the translation of the remaining 62 chapters of the Mahavansa, that was started by George Turnour, who published the first 38 chapters in 1837 before his death. Wijesinha completed it in 1889, including a review of the 38 chapters completed by Turner. In 1912, Wilhelm Geiger translated the Mahavamsa to German, which was then translated into English by Mabel Haynes Bode and revised by Geiger. He translated the Vyasakkara on the request of the Buddhist Theosophical Society which was published posthumously in 1917.

== Works ==
- Mahavamsa, 1889
- Vyasakkara, 1917
