= Yagirala Pannananda =

Sri Lankan Author

Yagirala Pannananda Thera was a Sri Lankan Buddhist monk and scholar. He was the author of a number of works in Sinhala and Pali, including a biography of his teacher Hikkaduve Sumangala and Mahavamsa Part III, an extension of the Mahavamsa chronicle covering the period from 1871 - 1935.

In the 1940s, Pannananda became involved in a public debate with other monks regarding the proper role of Buddhist monks in Sri Lankan society. Pannananda was recognized as the leader of a faction that believed that monks should not participate directly in politics, and wrote several newspaper editorials to this effect. In this debate, he found himself at odds with Walpola Rahula and faced calls that he should be forced to give up his robe for having received an award of a gold medal from the UNP government (accepting gold being forbidden by the Ten Precepts).
