= Upatissa I =

Upatissa I පළමුවන උපතිස්ස
- King of Anuradhapura
- Reign: 370 – 412
- Predecessor: Buddhadasa
- Successor: Mahanama
- Dynasty: House of Lambakanna I
- Father: Buddhadasa

Upatissa I (Sinhala: පළමුවන උපතිස්ස), was King of Anuradhapura in the 4th century, whose reign lasted from 370 to 412. He succeeded his father Buddhadasa as King of Anuradhapura and was succeeded by his brother Mahanama.

== See also ==
- List of Sri Lankan monarchs
- History of Sri Lanka

Upatissa I House of Lambakanna I Born: ? ? Died: ? ?
Regnal titles
Preceded by Buddhadasa	King of Anuradhapura; 370–412	Succeeded by Mahanama
