= King Mahanama =

Mahanama මහානාම
- King of Anuradhapura
- Reign: 412 – 434
- Predecessor: Upatissa I
- Successor: Soththisena
- Issue: Soththisena; Chattagahaka Jantu
- Dynasty: House of Lambakanna I
- Father: Buddhadasa
- Religion: Therevada Buddhism

Mahanama (Sinhala: මහානාම), was King of Anuradhapura in the 5th century, whose reign lasted from 412 to 434. He succeeded his brother Upatissa I as King of Anuradhapura and was succeeded by his son Soththisena.

According to the chronicles at first, this Mahanama was a monk and had an illicit relationship with the queen of Upathissa I. Then with the help of the queen he killed Upathissa and become king while placing the Queen of King Upathissa as his queen too. Anyway, after being king he has deeply devoted himself to Buddhism.

During his reign, the Abhayagiriya Monastery complex had become the largest and most powerful monastery within the country. As the host of the Tooth Relic of The Buddha, it became famous in the world. As different ideas and viewpoints were spread within the country, it transformed into more of an academic state, becoming the place where thousands of types of Buddhist scripture were present, along with various other types of knowledge. This prompted many foreign students to come to Sri Lanka to study there, including not only Buddhist monks, but also other scholars from India, Southeast Asia, and China.

So during his reign, there came special foreign travellers to Lanka and among those, most were Buddhist monks.

The first one was a famous traveller Faxian who came to Lanka in A.D.410 and lived two years in Abhayagiriya viharaya. According to his records at that time there were 3000 monks resident in the Maha Vihara monastery complex while the Abhayagiriya monastery complex could host 5000 monks. As well, Abhayagiriya had become guardians of the Tooth relic, Bowl relic and Heir relic of The Buddha. As well as these he saw the worship of Tooth Relic which was held for a total of 90 days with the participation of thousands of civilians, which was held in a special building in the Abhayagiri monastery complex area. During his time living in the country he took the Vinaya Pitaka (discipline system) of Mahinsashak (School) and Dirgagama and Samyukthagama sutras from this monastery and taken to China.

The second important traveller was Gunavarman who was a Buddhist scholar and prince of Kashmir and also came to Abhayagiriya. Then he travelled to Java and successfully converted the Dowager queen and King in that country into Buddhism. After that, he guided a group of monks and Bhikkhunis (female monks ) to Nanjing in China. This Bhikkuni group was led by Bhikkuni Devasara Thisarana (Tie-se-ra) and that happened in two steps. The First 8 bhikkhunis were sent to Nanjing(That time Jiankang) which was Capital of Liu Song under the captainship of sailor Nanda and he came back with a message of insufficient bhikkhunis to perform dual ordination ( this process was required for female monks to become Bhikkhunis under ordination of bhikkus.).Then Lanka sent another Bhikkuni group with 10 to China, while that previous group was proficient in the Chinese language and tradition. So with that, there was successfully delivered Bhikkuni Upasampada to China with the dedication of Gunavarman and the group came from Sri Lanka.

At the same time bhikkuni Chandramali was led another bhikkuni group to Tibet and was translated six Sanskrit text to Tibet which was including Tibetan thripitaka called as Kanjur.

Anyway, Maha Vihara also did not lose its renowned name worldwide during this time and kept it. But compared to Abhayagihira it was less than Abhayagihira's fame. During his time a monk named Buddhaghosa who was studied under Revatha thero in Maha Bodhi Vihara in India and learned Dhamma Pitaka under Thero Sanghapala in Mahavihara and Vinaya Pitaka under thero Bhuddhamitha who lived in a vihara sponsored by a lord called Mahanigasami which located south direction of Secret tree of The Buddha in Anuradhapura. For checking his knowledge Theros in Maha Vihara was assigned for making a book that simplifies deep meanings in Buddhism and created the marvellous book called Vishuddhimagga Sannaya as a result. Not only that he translated much scripture that was written in the local language in Pali language. However, some folklore said that during that period was burned thousands of books that are written in the local language about different fields. Also, king Mahanama made several temples during his period. From those "Lohodora", "Ralagamuwa", and "Kempasa" temples were donated to Abhayagiri monks and a temple build on Dumrak hill which memorandum of his queen was given to Maha Vihara. Also during his time there were happened letter exchanges between Lanka and China royal courts.

== See also ==
- List of Sri Lankan monarchs
- History of Sri Lanka

King Mahanama House of Lambakanna I Born: ? ? Died: ? ?
Regnal titles
Preceded by Upatissa I	King of Anuradhapura; 412–434	Succeeded by Soththisena
