= Jettha Tissa II =

Jettha Tissa II දෙවන ජෙට්ඨ තිස්ස
- King of Anuradhapura
- Reign: 328 to 337 AD
- Predecessor: Sirimeghavanna
- Successor: Buddhadasa
- Issue: Buddhadasa
- Dynasty: House of Lambakanna I
- Religion: Therevada Buddhism

Jettha Tissa II (Sinhala: දෙවන ජෙට්ඨ තිස්ස), also known as Detutis II, was King of Anuradhapura in the 4th century, whose reign lasted 9 years from 328 to 337 AD. He succeeded his brother Sirimeghavanna as King of Anuradhapura and was succeeded by his son Buddhadasa.

== See also ==
- List of Sri Lankan monarchs
- History of Sri Lanka

Jettha Tissa II House of Lambakanna I Born: ? ? Died: ? ?
Regnal titles
Preceded by Sirimeghavanna	King of Anuradhapura; 328 to 337 AD	Succeeded by Buddhadasa
