= Soththisena =

Soththisena සොත්ථිසේන
- King of Anuradhapura
- Reign: 434
- Predecessor: Mahanama
- Successor: Chattagahaka Jantu
- Dynasty: House of Lambakanna I
- Father: Mahanama

Soththisena (Sinhala: සොත්ථිසේන), was King of Anuradhapura in the 5th century, whose reign lasted the year 434. He succeeded his father Mahanama as King of Anuradhapura and was succeeded by his step sister's husband Chattagahaka Jantu. According to the great history of Sri Lanka, King Soththisena, the shortest reigning king of Sri Lanka, ascended the throne in the morning and was assassinated that evening in a palace conspiracy.

== See also ==
- List of Sri Lankan monarchs
- History of Sri Lanka

Soththisena House of Lambakanna I Born: ? ? Died: ? ?
Regnal titles
Preceded by Mahanama	King of Anuradhapura; 434–434	Succeeded by Chattagahaka Jantu
