= Dīpavaṃsa =

Oldest historical record of Sri Lanka

- Type: Post-canonical text; Vaṃsa
- Composition: 3rd-4th Century CE
- Attribution: Anonymous
- Abbreviation: Dīp

The Dīpavaṃsa (දීපවංශය, Pali: [diːpɐˈʋɐ̃sɐ] Sinhala: [දීපවංශ (Dipavansha)], "Chronicle of the Island") is the oldest historical record of Sri Lanka. The chronicle is believed to be compiled from Atthakatha and other sources around the 3rd to 4th century CE. Together with the Mahāvaṃsa, it is the source of many accounts of the ancient history of Sri Lanka and India. Its importance resides not only as a source of history and legend but also as an important early work in Buddhist and Pali literature.

== Contents ==
It is probably authored by several Buddhist monks or nuns of the Anuradhapura Maha Viharaya in the 3rd-4th century. The Dipavamsa was likely the first completely new Pali text composed in Sri Lanka; it was also among the last texts to be composed anonymously.

The preamble begins with "Listen! I shall relate the chronicle of the Buddha's visits to the island, the arrival of the Tooth Relic and the Bodhi tree, the advent of the Buddha's doctrine, the rise of the teachers, the spread of Buddhism in the island and the coming of Vijaya the Chief of Men". Dhatusena of Anuradhapura (5th century) had ordered the Dipavamsa be recited at the Mahinda festival held annually in Anuradhapura.

The Dipavamsa refers to three visits to the Island by the Buddha, the places being Kelaniya, Deegavapi Raja Maha Viharaya, the place where the Bo-sapling was later planted within the Maha Mewna-uyana (Park) of Anuradhapura. It does not make any mention of the Buddha visiting Sri Pada.

== Depiction of Buddhist sects ==
Starting with the Dīpavaṃsa in the 4th century, the Theravādins of the Mahāvihāra in Sri Lanka attempted to identify themselves with the original Sthavira sect of India. The Dīpavaṃsa lauds the Theravāda as a "great banyan tree," and dismissively portrays the other early Buddhist schools as thorns (kaṇṭaka).

These 17 sects are schismatic,
only one is non-schismatic.
With the non-schismatic sect,
there are eighteen in all.
Like a great banyan tree,
the Theravāda is supreme,
The Dispensation of the Conqueror,
complete, without lack or excess.
The other sects arose
like thorns on the tree.
— Dīpavaṃsa, 4.90–91

== Relationship to the Mahavamsa ==
Regarding the Vijaya legend, Dipavamsa has tried to be less super-natural than the later work, Mahavamsa, in referring to the husband of the Kalinga princess, ancestor of Vijaya, as a man named Sinha who was an outlaw that attacked caravans en route. In the meantime, Sinha-bahu and Sinhasivali, as king and queen of the kingdom of Lala (Lata), "gave birth to twin sons, sixteen times." The eldest was Vijaya and the second was Sumitta. As Vijaya was of cruel and unseemly conduct, the enraged people requested the king to kill his son. But the king caused him and his seven hundred followers to leave the kingdom, and they landed in Sri Lanka, at a place called Tamba-panni, on the exact day when the Buddha passed into Maha Parinibbana.

The Dipavamsa gives a fuller account of the arrival of Theri Sangamitta (daughter to Asoka), but the epic story of Dutugamunu is treated only briefly, in ten Pali stanzas, while the Mahavamsa devoted ten chapters to it. Due to the greater attention given to the nuns of Sri Lanka in the Dipavamsa, as well as the description of Sangamitta as being particularly proficient in history, Hugh Nevill suggested that the Dipavamsa might have originated with the nuns' community at one or more of the Viharas, rather than being composed by monks.

The Dipavamsa is considered "source material" to the Mahavamsa. The latter is more coherently organized and is probably the greatest religious and historical epic in the Pali language. The historiography (i.e., the chronology of kings, battles etc.) given in the Mahavamsa, and to that extent in the Dipavasma, are believed to be largely correct from about the time of the death of Ashoka.

== Editions, Translations and Studies ==
The Dīpavaṃsa was edited and translated into English by Hermann Oldenberg in 1879. Subsequently, the text was studied by B. C. Law in 1947. Tilman Frasch has shown that a longer and less corrupt version of the text was maintained in Burma compared to the Sinhalese manuscripts used by Oldenberg for his edition. One such manuscript is in the John Rylands Library.

== See also ==
- History of Sri Lanka
- Anuradhapura
- Polonnaruwa
- Mahāvaṃsa
- Bodhivaṃsa
