= Bodhivaṃsa =

The Bodhi-Vamsa, or Mahabodhivamsa, is a prose poem in elaborate Sanskritized Pali that recounts the story of the Bodhi tree of Bodh Gaya and Anuradhapura. It is attributed to a monk called Upatissa who lived during the reign of Mahinda IV of Sri Lanka, and believed to have been composed in the 10th Century AD. It is written in the kavya style.

== Contents ==
The Mahabodhivamsa is composed primarily in prose, but includes verses at the end of each chapter, many of them originating from the Mahavamsa. Like the Mahavamsa, the Mahabodhivamsa begins by recounting the recognition of Gautama Buddha by Dipankara Buddha and then proceeds to recount the life of Gautama Buddha and an account of the first three Buddhist Councils. It then describes the mission of Mahinda to bring Buddhism to Sri Lanka in the 3rd century BCE, and the transplantation of the Bodhi tree and the creation of the bodhipuja ceremony that celebrates it. It consists of twelve chapters, and ends with a list of locations where saplings from the Bodhi tree were planted. This list matches those included in the Samantapasadika of Buddhaghosa and the Mahavamsa.

According to its introduction, the Mahabodhivamsa is an adaptation of a previously existing work in Sinhalese on the same subject. The Mahabodhivamsa quotes verses from the Mahavamsa, but draws a great deal of its material from other sources and has occasionally preserved details of the older tradition not found in any other sources known, such as a variant form of the Kalingabodhi Jataka. The inclusion of quotations from the Mahavamsa and other Pali texts suggests that rather than simply translating an earlier Sinhala text, its author may have substantially expanded and supplemented the text.

The style of the Mahabodhivamsa shows a strong Sanskrit influence, using the Sanskrit meanings of some Pali words and incorporating Sanskrit terms and compounds. G.P. Malalasekera describes its composition as marking the beginning of an era of Sanskritized Pali composition that continued for several centuries in Sri Lanka.

== History and Authorship ==
The dating of the Mahabodhivamsa is based on the a Sinhalese commentary written in the late 12th Century. This is also the source of its attribution to Upatissa, who is otherwise unknown but described as composing the Pali text at the request of a monk called Dāthānāga, identified by 19th Century scholars with a monk by the same name mentioned in the Culavamsa and other sources as being appointed by Mahinda IV to teach the Abhidhamma.

== See also ==
- Jaya Sri Maha Bodhi
- Mahavamsa
- Buddhist texts
