= Cūḷavaṃsa =

Historical record of the monarchs of Sri Lanka

- Type: Chronicle
- Composition: 4th–18th Century CE
- Attribution: Dhammakitti, Tibbotuvāve Sumangala and others
- Abbreviation: Cula

The Cūḷavaṃsa or Chulavamsa (Pāli: "Lesser Chronicle Sinhala: "චූලවංශ ("Culavansha") is a historical record, written in the Pali language, of the monarchs of Sri Lanka. It covers the period from the 4th century to 1815. The Cūḷavaṃsa was compiled over many years by Buddhist monks, and displays a variety of epic styles. It is generally considered to be a sequel to the Mahavamsa ("Great Chronicle") written in the 6th century by the monk Mahanama. The Mahavamsa and the Cūḷavaṃsa are sometimes thought of as a single work (referred to as the "Mahavamsa") spanning over two millennia of Sri Lankan history.

== Contents ==
The Cūḷavaṃsa is a continuation of the Mahavamsa. But unlike the Mahavamsa it was written by different authors at different periods. The Cūḷavaṃsa is divided into two parts.

The first part, chapters thirty-seven to seventy-nine, begins with the 4th century arrival of a tooth relic of Siddhartha Gautama to Sri Lanka and continues to the reign of Parakramabahu the Great (1153–1186) in the 12th century, and was written in the 13th century. While the authorship of the first part is traditionally ascribed to the Buddhist monk Thera Dhammakitti, many historians now believe it to be a collaborative effort, written by a number of monks.

The second part, whose author remains unknown, records Sri Lankan history from the 12th century, with the reign of Vijayabahu II and continues the history of the Sinhalese monarchy to that of Parakramabahu IV (Chaps. 80–90). Within the second part the section of the chronicle which deals with the period from Parakramabahu IV to the death of Kirti Sri Rajasinha was compiled by Tibbotuvāve Sumangala Thera, while the last chapter was continued to 1815 by Hikkaduve Siri Sumangala. This portion of the chronicle has not been assigned a definite authorship and is generally considered inferior, both in style and in factual reliability, to Dhammakitti's portion.

== Significance ==
Tradition has it that the work was compiled by the monk Dhammakitti, whom Geiger regards as 'a man of literary culture ... acquainted with Indian Niti literature'. He regards 'the history of Parakkama [sic] as the real kernel, the main subject of the Culavamsa', much in the same way that Dutugemunu's life is the major part of the Mahavamsa.

Geiger believes that it is not possible 'to form a harmonious and credible picture of the single acts attributed to the youthful Parakkama [sic]' simply from the information presented in the Lesser Chronicle. The explanation for this lies in the writer's approach to history:

The explanation lies in Dhammakitti's conception of the way in which his task was to be achieved. From literary sources, from what he had read he drew an ideal picture of an Indian king. The man whose glorification was his aim must correspond to this picture. He must have all the qualities belonging to an Indian king and employ all the methods of statecraft which political science prescribes or recommends. All these individual traits the compiler combines with the data furnished by tradition, without question as to probability or improbability of these.

— W. Geiger, The Culavamsa, 1930, Introduction

That there is a certain amount of truth contained in the text is corroborated by numerous carvings, edicts and monuments still extant in Sri Lanka today – e.g., Parakramabahu's wars with Gajabahu II and Manabharana are attested to by at least one rock-carving from this period. Furthermore Geiger also believes that the Culavamsa 'does not consciously relate ... false [information]' but also he believes it has exaggerations, embellishments, suppresses the facts and invent stories, so need to deal with it caution and he said it is possible to find the correct informations in Culawamsa by separating these exaggerations and others.

The primary source for Parakramabahu's reign is the Cūḷavaṃsa.

== Translation ==
The foremost translation of this work was that of Wilhelm Geiger from Pali into German, completed in 1930. This was subsequently translated into English by Mabel Haynes Bode, and the English translation was revised by Geiger. In 1929 an English edition was published by Oxford University Press, translated by C. M. Rickmers.

The British colonial government commissioned a translation into English of the Cūḷavaṃsa in 1871 and published it alongside George Turnour's translation of the Mahavamsa.

== Continuations and related works ==
In 1871, the British colonial government of Sri Lanka commissioned a 101st chapter of the Cūḷavaṃsa, covering the period from 1815–1871.

In 1935, Yagirala Pannananda, a Buddhist monk, wrote Mahavamsa Part III, a further extension of the Cūḷavaṃsa, in Sinhala. While not authorized by any government agency or religious organization, it was eventually accepted as part of the larger Mahavamsa/Cūḷavaṃsa tradition.

In 1977, the government of Prime Minister JR Jayawardene established a commission to extend the chronicle to cover the years 1935–1977.

== See also ==
- History of Sri Lanka
- Buddhist texts
