= Sirimeghavanna =

King of Anuradhapura

Kirthi Sirimeghavanna කීර්ති සිරිමේඝවන්න කිත්සිරි මෙවන්
- Maharaja ^{A} ^{B}

King of Anuradhapura
- Reign: 301–328 AD
- Predecessor: Mahasena
- Successor: Jettha Tissa II
Names
- Aba; Sirimekavaṇa Aba
- Dynasty: House of Lambakanna I
- Father: Mahasena
- Religion: Theravada Buddhism

Sirimeghavanna, (Sinhala: සිරිමේඝවන්න) also known as Kirthi Sri Meghavarnabhaya (Sinhala: කීර්ති ශ්‍රී මේඝවර්ණාභය) and Kithsiri Mevan (Sinhala: කිත්සිරි මෙවන්), was King of Anuradhapura in the 4th century. According to the traditional chronology, he ruled during 301–328 AD; the modified chronology adopted by modern scholars such as Wilhelm Geiger assigns his reign to 352–379 CE.

He succeeded his father Mahasena as King of Anuradhapura and was succeeded by his brother Jettha Tissa II.

After the death of King Mahasen, his son Siri Meghavanna ascended the throne. Seeking to atone for the damage caused by his father, he consulted the Mahavihara bhikkus, who reminded him that the Mahavihara and the magnificent Lovamahapaya had been destroyed during Mahasen’s reign. In response, King Siri Meghavanna undertook their restoration. King Siri Meghavanna. He commissioned a statue of Mahinda Thera and placed it at Mihintale. Thonigala Rock Inscriptions (303AD-331AD) were also created during his reign.

== Importance ==
The sacred relic of the tooth of the Buddha was brought to Sri Lanka during the reign of King Kithsiri Mevan who welcomed it with great respect, ushered them to his capital and enshrined it in Meghagiri Viharaya, presently known as Isurumuniya in Anuradhapura. In order to honor the sacred tooth relic, an annual procession called dalada perahera begins from the era of this king.

Another creation of King Siri Meghavanna is the Egoda Kelaniya (Kithsiri Mewan Rajamaha Viharaya) temple. Its stupa enshrines the sacred Jalasatika Dhatu (නානකඩය or the bathing sarong of Lord Buddha). Remarkably, the surface of the stupa is said to remain moist throughout the year. Near the stupa is a Siripathula (footprint of the Buddha), which devotees are encouraged to worship when visiting. The temple also houses a unique Wel-Bodhi tree, where meditation is believed to yield profound spiritual benefits.

The Thonigala Rock Inscriptions (303–331 AD) (තෝනිගල සෙල්ලිපිය), created during his reign, provide evidence of an ancient banking system in which harvests were used to finance the maintenance of temples—possibly the oldest banking system in the world—while also supporting the chanting of the Ariyawansa Deshanawa.

== In popular culture ==
In the 2014 Sinhala film Siri Daladagamanaya, the role of King Sirimeghavanna was played by Udara Rathnayake.

== See also ==
- List of Sinhalese monarchs
- History of Sri Lanka
- Preserving Thonigala inscriptions
- Tōṇigala Rock Inscription of Śrīmeghavarṇṇa
- Thonigala Inscription at Vavuniya
- The Temple of the Tooth

Sirimeghavanna House of Lambakanna I Born: ? ? Died: ? ?
Regnal titles
Preceded by Mahasena	King of Anuradhapura; 301–328 AD	Succeeded by Jettha Tissa II
