= Vaṃsa =

Genre of ancient and medieval literature

Vamsa (Sanskrit: वंश, romanized: Vaṃśa) is a Sanskrit and Pali word that means 'bamboo, family, lineage'. It also refers to a genre of ancient and medieval literature in Buddhism, Hinduism and Jainism. This genre focuses on genealogies. They resemble the conventional histories found in the European literature, but differ as they predominantly chronicle myths and may integrate spiritual doctrines such as rebirths. A vaṃśa can be focussed on a dynasty, family, individual such as a saint, line of teachers of a particular tradition, or a place particularly of pilgrimage. Some of these texts are titled with vaṃśa as a suffix.

== Etymology ==
The word vaṃśa has ancient roots and refers to bamboo cane or sugar cane reed. According to Monier Monier-Williams, the term evolved to mean 'lineage', likely inspired by the periodic lengths of a cane, where one distinct segment follows the previous, grows, ends and is the basis of another. The word is found in the sense of "line of teachers", genealogy and family tree in theShatapatha Brahmana, as well as in Sanskrit grammar text Ashtadhyayi by Pāṇini. A related genre of Indic literature is the Charita, which focuses on individual hagiographies.

Vaṃśa appears in other Indic languages in derivative forms, such as bans.

== Buddhism ==
Buddhavaṃsa, Dipavaṃsa, and Mahāvaṃsa are examples of Buddhist vaṃsas. The Buddhavaṃsa chronicles the mythical lineage of 24 buddhas who preceded the actual human Buddha as Siddhartha, and includes the Bodhisatta doctrines. The Dipavaṃsa and Mahāvaṃsa both are Theravada chronicles of the island of Sri Lanka presenting legends about the place from the birth of the Buddha to about the early medieval era. According to Geiger, the Mahavamsa is likely based on Dipavamsa, these chronicles are of doubtful reliability.

The Dāthāvaṃsa is the chronicle of the Buddha's tooth relic until the 9th-century CE. The Thūpavaṃsa is the purported legendary chronicle of the great stupa in Sri Lanka, mostly ahistorical stories from the 1st millennium. The Sāsanavaṃsa is Burmese text, written in 1861, with a mythical description of central India from the 1st millennium BCE and thereafter, about the diffusion of Buddhism and its monastic institutions outside India. The Sangītivaṃsa is a Thai text composed in the 18th-century which traces the Buddha lineage in India, Buddhism's spread from India to Thailand and its history in the latter country, as well as an account of its decline.

== Hinduism ==
The Purana genre of Hindu literature includes genealogies similar to the Buddhist texts. Each Purana describes the vaṃśa (lineage) and a vaṃśānucharita (accounts of kings and sages). The two most prominent royal lineages are called the Suryavamsha and the Chandravamsha, the solar and the lunar lineages of kings, families, and communities. The Harivamsa is the legendary genealogy of Yadavas and story of the Hindu god Krishna. It is found as an appendix to the Mahabharata. The Puranas mention lineages of various creatures like daityas, nagas, as well as the descendants of prajapatis and rishis. Additionally there are two relatively newer royal vaṃsas, vaṃsas, the Agnivamsha (Note: There are numerous variant spellings of these clan names.) and the Nagavamsha.

== Jainism ==
The literature of Jainism includes the Vamsa genre, such as its version of Harivamsa.

== See also ==
- Bansuri
- Category:Sri Lankan chronicles
- Burmese chronicles
