= Parakrama =

Parakrama is both a given name and a surname. Notable people with the name include:

- Parakrama Pandyan I, Pandyan king
- Parakrama Pandyan II, Pandyan king
- Parakrama Kodituwakku, Sinhala poet
- Parakrama Niriella, Sri Lankan director
- Parakrama Pannipitiya, Sri Lankan army general
- Udayawansha Parakrama (born 1996), Sri Lankan cricketer
- Jatavarman Parakrama Pandyan, Indian royal
