= Relic of the tooth of the Buddha =

Relic venerated in Sri Lanka

The relic of the tooth of Buddha (Pali danta dhātuya) is venerated in Sri Lanka as a sacred cetiya relic of the Buddha and primarily refers to the purported tooth at the Temple of the Tooth, in Kandy.

== History ==
According to the Mahāparinibbāna Sutta, after the Buddha's passing and cremation, four teeth are explicitly noted to be in existence. Two of the relics are noted to be in mythological locations (Trāyastriṃśa and in the realm of the Nagaraja), while the other two are in earthly locations (Gandhāra and Kaliṅga). Out of these, the Nagaraja and the Kaliṅga tooth are purported to be extant.

One episode involving the relic during the Portuguese presence in Sri Lanka is described in both contemporary and later sources. According to the Portuguese chroniclers João de Barros and Diogo do Couto, the relic was seized during the 1560 expedition against the Jaffna Kingdom and taken to Goa, where it was destroyed on the orders of the Viceroy, Constantino de Bragança. Prior to this, the relic had been kept in the Jaffna Kingdom after the defeat of Veediye Bandara, the commander of the Kingdom of Kotte, at Nallur. Paulus Edward Pieris similarly records that the relic was burnt and its remains were thrown into the sea, and that before its capture the relic had been kept in the Jaffna Kingdom after the defeat of Veediye Bandara, commander of the Kingdom of Kotte, at Nallur.

== Kaliṅga tooth ==
According to the Mahāvaṃsa and the Dāṭhavaṃsa, during the Buddha's cremation, his left canine was retrieved by his disciple Khema, who in turn gave it to King Brahmadatte of Kaliṅga for veneration, being kept at Dantapura (modern Dantapuram). At some point, the tooth relic gained the reputation for giving whoever held the relic the divine right to rule the land, with the Dāṭhavaṃsa reporting a war between Guhasiva of Kaliṅga and the king Pandu over its possession.

Legend states that following a conflict in Kaliṅga, the tooth was brought to the Abhayagiri Vihāra in Anuradhapura, Sri Lanka. The relic changed locations as the seat of government changed on the island, whereupon it was brought to Kandy, where it currently rests at the Temple of the Tooth.

== Rumored Buddha tooth relics ==
Aside from the two tooth relics in Sri Lanka, other tooth relics have been reported globally. A 2024 survey found that 32 museums and temples claimed to hold one or more of the tooth-relics, including.

- Lingguang Temple (灵光寺) of the Badachu Park in Beijing, China.
- Buddha Memorial Center (佛陀紀念館) of the Fo Guang Shan Monastery in Kaohsiung, Taiwan.
- Engaku Temple in Kamakura, Japan.
- Buddha Tooth Relic Temple and Museum (佛牙寺龍華院) in Chinatown, Singapore.
- Lu Mountain Temple in Rosemead, California
- Nagarjunakonda, in a museum on the Nagarjunasagar Lake island in Andhra Pradesh, India.
- Lawkananda Pagoda in Bagan, Burma

== See also ==
- Cetiya
- Relics associated with Buddha#Relics in Sri Lanka
- Relics of Sariputta and Moggallana
- Śarīra
- Refuge in Buddhism
- Dathavamsa
- Diyawadana Nilame
- Kandy Esala Perahera
- Bayinnaung Kyawhtin Nawrahta
- Chinese expeditions to the Sinhala Kingdom
- Velakkara revolt
- Goa Inquisition
