= George Turnour =

British civil servant in Ceylon (1799–1843)

George Turnour Jnr, CCS (1799–1843) was a British colonial administrator, scholar and a historian. A member of the Ceylon Civil Service, he served as a Government Agent, Assistant Colonial Secretary and Treasurer of the Colony. He is known for his translation of the Mahavamsa, the Great Chronicle of Sri Lankan history which was published in 1837. Along with James Prinsep and Captain Edward Smith, he began to decipher the inscriptions on the first discovered Pillar of Ashoka.

== Early life ==
Born in Ceylon on 11 March 1799, his father was the Honorable George Turnour Snr, the son of the British politician Edward Garth-Turnour, 1st Earl Winterton. George Turnour Snr came to India joining the Bengal Native Infantry as an ensign. He landed in Ceylon in 1783 with the 73rd Regiment. In 1795, he was appointed Fort Adjutant of the Jaffna Fort and later made Commandant of the Mannar Fort in 1797. He married Emilie de Beaussett, niece of Cardinal Duc de Beaussett. In 1799, Lieutenant Turnour was dismissed from command following an inquiry instituted by the Governor on irregularities in the Mannar Pearl Fishery which found "gross and incalculable fraud". Thereafter, Turnour Snr tried his hand in trading business between Indian and Ceylon which failed, prompting him to return to Jaffna insolvent in 1807. He was able to gain appointment as Revenue Agent of the Wanni, Assistant Collector of Jaffna in 1813 and served as Sitting Magistrate and Fiscal. He died in April 1813.

George Turnour Jnr was the eldest of six siblings, he had one younger brother Edward Archer and four sisters Anne Emily, Frances, Elizabeth and Jane. In 1811, he was sent to England for education under the patronage of Sir Thomas Maitland.

== Civil service career ==
On his return in 1820, he was appointed to the Ceylon Civil Service as Assistant to the Commissioner of Revenue. Thereafter he was made Assistant to the Chief Secretary. In 1822 he was appointed the Collector of Kalutara. In 1825 he was appointed Government Agent of Sabaragamuwa Province based in Ratnapura until he was transferred to Kandy as Revenue Commissioner in 1828. In 1833, he was appointed as the first Government Agent of the Central Province. In 1841, he was transferred to Colombo as Assistant Colonial Secretary and was appointed Treasurer. Due to ill health he retired early and returned to England and set out to Italy where he died in Naples on the 10 April 1843 aged 44 years.

== Honours ==
He was elected an honorary member of the Royal Asiatic Society of Great Britain and Ireland. Following his death, a fund was raised which erected a tablet at St. Paul's Church, Kandy. The remaining funds were used to start the Turnour Prize at the Royal College, Colombo.

== Works ==
- History of Ceylon
- The Mahawanso in Roman Characters with the Translation Subjoined, and an Introductory Essay on Pali Buddhistical Literature. Cotto 1837.
- Eleven Years in Ceylon

== See also ==
- Mahavamsa
- James Prinsep
- Pillars of Ashoka
- Turnour Prize
