= Mahāvaṃsa =

Historical chronicle of Sri Lanka

- OpenTipitaka
- Type: Post-canonical text; Chronicle
- Composition: 5th century CE
- Attribution: Mahānāma
- Related: Mahavamsa-tika

Mahāvaṃsa (Pali: මහාවංස, romanized: Mahāvaṃsa Sinhala: මහාවංශ, romanized: Mahāvansha) is the historical chronicle of Sri Lanka until the period of Mahasena of Anuradhapura. It was written in the style of an epic poem written in the Pali language. It relates the history of Sri Lanka from its legendary beginnings up to the reign of Mahasena of Anuradhapura covering the period between the arrival of Prince Vijaya from India in 543 BCE to his reign and later updated by different writers. It was first composed by a Buddhist monk named Mahānāma at the Mahavihāraya Temple in Anuradhapura in the 5th or 6th-century.

The Mahāvaṃsa first came to the attention of Western researchers around 1809, when Sir Alexander Johnston, Chief Justice of the British Ceylon, sent manuscripts of it and other Sri Lankan chronicles (written in mainly Sinhala language being the main language of Sri Lanka) to Europe for translation and publication. Eugène Burnouf produced a Romanized transliteration and translation into Latin in 1826, but these garnered relatively little attention. Working from Johnston's manuscripts, Edward Upham published an English translation in 1833, but it was marked by several errors in translation and interpretation, among them suggesting that the Buddha was born in Sri Lanka and built a monastery atop Adam's Peak. The first printed edition and widely read English translation was published in 1837 by George Turnour, a historian and officer of the Ceylon Civil Service who translated 38 chapters. Louis Corneille Wijesinghe completed the remaining 62 chapters and reviewed Turnour's work, publishing in 1889. A German translation of the Mahavamsa was completed by Wilhelm Geiger in 1912. This was then translated into English by Mabel Haynes Bode, and revised by Geiger.

In 2023, the Mahāvaṃsa was listed an item of globally important documentary heritage on UNESCO’s Memory of the World Programme's International Register.

== Compilation ==
The Buddhist monks of the Anuradhapura Maha Viharaya maintained chronicles of the island's history starting from the 3rd century BCE. These annals were then combined and compiled into a single document in the 5th century while King Dhatusena was ruling the Anuradhapura Kingdom. It was written based on prior ancient compilations known as the Atthakatha (sometimes Sinhalaatthakatha), which were commentaries written in Sinhala. An earlier document known as the Dipavamsa (4th century CE) "Chronicles of the Island" is much simpler and contains less information than the Mahavamsa and was probably compiled using the Atthakatha on the Mahavamsa as well.

Authorship of the Mahavamsa is attributed to an otherwise unknown monk called Mahānāma by the Mahavamsa-tika. Mahānāma is described as residing in a monastery belonging to general Dighasanda and affiliated with the Mahavihara, but no other reliable biographical information is known. Mahānāma introduces the Mahavamsa with a passage that claims that he intends to correct repetitions and shortcomings that afflicted the chronicle compiled by the ancients- this may refer either to the Dipavamsa or to the Sinhala Atthakatha.

== Contents ==
The contents of the Mahavamsa can be broadly divided into four categories:

- The Buddha's Visits to Sri Lanka: This material recounts three legendary visits by the Buddha to the island of Sri Lanka. These stories describe the Buddha subduing or driving away the Yakkhas (Yakshas) and Nagas that were inhabiting the island and delivering a prophecy that Sri Lanka will become an important Buddhist center. These visits are not mentioned in the Pali Canon or other early sources.
- Chronicles of Kings of Sri Lanka: This material consists of genealogies and lineages of Sri Lankan kings, sometimes with stories about their succession or notable incidents in their reigns. This material may have been derived from earlier royal chronicles and king lists that were recorded orally in vernacular languages, and are a significant source of material about the history of Sri Lanka and nearby Indian kingdoms.
- History of the Buddhist Sangha: This section of the Mahavamsa deals with the mission sent by Emperor Ashoka to Sri Lanka, the transplantation of the bodhi tree, and the founding of the Mahavihara. It includes the names of prominent monks and nuns in the early Sri Lankan sangha. It also includes accounts of the early Buddhist councils and the first recording of the Pali canon in writing. This is a significant source of material about the development of the early Buddhist community and includes the names of missionaries dispatched to various regions of South and Southeast Asia, some of which have been confirmed by inscriptions and other archaeological evidence.
- Chronicles of Sri Lanka: This material begins with the immigration of Prince Vijaya from India with his retinue and continues until the reign of King Mahasena, recounting wars, succession disputes, the building of stupas and reliquaries, and other notable incidents. An extensive chronicle of the war between the Sinhala King Dutthagamani and Tamil invader, and later king, Elara (861 verses in the Mahavamsa compared with 13 verses in the Dipavamsa) may represent the incorporation of a popular epic from the vernacular tradition.

While much of the contents of the Mahavamsa is derived from expansions of the material found in the Dipavamsa, several passages specifically dealing with the Abhayagiri vihara are omitted, suggesting that the Mahavamsa was more specifically associated with the Mahavihara.

== Further compilations ==
A companion volume, the Culavamsa "Lesser Chronicle", compiled by Sinhala monks, covers the period from the 4th century to the British takeover of Sri Lanka in 1815. The Culavamsa was compiled by several authors of different periods.

The combined work sometimes referred to collectively as the Mahavamsa, provides a continuous historical record of over two millennia, and is considered one of the world's longest unbroken historical accounts. It is one of the few documents containing material relating to the Nāga and Yakkha peoples, indigenous inhabitants of Lanka before the legendary arrival of Prince Vijaya from Singha Pura of Kalinga. As it often refers to the royal dynasties of India, the Mahavamsa is also valuable for historians who wish to date and relate contemporary royal dynasties in the Indian subcontinent. It is very important in dating the consecration of the Maurya Emperor Ashoka, which is related to the synchronicity with the Seleucid Empire and Alexander the Great. Indian excavations in Sanchi and other locations, confirm the Mahavamsa account of the empire of Ashoka. The accounts given in the Mahavamsa are also amply supported by the numerous stone inscriptions, mostly in Sinhala, found in Sri Lanka. K. Indrapala has also upheld the historical value of the Mahavamsa. If not for the Mahavamsa, the story behind the large stupas in Anuradhapura, Sri Lanka, such as Ruwanwelisaya, Jetavanaramaya, Abhayagiri vihāra and other works of ancient engineering would never have been known.

== Historical and literary significance ==
Historiographical sources are rare in much of South Asia. As a result of the Mahavamsa, comparatively more is known about the history of the island of Sri Lanka and neighboring regions than that of most of the subcontinent. Its contents have aided in the identification and corroboration of archaeological sites and inscriptions associated with early Buddhism, the empire of Ashoka, and even the Tamil kingdoms of southern India.

The Mahamvasa covers the early history of Buddhism in Sri Lanka, beginning with the time of Siddhartha Gautama, the founder of Buddhism. It also briefly recounts the history of Buddhism in India, from the date of the Buddha's death to the 3rd Buddhist council where the Dharma was reviewed. Every chapter of the Mahavamsa ends by stating that it is written for the "serene joy of the pious". From the emphasis of its point-of-view, and being compiled to record the good deeds of the kings who were patrons of the Anuradhapura Maha Viharaya, it has been said to support Sinhalese nationalism.

Besides being an important historical source, the Mahavamsa is the most important epic poem in the Pali language. Its stories of battles and invasions, court intrigue, and great constructions of stupas and water reservoirs, written in elegant verse suitable for memorization, caught the imagination of the Buddhist world of the time. Unlike many texts written in antiquity, it also discusses various aspects of the lives of ordinary people, and how they joined the King's army or farmed. Thus the Mahavamsa was taken along the Silk Road to many Buddhist lands. Parts of it were translated, retold, and absorbed into other languages. An extended version of the Mahavamsa, which gives many more details, has also been found in Southeast Asia. The Mahavamsa gave rise to many other Pali chronicles, making Sri Lanka of that period probably the world's leading center in Pali literature.

== Political significance ==
The Mahavamsa has, especially in modern Sri Lanka, acquired significance as a document with a political message. The Sinhalese majority often use Mahavamsa as proof of their claim that Sri Lanka is a Sinhalese nation since ancient times.

The British historian Jane Russell has recounted how a process of "Mahavamsa bashing" began in the 1930s, from within the Tamil Nationalist movement. The Mahavamsa, being a history of the Sinhala Buddhists, presented itself to the Tamil Nationalists and the Sinhala Nationalists as the hegemonic epic of the Sinhala people. This view was attacked by G. G. Ponnambalam, a representative of the Nationalist Tamils in the 1930s. He claimed that most of the Sinhala kings, including Vijaya, Kasyapa, and Parakramabahu, were Tamils. Ponnambalam's 1939 speech in Nawalapitiya, attacking the claim that Sri Lanka is a Sinhalese, Buddhist nation was seen as an act against the notion of creating a Sinhalese-Buddhist only nation. The Sinhala majority responded with a mob riot, which engulfed Nawalapitiya, Passara, Maskeliya, and even in Tamil Jaffna.

== Historical accuracy ==
Early Western scholars like Otto Franke dismissed the possibility that the Mahavamsa contained reliable historical content, but subsequent evidence from inscriptions and archaeological finds have confirmed that there is a factual basis for many of the stories recorded in the Mahavamsa, including Ashoka's missionary work and the kings associated with founding various monasteries and stupas. The contents of the Mahavamsa beginning from the King Devanampiyatissa is considered mostly historically accurate, apart from some biases by the writers.

Wilhelm Geiger was one of the first Western scholars to suggest that it was possible to separate useful historical information from the mythic and poetic elaborations of the chronicle. While other scholars had assumed that the Mahavamsa had been assembled from borrowed material from Indian Pali sources, Geiger hypothesized that the Mahavamsa had been based on earlier Sinhala sources that originated on the island of Ceylon. While Geiger did not believe that the details provided with every story and name were reliable. He broke from earlier scholars in believing that the Mahavamsa faithfully reflected an earlier tradition that had preserved the names and deeds of various royal and religious leaders, rather than being a pure work of heroic literary fiction. He regarded the early chapters of the Culavamsa as the most accurate but he considered it too has exaggerations, embellishments, suppresses the facts and invent stories, the early chapters of the Mahavamsa being too remote historically and the later sections of the Culavamsa marked by excessive elaboration.

Geiger's Sinhala student G. C. Mendis was more openly skeptical about certain portions of the text, specifically citing the story of the Sinhala ancestor Vijaya as being too remote historically from its source and too similar to an epic poem or other literary creation to be seriously regarded as history. The date of Vijaya's arrival is thought to have been artificially fixed to coincide with the date for the death of Gautama Buddha around 543 BCE. The Chinese pilgrims Fa Hsien and Hsuan Tsang both recorded myths of the origins of the Sinhala people in their travels that varied significantly from the versions recorded in the Mahavamsa- in one version, the Sinhala are descended from naga or nature spirits who traded with Indian merchants, and in another, the Sinhala progenitor is a prince exiled for patricide who then slays a wealthy merchant and adopts his 500 children.

The story of the Buddha's three visits to Sri Lanka is not recorded in any source outside of the Mahavamsa tradition. Moreover, the genealogy of the Buddha recorded in the Mahavamsa describes him as being the product of four cross cousin marriages. Cross-cousin marriage is associated historically with the Dravidian people of southern India- both Sri Lankan Tamils and Sinhala practiced cross-cousin marriage historically- but the exogamous marriage was the norm in the regions of northern India associated with the life of the Buddha. No mention of cross-cousin marriage is found in earlier Buddhist sources, and scholars suspect that this genealogy was created to fit the Buddha into conventional Sri Lankan social structures for noble families.

The historical accuracy of Mahinda converting the Sri Lankan king to Buddhism is also debated. Hermann Oldenberg, a German scholar of Indology who has published studies on the Buddha and translated many Pali texts, considers this story a "pure invention". V. A. Smith (Author of Ashoka and Early History of India) also refers to this story as "a tissue of absurdities". V. A. Smith and Professor Hermann came to this conclusion due to Ashoka not mentioning the handing over of his son, Mahinda, to the temple to become a Buddhist missionary and Mahinda's role in converting the Sri Lankan king to Buddhism, in his 13th-year Rock Edicts, particularly Rock-Edict XIII. Sources outside of Sri Lanka and the Mahavamsa tradition do not mention Mahinda as Ashoka's son. There is also an inconsistency with the year in which Ashoka sent Buddhist missionaries to Sri Lanka. According to the Mahavamsa, the missionaries arrived in 255 BCE, but according to Edict 13, it was five years earlier in 260 BCE.

According to Leslie Gunawardana, the Mahavamsa was not written as a ethnography of the Sinhalese people but rather as a chronicle of the Sinhala royal dynasty and the Vijaya myth was created to consolidate power. He notes that while the Mahavamsa refers to Vijaya and his followers as Simhala this does not extend to service castes that came to serve them.

== Related works ==
The Mahavamsa is believed to have originated from an earlier chronicle known as the Dipavamsa (4th century CE; lit. 'Island Chronicles'). The Dipavamsa is much simpler and contains less information than the Mahavamsa and probably served as the nucleus of an oral tradition that was eventually incorporated into the written Mahavamsa. The Dipavamsa is believed to have been the first Pali text composed entirely in Ceylon.

A subsequent work sometimes known as Culavamsa extends the Mahavamsa to cover the period from the reign of Mahasena of Anuradhapura (277–304 CE) until 1815, when the entire island was surrendered to the British throne. The Culavamsa contains three sections composed by five different authors (one anonymous) belonging to successive historical periods.

In 1935, Buddhist monk Yagirala Pannananda published Mahavamsa Part III, a Sinhala language continuation of the Mahavamsa that covers the period from the end of the Culavamsa up until 1935. While not authorized or supported by any government or religious organization, this continuation of the Mahavamsa was later recognized by the government of the Sri Lankan Prime Minister J. R. Jayawardene.

A commentary on the Mahavamsa, known as the Mahavamsa-tika, is believed to have been composed before the first additions composing the Culavamsa were written, likely sometime between 1000 CE and 1250 CE. This commentary provides explanations of ambiguous Pali terms used in the Mahavamsa, and in some cases adds additional details or clarifies differences between different versions of the Mahavamsa. Unlike the Mahavamsa itself, which is composed almost entirely of material associated with the Mahavihara, the Mahavamsa-tika makes several references to commentaries and alternate versions of the chronicle associated with the Abhayagiri vihara tradition.

=== Extended ===
In Southeast Asia, a Pali work referred to as the "Extended Mahavamsa" includes not only the text of the Sri Lankan Mahavamsa, but also elements of the Thupavamsa, Buddhavamsa, Mahavamsa commentaries, and quotations from various jatakas. It is sometimes referred to in academic literature as the Kampuchean Mahavamsa or Khmer Mahavamsa because it is distinguished by being recorded in the Khmer script. Its composition is attributed to an otherwise unknown monk called Moggallana and its exact period of composition and origin are unknown. The origin of this version is believed to be Burma or Thailand.

== See also ==
- History of Sri Lanka
- Anuradhapura
- Laṅkāvatāra Sūtra
