= Uda Makuruppe =

Coordinates: 7°08′N 80°48′E

- Village
- Interactive map of Uda Makuruppe
- Country: Sri Lanka
- Province: Central Province
- Time zone: UTC+5:30 (Sri Lanka Standard Time)
- GN No.: 484B

Uda Makuruppe is a village in the Nuwara Eliya District of Central Province, Sri Lanka. Listed as Uda Makuruppa grama niladhari division in the Hanguranketha Divisional Secretariat, the 2011 Sri Lanka census gives its population as 748.

== History ==
In A gazetteer of the Central Province of Ceylon of 1898, Uda Makuruppe and Palle Makuruppe are listed as villages in the Kohoke korale of Upper Hewaheta. The combined population of the two villages is given as 228 in 1871, 254 in 1881 and 216 in 1891. Two wewas or tanks in Uda Makuruppe were no longer in use and the rice paddies were watered by small elas or streams. A vihara lay in ruins, but a kovila is described as "in good order".

The Uda part of the name means upper; Palle means lower.

== See also ==
- List of towns in Central Province, Sri Lanka
