= Yodha Ela =

Trans-basin diversion canal in Sri Lanka

Coordinates: 8°01′N 80°31′E

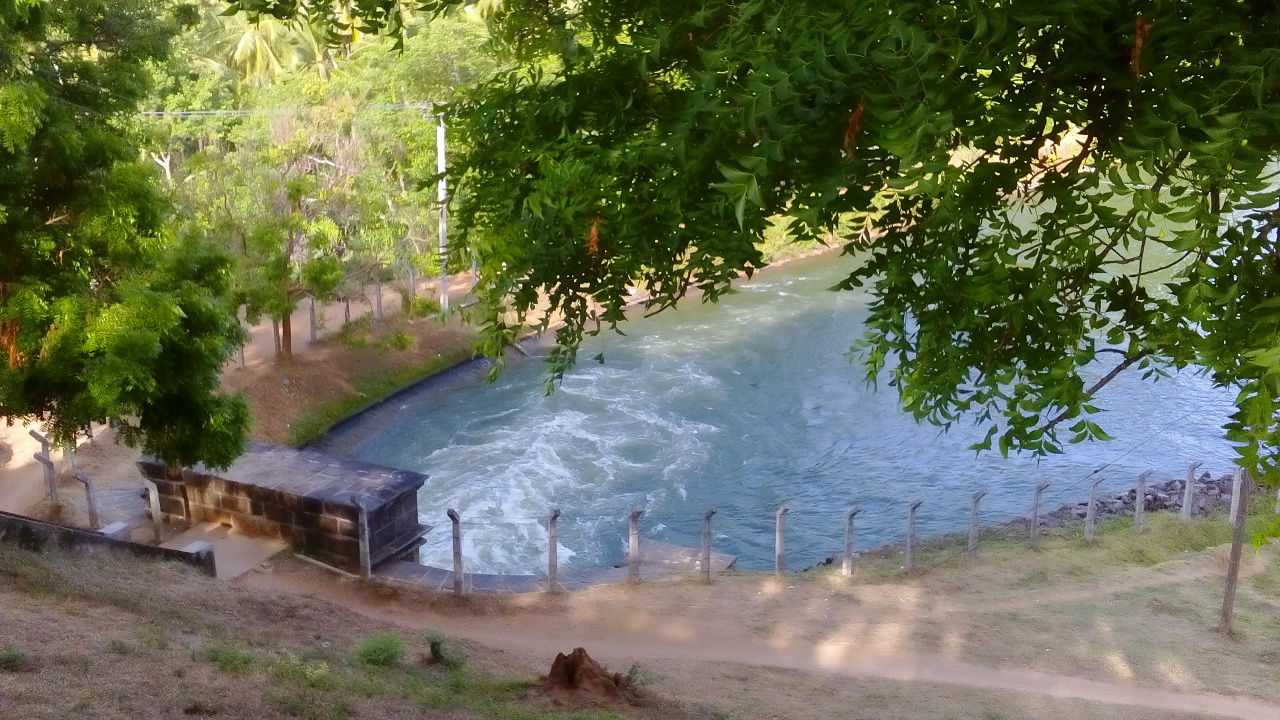
- The Bisokotuwa of Kala wewa passes water through its Sorowwa where Yodha Ela starts.

Specifications
- Length: 87 km (54 miles)

History
- Date completed: 459 AD

Geography
- Start point: Kala Wewa
- End point: Tissa Wewa

Yoda Ela (Giant Canal) or Jaya Ganga, an 87 km (54 mi) long single banking water canal carrying excess water to Tissa Wewa reservoir from Kala Wewa reservoir in Anuradhapura. The Yodha Ela is known for achieving a rather low gradient for its time. The gradient is about 10 centimetres per kilometre or 6 inches per mile.

== Construction ==
Yodha Ela was constructed during King Dhatusena's reign in 459 AD. It is 87 km (54 mi) long. It is a trans-basin diversion canal transferring water from Kala Oya Basin to Malwathu Oya Basin. It has a gradient of the order of 0.32 m (1.0 ft) drop along 1.61 km (1.00 mi). Even with modern day survey equipment it would be difficult to achieve such accuracy.

Yodha Ela not only feeds Tissa Wewa, but also the nearby Abhaya Wewa and Nuwara Wewa. A separate branch of the canal has then already brought water to the Nachchaduwa wewa.

King Parakramabahu who reigned the country from 1153 to 1186, expanded the area that contributed to the water in the canal by connecting more reservoirs to the network between Kala Wawa and Thissa Wawa. He then renamed it Jaya Ganga (River of Victory).

== Functions ==
Yodha Ela functions in a way of a moving reservoir because of its single banking aspect which is different from the present day double banking irrigation canals'. It feeds water in an area of 470 km^{2} (180 sq mi) feeding 4,630 ha (11,400 acres) of paddy lands and 120 small tanks on its way from Kala Wewa to Tissa Wewa

== See also ==
- Abhayavapi
- Dhatusena of Anuradhapura
- Kala Wewa
- Nachchaduwa wewa
- Parakramabahu I
- Tissa Wewa (Anuradhapura)
- Tank cascade system
