= Nachchaduwa wewa =

- නාච්චාදූව වැව (Sinhala)
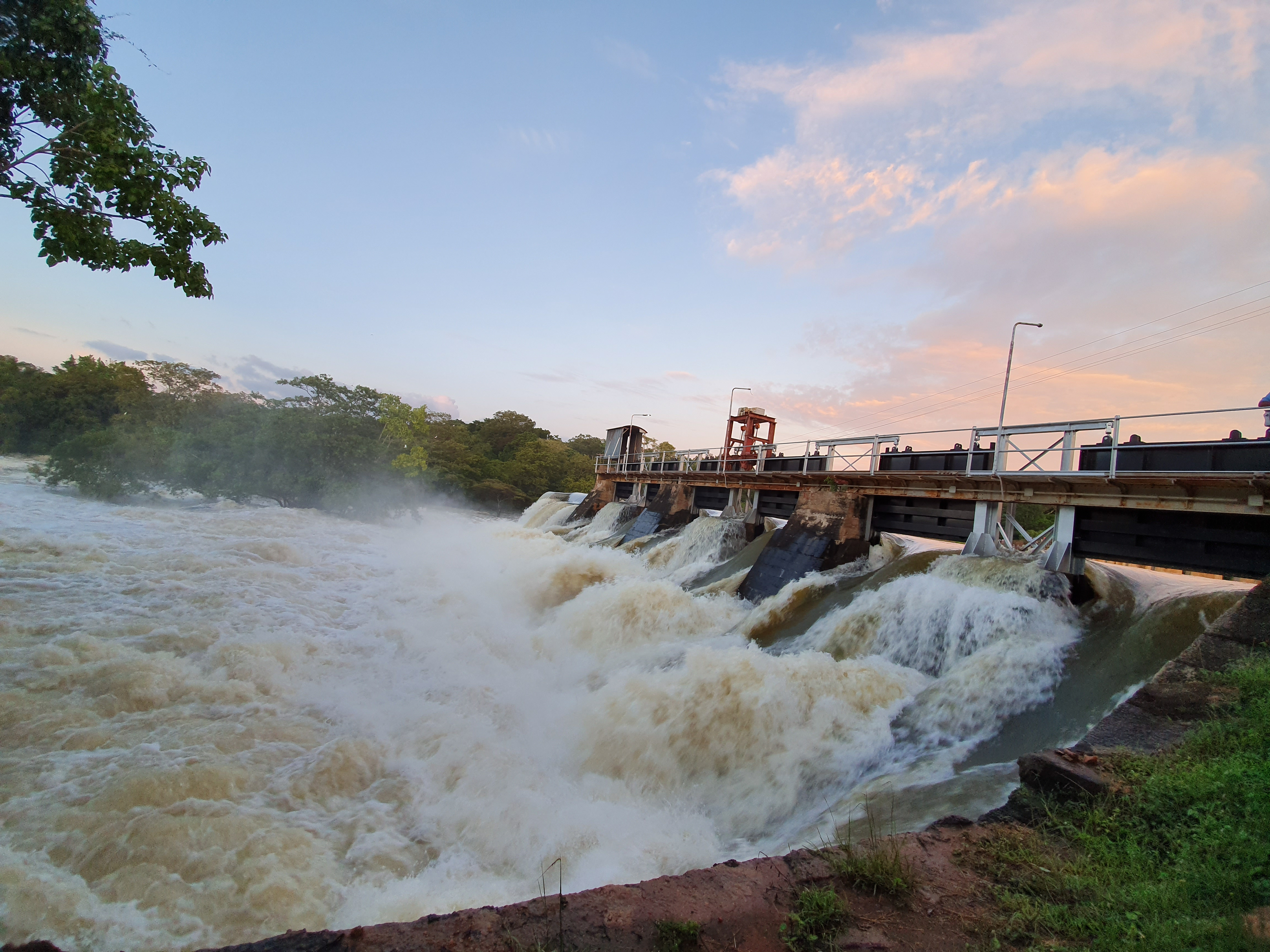
- Dam at Nachchaduwa wewa

- Location within Sri Lanka
- Location: Anuradhapura
- Coordinates: 08°15′09.8″N 80°29′05.5″E
- Type: Reservoir
- Catchment area: 623 km^{2} (241 sq mi)
- Water volume: 55,700,000 cu ft (1,580,000 m^{3})

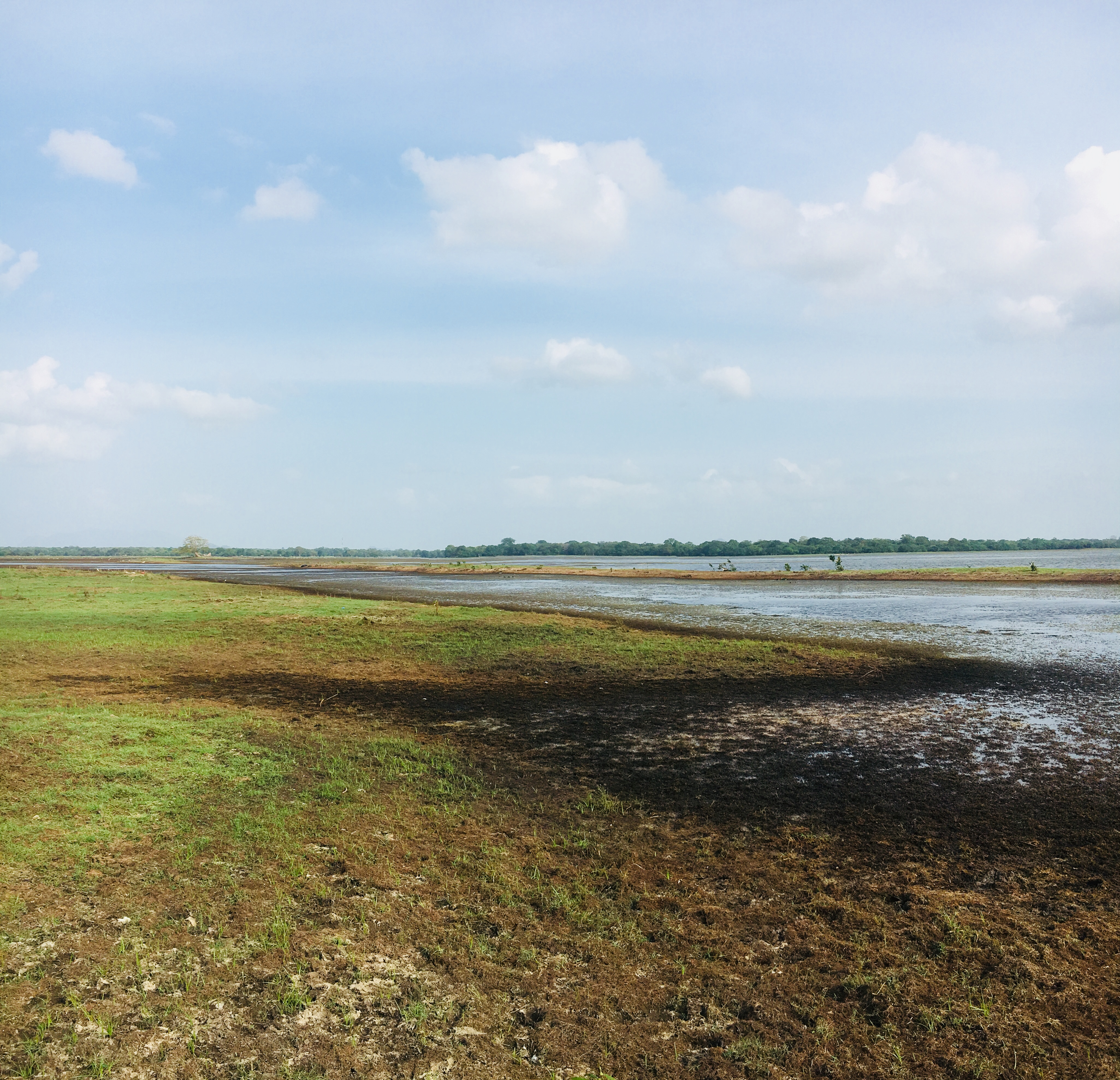
Nachchaduwa wewa

Nachchaduwa wewa (Also known as Mahadaragala Reservoir) is a reservoir near Thammannakulama, Sri Lanka. The reservoir is used to store water brings from Kala Wewa through Yodha Ela channel. The reservoir was severely damaged in 1957 flood and the restoration of the tank was completed in 1958.

== History ==
This tank is believed to be one of the sixteen large reservoirs built by King Mahasen (277 – 304). It is said that he built this tank to supply water to the city and to safeguard the city from floods. However the chronicle Mahavamsa have made a reference to this reservoir during the time of King Moggallana II (540 - 560).
