= Basawakkulama inscription =

The Basawakkulama inscription or Abhayavāpī inscription is a rock-cut record, from the time of king Mahanama (412-434), documenting some donations made to a Buddhist establishment named Nekari Vehera. The inscription is at Anuradhapura.

== Location ==
The inscription is reportedly incised on a rock about a quarter of a mile north of the spill of the Basavakkuḷama (Basawakkulama) at Anurādhapura. The Basavakkuḷama is reputed to be one of the earliest irrigation works in ancient Sri Lanka and anciently known as the Abhaya Wewa or Abhayavāpī.

== Publication ==
The inscription was first published in 1960 by Senarath Paranavitana as part of an article dealing with Sri Lankan history entitled "New Light on the Buddhist Era in Ceylon and Early Sinhalese Chronology," in the University of Ceylon Review, volume 20, pp. 129–55. However, by citing the Paranavitana's interpretation as a fabrication, Sirimal Ranawella published a revised edition of the inscription in 2009.

== Description and contents ==
The inscription is engraved on a rock surface, covering an area 4 ft. 7 in by 2 ft. 9 in. in 11 lines. The individual letters are 1 1/4 in. to 4 in. high. The purpose of engraving the inscription is to record the king's donation of land and two villages in the twenty-eighth year of his reign.

== Translation ==
Success. The mahārāja [*Upatissa], bearing the name ... [reading unclear], son of mahārāja Budadasa (=Buddhadāsa), having founded the Upatisa raja maha vihara (at a place) half a krośa ahead of the city gate, the gate of the archway, the gate of the watch-tower, and the monumental column, which he himself caused to be constructed, granted to this Doraka vihāra (=Dvāraka vihāra) the village of Diratigama and Dasagama for the benefit of the uposatha house and sixty karīsas of field from the Mahanelaka-vaḷa (in the village of) Kabota-agaṇa for the benefit of the Bodhi-shrine (having had these) acquired from the minister Nakaragal Keḷela, giving him the varupota of Kanaketa, and having (the grant) registered as perpetual in the administrative offices, on Tuesday the first day of the Duratu new-moon in the month of ...... in the twenty-eighth year of the raising of the umbrella (being) the year nine-hundred and forty one in the era of the Parinirvāṇa of the Blessed Buddha.

== See also ==
- Anuradhapura Kingdom § Irrigation and water management
- Irrigation works in ancient Sri Lanka
- Abhayavapi
