= Tank cascade system =

Ancient irrigation system in Sri Lanka

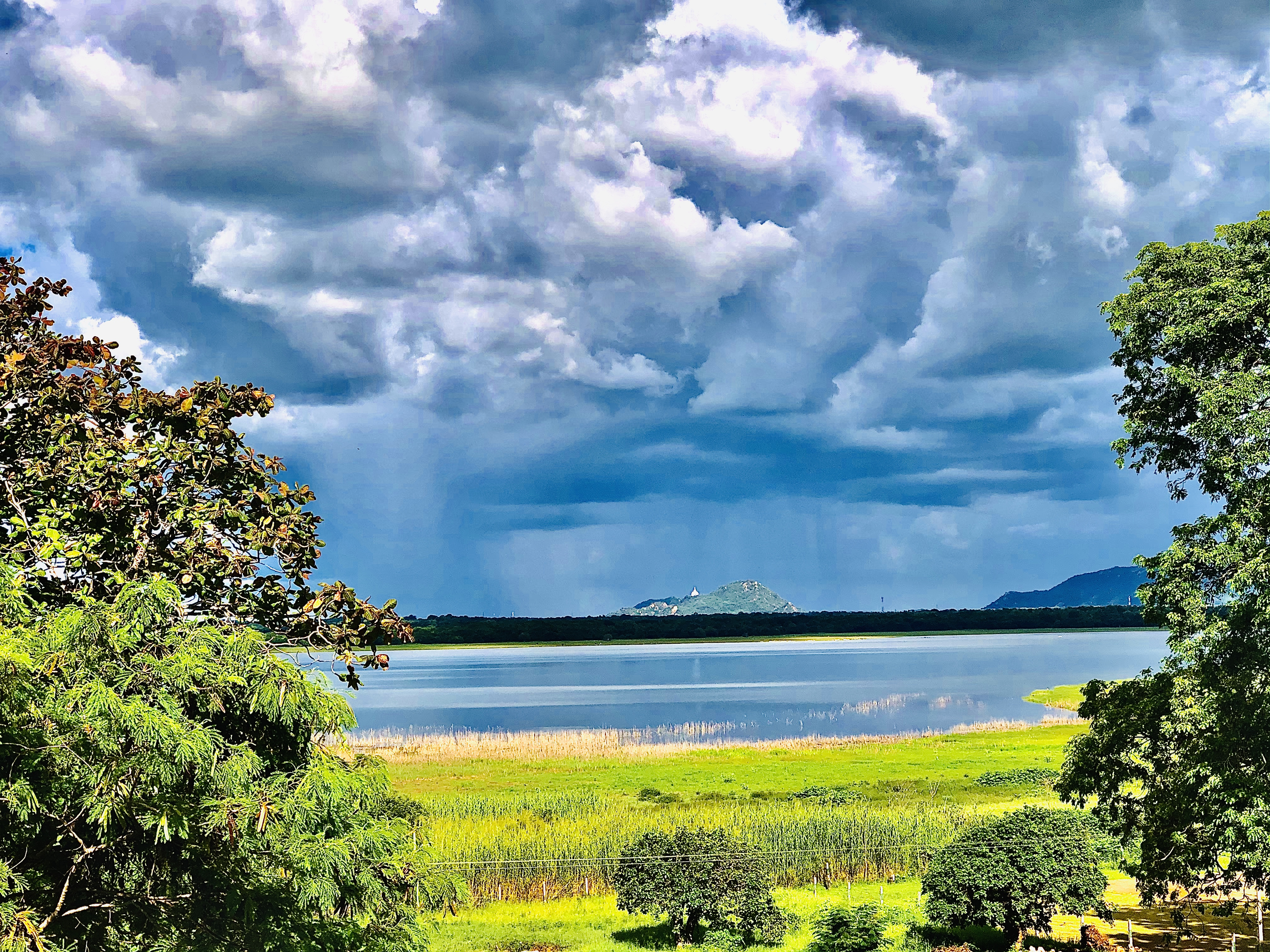
Rain clouds over a tank in Sri Lanka

The tank cascade system (Sinhala: එල්ලංගාව, romanized: ellaṅgāva) is an ancient irrigation system spanning the island of Sri Lanka. It is a network of thousands of small irrigation tanks (Sinhala: වැව, romanized: wewa) draining to large reservoirs that store rainwater and surface runoff for later use. They make agriculture possible in the dry-zone, where periods of drought and flooding otherwise make it difficult to support paddy fields and livestock.

Originating in the 1st millennium BCE, the system was designated as a Globally Important Agricultural Heritage System by the United Nations Food and Agriculture Organization in 2017. Centralized bureaucratic management of large-scale systems was implemented from the 3rd to the 13th centuries. Small-scale systems continued to be well-maintained up until the abolishment of compulsory labor, following British consolidation of control over the island. Efforts since independence to rehabilitate the tanks have resulted in much of the system being restored, as well as the addition and integration of new reservoirs. The reservoirs total to 2.7% of the country's surface area and have a significant effect on the ecology of the island.

== Etymology ==
A catchment site within the system is referred to as a wewa (වැව) in Sinhala, and this term is translated into English as "tank".

These tanks are connected in a series, referred to as a cascade, so that an ephemeral waterflow can be used, stored for future use, or conveyed elsewhere. The native term in Sinhala for a cascade is ellaṅgāva, which is a compound word combining ellaṁ ("hanging") and gāva ("next to one another").

== Geography ==
The tank cascade system is largely located in the semi-arid north-central section of the island, which experiences equatorial heat, limited freshwater, and erratic rainfall patterns. The monsoon cycle in the region, coupled with low water retention in the soils of the region, results in minimal groundwater storage capacity, high rates of evaporation, and low or variable precipitation, meaning that "in this hard rock region...no stable human settlement would have been possible without recourse to the storage of surface water in small tanks." Granite and charnockite underlie in this area, decreasing permeability. The "undulating topography" of the island's dry zone is also appropriate for pond or reservoir construction, with small dams being able to create large reservoirs.

Overall, Sri Lanka has 80 major dams and 18,000 extant tanks, down from an estimated 30,000 tanks in ancient times. Between 10,000 and 14,000 tanks are in active use as irrigation sources; the majority of these hold water in the north-central lowland dry zone. The total surface area of all reservoirs in Sri Lanka was estimated in 1988 to be 175,774 hectares (1,758 km^{2}), 2.7% of the country's area. Of this, 39,000 hectares (Note: This is 390 km^{2}, 0.59% of the country's area and 22.2% of the total reservoir surface area.) correspond to just 44 major ancient reservoirs.

== History ==
Whereas the agriculture of Fertile Crescent arose from stored water in low bottomland soil, and the agriculture of ancient Egypt was dependent on retained Nile River flood waters, ancient Sri Lankans used a chain of reservoir systems as their water source. Sri Lanka has been called a "hydraulic civilization." Similar ancient water engineering projects in tropical and subtropical climates include the qanats of Iran, oases in the Near East and North Africa, and the Gurganj Dam of Amu Darya.

Researchers theorise that the evolution of the tank cascade began with rain-fed agriculture and then became increasingly sophisticated beginning with diverting rivulets, then permanent rivers, followed by a leap forward with the construction of spillways, weirs and ultimately sluices, then the construction of reservoirs, until, at the apogee of development, ancient Sri Lankans were able to successfully dam up perennial rivers and use the water as they saw fit. Historic uses of the tank cascade system included human needs (drinking water, sanitation, food production), ecosystem enrichment, urban development, administrative boundary setting ("water cordons"), and natural disaster mitigation.

Rainwater reservoirs were being constructed on the island as early as 300 BCE—there are assertions that Sorabora Wewa in Mahiyangana was constructed by the yaksha spirits before the theory postulated as the Indo-Aryan migration to the island—and an estimated total of 30,000 tanks have been built over the history of Sri Lanka.

The existence of what is now called the tank cascade system is recorded in the Dīpavaṃsa and the two Mahāvaṃsa chronicles, which describe tanks, ponds, water holes, dams, canals, irrigation funding grants, irrigation income, irrigation taxes, and irrigation laws.

An estimated 15,000 tanks were built between 300 and 1300 CE, during the Anuradhapura Kingdom (437 BCE–845 CE) and Polonnaruwa kingdom (846 CE–1302 CE) eras. Sri Lankan irrigation engineers of this period were supposedly summoned or hired by other kingdoms for their expertise. Without these tanks, ancient Anuradhapura would not have been able to develop and flourish, as it is located in a dry area.

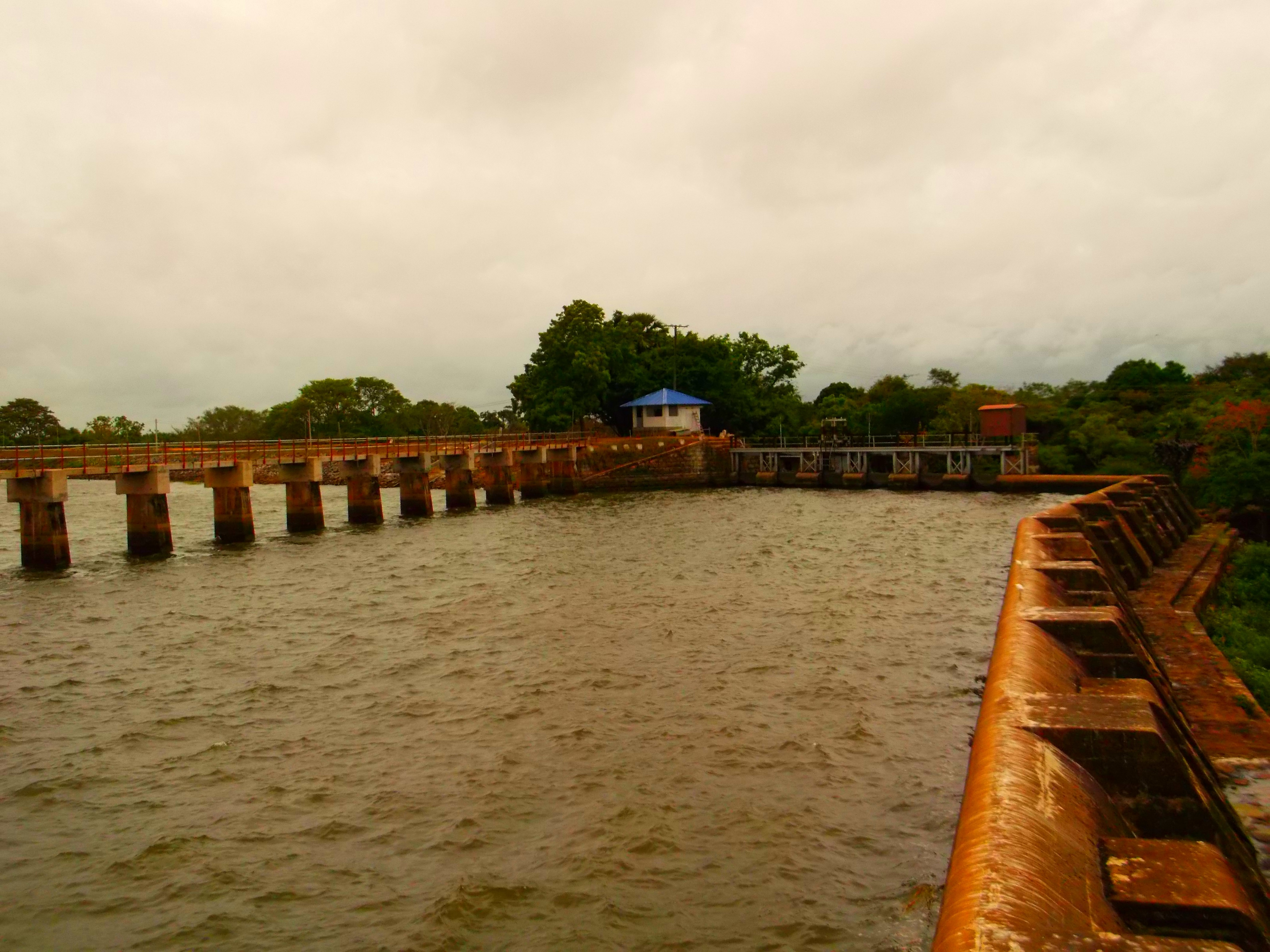
Nachchaduwa reservoir, located just outside Anuradhapura, is thought to be one of the 16 large reservoirs built by King Mahasena (276–303 CE).

In the 9th century, bureaucracy to organise the irrigation system included a committee known as the Twelve Great Reservoirs.

The most famous surviving exemplars of the irrigation infrastructure used by Sri Lankan elites are the Abhayavapi rainwater reservoir in Anuradhapura built by Pandukabhaya (437–366 BCE) and the "lion rock" fortress Sigiriya, a UNESCO World Heritage Site. The only source of water at Sigiriya (which sits 360 meters above the surrounding plain) is rainwater, which was cunningly managed through a network of pools, underground channels and drains.

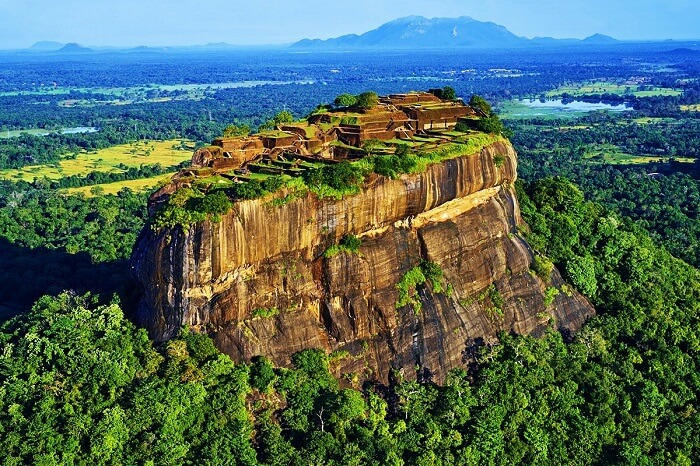
Sigiriya fortress’ sophisticated water management systems date to the 5th century CE.

Other historic landmarks of Sri Lanka water engineering include the lion pond of Mihinthale, the stone lotus pond of Polonnaruva, and the architecture of Kumara Pokuna, the royal baths of Parakramabahu the Great.

Let not even one drop of water that falls on the earth in the form of rain, be allowed to reach the sea without being first, made useful to man.

— Parākramabāhu I (~1123–1186), Kingdom of Polonnaruwa

Thousands of modest tanks with hyperlocal catchment areas were built at the same time as "the larger and more impressive network of irrigation systems that [were]…controlled and directed by the kings and other higher echelons of the irrigation bureaucracy." The extensive tank cascade infrastructure incorporated local and regional Buddhist monasteries by providing them with their own irrigation access and related incomes. In contemporary Sri Lanka, "Buddhist monks of any given village…are often consulted on water management decisions and lead agro-based cultural festivities."

Eventually the tank cascade system entered a period of decline and partial abandonment. Maintenance of the system between the 1200s and the 1700s CE, considered the "dark ages of tank civilization," is poorly understood. Very little is known of this period as the historical record is thin, but the Rājākariya labour system may have been involved. Dutch colonial administrators (1640–1796 CE) mostly concerned themselves with cultivation of coastal areas and lucrative crops like cinnamon and seem to have ignored the inland tank cascade systems. During the British colonial period, the Rājākariya system was abolished and the tank cascade system seemingly suffered as a result.

In the late 1800s CE an effort was made to reclaim and reorganise the surviving remnants of the tank cascade system; water sluices were replaced on several hundred tanks, and restoration projects were initiated for larger elements including Yodha Ela canal, Kala Wewa tank, Kantale tank, Giant's Tank and Minneriya-Elahara. British records also tell of village irrigation managers creating sluices from hollow tree trunks or clay pots turned pipes.

The Sri Lankan Department of Agricultural Services has overseen irrigation-management groups, called Farmers Organizations, since 1979. Sri Lanka's current water management plan seeks to preserve the ecosystem and cultural benefits of the system while making large-scale investments in drinking water systems, sewage treatment plants, and commercial-industrial water infrastructure. In addition to the tank cascade system, surface irrigation has been used on the island since the mid-20th century. One source says "the tanks have been largely untouched since the 1970s with the development of large irrigation and hydropower schemes."

Similar historic tank cascade systems can be found in Tamil Nadu state in southern India and West Bengal state in eastern India.

== Hydrology and function ==
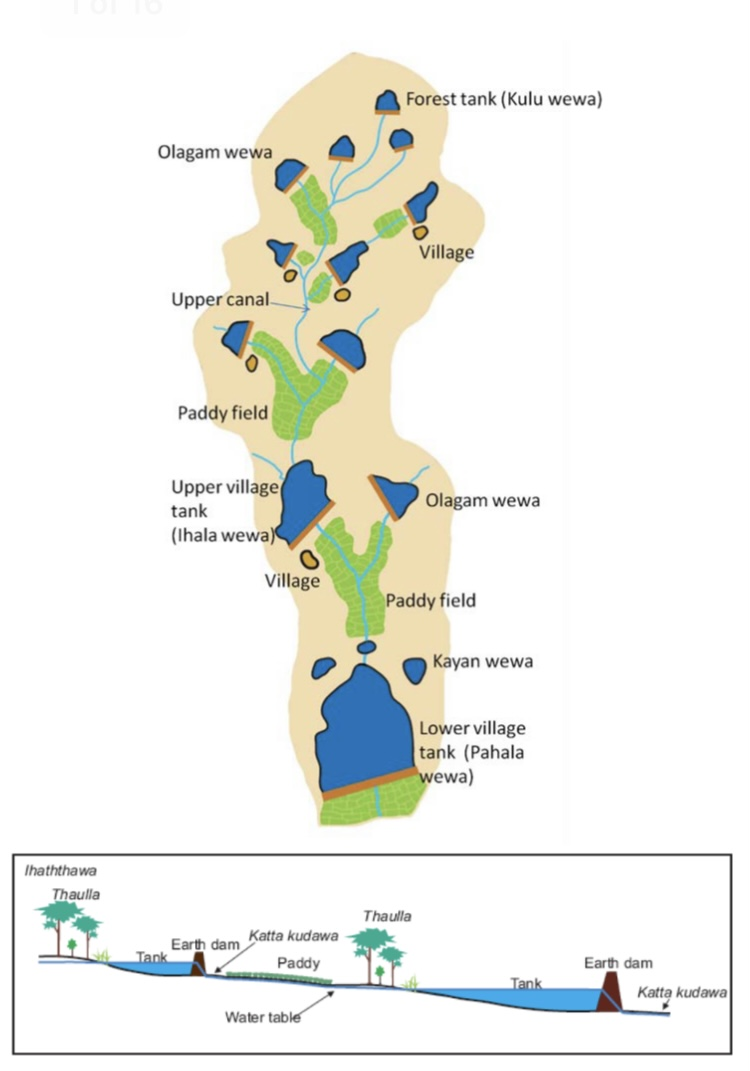
Tank cascade system diagram, aerial and elevation views

Village tanks and cascades are "naturalized" and generally built with permeable natural materials rather than concreted in place. Tanks can be any size from small vernal pools to huge perennial lakes "thousands of hectares in surface area."

These tanks are connected into a series, the "cascade" or ellaṅgāva, so that an ephemeral waterflow can be used, stored for future use, or conveyed elsewhere. The water flows through channels and spillways within a small or medium-sized drainage area (called kiul ela and ranging in size from 13 to 26 km^{2}, with an average size of 20 km^{2}.).

The cascade network draws from or serves to a variety of reservoirs: pahala wewa (village tank), kulu wewa (forest tanks), pin wewa (temple tanks), olagam wewa (supplementary tanks), ilaha wewa (storage tanks), et al. Tanks are edged with earthen embankments (or bund) called wekandas with integrated water gates called kuto sorowwas, horowwas (sluice) or bisokotuwas (valve pit) that release water into the canal system. The extent or expanse of water in the reservoir is called diyagiluma; the “dry lakebed” or “meadow” or parkland that the cascade potentially fills with water is wew pitiya. Village livestock congregate at the wew pitiya in the dry season. The upland stream channels are called diya para, the drainage channel exiting a village tank and paddy field is called kiwul ela.

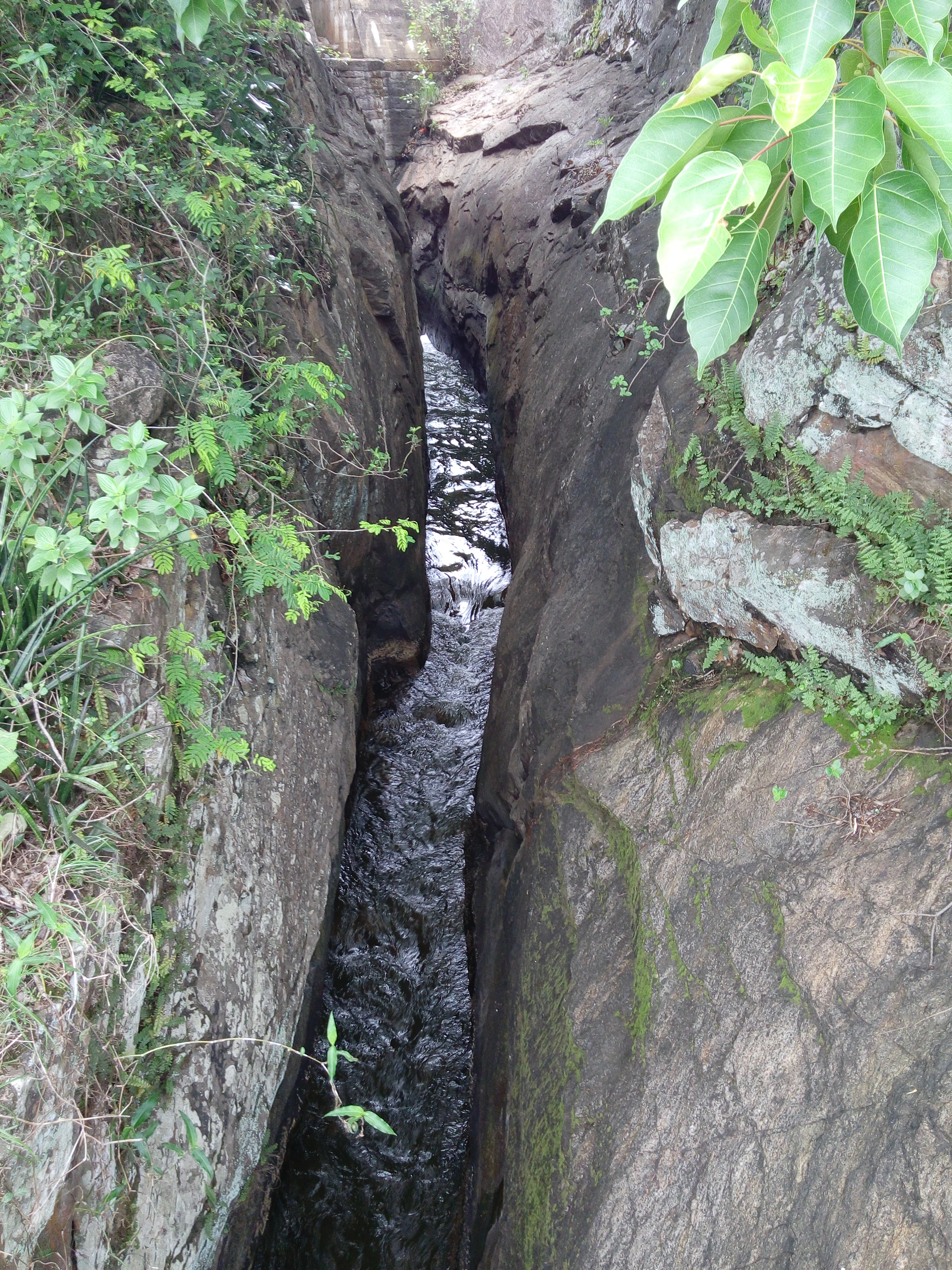
The sluice gate of Sorabora Wewa is made of stone; it is the only one of its kind in Sri Lanka.

The upstream edge of the tank is usually planted with a protective treeline called gasgommana and a reed bed for filtration, called perahana; the downstream edge is planted with biodiverse "interceptor" vegetation called kattakaduwa, intended as a bioremediation trap for salts and other contaminants. The gosgommana may be planted with indigenous species including Bassia longifolia, Terminalia arjuna, Crateva adansonii and Diosoyros malabarica. Herbs and medicinal plants are grown in the upper thaulla area of the system, and vegetables are often grown on the mounded barriers that separate paddy fields.

Some upstream elements of the system were designed to trap sediment that could eventually block the canals, while other upstream "forest tanks" serve as watering holes to keep wildlife out of the human water supply. Still other tank elements are engineered to recharge the aquifer. Studies of similar tank cascade systems in India found that they increase well recharge by 40 per cent and decrease surface runoff by 75 per cent.

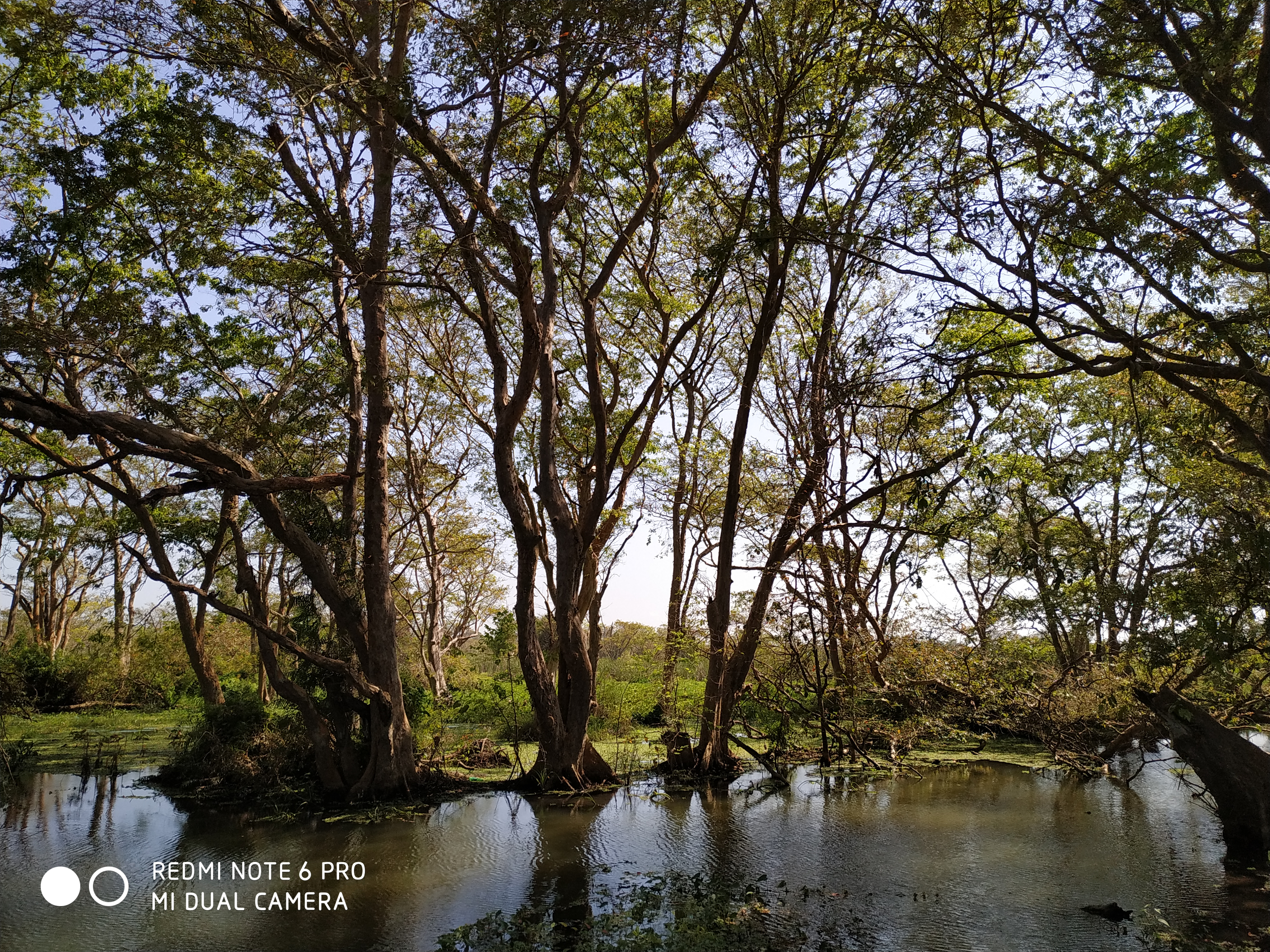
Kumbuk trees on a tank bund: "Healthy forest ecosystem in strategic locations upstream and upwind of tanks protect against evapotranspiration and increased siltation"

The cascade network can be understood as an integrated, human-managed ecosystem "where water and land resources are organized within the micro-catchments of the dry zone landscape, providing basic needs to human, floral and faunal communities through water, soil, air and vegetation."

== Use ==
The system remains an important part of the modern Sri Lankan irrigation network, and supports much of the agriculture in the country. The stored water is mainly used for paddy field cultivation of Asian rice (Oryza sativa). The paddy fields are called wela; the fields closest to the water gate are called purara wela or purana vela, depending on transliteration (meaning old fields). The purara wela were originally communal. Fields further away are called akkara wela (acre field), and were often developed during the European colonial period, are privately owned, and have a less favourable water supply.

The farmers of the Sri Lankan paddy fields originally grew heritage rice varieties like Suwandal but have now largely transitioned to Green Revolution strains of rice.

There are more than 7,500 village-scale (Note: which have an "irrigated command area of 80 ha or less, as defined by the Agrarian Services Act No. 58 of 1979.") tanks in use today, along with many other reservoirs that are either larger or that are no longer used for traditional purposes.

Locals coordinate water use through Farmers Organizations and "appoint a person called Jala Palaka [water controller], who is supposed to release water according to the requirement of the farmers and the domestic users. The normal practice is that the water controller retains some water in the tank for domestic purposes."

Village water management practices vary and depend on the social structure of the community and "locally evolved" systems.

Historic village tanks had strict codes surrounding the use of the various bodies of water in the tank cascade system, with designated areas for bathing, cleaning, watering animals, laundry and so forth. In many districts, the village tank system provides drinking water through well recharge; the existence of a small to moderately sized tank raises the groundwater levels in the immediate environment. Farmers capitalise on this by digging a series of wells near the tank body, which they use to extract water for drinking and washing.

Larger reservoirs may have buildings or huts built along the shore, and may be used for freshwater fishing, hunting or poaching, and lotus flower picking, in addition to the typical agricultural and pastoral uses.

Development agencies hope that revitalising the system could both mitigate some of the negative effects of climate change and restore some of the comity lost to the Sri Lankan Civil War, although the system (which originated during a golden age of the Sinhalese culture) may be less nostalgic for neighbours of Tamil ethnicity or Muslim faith.

=== Kidney disease ===
Some districts of Sri Lanka have epidemic rates of Chronic Kidney Disease of Unknown Etiology (CKDu). Pollution of groundwater by chemical-agricultural runoff is a suspected factor; men are more likely than women to develop the condition.

Kidney disease rates are highest in areas that use water diverted from the Mahaweli River.

== Ecological and sociological dimensions ==
Benefits of the tank cascade system include creating cooler microclimates that serve as wildlife habitats, encouraging biodiversity through the establishment of many ecological niches and ecotones, and establishing conditions for a "unique decentralized social system in Sri Lanka where farmers have held the highest social rank."

The tanks and connecting channels are used as water sources and habitat by both domestic livestock and indigenous wildlife, including Sri Lankan elephants.

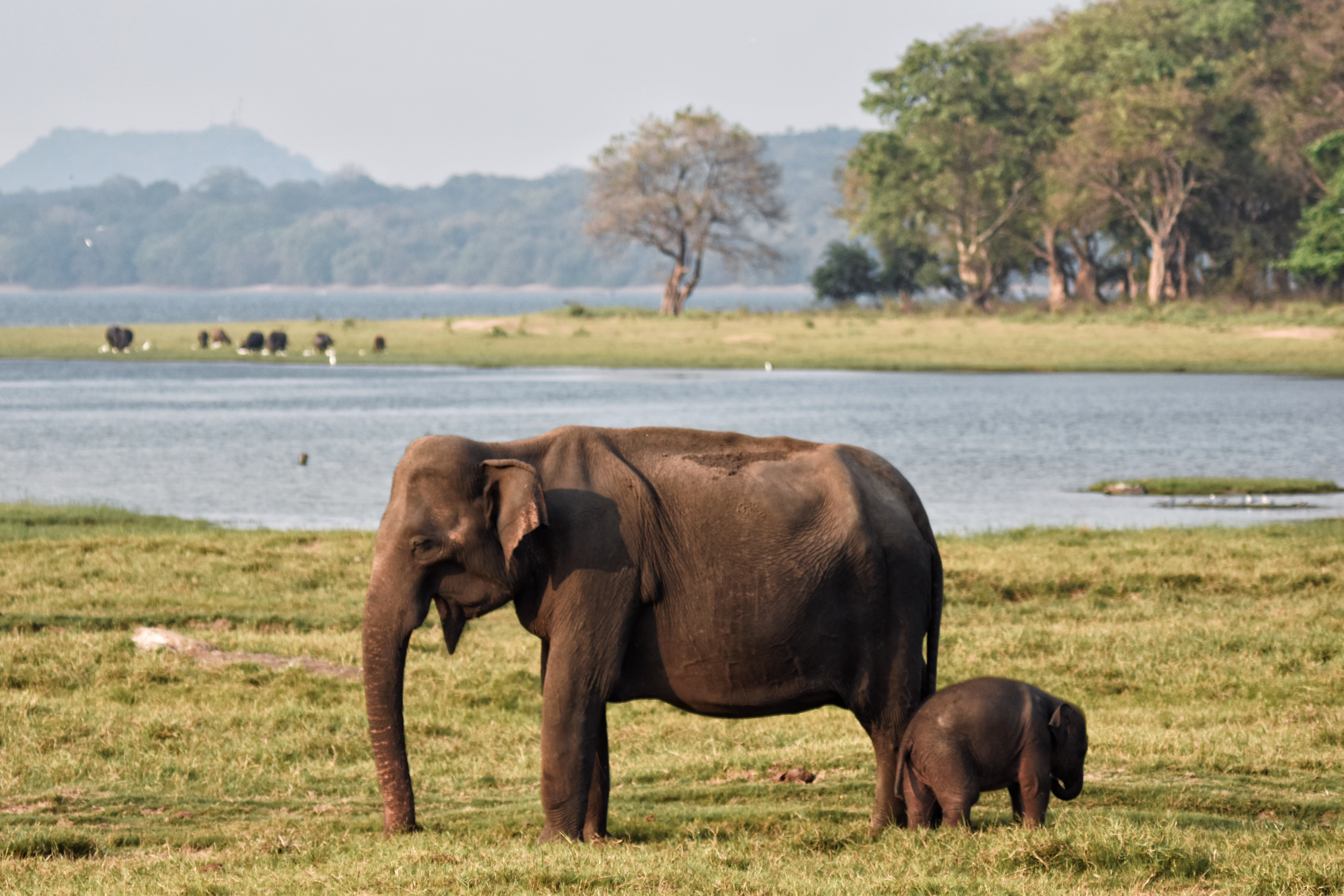
Elephant and calf visit Minneriya tank

A biodiversity survey of just one tank cascade system in the Malwathu Oya river watershed found that it supported approximately 400 plant and animal species.

The local tank cascade systems persisted and stabilised local communities even when changing regimes on the national level led to the decline of the "large-scale centrally managed" tank cascade systems.

Farmers who were interviewed about their relationship with the tank cascade system referenced the Theravada Buddhist principle of Pratītyasamutpāda, suggesting that the "concept of a plurality of causes directly underpins the interconnected eco-systems approach that farmers of the tank cascade system apply to water."

Active restoration of a tank cascade system to historic standards can be observed at Alisthana at the 112-kilometre post on A9 road.

== Gallery ==
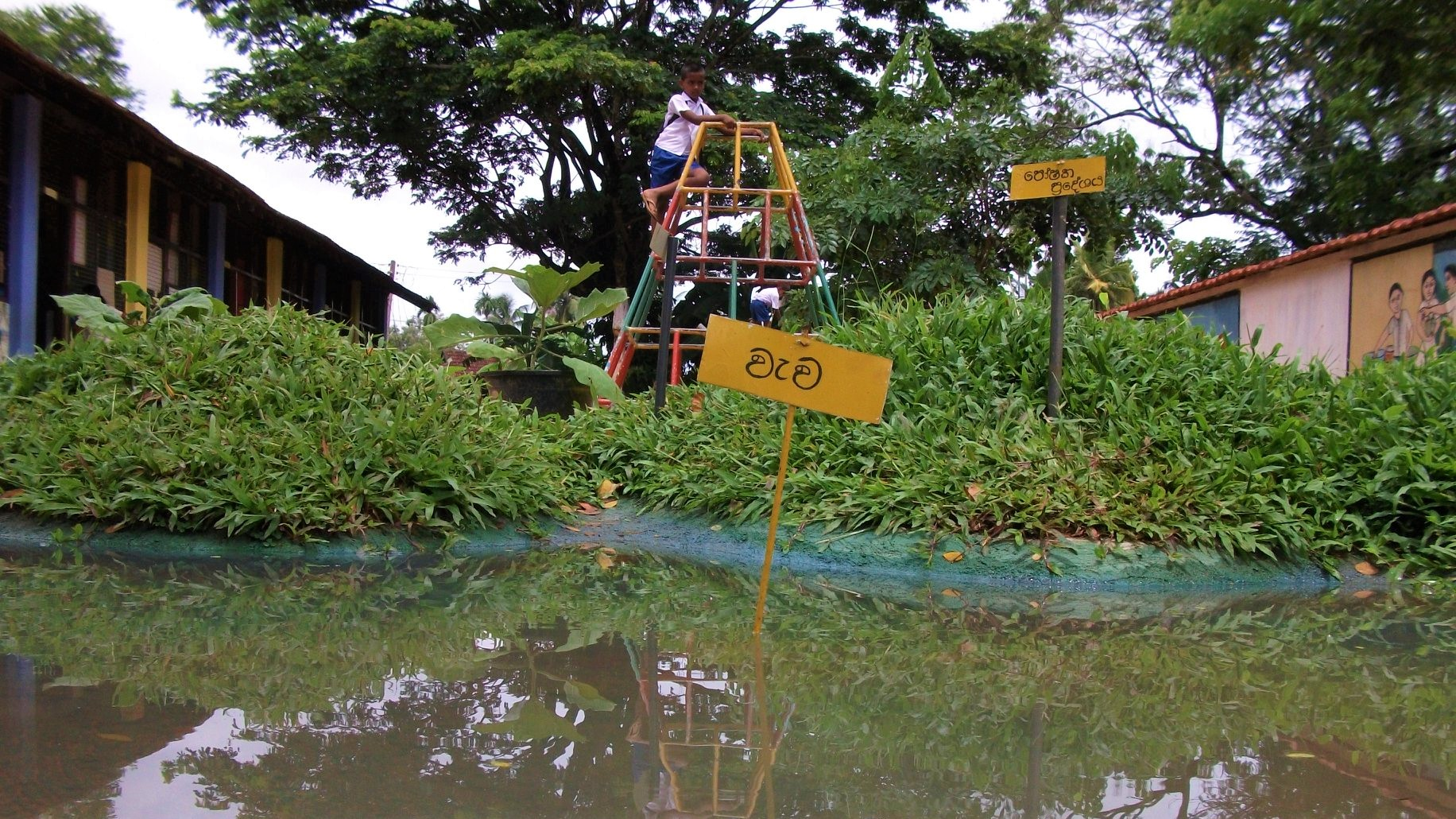
Structure of an ancient tank

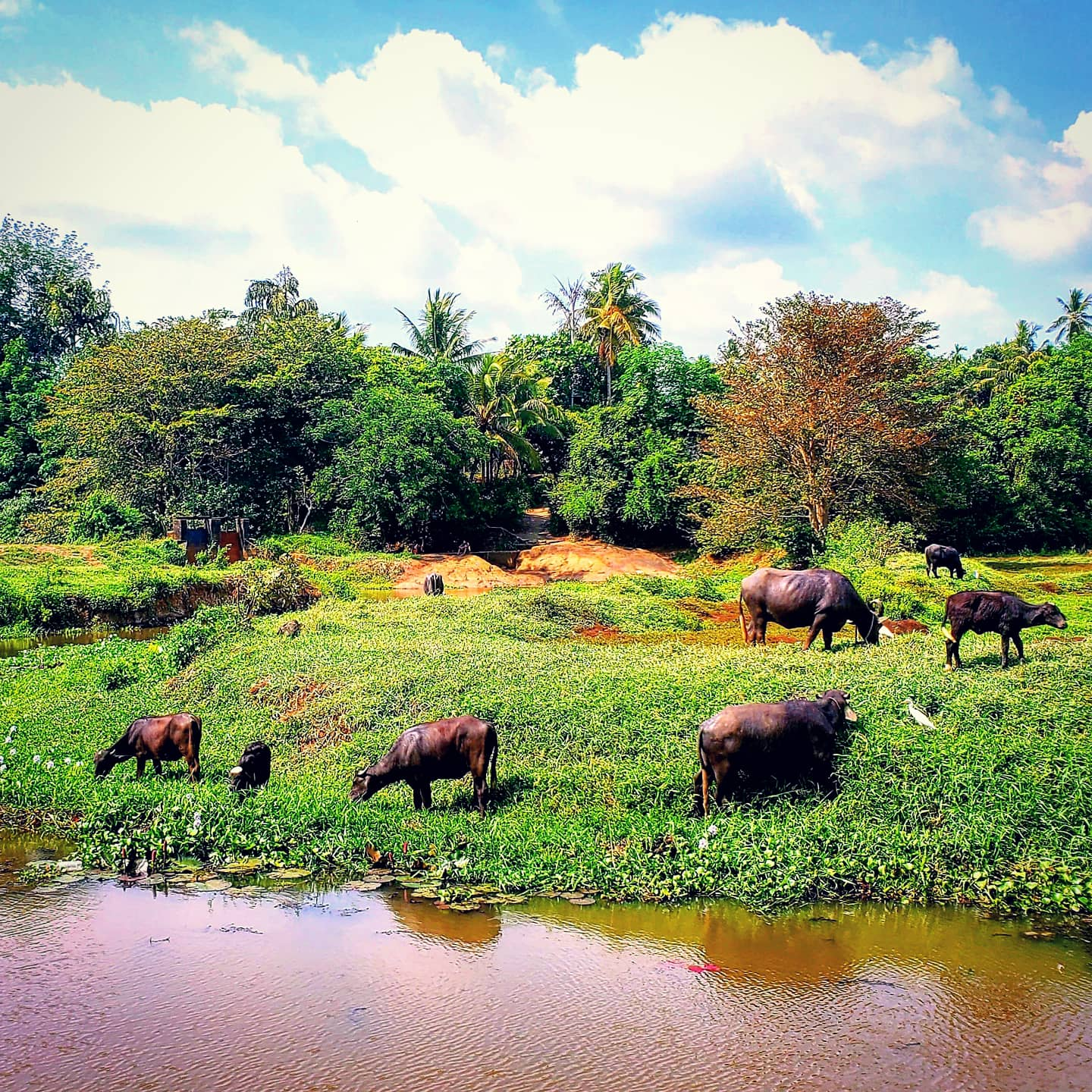
Paddy fields with water buffalo

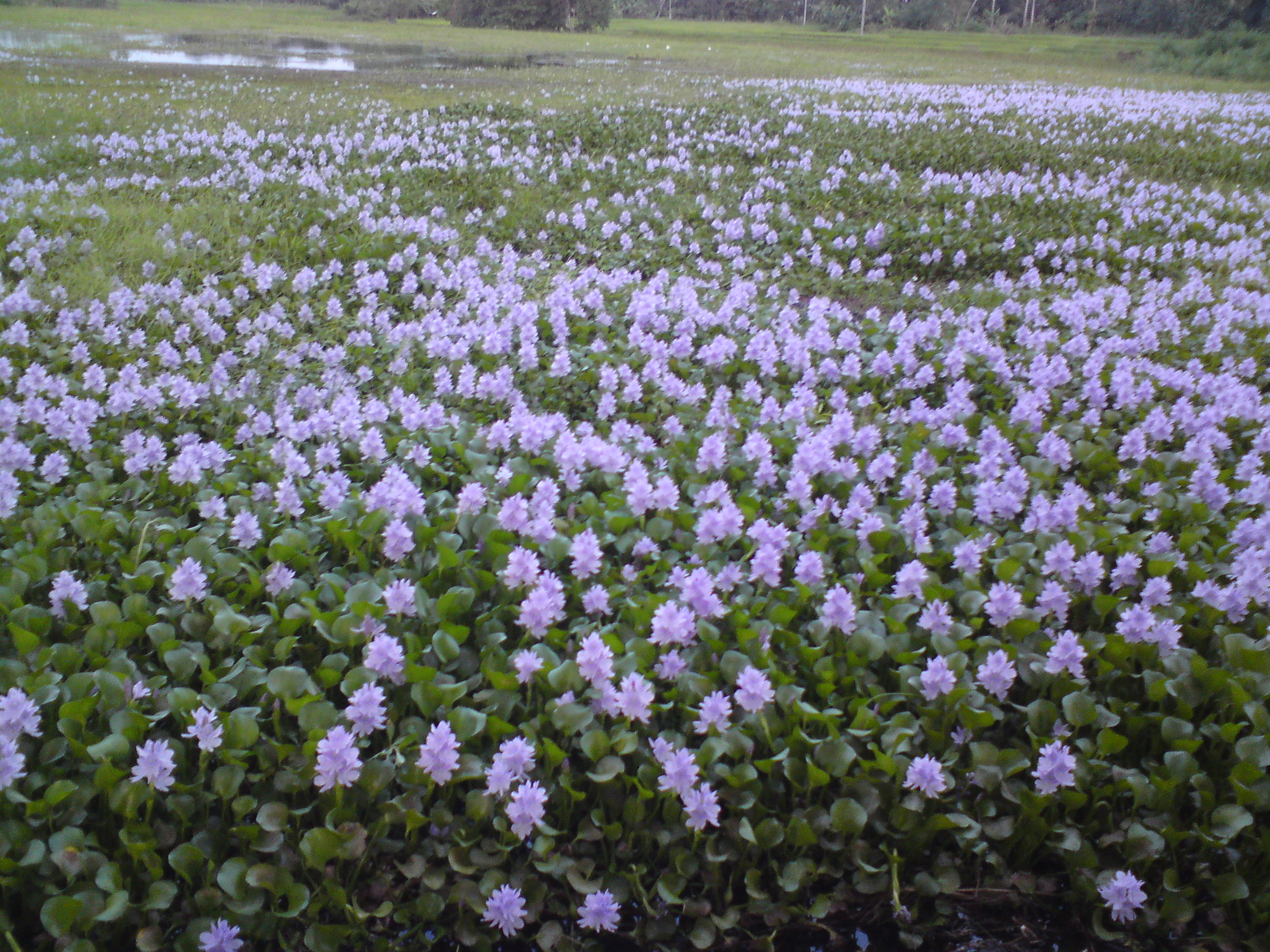
Purple flowers growing near a tank in Kurunagala

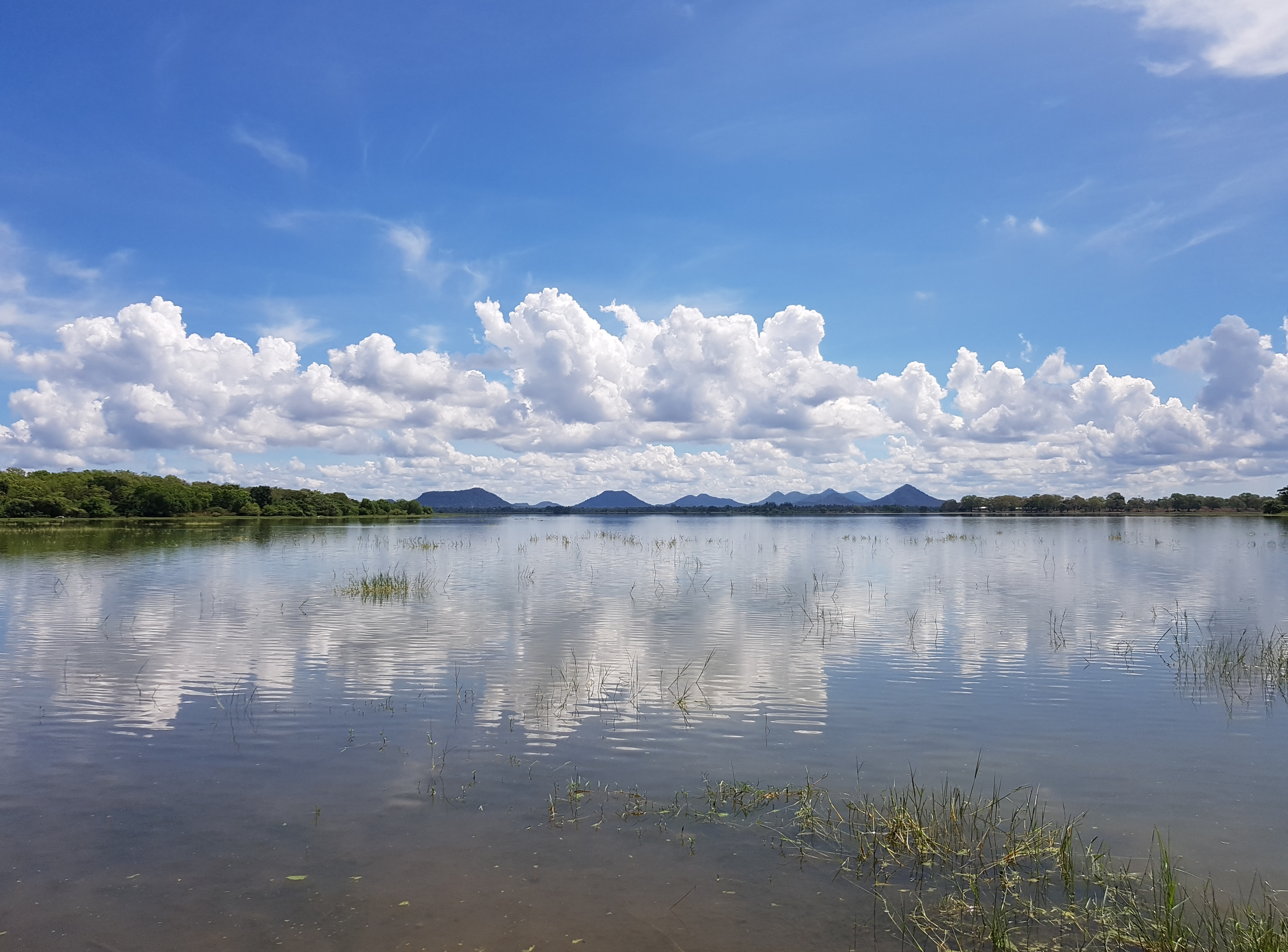
Weerawila tank

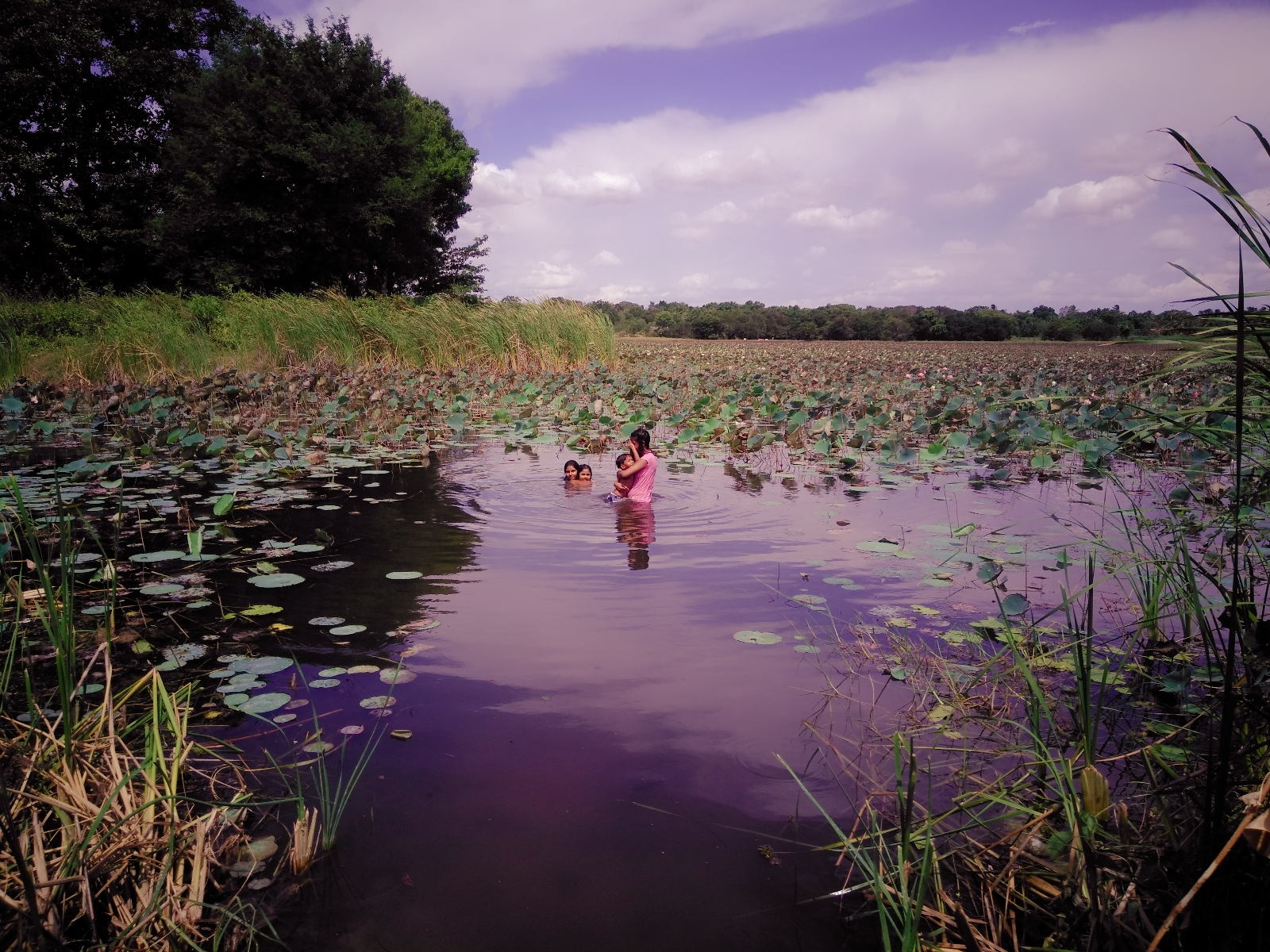
Family swimming at Ashwayabedi Wewa

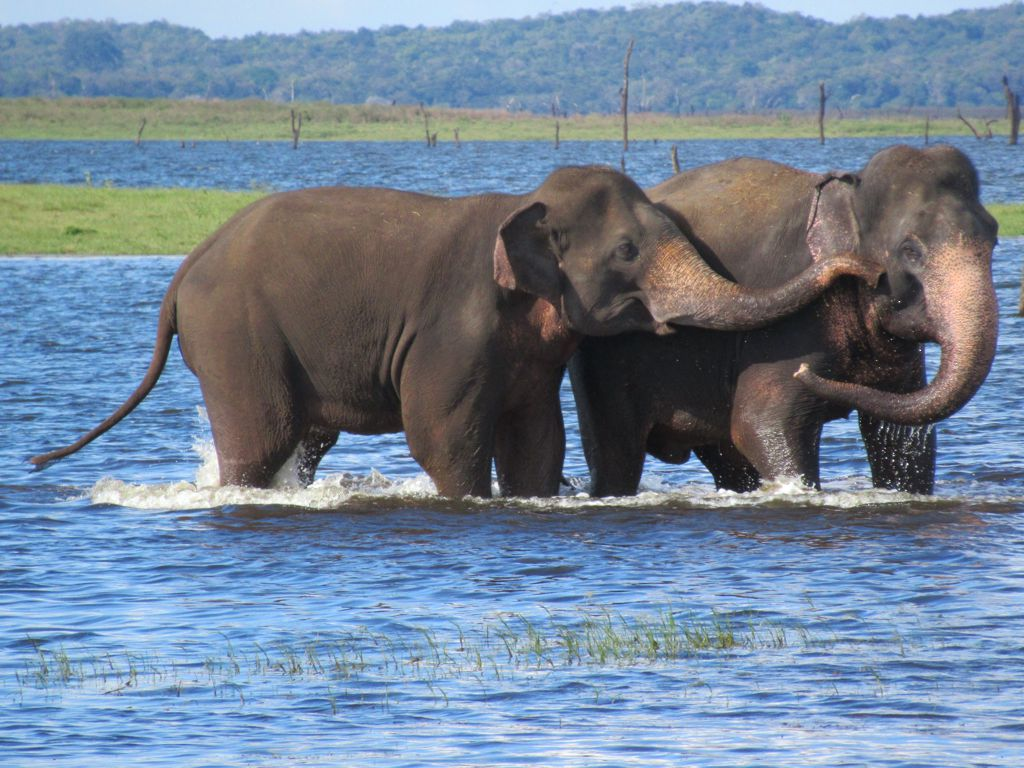
Elephants in Kaudulla Wewa at Kaudulla National Park

== See also ==
- Qanat (Middle East and North Africa)
- Johad (Northern India)
- Shushtar Historical Hydraulic System (Iran)
- Minneriya National Park
- Yala National Park
- Kaudulla National Park
- Pidurangala Vihara
- Sri Lanka dry-zone dry evergreen forests
