= Thammannakulama =

Town

Coordinates: 8°14′N 80°08′E

Thammannakulama or Thammannkulam located in Anuradhapura, Sri Lanka, is the largest town in the city of Anuradhapura. Anuradhapura Airport located near Thammannakulama. Nuwara Wewa is situated in the middle of Thammannakulama. Modern Anuradhapura City was created by the people of Thammannakulama, and is a Buddhist town.

== Ancient City ==
As the heart of Anuradhapura, Thammannakulama attained its highest magnificence around the commencement of the Christian era. In its prime it ranked beside Nineveh and Babylon in its colossal proportions — its four walls, each 16 miles (26 km) long, enclosed an area of 256 square miles (663 km²) — in the number of its inhabitants, and the splendour of its shrines and public edifices. The city also had some of the most complex irrigation systems of the ancient world. Situated in the dry zone of the country the administration built many tanks to irrigate the land. Most of these tanks still survive. To date, it is believed that some of these tanks are the oldest surviving reservoirs in the world today.

== Growth of City ==
The city's popularity grew both as a ritual centre and as an administrative centre. A large population was attracted to the city for permanent settlement. Thus living facilities were improved to accommodate the expanding population. King Vasabha constructed many ponds which were fed by a network of subterranean channels constructed to supply water to the city. The Tissa and Abhayavapi tanks were built, Nuwara weva was built and the Malwatu Oya was dammed to build the Nachchaduwa wewa of 4,408 acres (17.84 km²).

== Notable people ==
- King Buddhadasa
