= Rājākariya =

Rājākariya (Sinhala language: King's work) was a form of land tenure practiced in the native kingdoms in the island of Sri Lanka. The practice allows for the King who owns all land in the kingdom, to grant land in exchange for services. These services can be either labor for public works such as road, building or irrigation and for special services based on caste related occupations. Its last form was practiced in the former Kingdom of Kandy under the British administration until it was abolished in 1832 under the administrative and economic reforms following recommendations of the Colebrooke–Cameron Commission.

With the termination of Rājākariya in 1832, the communal farmwork that kept local irrigation tanks in good repair from time in memorial ended with no replacement resulted in the tanks wasting aware into general decay, leading to several dams breaching in 1837 and subsequent famines.

== See also ==
- Serfdom in Russia
