= Kala Wewa =

Twin reservoir complex in Sri Lanka

Coordinates: 8°01′N 80°31′E

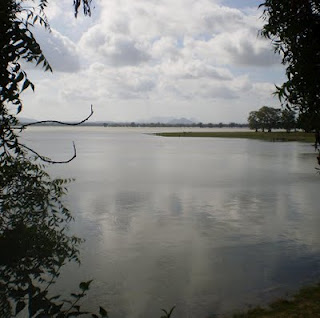
- Interactive map of Kala Wewa
- Location: Anuradhapura District, Sri Lanka
- Type: Reservoir
- Primary outflows: Transferred water to Thisa Wewa via Jaya Ganga
- Basin countries: Sri Lanka
- Surface area: 7 square miles (18.1 km²) at full capacity
- Water volume: 123 million cubic meters (4 billion cubic feet)
- Shore length^{1}: 40 miles (64.4 km)
- ^{1} Shore length is not a well-defined measure.

Kala Wewa (Sinhala:කලා වැව), built by King Datusena in 460 CE, is a reservoir complex consisting of two reservoirs, Kala Wewa and Balalu Wewa. It has the capacity to store 123 million cubic meters of water. The reservoir complex includes a stone made spillway and three main sluices. The main central sluice, 40 feet wide, supplies water to thousands of acres of paddy fields and ends at Tissa Wewa, in the ancient city of Anuradhapura, having meandered over 87 km (54 mi) at a slope of 6 inches per mile. The hydraulic engineering reflects the advanced technology that existed in ancient Sri Lanka.

== History ==
This reservoir was built by King Dhatusena, who ruled the country from 454 to 473 CE.

Tamil invaders who arrived from South India ruled the north part of the country during the period from 429 to 455 CE. King Dhatusena repelled the invaders and united the country. He wanted to rebuild the irrigation system by constructing several tanks and canals in and around the city of Anuradhapura.

After the construction of Kala Wewa was completed, the king built another tank called Balalu Wewa (Sinhala: බලලු වැව) nearby and connected the two tanks together, with the resulting combined tank being the largest in Sri Lanka. King Mahinda II, who ruled the country from 777 to 797 CE, expanded the tank further. Water of the tank was transferred to Tissa Wewa (Sinhala: තිසා වැව) in Anuradhapura by an ancient 54-mile (86.9 km) canal, Yodha Ela (Sinhala: යෝධ ඇල), with an average gradient of 6 inches per mile (9.5 cm/km) over the first 17 miles (27 km).

== Legends ==
King Dhathusena was very keen on information with regard to a spot very suitable to construct a tank to be the massive one in the history of Sri Lanka. There are some folklore on how the king was able to find a place for the tank he imagined. There was a man called Kadawara who left his family and went to live in the jungle due to his wife's unbearable and repeated insults and disrespects towards him. After some years in the jungle he was well accustomed with wild animals and lived with a flock of deer. One day a hunter suddenly noticed this strange man living with animals in the jungle; went to the palace and told the king that it seems that this strange man lives in the forest in order to guard an unknown treasure there. King sent his army to catch him. Kadawara was caught and brought to the palace. When the king questioned him of the treasure, Kadawara revealed his true story and told real reason for his leaving the city and living in the jungle. Then king asked him of any interesting thing he had seen while living in the jungle. Kadawa said, "No sir, I have not seen anything interesting but in a brook somewhere in the jungle, water is being blocked by the flora called Kala that has been grown across that stream. According to this legend, it was the spot wherein the king created the Kala Wewa.

== Renovation ==
First restoration to the tank is done by King Parakramabahu I in the 12th century. The tank was renovated several times in the past as in the period of British Governor Sir William Henry Gregory (1872–1877 and Sir Arthur Hamilton-Gordon (1883–1890). After the British rule in the country and in 1958, the tank's bund was reconstructed connecting the tank with Balalu Wewa.

== Size ==
Its circumference is 40 miles (64.4 km) and has a total area of 7 square miles (18.1 km^{2}) at full capacity. Length of the dam is 22,572 feet (6,879.9 m) and the height is 48 feet (14.6 m).

== Attraction ==
There is a 12 meter high standing statue of Buddha created by same ruler. This statue is named after the village it is situated so it is called Avukana Buddha statue (Sinhala: අව්කන බුදු පිළිමය) and it can be seen over-looking at the tank near by.

== Purpose ==
The reservoir served as one of largest irrigation tanks in ancient time. While supplying water also for the small tanks in rural areas on the way, the canal Jaya Ganga carried water from Kala Wewa and stored enough water in the Thisā Wewa for the population of then capital city of Anuradhapura.well

Being one of main storages in the Mahaweli Irrigation Scheme since 1976, the tank serves to the population in the North Central Sri Lanka. It is used for fresh water fishing and the flora, specially the grasses in its valley, is the main sources of silage for the herds of cattle in the area.

== Route ==
The way to Anuradhapura via Dambulla reaches Kekirawa in the Kekirawa Divisional Secretariat and from there the distance to the tank is 9.7 kilometres (6 mi).

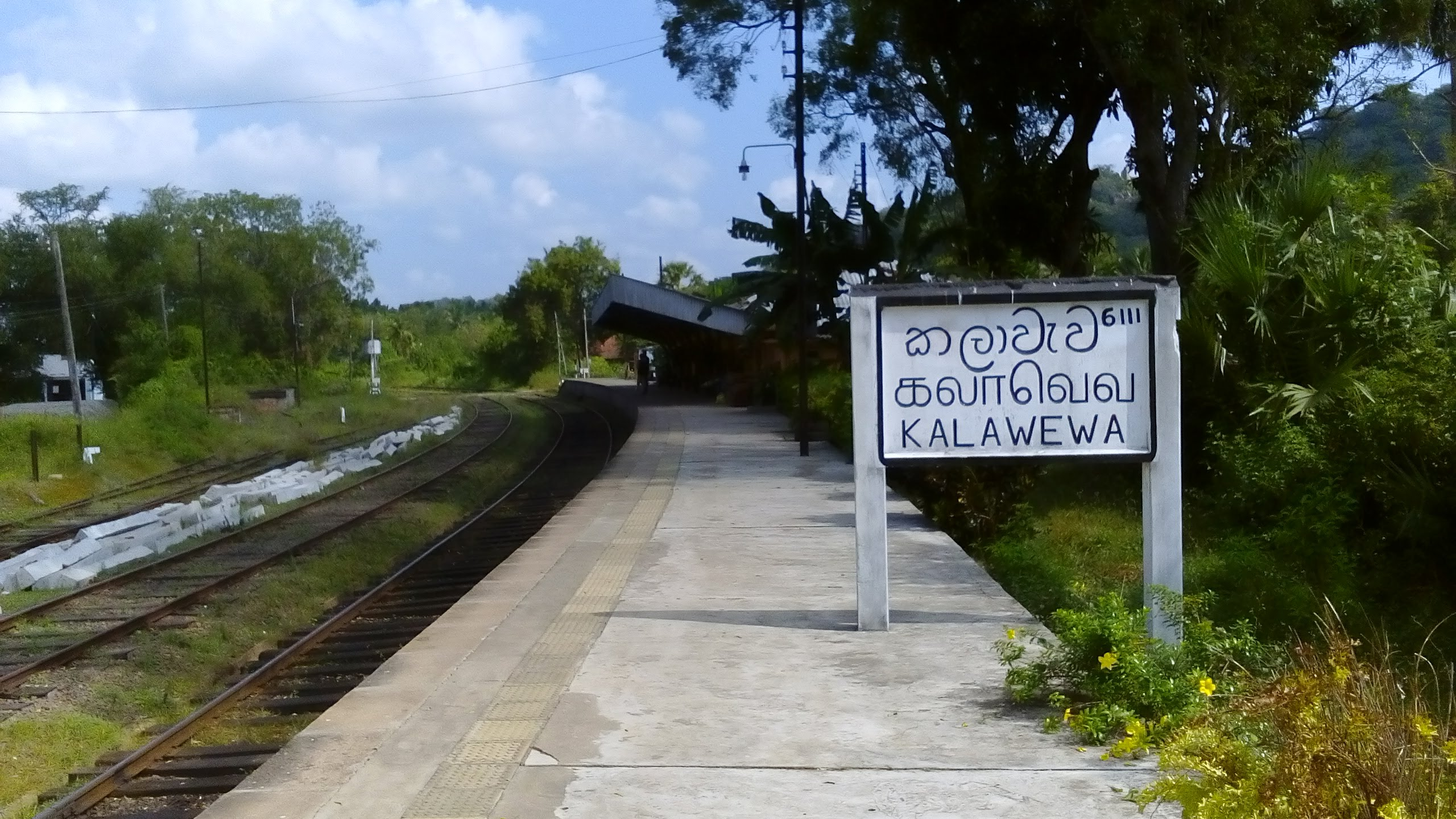
Kalawewa Railway Station

Kalawewa Railway Station can be reached by train from Colombo Fort to Trincomalee or from Colombo Fort to Batticaloa via Maho Junction Railway Station.

== See also ==
- Dhatusena of Anuradhapura
- Yodha Ela (Jaya Ganga)
