= Sri Lankan irrigation network =

Historic irrigation works in Sri Lanka

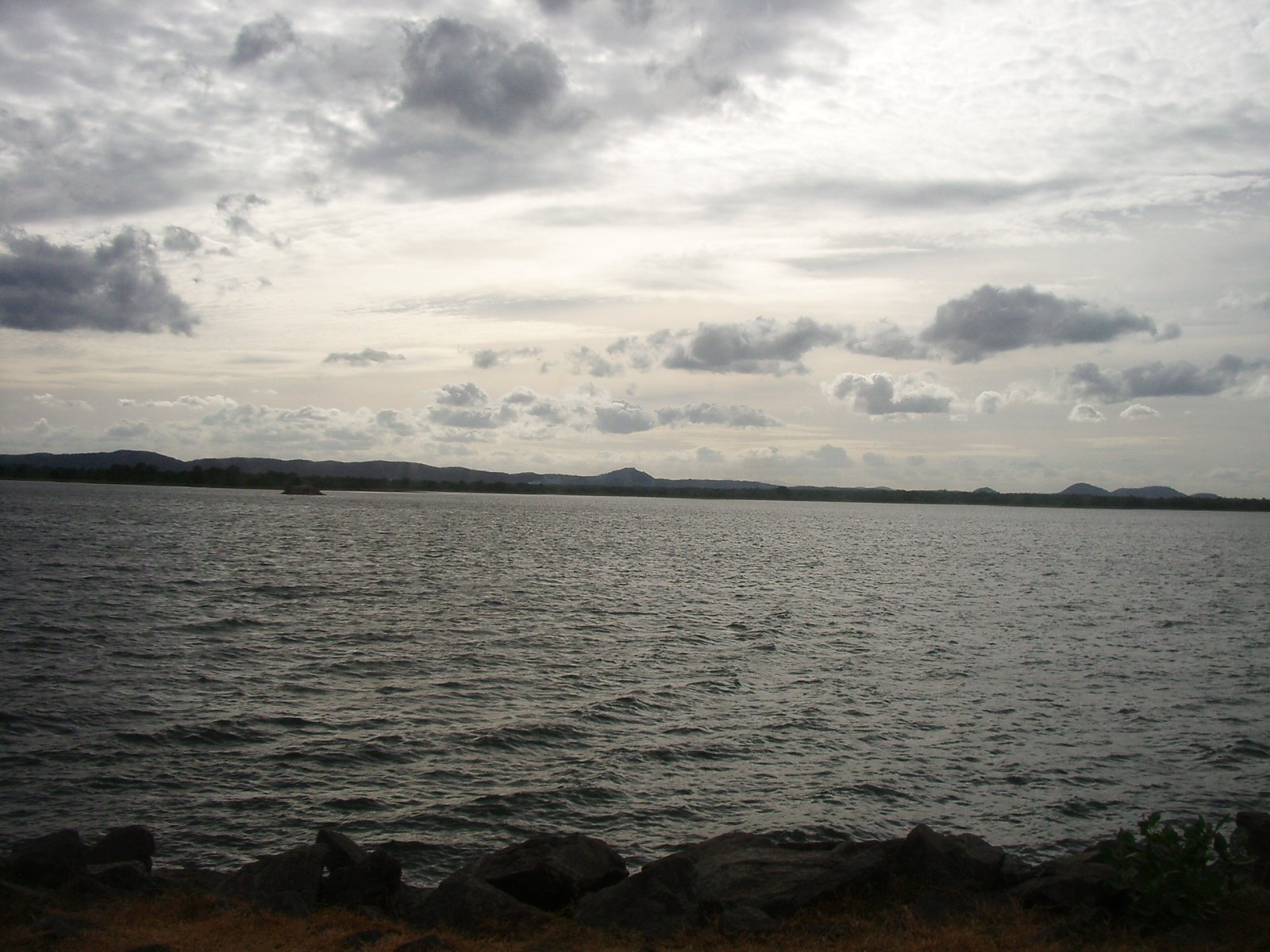
Parakrama Samudra, an ancient reservoir in Polonnaruwa.

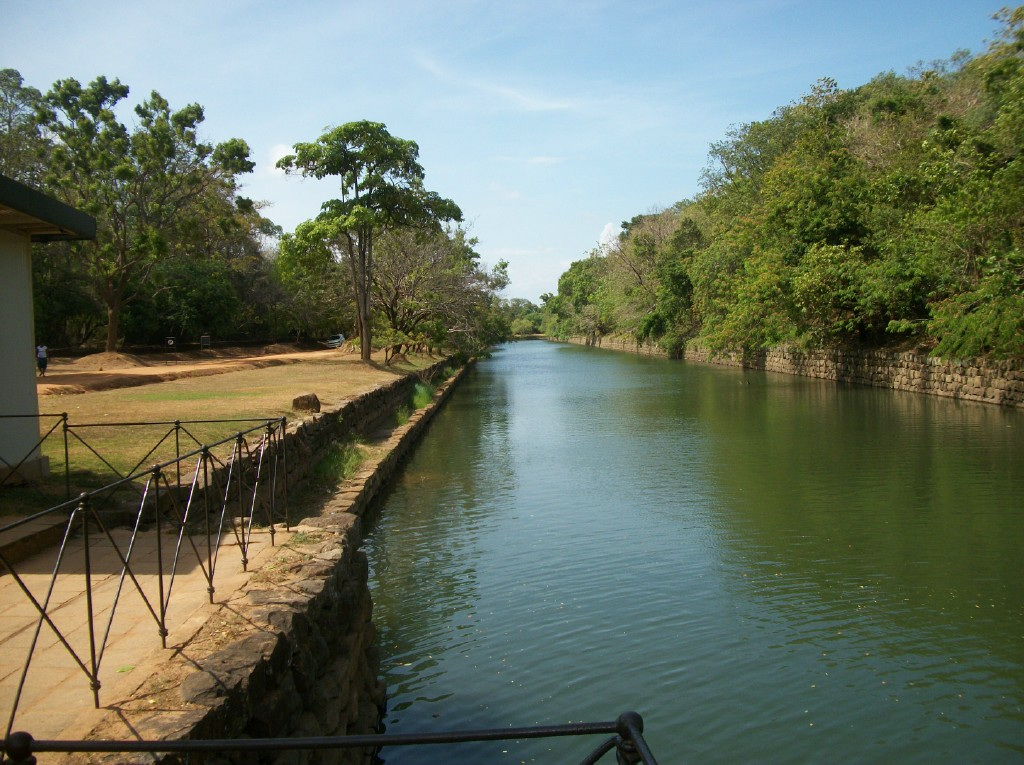
Moat surrounding Sigiriya.

The irrigation works in ancient Sri Lanka were some of the most complex irrigation systems of the ancient world. The earliest examples of irrigation works in Sri Lanka date from about 430 BCE, during the reign of King Pandukabhaya, and were under continuous development for the next thousand years. In addition to constructing underground canals, the Sinhalese were the first to build completely artificial reservoirs to store water, referred to as tanks (Sinhala: වැව, [ʋæʋə], romanized: wewa). The system was extensively restored and further extended during the reign of King Parākramabāhu (1153–1186 CE).

The first tank which can be identified with certainty was built by King Pandukabhaya, who reigned from 437 to 367 BC. It is said that he had three tanks built, namely Abhaya Wewa, Gamini Wewa, and Jaya Wewa. Of these, only one, Abhaya Wewa, can be identified with an extant tank, Basawakkulama Wewa. Long after King Pandukabhaya, King Parākramabāhu I had many tanks built, with one large tank called Parakrama samudraya still providing significant water for agriculture. Many rulers of Sri Lanka contributed to the development and construction of tanks all over the Raja Rata, the northern part of the country. Some tanks were either individually - owned or granted on lease.

== See also ==
- Anuradhapura Kingdom: Irrigation and water management
- Ancient constructions of Sri Lanka
- Henry Parker
- Tank cascade system
