= Abhaya Wewa =

Ancient reservoir in Sri Lanka

Abhaya Wewa අභය වැව
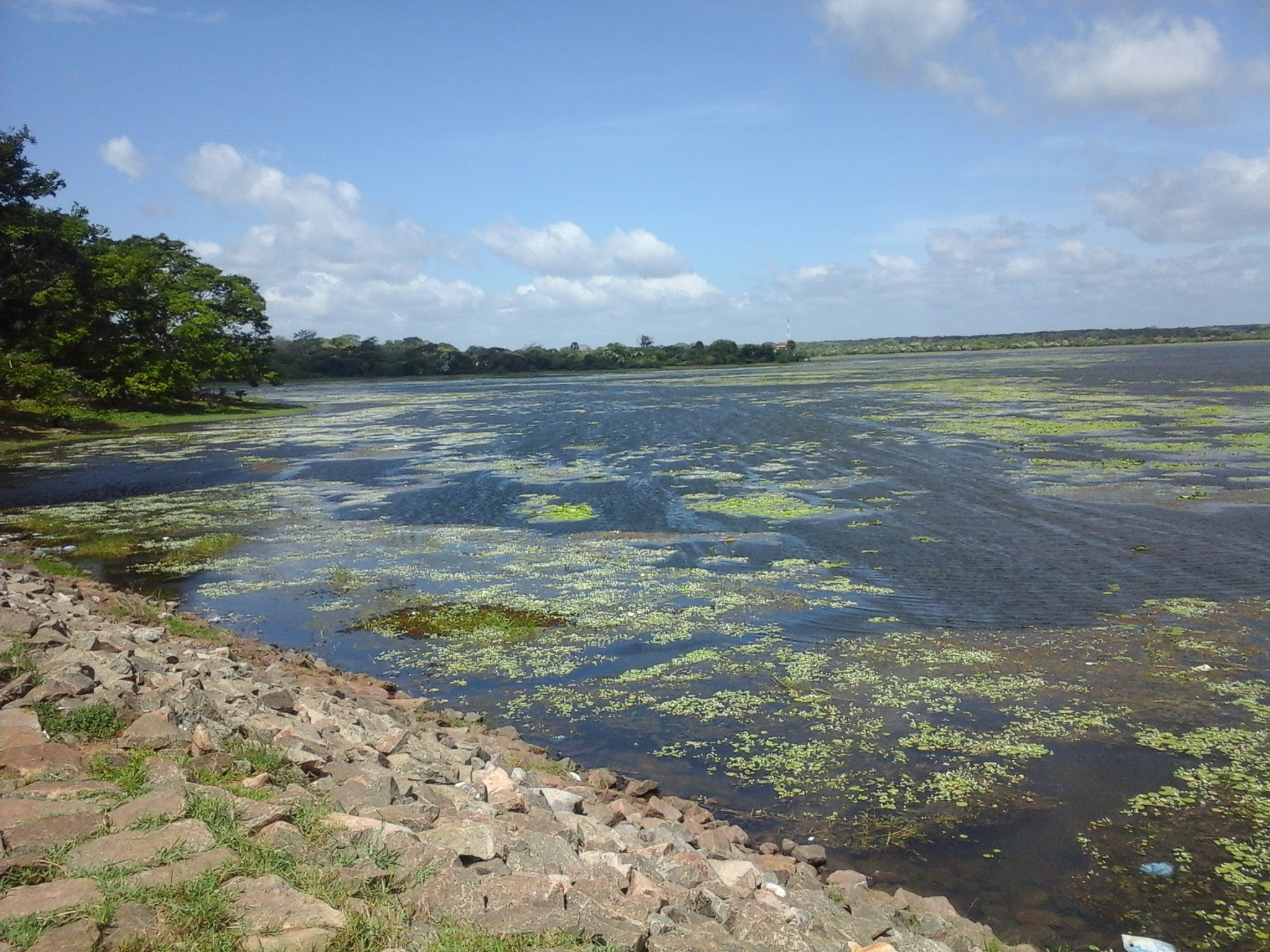

- Location within Sri Lanka
- Location: Anuradhapura
- Coordinates: 08°21′07.9″N 080°23′17.4″E
- Type: Reservoir
- Built: 400 BC
- Surface area: 1,235 acres (500 ha; 1.930 sq mi)
- Water volume: 133×10^{6} cu ft (3.8×10^{6} m^{3})

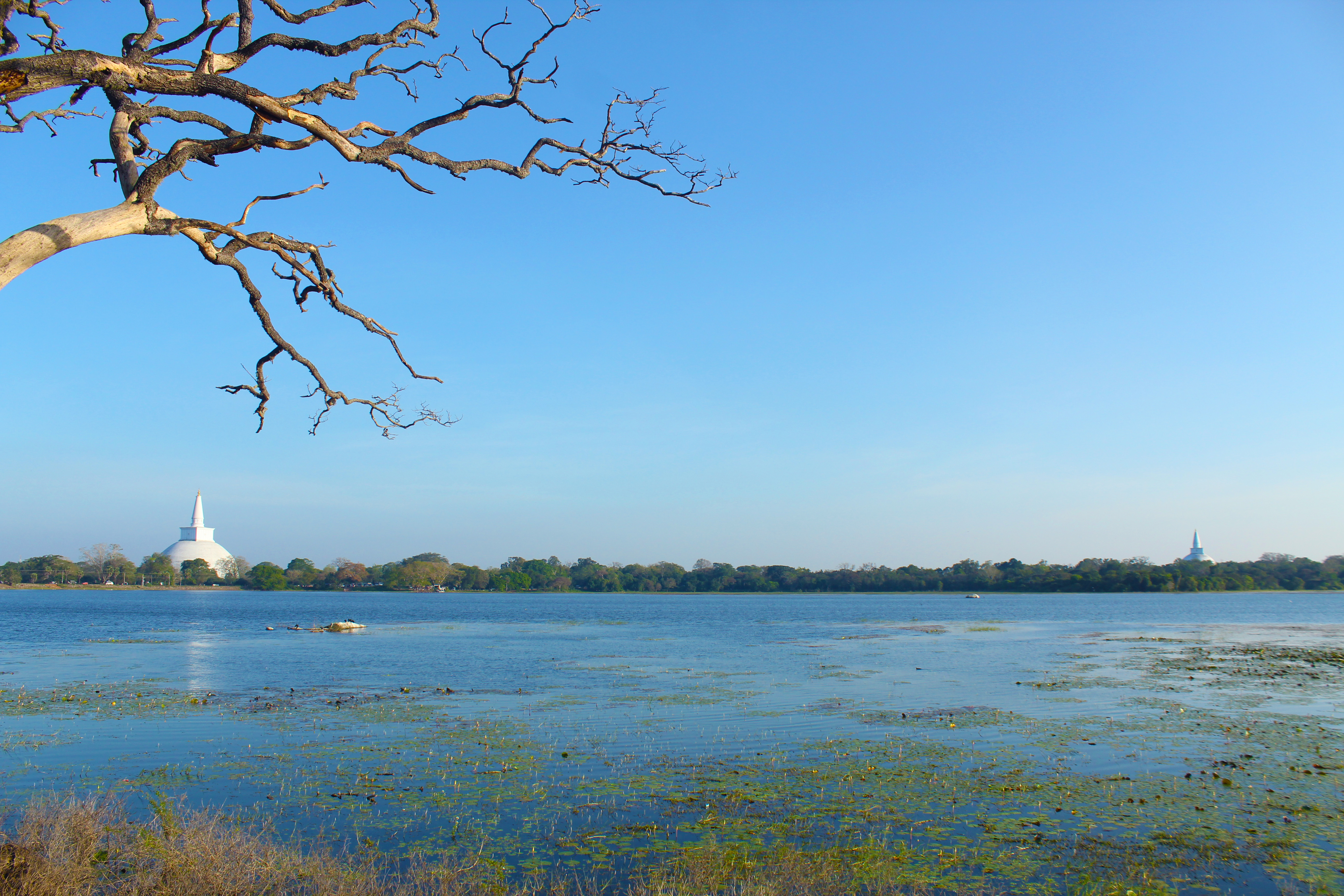
From the Basawakkulama dam

Abhaya Wewa (Sinhalese: අභය වැව), historically Abhayavapi (Sinhalese: අභයවාපි) or Bassawakkulama reservoir, is a reservoir in Sri Lanka, built by King Pandukabhaya who ruled in Anuradhapura from 437 BC to 367 BC, after constructing the city.

It was constructed in 380 BC. The dam of the reservoir is 10 m high. The water of the reservoir is also accumulated in the Giritale and Kantalai. Currently, the reservoir is about 255 acres. The embankment of the reservoir is about 5910 feet long and 22 feet high above the sill level of the sluice.

== Size ==
Area is 1,235 acres (500 ha; 1.930 sq mi); the length of the Waw Kandiya (Sinhalese: වැව් කන්ඩිය English: embankment) is 5,910 feet (1.119 mi) and height is 22 feet (6.7 m). The width of the top of the embankment is 6 feet (1.8 m) to 8 feet (2.4 m).

== Purpose ==
Built inside the ancient Anuradhapura, it supplied water to the city population.

== History ==
King Paduwasdeva of Sri Lanka, when married Subaddhakacanna from North India, and her seven brothers also came to Sri Lanka and established their villages. One of the brothers, Anuradha established Anuradhapura where he constructed the first reservoir. The reservoir was expanded by king Pandukabhaya. The reservoir was called Abaya Vapi at that time, in memory of one of King's uncles. The reservoir was used to feed the irrigation system.

== See also ==
- Anuradhapura Kingdom § Irrigation and water management
- Irrigation works in ancient Sri Lanka
- Basawakkulama inscription
