= Atamasthana =

Eight sacred places in Sri Lanka where the Buddha visited

Anuradhapura
UNESCO World Heritage Site
- Location: Anuradhapura District, Sri Lanka
- Criteria: Cultural: (ii), (iii), (vi)
- Reference: 200
- Inscription: 1982 (6th Session)

Atamasthana (Sinhala: අටමස්ථාන) or Eight sacred places are a series of locations in Sri Lanka the Buddha visited during the three trips that many Buddhists believe he made to the country. The sacred places are known as Jaya Sri Maha Bodhiya, Ruwanwelisaya, Thuparamaya, Lovamahapaya, Abhayagiri Dagaba, Jetavanarama, Mirisaveti Stupa and Lankarama. They are situated in Anuradhapura, the capital of the ancient Anuradhapura Kingdom.

Anuradhapura, regarded a sacred city, exerted considerable influence on the development of architecture in the country for several centuries. The city was nominated as a UNESCO World Heritage Site in 1982, it lies 205 km north of the current capital Colombo in the island's North Central Province, on the banks of the historic Malvathu Oya.

According to the Mahavamsa, the city was founded around 350 BC by Pandukabhaya, the first king of the Anuradhapura kingdom and sixth since the legendary arrival of Vijaya. It eventually became the principal shrine of Buddhism including the location of a sacred fig tree, planted from a branch of the Bodhi tree from Bodhgaya, under which the Buddha is believed to have achieved enlightenment. The tree was brought there in the 3rd century BC during the second mission, led by Sangamitta, a Buddhist nun and daughter of Emperor Ashoka according to Sri Lankan tradition. The relics of Buddha have, moreover, shaped the religious topography of Anuradhapura, where the Thuparamaya was built by Devanampiya Tissa in the 3rd century BC to house the clavicle of Buddha, an important religious relic presented by Ashoka.

The city's apogee was reached under the reign of Dutugamanu, who, in 161 BC, defeated the South Indian invader Ellalan, re-establishing Buddhism on the island. He built several monuments in the city including the Mirisaveti Stupa, Ruwanwelisaya, and the Brazen Palace. The city flourished for 1,300 years, and then was abandoned after an invasion in 993. Later hidden away in dense jungle for many years, the site, with its palaces, monasteries, and monuments, is now accessible once again.

== List of Atamasthana ==
=== Jaya Sri Maha Bodhi ===
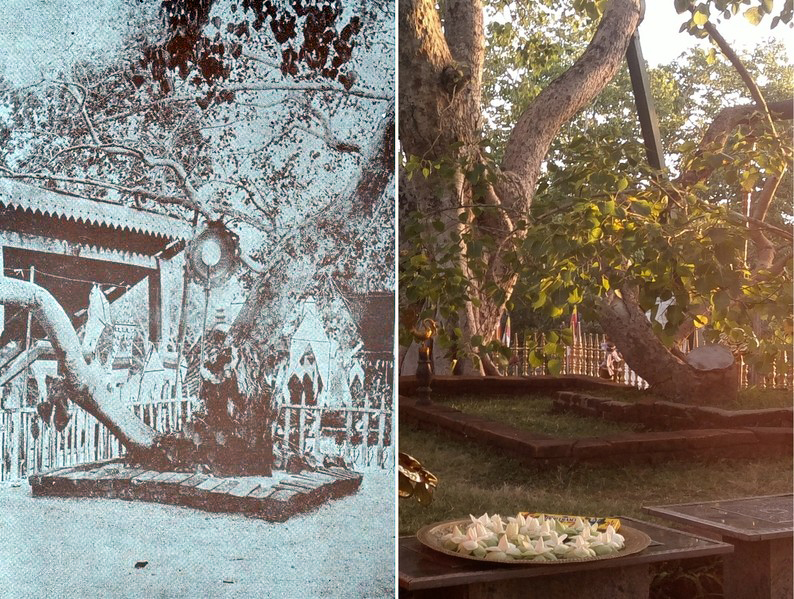
Jaya Sri Maha Bodhi, Anuradhapura, Sri Lanka. The oldest living tree in the documented history of the world.

Jaya Sri Maha Bodhi is a Sacred Fig tree in Anuradhapura, Sri Lanka. It is said to be a sapling from the historical Bodhi tree under which Buddha became enlightened. It was planted in 288 BC and is said to be the southern branch of the Sri Maha Bodhi Bodhgaya India, also the oldest living human-planted tree in the world with a known planting date. The sacred tree brought by the Ven. Sangamitta, the sister of Ven. Arahath Mahinda who introduced Buddha's teachings to Sri Lanka.

The area around the Sri Maha Bodhi, the Brazen Palace and Ruvanvelisaya dageba was once probably part of the Maha Vihara (Great Temple). The sacred bodhi tree is the oldest historically authenticated tree in the world, for it has been tended by an uninterrupted succession of guardians for over 2000 years, even during the periods of Indian occupation.

The Uda Maluwa, 35 feet by 55 feet, is 35 feet above the ground. The wall was constructed during the reign of King Kirthi Sri Rajasingha, to protect it from wild elephants. The late Ven. Pallegama Rewatha Thera had planted the Pariwara Bo trees (accompanying Bo trees) to camouflage the Bodhi to pd to safeguard it from natural disasters such as strong winds and rains.

All Sri Lankan Heads of State usually have sought the blessings of the Sri Maha Bodhi before commencing any important work.

=== Ruwanwelisaya ===
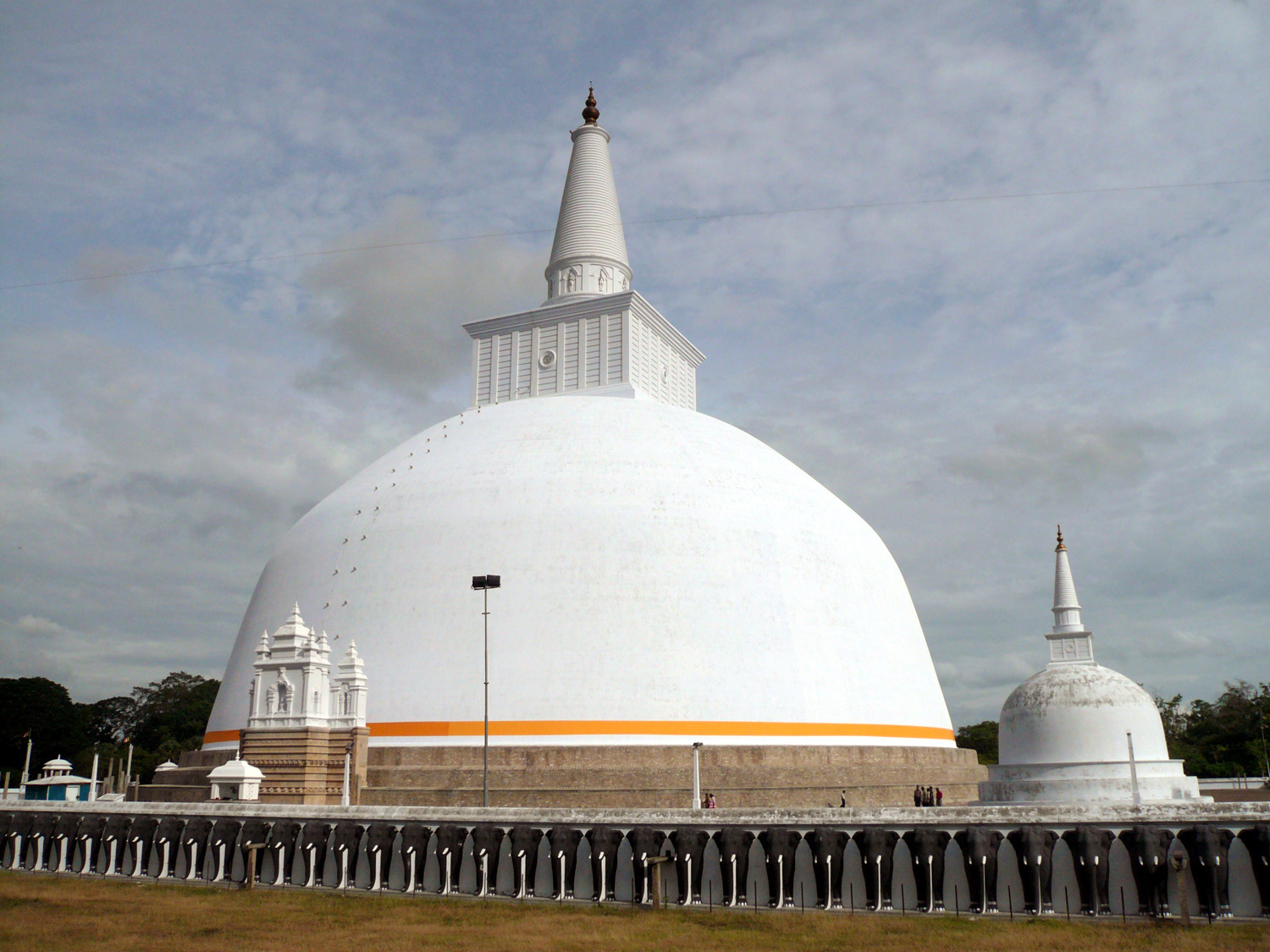
Ruwanwelisaya Chedi in the sacred city of Anuradhapura, Sri Lanka.

The Ruwanwelisaya is a stupa in Sri Lanka, considered a marvel for its architectural qualities and sacred to many Buddhists all over the world. It was built by King Dutugemunu, who became lord of all Sri Lanka after a war in which the Chola King Elara, was defeated. It is also known as Mahathupa, Swarnamali Chaitya, Suvarnamali Mahaceti (in Pali) and Rathnamali Dagaba. Also, King Dutugemunu didn't live to see the completion of dageba but his final sight as he lay on his deathbed could be a false bamboo-and-cloth finish placed around the dageba to show his ‘completed’ masterpiece.

Today, after incurring much damage from invading Indian forces, it rises 55m, considerably less than its original height; nor is its form the same as the earlier ‘bubble’ shape. A limestone statue south of the great dageba is popularly thought to be of King Dutugemunu.

=== Thuparamaya ===
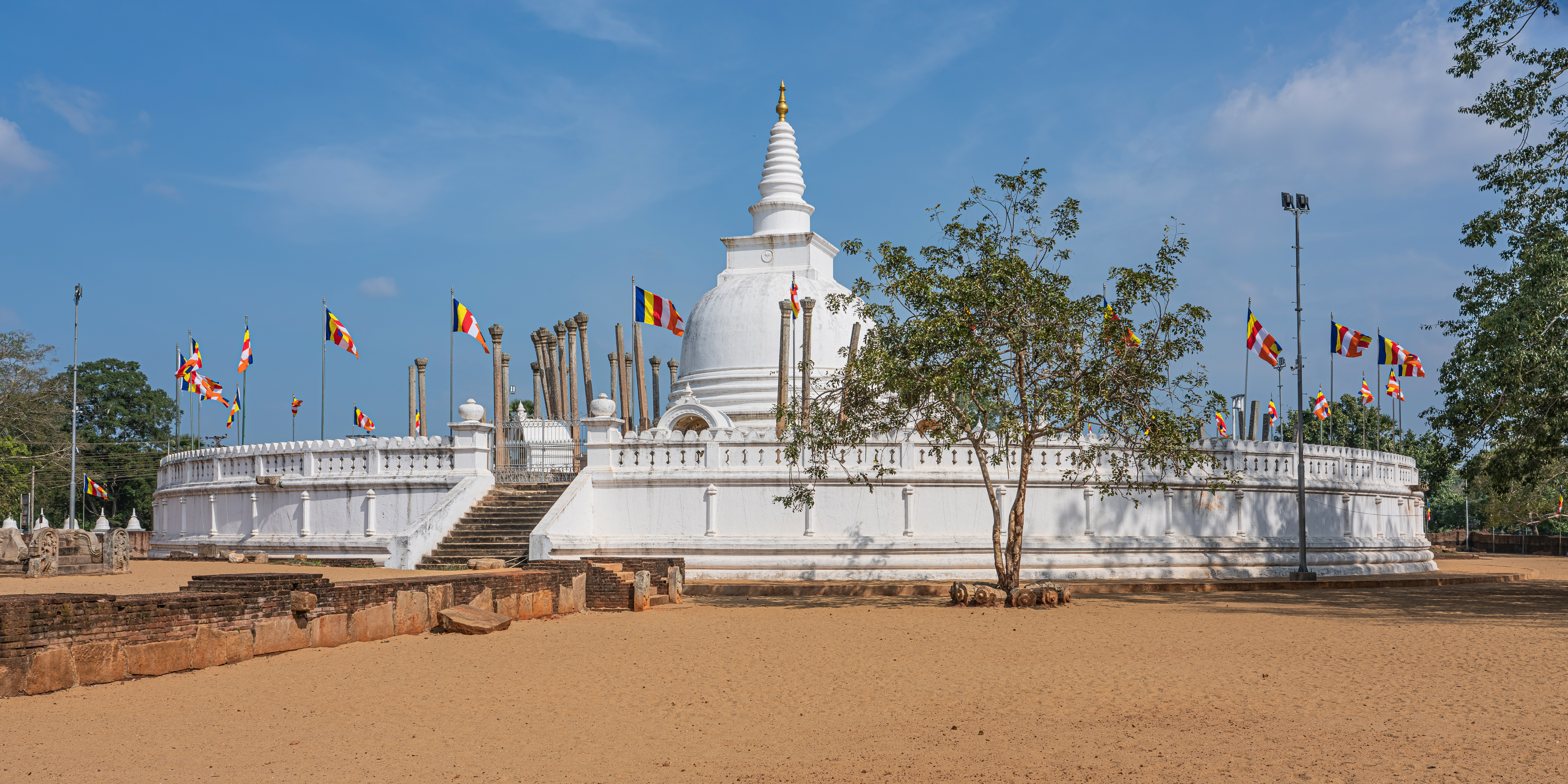
Thuparamaya dageba in Anuradhapura.

Thuparamaya is a dageba in Anuradhapura, Sri Lanka. It is a Buddhist sacred place of veneration. Thera Mahinda, an envoy sent by King Ashoka himself introduced Theravada Buddhism and also chetiya worship to Sri Lanka. At his request, King Devanampiyatissa built Thuparamaya in which the collarbone of the Buddha was enshrined. It is considered to be the first dagaba built in Sri Lanka following the introduction of Buddhism. This is considered the earliest monument, the construction of which was chronicled in Sri Lanka. The name Thuparamaya comes from "stupa" and "aramaya" which is a residential complex for monks.

Thuparama dageba is the oldest dageba in Sri Lanka – indeed, probably the oldest visible dageba in the world. It was constructed by Devanampiya Tissa in the 3rd century BC and is said to contain the right collarbone of the Buddha. Its ‘heap-of-paddy-rice’ shape was restored in 1862 in a more conventional bell shape and to a height of 19m.

The surrounding vatadage's slender, capital-topped pillars, perhaps the dageba's most unusual feature, enclose the structure in four concentric circles. Impressions on the dageba pediments indicate the pillars originally numbered 176, of which 41 still stand. Although some Sri Lankan scholars believe these once supported a conical wooden roof, there is no archaeological evidence for this theory, nor does it follow any known antecedent in South India, whose dagebas were the prototypes for virtually all Sinhalese dagebas.

=== Lovamahapaya ===
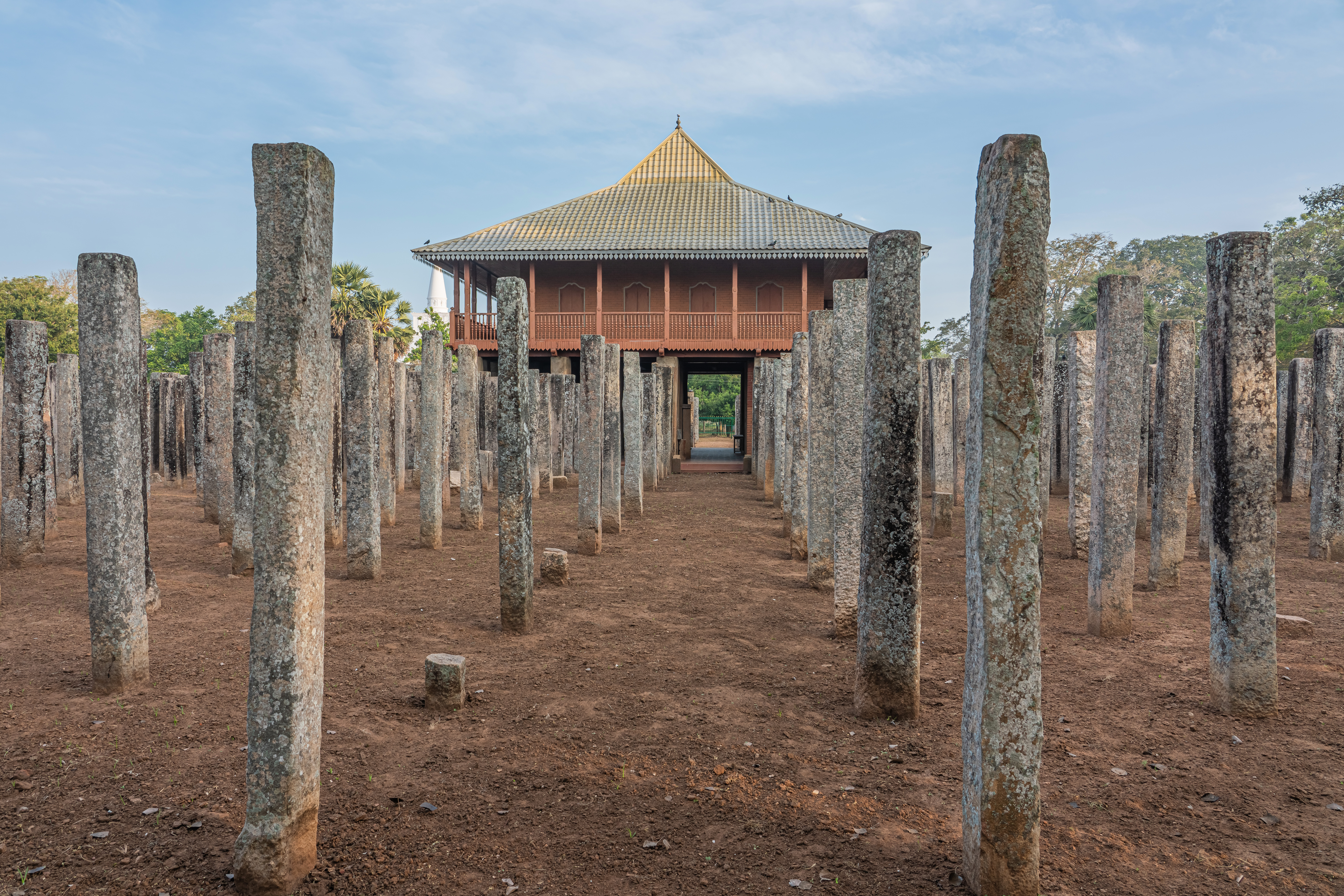
Lovamahapaya

Lovamahapaya is a building situated between Ruvanveliseya and Sri Mahabodiya in the ancient city of Anuradhapura, Sri Lanka. It is also known as the Brazen Palace or Lohaprasadaya because the roof was covered with bronze tiles.

It was originally built by King Dutugemunu more than 2,000 years ago, but throughout the ages, it was rebuilt many times, each time a little less grandiosely. There are remains of 1600 columns all that is left of this huge palace, Archaeological evidence said to have had nine storeys and could accommodate around 1000 monks and attendants.

The current stand of pillars (now fenced off) is all that remains from the last rebuild – that of King Parakramabahu around the 12th century.

=== Abhayagiri Dagaba ===
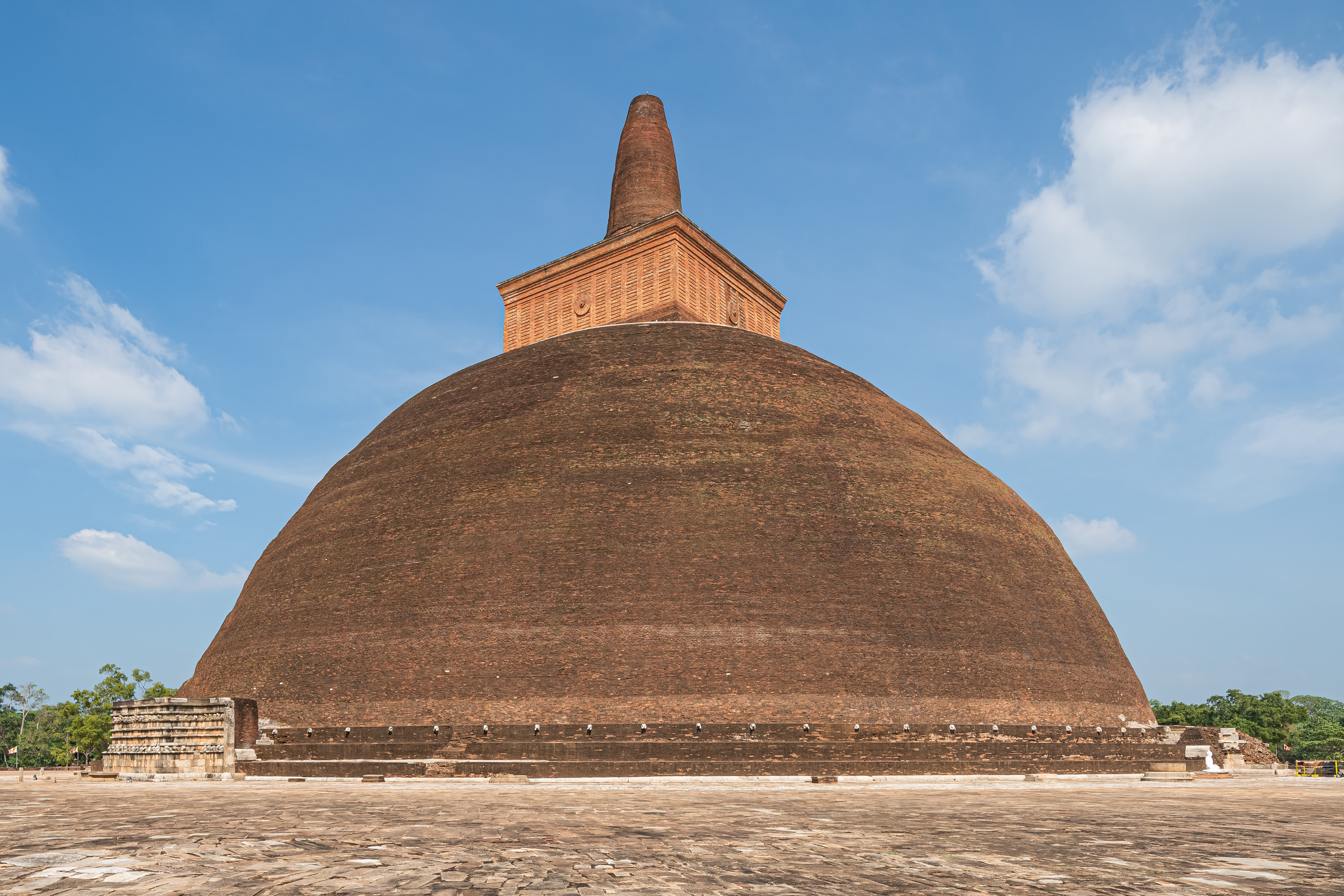
The Abayagiri dageba in Anuradhapura.

The Abhayagiri Dagaba is situated in Anuradhapura, Sri Lanka. It was built during the reign of King Wattagamini Abhaya (commonly known as King Valagamba). It is one of the most extensive ruins in the world and one of the most sacred Buddhist pilgrimage cities. Historically it was a great monastic centre as well as a royal capital, with magnificent monasteries rising to many stories, roofed with gilt bronze or tiles of burnt clay glazed in brilliant colours. To the north of the city, encircled by great walls and containing elaborate bathing ponds, carved balustrades and moonstones, stood "Abhayagiri", one of seventeen such religious units in Anuradhapura and the largest of its five major viharas. Surrounding the humped dagaba, Abhayagiri Vihara was a seat of the Northern Monastery or Uttara Vihara.

The 1st or 2nd century BC Abhayagiri dageba (confused by some books and maps with the Jetavanarama), was the centrepiece of a monastery of 5000 monks. The name means ‘Hill of Protection’ or ‘Fearless Hill’, another claim ‘Giri’ was the name of a local Jain monk. The monastery was part of the ‘School of the Secret Forest’, a heretical sect that studied both Mahayana and Theravada Buddhism, also Chinese traveller Faxian (also spelt Fa Hsien) visited in AD 412.

The dageba was probably rebuilt several times to reach its peak 75m height. It has some interesting bas-reliefs, including one near the western stairway of an elephant pulling up a tree. A large slab with a Buddha footprint can be seen on the northern side, and the eastern and western steps have unusual moonstones made from concentric stone slabs.

=== Jetavanaramaya ===
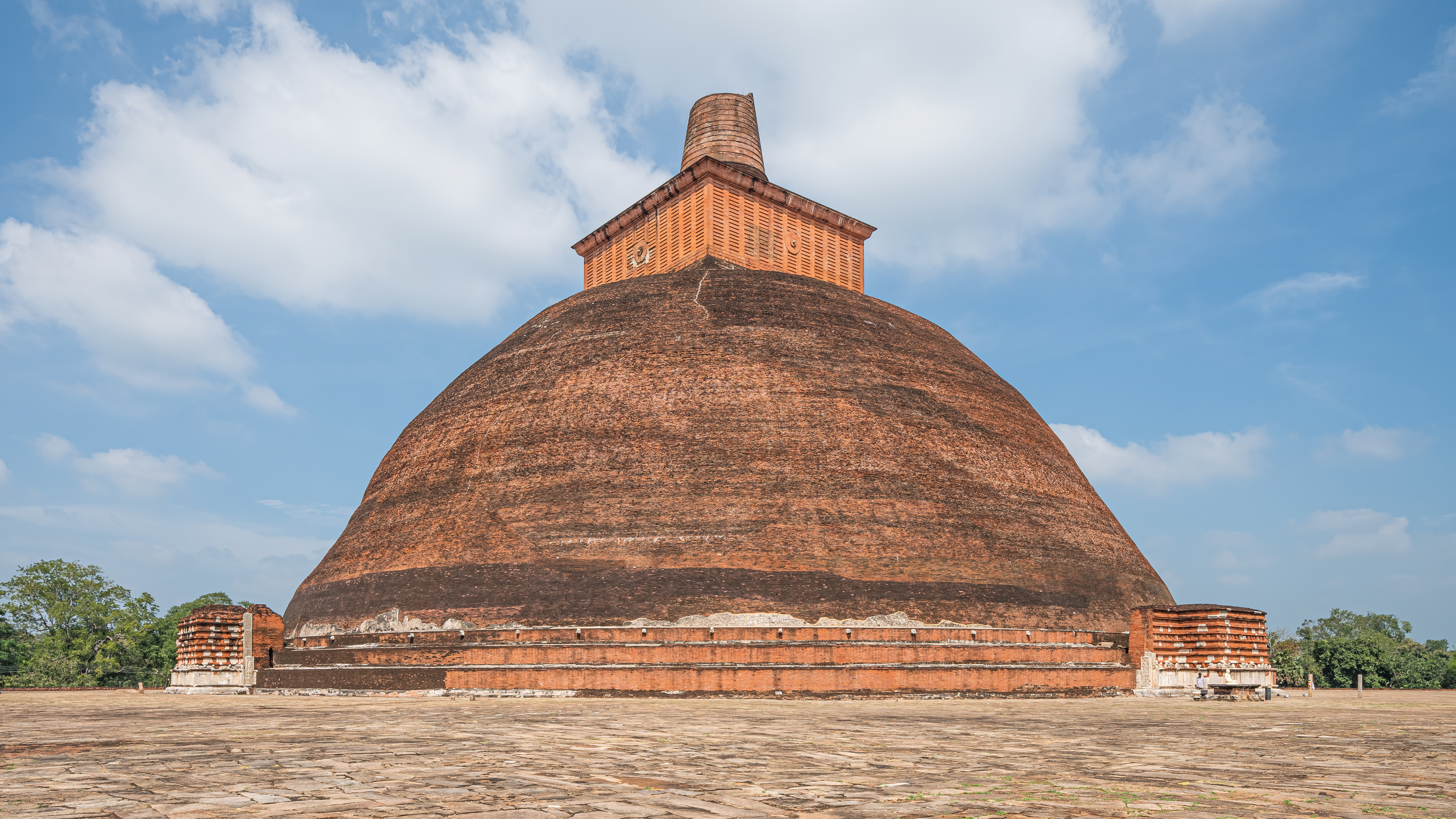
The Jetavanarama dageba in Anuradhapura.

The Jetavanaramaya is a stupa, located in the ruins of Jetavana Monastery in the sacred world heritage city of Anuradhapura, Sri Lanka. King Mahasena (273-301 AD) initiated the construction of the stupa following the destruction of Mahavihara, and his son Meghavanna resumed the construction work of the stupa. A part of a sash or belt tied by the Buddha is believed to be the relic that is enshrined here.

The archaeologists believe it may have an original height of over 100m, but today is about 70m, and this was a similar height to the Abhayagiri as well. When it was built, it was the third-tallest monument in the world, the first two being Egyptian pyramids. A British guidebook from the early 20th century calculated that there were enough bricks in the dageba's brick core to make a 3m-high wall stretching from London to Edinburgh.

Behind it stand the ruins of a monastery that could accommodate around 3000 monks, and one building has doorjambs over 8 m high which is still standing, with another 3 m underground. At one time, massive doors opened to reveal a large Buddha image.

=== Mirisaveti Stupa ===
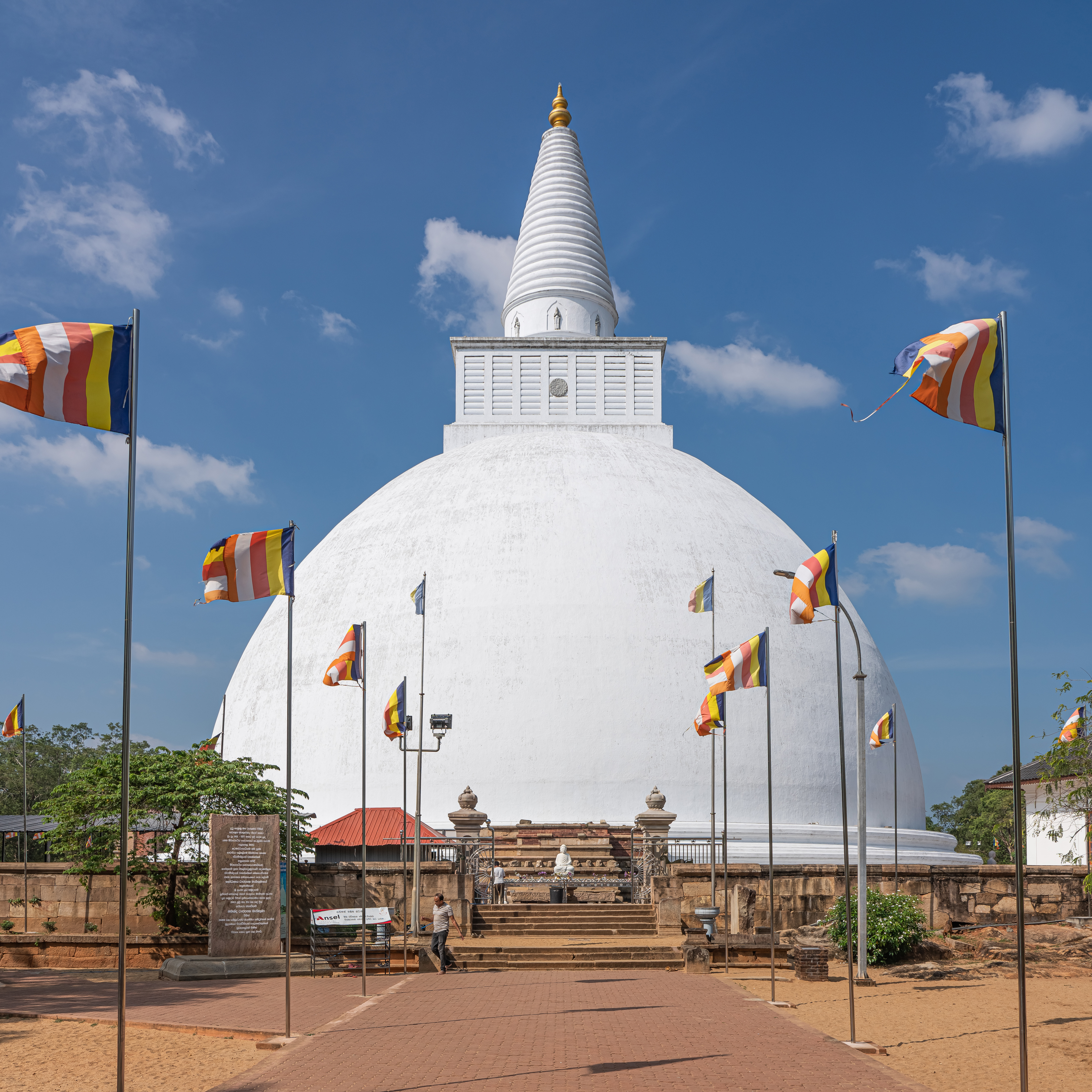
Mirisawetiya Stupa

The Mirisaveti Stupa is situated in the ancient city of Anuradhapura, Sri Lanka. King Dutugamunu built the Mirisaveti Stupa after defeating King Elara. After placing the Buddha relics in the sceptre, he had gone to Tisawewa for a bath leaving the sceptre. After the bath, he returned to the place where the sceptre was placed, and it was said that it could not be moved. The stupa was built in the place where the sceptre stood. It is also said that he remembered that he partook in a chilly curry without offering it to the sangha. In order to punish himself he built the Mirisavetiya Dagaba. The extent of this land is about 50 acres (20 hectares). Although the king Kasyapa I and Kasyapa V renovated this, from time to time it was dilapidated. What stands today is the renovation done by the Cultural Triangle Fund.

=== Lankarama ===
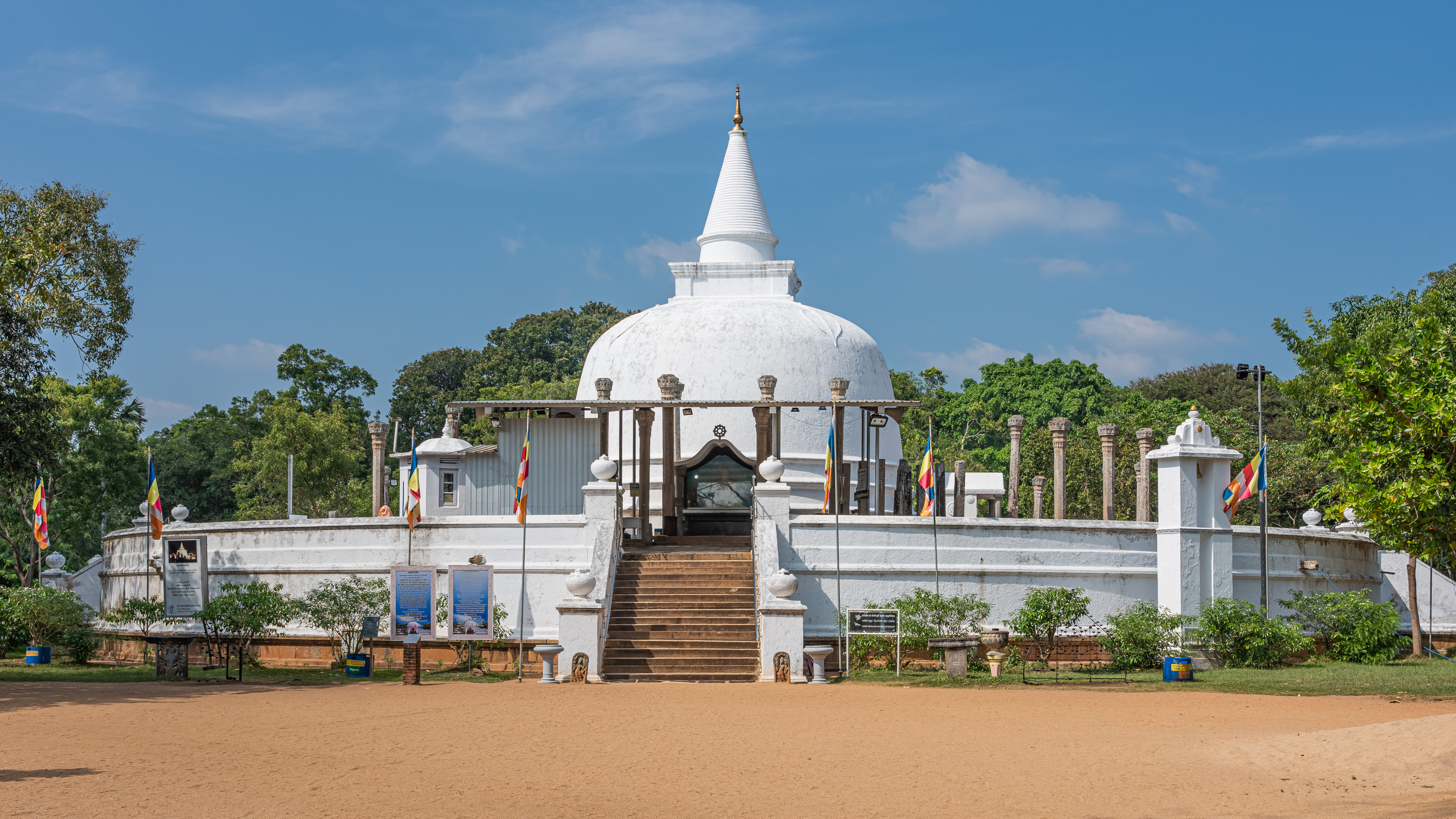
The Lankarama dageba.

Lankarama is a stupa built by King Valagamba, in an ancient place at Galhebakada in the ancient kingdom of Anuradhapura, Sri Lanka. Nothing is known about the ancient form of the stupa, and later this was renovated. The ruins show that there are rows of stone pillars and it is no doubt that there has been a house built encircling the stupa (Vatadage) to cover it. The round courtyard of the stupa seems to be 10 feet (3.0 m) above the ground. The diameter of the stupa is 45 feet (14 m). The courtyard is circular in shape and the diameter is 1,332 feet (406 m).

== Administration ==
The Atamasthana is under the administration of the Atamasthana Committee appointed under the Buddhist Temporalities Ordinance of 1931. As the committee will be the trustee of the Atamasthana and consist of three persons. One committee member nominated by:

1. the Nayaka Thera of the Bo-maluwa,
2. the head of the Nuwarawewa family,
3. the Mahanayake Theras of Malwathu Maha Viharaya and Asgiri Maha Viharaya and the Nayaka Thera of Sripadasthana.

The Atamasthana Committee appoints the Atamasthana Adhipathi, the Chief Priest of the Atamasthana.

== See also ==
- Cetiya
- Solosmasthana
