= Mirisawetiya Vihara =

Buddhist Stupa in Sri Lanka

Coordinates: 8°20′42″N 80°23′20″E

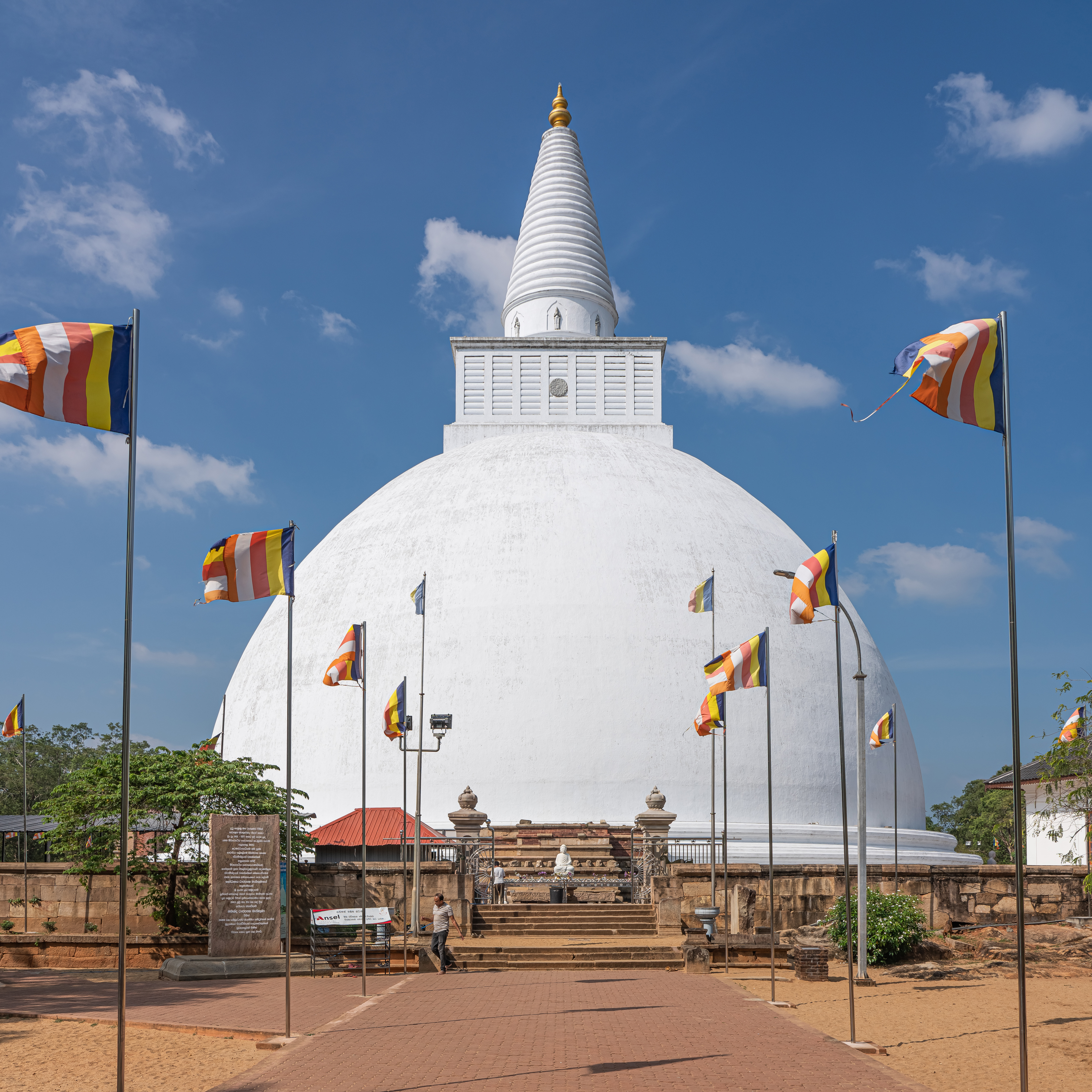
Mirisawetiya Stupa

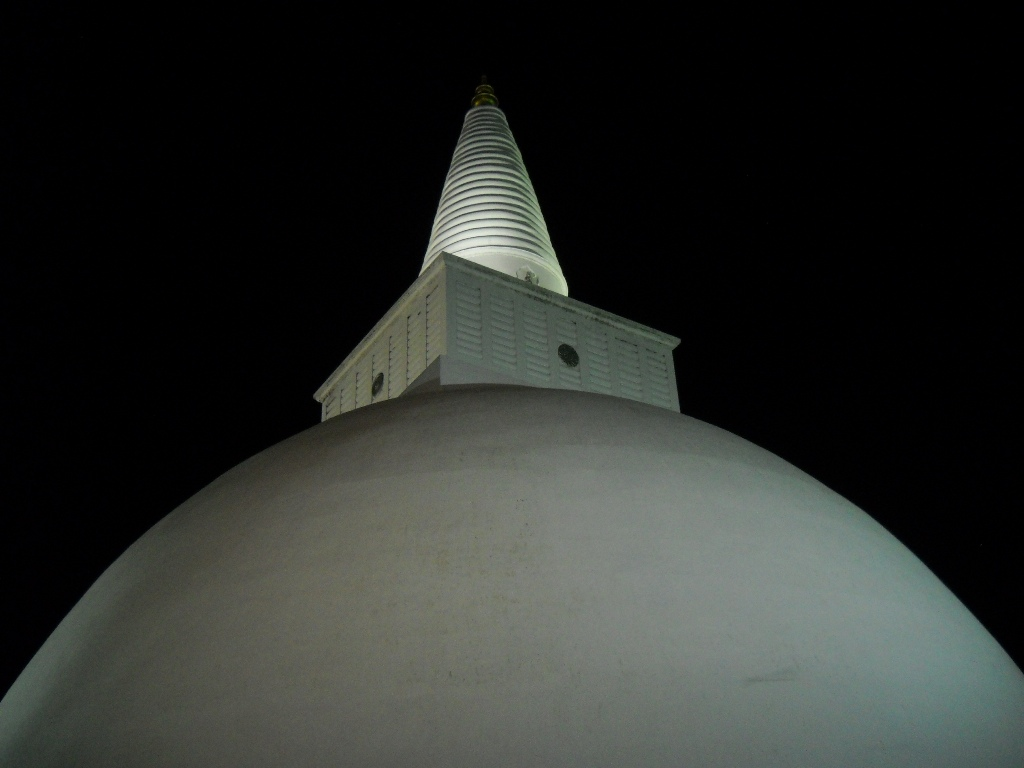
Mirisawetiya Stupa at night

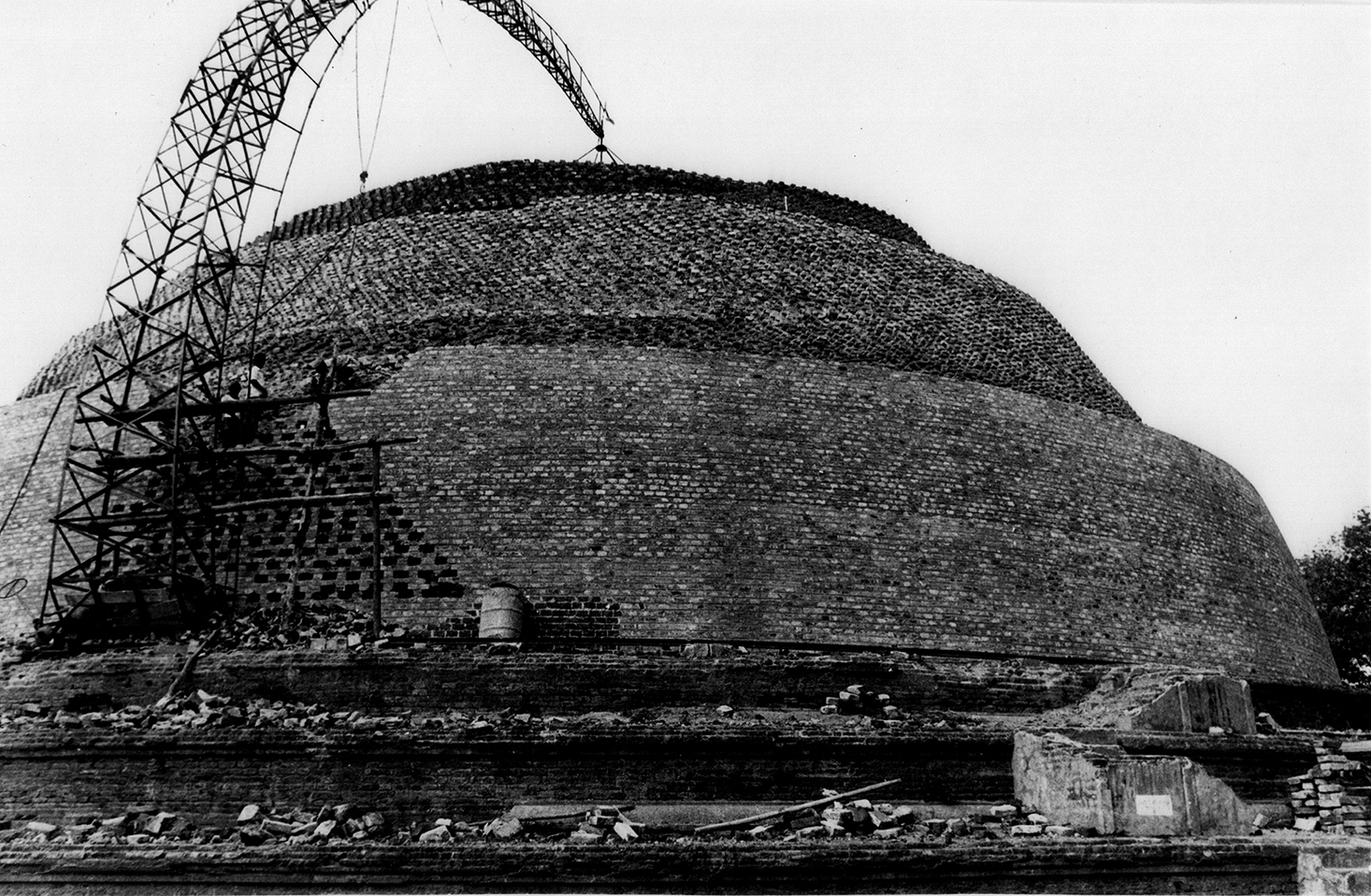
The Mirisavetiya Dāgäba at Anurādhapura during reconstruction works in May 1985. The third attempt at renovation was under the supervision of Roland Silva (1933–2020), Archaeological Commissioner. (Photo: Cyril Basnayake).

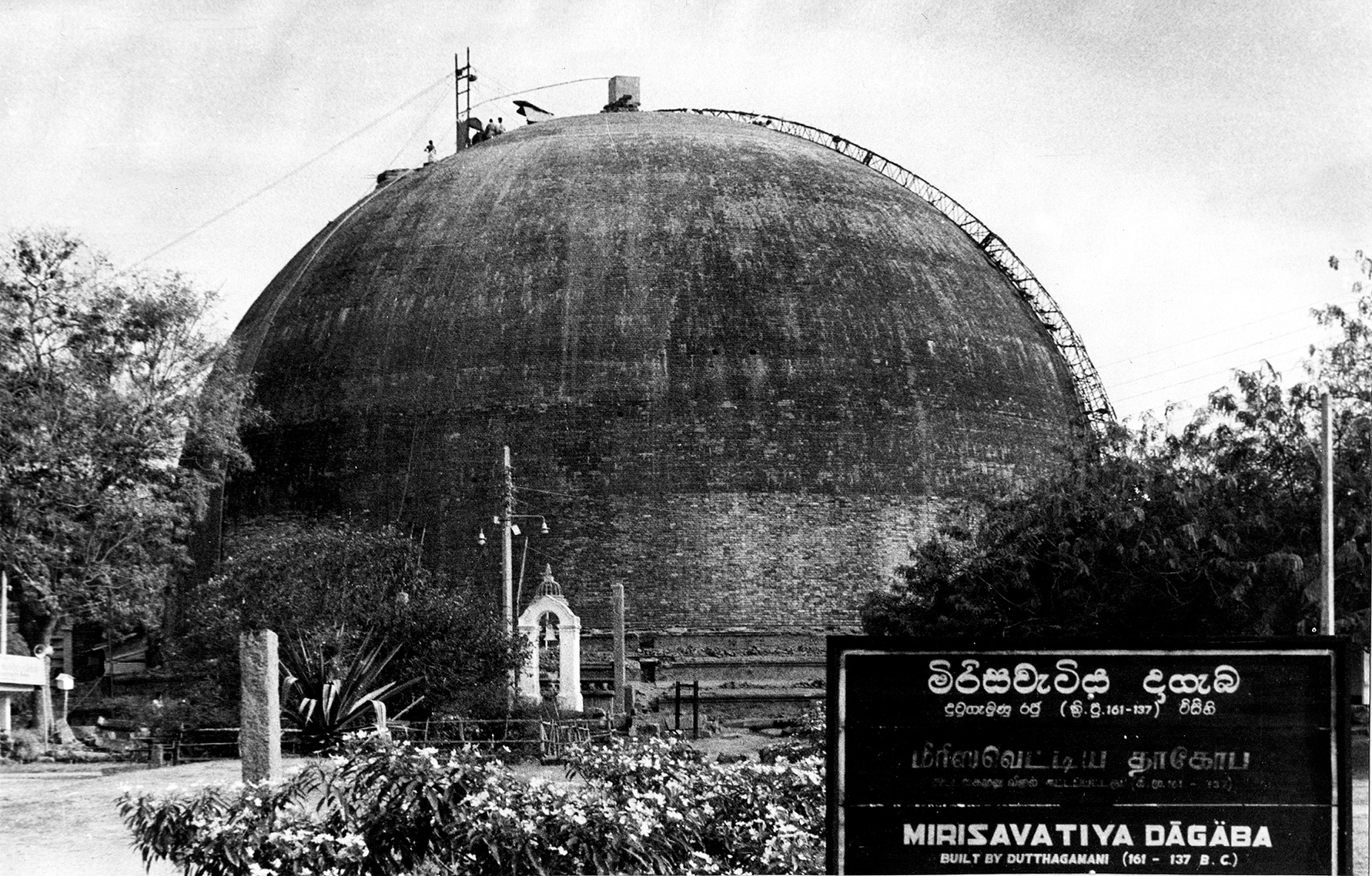
The third attempt of renovation of the Mirisavetiya Dāgäba at Anurādhapura in early June 1987. (Photo: Cyril Basnayake).

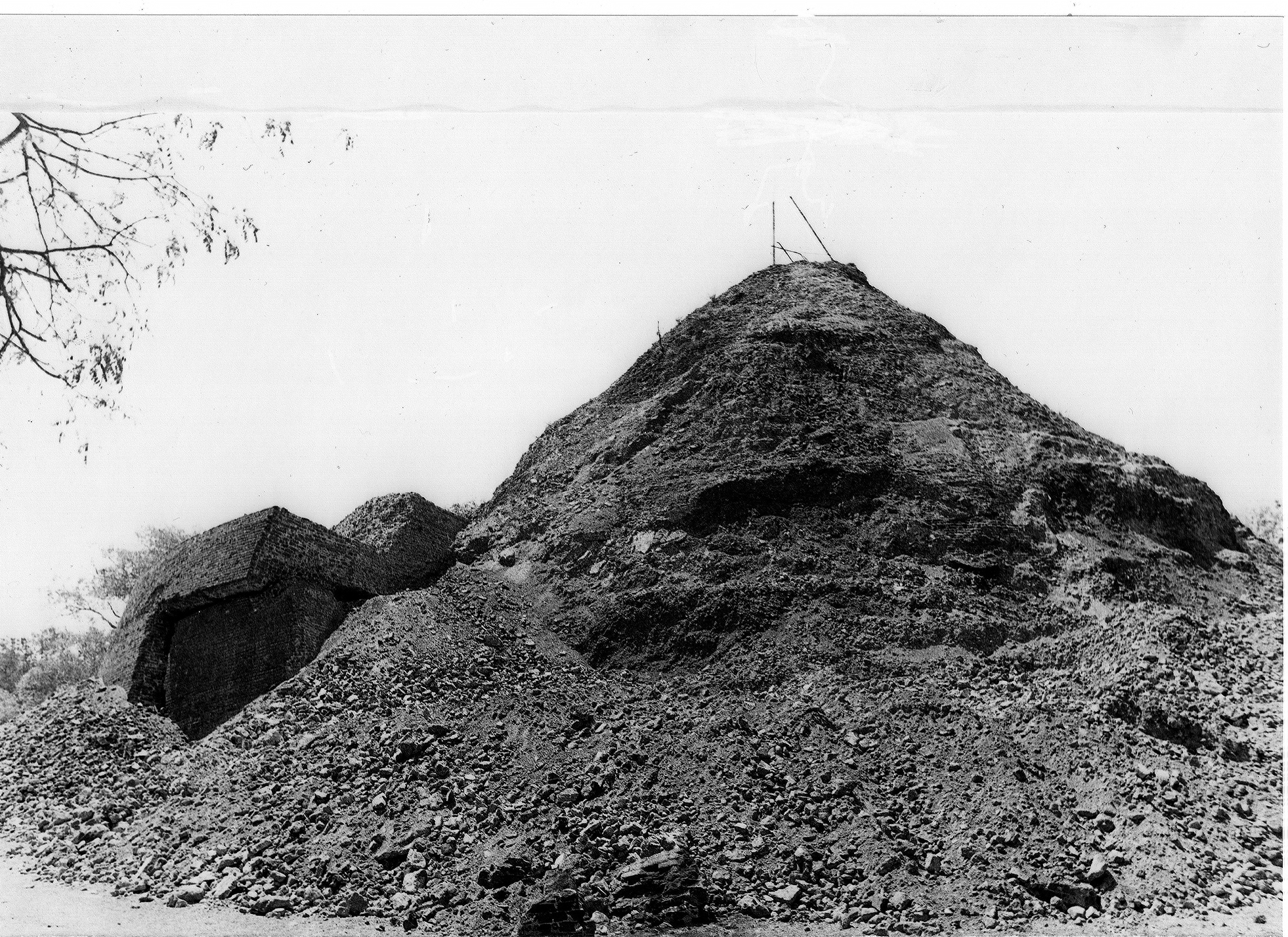
Demolishing of the Mirisavetiya Dāgäba at Anurādhapura in 1990, three years after the ill-fated third attempt of restoration. Only the weak inner core of the original Stūpa would eventually survive. (Photo: Cyril Basnayake).

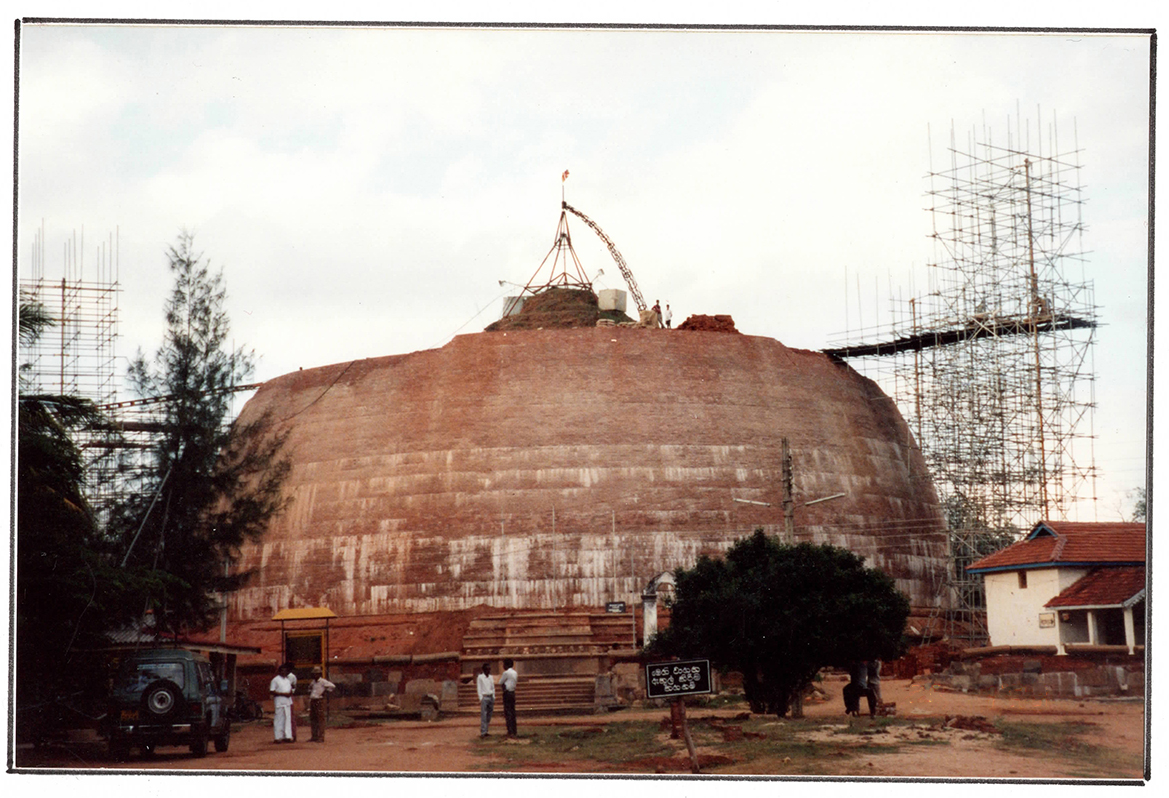
The second attempt by the Archaeological Department to restore the Mirisavetiya Dāgäba in January 1992. Layers of cement were added to prevent another collapse. (Photo: Ulrich von Schroeder, 1992).

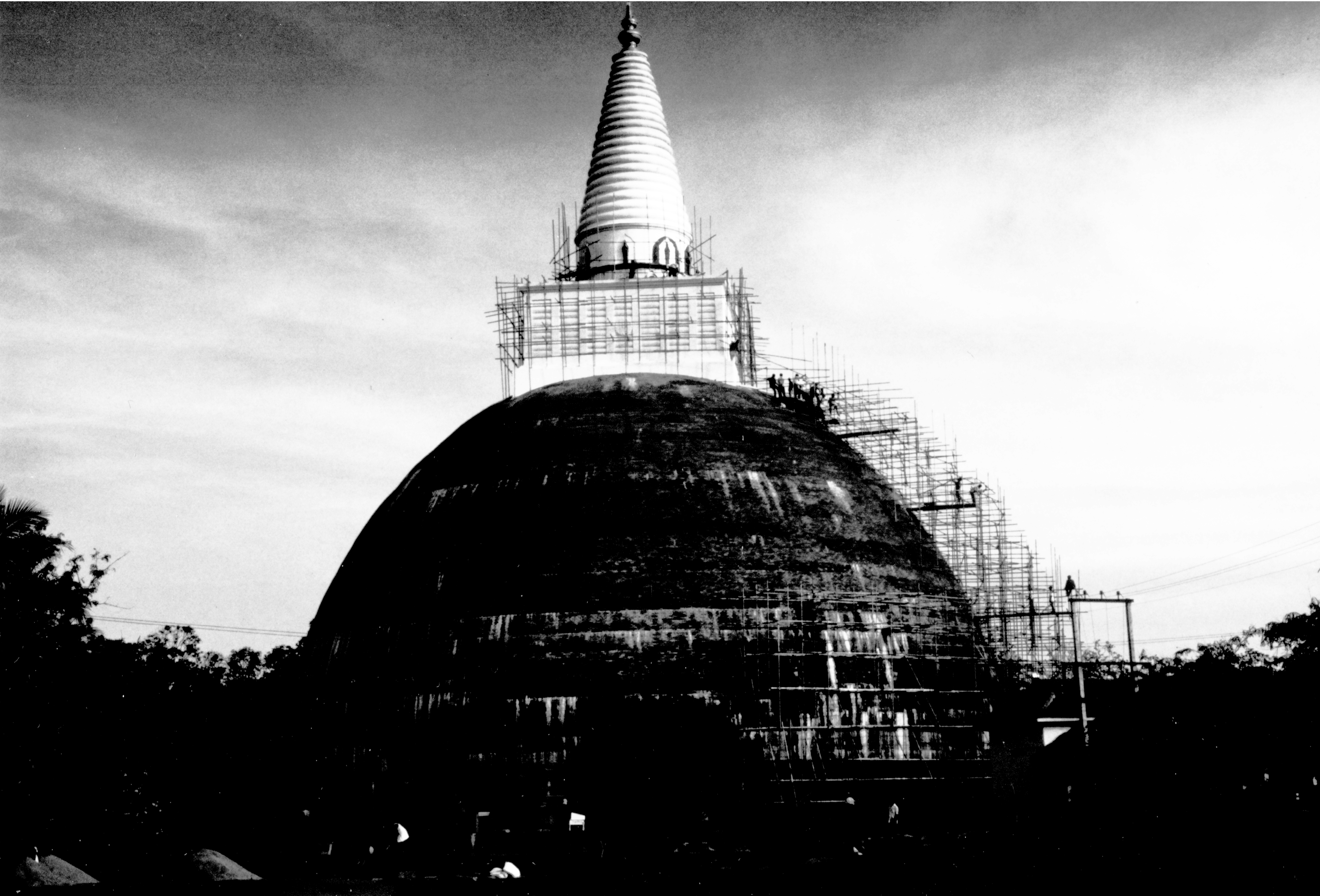
The present monument completed by the Archaeological Department in the 1993 that encloses the remnants of the original dāgäba has lost all ancient characteristics of the original edifice. (Photo: Ulrich von Schroeder, 1993).

The Mirisaweti Stupa (Sinhala: මිරිසවැටිය, Mirisavæṭiya) is a memorial building, a stupa, situated in the ancient city of Anuradhapura, Sri Lanka. King Dutugamunu (161 BC to 137 BC) built the Mirisaveti Stupa after defeating King Elara. After placing the Buddha's relics in the sceptre, he had gone to Tissa Wewa for a bath leaving the sceptre. After the bath, he returned to the place where the sceptre was placed, and it is said that it could not be moved. The stupa was built in the place where the sceptre stood. It is also said that he remembered that he partook in a chilly curry without offering it to the Sangha. In order to punish himself he built the Mirisavetiya Dagaba. The extent of this land is about 50 acres (20 ha). Although the kings Kasyapa I and Kasyapa V renovated this, from time to time it was dilapidated.

== Early restorations of the Mirisavetiya Dāgäba ==
More than two thousand years ago – during the second and first centuries BC – the first monumental stūpas, locally known as dāgäbas, were built in Sri Lanka. Such dome-shaped monuments were containing relics of the historical Buddha or of Buddhist saints. And like all man-made structures, these dāgäbas built of brick needed to be conserved and restored at regular intervals. In times of neglect the large dāgäbas started to crumble and were overgrown by tropical vegetation. The roots of trees would penetrate the layers of brick and cause cracks thus further increasing damage. According to the Mahāvaṃsa, the Mirisavetiya (Maricavaṭṭī) Dāgäba was built on the spot where the kunta (royal standard) of Duṭṭhagāmaṇī (c. BC 161–137) had been stuck in the earth and could not be removed. (Mhv. 26.11–19). Duṭṭhagāmaṇī built a large dāgäba despite the warnings recorded in the Mahāvaṃsa: "If our king shall begin to build so great a stupa, death will come upon him ere the stupa be finished; moreover, so great a stupa will be hard to repair". (Mhv. 29.52–53). The oldest reference to restoration works about two hundred fifty years after the initial construction of the Mirisavetiya refers to Gajabāhu I (c. 114–136 AD) who is credited with the making of a mantling for the dāgäba. About one hundred years later the chattrāvalī was restored by Vohārikatissa (c. 209–231 AD). Kassapa V (914–923 AD) restored the dāgäba and the vihāra. During the 11th century the Mirisavetiya and all other stūpas and monasteries were ransacked by Cholas from South India. Among numerous other renovation projects, Parākramabāhu I (1153–1186 AD) enlarged the Mirisavetiya Dāgäba to a height of about 36.5 metres. Restorations were resumed again by Niśśaṅkamalla (1187–1196 AD). For the next seven hundred years, the dāgäbas and Buddhist monasteries of Anurādhapura lay mostly in ruins. It seems reasonable to assume that by the beginning of the 19th century, almost all formerly intact ancient dāgäbas and temples had fallen into a state of partial or total disrepair due to a variety of factors, such as lack of maintenance and defective building materials. The Mirisavetiya Dāgäba shared the same fate of being totally overgrown.

== Later restorations of the Mirisavetiya Dāgäba ==
As already mentioned above, dāgäbas need to be restored at regular intervals. Henry Parker visited Anurādhapura for the first time in 1873 and recorded that the Mirisavetiya was little more than a conical mound covered with large trees and bushes, all the upper part having slipped down in a talus around its base. Anurādhapura's first government agent J.F. Dixon, with the help of James G. Smither, first cleared the area surrounding the dāgäba. Excavations of the Mirisavetiya were resumed in 1883 and the ruins of two image houses on the northern and southern sides of the dāgäba were discovered. In 1888 the first attempt of renovation began using prison labour under the direction of the public works department utilising a grant from the King of Siam, but the work could not be completed. According to H.C.P. Bell, the Archaeological Commissioner, by 1890 the ground around the Mirisavetiya had been cleared for a considerable time, and all ruins that existed above the surface were known. Bell added that a description of the Mirisavetiya entourage would not be possible at present. Sixteen years later, by 1906, the second attempt of restoration of the Mirisavetiya Dāgäba was much advanced and the paved platform on which the dāgäba stands had been unearthed. The Archaeological Department tried to repair the Stūpa by mantling the remaining mound with bricks, but this work was abandoned by them later when the height of the new dome stood at 60 feet. All four Vahālkaḍas, also known as frontispieces, described H. C. P. Bell as Mandapaya and formerly partly hidden under tons of debris, were freed by 1906. The North Mandapaya, excavated in 1903, was described as being in a perfect condition. The East Mandapaya had little damage, the South Mandapaya was in a wonderful state of preservation, and the West Mandapaya was as perfect as the North Mandapaya. Today only one Vahālkaḍa survives more or less intact. According to A. M. Hocart, in 1928 all four cardinal points of the Mirisavetiya Dāgäba Vahālkaḍa structures were built of gneiss. It has been proposed that these represent later copies of the damaged dolomite marble originals. At present, after the fourth restoration, the last two times by the Archaeological Department of Sri Lanka under the supervision of Roland Silva, only the West Vahālkaḍa remains intact. However, it had to be restored after having been destroyed when the renovated dāgäba collapsed on 9 June 1987. Of the other three Vahālkaḍas that were in a perfect condition one hundred years ago, only damaged remains of one of the three others survive. During the 20th century, various renovation works of the Mirisavetiya Dāgäba were carried out, although some were without detailed written records. An anonymous photograph documents restoration works in the 1920s. It likely appears to document the second attempt by the Archaeological Department of Sri Lanka to encase the Mirisavetiya Dāgäba with bricks. From 1980 onward, a third attempt was undertaken to renovate the Mirisavetiya Dāgäba. It was done through the efforts of a Stūpa Development Society with the help of the Department of Archaeology under the supervision of Roland Silva (1933–2020), Archaeological Commissioner and Director-General, Cultural Triangle. The restoration attempt ended with the sudden collapse of the newly renovated Mirisavetiya Dāgäba on 24 June 1987, the day before the Poson Poya Day. The collapse, which also destroyed the only surviving Vahālkaḍa, occurred immediately as the chanting started in the all-night Pirith Ceremony, triggering theories of a "curse of the gods". Large segments of the new brickwork of the Stūpa separated and fell off due to the several vertical cracks that already earlier had been noticed on the dome. This happened in the presence of the assembly of monks presided over by Sirimalwatte Sri Ananda Thero (1973–1989). Among the distinguished guests present were President Ranasinghe Premadasa, ministers, ambassadors as well as the whole press corps and countless onlookers. The wide media exposure led to a public outcry and was a big embarrassment for the government as well as the Archaeological Department and the UNESCO Cultural Triangle project. This calamity prevented the planned pinnacle unveiling ceremony and enshrinement of relics on Poson Poya Day. Instead, the collapsed dāgäba had to be demolished. This was achieved by using pneumatic hammers and took almost three years to be accomplished. After the low-quality bricks of the third attempted restoration had been removed, only the weak inner core of the original Stūpa survived. In 1990, the reconstruction of a new dāgäba with bricks and layers of reinforced cement began at the spot where the Mirisavetiya Dāgäba used to be, again supervised by Roland Silva, the Archaeological Commissioner. The new dāgäba, that represented the fourth attempt at restoration, was ceremonially unveiled on 4 June 1993, the Poson full moon day. Although the archaeologists had wished not to plaster the newly built Stūpa, it was nevertheless done at the request of the Buddhist council. The covering of the newly built dāgäba with white plaster was finished in 1996. The present monument that encloses the remnants of the original dāgäba has lost all characteristics of the original edifice. The present Mirisavetiya Dāgäba is 192 feet (59 metres) in height and 141 feet (43 metres) in diameter.

Collapse of the Mirisavetiya Dāgäba On 24 June 1987 at Anurādhapura, Sri Lanka

== See also ==
- Ancient Constructions of Sri Lanka
- Atamasthana
- Buddhism in Sri Lanka
- List of tallest structures built before the 20th century
