= Archaeological Protected Monuments in Sri Lanka =

The archaeological heritage of Sri Lanka can be divided into three ages; Prehistoric (Stone-age), Protohistoric (Iron Age), and historical period. The presence of man activities in Sri Lanka probably dates from 75,000 years ago (late Pleistocene period). Prehistoric sites which are presently identified in the country are distributed from the maritime belt and the lowland plains of the wet and dry zones to the high plateaus and rain forests in the central and southwestern mountain regions of the island. The protohistoric period expands from about 1000 BC to the historical period at about 500 BC. The main indicators of the distribution of protohistoric and early settlements on the island are the megalithic burials and pottery sites.

The beginning of the historical period of Sri Lanka is traditionally assigned to the reign of King Devanampiya Tissa (307–267 BC) when the Buddhism was introduced to Sri Lanka by the missionaries sent by the Indian emperor Ashoka. However, the first clear information about the establishment of buildings and structures are dated back to the time of king Pandukabhaya (437–367 BC).

Sri Lanka's political and religious history is mainly set out by the ancient chronicles as well as over 4,000 stone inscriptions from the 3rd century BC onward. Which gives the history in considerable detail from the 3rd century and less reliably back to the 6th century BC.

Sri Lanka has more than 250,000 identified archaeological sites throughout the country and some of them have been declared as archaeological reserves and protected monuments by the Sri Lanka archaeological department. Archaeological reserves are sites that consist of archaeological remains which are under the direct control of the archaeological department. Protected monuments are privately owned but scheduled under section 18 of the Antiquities Ordinance No.09 of 1940.

== Declaration of monuments ==
According to sections 16, 17, 18, and 19 of the Antiquities Ordinance No.09 of 1940, the minister who is in charge of the subject may declare the ancient monuments by notification published in the government Gazette. Also under sections 16, 17, and 19, ancient buildings and trees on state or private lands, may be declared as ancient monuments to provide safety and protection for them.

Ancient construction with a historical and archaeological value which are over 100 years of age can also be declared as ancient monuments in terms of the provisions of the Antiquities (Amendment) Act No. 24 of 1988.

== Eastern Province ==
=== Batticaloa District ===
Monument	Image	Location	Grama Niladhari Division	Divisional Secretary's Division	Registered	Description	Refs
Batticaloa fort		Batticaloa Town		Batticaloa			
Pulukunawa Raja Maha Vihara		Eruwilporativu		Manmunai Pattu		The Drip-ledged caves, Dagobas, pillared structures, Asanagharas, ponds and a torso of a Buddha image	
Rahat Gala		Thandamale					

== North Central Province ==
=== Polonnaruwa District ===
Monument	Image	Location	Grama Niladhari Division	Divisional Secretary's Division	Registered	Description	Refs
Dimbulagala Raja Maha Vihara		Dimbulagala	211-Dimbulagala	Dimbulagala	24 May 1957		
Halmillawewa Ruins		Halmillawewa	32-Gal Oya	Hingurakgoda	23 February 2007	Ancient Dagaba and ruins of buildings situated in the forest area close to Halmillawewa	
Kaudagala Forest Monastery		Kurulubedda	282-Mahindagama	Welikanda	20 March 2017	Ruins of ancient stupas, ruins of buildings, caves with drips and paintings situated in the forest area close to Kaudagala	
Medirigiriya Vatadage		Medirigiriya	87-Medirigiriya	Medirigiriya			
Nagalakanda Mahasen Monastery		Minneriya					
Namal Pokuna Monastery		Dimbulagala		Dimbulagala			
Silumina Seya		Aralaganwila					
Unagalawehera Rajamaha Viharaya		Unagalawehera	52-Unagalavehera West	Hingurakgoda			
Somawathiya Chaitya		Meenvillu	137-Sungawila	Lankapura	7 July 1967	The Stupa	

== See also ==
- Ancient constructions of Sri Lanka
- Solosmasthana

== Notes ==
- "PART I : SECTION (I) — GENERAL Government Notifications" (PDF). The Gazette of the Democratic Socialist Republic of Sri Lanka. 1486. 23 February 2007.
