= Thamankaduwa Divisional Secretariat =

Thamankaduwa Divisional Secretariat: තමන්කඩුව ප්‍රාදේශීය ලේකම් කාර්යාලය (Sinhala); தமன்கடுவ பிரதேச செயலகம் (Tamil)
- Divisional Secretariat
- Country: Sri Lanka
- Province: North Central Province
- District: Polonnaruwa District
- Time zone: UTC+5:30 (Sri Lanka Standard Time)
- Website: http://www.thamankaduwa.ds.gov.lk

Thamankaduwa Divisional Secretariat is a Divisional Secretariat of Polonnaruwa District, of North Central Province, Sri Lanka. It contains Parakrama Samudra and the historic ruins of the Polonnaruwa period.

== Demography-Religion ==
Religion in Thamankaduwa DS Division (2012)
1. Buddhist (81.4%)
2. Hindu (0.90%)
3. Muslim (16.0%)
4. Roman Catholic (1.20%)
5. Other Christian (0.50%)
6. Other (0.00%)

== Geography ==
Thamankaduwa DS division is 46,878.6 km^{2} (18,099.9 sq mi) in extent, with 55 Grama Niladhari divisions, 117 villages, and a population of 94,254.

It is bounded on the North by Lankapura Divisional Secretariat and Hingurakgoda Divisional Secretariat divisions, to the East by Dimbulagala Divisional Secretariat and Welikanda Divisional Secretariat divisions, on the South by the Matale District and on the West by Elahera Divisional Secretariat and Hingurakgoda Divisional Secretariat divisions.
