= Hingurakgoda Divisional Secretariat =

Hingurakgoda Divisional Secretariat Hingurakgoda Hingurakgoda
- Divisional Secretariat
- Interactive map of Hingurakgoda Divisional Secretariat
- Country: Sri Lanka
- Province: North Central Province
- District: Polonnaruwa District
- Time zone: UTC+5:30 (Sri Lanka Standard Time)

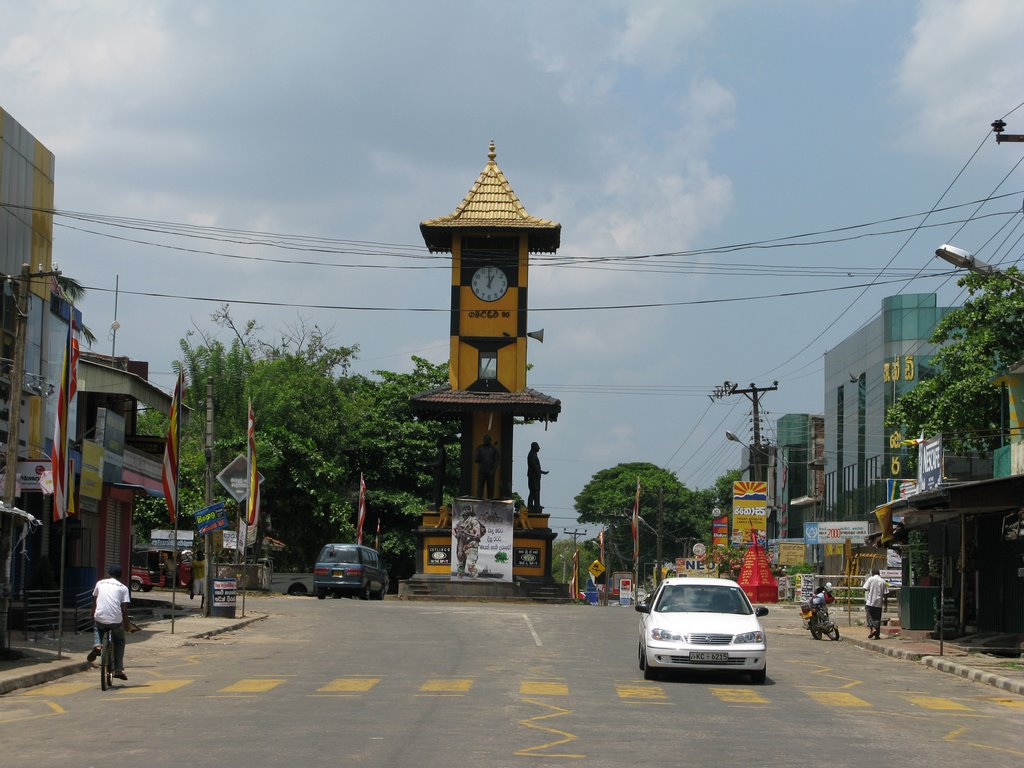

Hingurakgoda (Sinhala: හිගුරක්ගොඩ, Tamil: ஹிங்குராக்கொட) is a Divisional Secretariat of Polonnaruwa District, of North Central Province,Sri Lanka. Hingurakgoda is a vibrant town and serves as a significant cultural, historical, and agricultural hub in the area. Nestled in the North Central Province, the town is a gateway to the ancient and modern narratives of Sri Lanka, blending history with contemporary life.

The Polonnaruwa district has seven divisional secretariats. The largest division is Hingurakgoda, which covers an area of 70,878.33 hectares. In terms of its relative position, the division is bounded by the Anuradhapura district to the north and west, Elahera and Thamankaduwa to the south, Medirigiriya and Lankapura to the east.

According to its absolute location, Hingurakgoda is situated between latitudes 7°53´ and 8°22´ and longitudes 80°45´ and 81°02´E. The national grid system indicates that Hingurakgoda lies between the northern grid numbers 303–348 km and the eastern grid numbers 195–228 km.

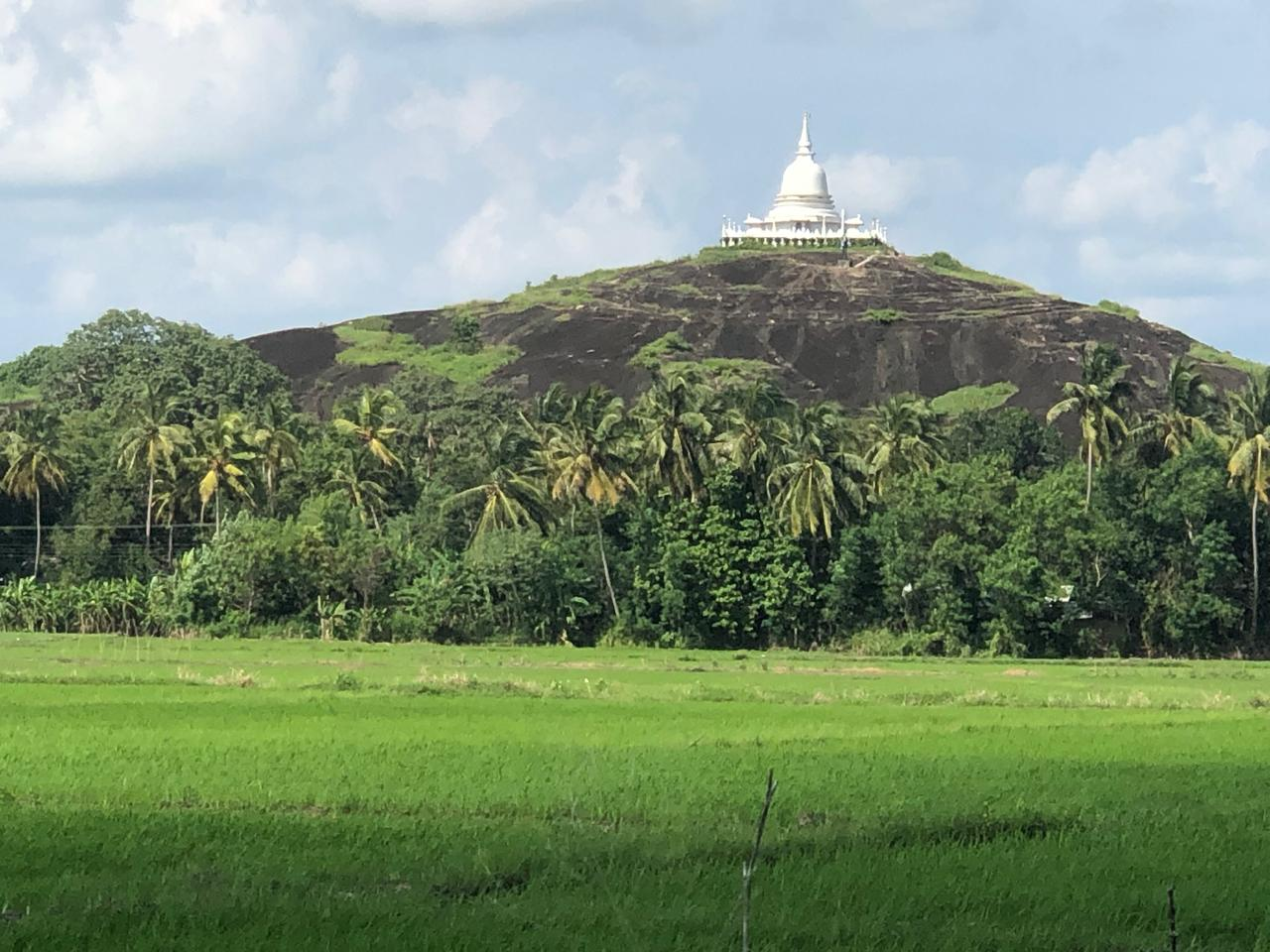
Lumbini Raja Maha Viharaya (Hingurakgala), Hingurakgoda

The division consists of 53 Grama Niladhari divisions. According to the 2012 population census, the population of Hingurakgoda is approximately 63,000.

== Demography-Religion ==
Religion in Hingurakgoda DS Division (2012)
1. Buddhist (96.6%)
2. Hindu (0.30%)
3. Muslim (1.00%)
4. Roman Catholic (1.60%)
5. Other Christian (0.50%)
6. Other (0.00%)

== Historical Background ==
Hingurakgoda has historical significance that dates back to the era of Sri Lanka's ancient kings. Situated in close proximity to the ancient city of Polonnaruwa (approx. 15 km), the town likely played a supportive role during the Polonnaruwa Kingdom (11th to 13th century CE). Polonnaruwa was a thriving administrative and cultural center, and its influence extended to neighboring regions, including Hingurakgoda. Although Hingurakgoda itself does not feature prominently in ancient chronicles, archaeological findings suggest that it was inhabited during these early periods, potentially serving as an agricultural or trade center supporting the larger kingdom.

== Important Religious and Cultural Places ==
Hingurakgoda is home to various religious and cultural landmarks that reflect the town's diversity and spiritual significance.

- Buddhist Temples
1. Unagalawehera Rajamaha Viharaya, Hingurakgoda: A historically significant Buddhist temple, which is situated about 7 km away from the town, is known for its serene environment and the ancient stupa. The temple serves as a center for Buddhist worship and cultural activities.
2. Somawathi Raja Maha Viharaya (nearby): Although not within the town limits, this temple is a short drive away and is one of the most revered sites in the region, believed to house a relic of the Buddha.
3. In addition, there are a few ancient temples in the Hingurakgoda area such as Hingurakgala Temple which is a Buddhist temple where there is a stupa on top of a rock.
- Catholic Churches
  1. Christ the King Church: A prominent Catholic church that caters to the Christian community in Hingurakgoda. Initially Hingurakgoda was a mission place operated by the Diocese of Trinco – Batticalo, Which used to send at different periods various priests to cater to the spiritual needs of the few Catholic families living in the whole area of Hingurakgoda and Polonnaruwa. As a result late Rev. Fr. Sam Alexander who belonged to the Diocese of Trinco- Batticalo came to Hingurakgoda in 1945. He got government land and started a little Church building and a school which is now known as Rajarata Maha Vidyalaya. The parish of Hingurakgoda is dedicated to Christ the King, and belongs to diocese of Anuradhapura, and is in the deanery of Polonnaruwa.
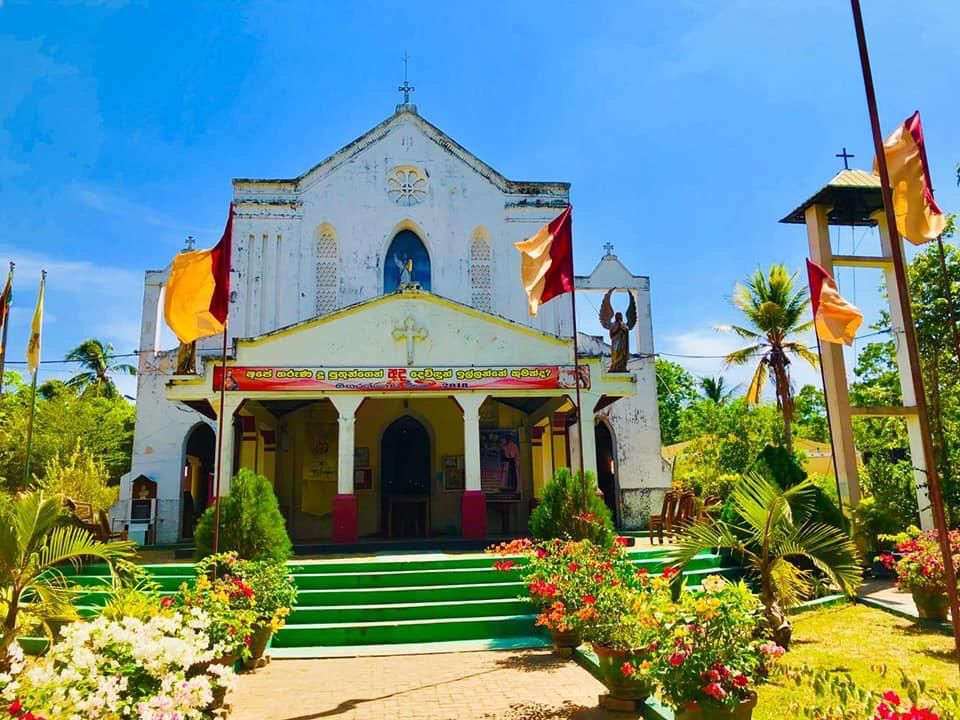
    Christ the King Church, Hingurakgoda
- Mosques
  1. Hingurakgoda Mohaideen Jumma Mosque: Serving the Muslim community in Hingurakgoda, this mosque is a hub for Islamic religious and cultural practices. It stands as a testament to the town's multi-religious harmony.

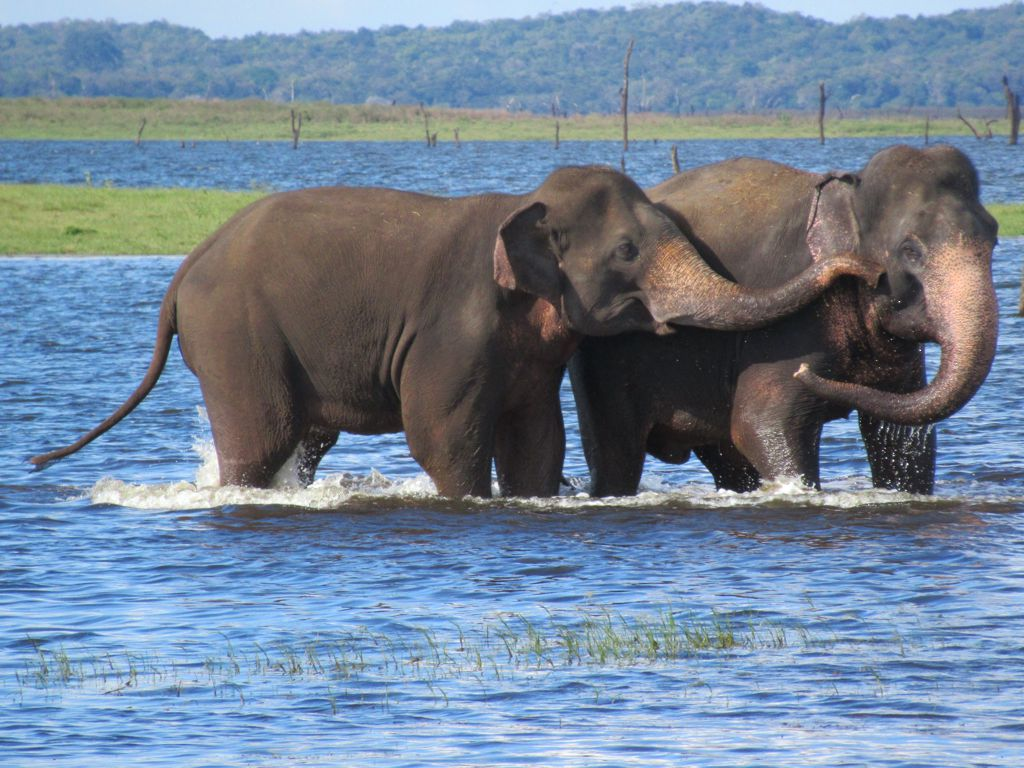
Kaudulla National Park is a popular tourist destination near Hingurakgoda

== Economy ==
The economy of Hingurakgoda is primarily agrarian. The town is renowned for its paddy cultivation, supported by an intricate irrigation system dating back to ancient times. Hingurakgoda is located near the Minneriya and Kaudulla tanks, which provide water for farming. In addition to agriculture, small-scale industries and trade contribute to the local economy. Hingurakgoda is known for its H4 rice variety.

== Education ==
Hingurakgoda boasts several educational institutions, ranging from primary schools to higher education centers. These institutions cater to a diverse student population, emphasizing the importance of education in regional development. There are 33 schools in the Hingurakgoda Educational Zone. Some of the schools in the area are as follows;

1. Ananda Balika National School, Hingurakgoda
2. Rajarata Maha Vidyalaya, Hingurakgoda
3. Minneriya Central College, Hingurakgoda
4. Vidyaloka Primary College, Hingurakgoda

== Transportation ==
The town is well-connected by road and rail. The Hingurakgoda Railway Station is part of Sri Lanka's Eastern Railway Line, facilitating easy access to Colombo, Polonnaruwa, and Trincomalee. Buses and other modes of transport make Hingurakgoda a central hub for commuters.

The part of Colombo - Trincomalee main road (A06 Grade) runs through Habarana and Kanthale. Also the part of Maradankadawala - Batticolo main road (A11 Grade) runs through Habarana and Polonnaruwa.

== Other Attractions ==
1. Minneriya National Park: Located nearby, the park is famous for its "Gathering" of elephants and serves as a key wildlife attraction.
2. Kaudulla National Park: Another wildlife sanctuary close to Hingurakgoda, known for its biodiversity and birdwatching opportunities.
3. Ancient Irrigation Systems: Visitors can explore the remnants of ancient irrigation marvels, including canals and tanks, which underscore the engineering ingenuity of Sri Lanka's past.
4. Hingurakgoda Airport
5. CIC Farm - Hingurakgoda

== History of Hingurakgoda Divisional Seceateries ==
Serial No	Name	Designation	Period
01	Mr.Vimalasena	Dpy Govt Agent SL.A.S I	1967 - 1977.01.31
02	Mr. A.P.L. Chandrasinha	Dpy Govt Agent SL.A.S I	1977.02.01 - 1989.09.27
03	Mr.R.M.K.B. Disanayaka	SL.A.S II/II	1990.02.15 - 1991.10.15
04	Mr.W.M Walisundara	SL.A.S II/II	1991.10.16 - 1992.08.13
05	Mr.Victor Samaraweera	SL.A.S I	
06	Mr.N.M. Ferminas	SL.A.S	1994.11.02
07	Mr.H.N. De Soysa	SL.A.S	
08	Mr.P. Rajapaksha	SL.A.S I	1995.12.30 - 2000.08.20
09	Mr.W.M. Gunawardhana	SL.A.S II/II	1995.12.30 - 2000.08.20
10	Mrs.E.A Swarna Edirisingha	SL.A.S II/II	2004.09.22
11	Mr.V.A.B.W. Dayananda	SL.A.S I	2009.09.02 - 2011.05.25
12	Mr.Sirimewan Dharmasena	SL.A.S I	2011.05.25

== Citizen Charter of Grama Niladhari ==
Serial No	Service provided	Service provided by GN	Max time taken to service
1	Issuing of character/resident certificate	If certificates are available If certifying the residency	15 min 3 days
2	Recommendation for income certificates	Giving recommendation to Divisional Secretary	03 days
3	Issuing Valuation certificate	Giving recommendation to Divisional Secretary	02 days
4	Assessment report	Giving recommendation to Divisional Secretary	02 days
5	Certifying identity card applications	Certifying and submit to Divisional Secretary Delivering Identity card for applicants	07 days 03 days
6	Cutting jack trees	To cut one tree More than one	01 day 03 days
7	Permits for timber transportations	Giving recommendation to Divisional Secretary Sealing of tree	02 days ½ Day
8	Recommendation of gun license	Giving recommendation to Divisional Secretary	03 days
9		Giving recommendation	03 days
10	Providing report on death persons	Report of natural death	03 hours
11	Giving reports of complains	If it happened in existing year If it happened in previous year	01 day 03 days
12	Recommendation for public aids	Giving recommendation to Divisional Secretary	03 days
13	Registration of past births	Giving recommendation	03 days
14	Recommendation for scholarship applications	Giving recommendation to Divisional Secretary	02 days
15	Permits for animal transportations	Giving recommendation to Divisional Secretary	03 days
16	Giving assessments for ownership of lands	Giving recommendation to Divisional Secretary	03 days
17	Recommendations for electricity & water	Giving recommendation	03 days
18	Recommendation for ......	Submit urgent reports to Divisional Secretary Submit detailed reportsSubmit urgent reports to Divisional Secretary	06 hours 03 days
19		Giving recommendation	03 days
20	Giving reports & recommendations for arising needs	Giving recommendation	03 days
21	Registrations of voluntary societies	Giving recommendations if there needed documents	03 days
22	Duties on crown lands	Reporting of unauthorized residents Submitting other documents to Divisional Secretary	Immediately 07 days
23	Issuing permits for stone/sand	Giving recommendation to Divisional Secretary	07 days
24	Permits of liquor	Giving recommendation to Divisional Secretary	07 days
25	Duties as peace officers	Settlement of disputes	03 days
26	Aids on presidential funds	Giving recommendation to Divisional Secretary	02 days

== Citizen Charter of Divisional Secretariat ==
Serial No	Service provided	Main document to be produced	Max time taken to serve	Main officer responsible
1	countersigning of residency certificates	National Identity Card	03 Minutes	Certification officer/AO/Ast.Div.Sec
2	Issuing of valuation certificates	Completed certificate	½ Hour	Divisional Secretary
3	Issuing of income certificates	Application certified by the div secretariat	½ Hour	Asst Div Sec/Div Sec
4	Issuing Birth/Death/Marriage Certificates	Formless process	05 Minutes	Additional Dist. Registrar
5	Approval to release of compulsory savings	Respective application form	05 Minutes	Div Sec/Ast.Div.Sec
6	Issuing Dry Rations cards	Relevant application	10 Minutes	Asst Div Sec
7	Issuing of Income certificate	Application with the documents	1 Hour	Accountant
8	Issuing of assessment certificate	Assets deed with recommendation from GN	½ Hour	Div Sec
9	Issuing of land license after approval	Approved Application	1 Day	Div Sec
10	Recommendation of miscellaneous subsidies	Prescribe from with recommendation from social services officer	1 Weeks	Div Sec / Asst Div Sec
11	Approval of public donations	Prescribe from with recommendation from social services officer	4 Days	Div Sec / Asst Div Sec
12	Payments of samurdhi grants	Application with written supporting documents	3 Days	Div Sec/Ast.Div.Sec
13	Subsidies paid by Social Development Fund	Application with recommendation	1 Days	Div Sec
14	Provision of solutions for electricity objections	Electricity objections summons letter	2 Weeks	Div Sec/Ast.Div.Sec
15	Approval of loans mortgages on land title deed	Land title deed	1 Day	Div Sec
16	Recommending Electricity Application	Recommended application with deed	½ Hour	AO/Asst Div Sec
17	Issuing of license to transport animals	Application approved by veterinary surgeon	½ Hour	Asst Div Sec
18	Issuing of timber permit	Recommended Application	2 Days	Div Sec
19	Issuing of senior citizenship Identity Card	Birth Certificate or Identity card	1 Day	Asst Div Sec
20	Transferring of ownership of gift of land	Deed of land and application	2 Weeks	Div Sec
21	Naming of succession for gifted land	Common 155 application with recommendation	3 Weeks	Div Sec
22	Registration of birth after prescribe time	Application together with documentary evidence	4 Weeks	Additional District Registrar
23	Provision of disaster loans	Application with recommended from GN /	2 Weeks	Asst Div Sec
24	Issuing of timber transport license	Application	4 Weeks	Div Sec
25	Naming of transfer of license land	License and GN report	1 Day	Div Sec
26	Issuing of liquor permit	Recommended report from excise dept	2 Hours	Div Sec
27	Submitting of National Identity Card to RGD	Application recommended by GN	3 Days	AO/Asst Div Sec
