= Senapura Rehabilitation Centre =

Rehabilitation centre in Sri Lanka

General information
- Type: Rehabilitation center
- Location: Welikanda, Polonnaruwa, Sri Lanka

Other information
- Facilities: l

Senapura Rehabilitation Centre is a rehabilitation centre located in the Welikanda Divisional Secretariat, Polonnaruwa District, North Central Province in Sri Lanka. The rehabilitation centre is currently used to treat drug addicts and COVID-19 patients along with Kandakadu Treatment and Rehabilitation Centre.

The rehabilitation centre was also used as a workshop to give counselling to former LTTE members and awareness about environmental conservation by the Ministry of Environment.

In March 2020, the rehabilitation centre was proposed by the Government of Sri Lanka as one of the major quarantine centres to conduct PCR tests for passengers and tourists from foreign countries during the COVID-19 pandemic. In August 2020 the Sri Lankan government made compulsory guidelines for foreign passengers to undergo a 14-day mandatory self quarantine at the centre.
