= Kandakadu Treatment and Rehabilitation Centre =

Rehabilitation centre in Sri Lanka

- Former names: Kandakadu Drug Rehabilitation Centre

General information
- Type: Rehabilitation center
- Location: Welikanda, Polonnaruwa, Sri Lanka

Other information
- Facilities: medical tools, Wi-Fi communication

Kandakadu Treatment and Rehabilitation Centre previously known as the Kandakadu Drug Rehabilitation Centre is a rehabilitation center located in the Welikanda, Polonnaruwa District, North Central Province in Sri Lanka. It is currently operated by the Bureau of the Commissioner General of Rehabilitation under the Ministry of Justice. The rehabilitation centre is currently used to treat drug addicts and COVID-19 patients along with Senapura Rehabilitation Center. The centre was transformed into a Drug Rehabilitation Centre in 2014 to treat drug addicted persons by giving counselling, vocational education and training.

== History ==
In March 2020, the rehabilitation centre was proposed by the Government of Sri Lanka as one of the major quarantine centres to conduct PCR tests for passengers and tourists from foreign countries during the COVID-19 pandemic. The Sri Lankan government made compulsory guidelines for passengers from foreign passengers to undergo a 14-day mandatory self quarantine at the centre. The Sri Lankan Army in collaboration with the Ministry of Health upgraded the facilities of the centre by setting up necessary medical tools, Wifi communication tools, thermometers, laundry and entertainment facilities for the patients.

In July 2020, the centre became a new epicentre of COVID-19 pandemic in Sri Lanka recording over 300 cases in the month of July. On 9 July 2020, Sri Lankan Army converted a quarantine centre into a COVID-19 hospital which is close to the Kandakadu Rehabilitation Centre.

== COVID-19 cluster ==
On 7 July, a new case was recorded from Welikada Prison, where an inmate had been transferred from the Treatment and Rehabilitation Centre in East Kandakadu for those addicted to drugs and controlled substances, to the prison on 27 June. On 9 July 2020, a record tally of 253 inmates at Kandakadu Treatment and Rehabilitation Centre were tested positive for COVID-19. On 10 July 2020, a total of 283 people from the Kandakadu Treatment and Rehabilitation Centre were tested positive for COVID-19. The centre emerged as a new COVID-19 cluster in the country.

== Frequent Clashes & Controversies ==
The military's key involvement at the center has often been a topic of controversy amongst human rights activists. Several clashes and inmate breakouts were reported in the recent past. Including the 2022 November clashes the December 2023 escape and the January 2024 clash and breakout.
