= Ajri =

Ajri may refer to:

- Ajri, India, a village in India
- Ajri Demirovski, Yugoslavian Turkish singer
