= Kithalagama Sri Seelalankara Thera =

Sri Lankan Buddhist Monk

Ven. Kithalagama Sri Seelalankara Thera
- පූජ්‍ය කිතලගම ශ්‍රී සීලාලංකාර හිමි
- Ven Thera c. 1960s.
- Title: Chief Incumbent of the Dimbulagala Rajamaha Vihara

Personal life
- Born: Hewa Dulige Charlis; 29 May 1924 Matara, British Ceylon
- Died: 26 May 1995 (aged 70) Dimbulagala, Sri Lanka
- Cause of death: murder
- Parent(s): Hewa Dulige Dionysus (father), Sainahamy (mother)
- Other name: Dimbulagala Hamuduruwo

Religious life
- Religion: Buddhism
- School: Theravada
- Dharma names: Matara Kithalagama Sri Seelalankara Thero

Matara Kithalagama Sri Seelalankara Thera (29 May 1924 - 26 May 1995), also known as Dimbulagala Hamuduruwo, was a 20th century Sri Lankan Buddhist monk. He was a pioneer in restoring the ancient Buddhist monastery Dimbulagala Raja Maha Vihara in the 1950s and was the chief incumbent of the monastery for almost four decades.

== Early life ==
Seelalankara was born Hewa Dulige Charlis on 29 May 1924 to Hewa Dulige Dionysus and Sainahamy of the Durava caste in Matara, Sri Lanka.

Seelalankara entered priesthood at age 22 and became a student of the Matara Walpita Aranya Senadhipathi Badulla Pannalankara Thero. He went on to Polonnaruwa to meditate and came to the Palugasdamana area in Kaduruwela. There, he used a small building in the cemetery to meditate on a banyan tree. When the area became highly populated, he moved to Handapangala forest and lived in a cave in the Sorawila area. He lived a modest life, dedicating himself to the development of the ancient monastery and to uplifting of the poor peasants who lived in the surrounding areas of the Polonnaruwa District in North Central Province. He established a village school with the Sinhala-speaking people in Sorawila, which later become Sorawila Maha Vidyalaya.

== Life in Dimbulagala ==
After his return to Dimbulagala in 1954, he took several steps to enhance the livelihood of the local people. During this period, all the caves were inhabited by Vedda people. He then proceeded to nearby villages such as Millana, Dalukana, Elle Wewa, Alawathu Kumbura, Weliknada and Aralaganwila to inquire into the plight of the villagers, providing grain and vegetables as well as clothes to those in need. Under his supervision and religious guidance, the people in Dimbulagala began farming instead of hunting.

One of the children of Vedinayake Millana, for the first time, left the secular life and became a monk. He was ordained as Millane Siriyalankara Thero and later served as the Chief Incumbent of the Dimbulagala Viharaya. Later he anointed Tamil and Muslim children and endowed them to the Buddha Sasana. Also, for the first time, more than 20 people representing the Veddhas joined the monks. As the spiritual leader of the area, he ordered all the regional representatives and politicians to develop tanks, culverts and roads in Dimbulagala and surrounding areas. On 12 June 1979, Seelalankara was appointed as the Chief Sanghanayaka of the North and East Tamankaduwa Provinces. In June 1967 he established Dibulagala Maha Kashyapa Pirivena.

== Death ==
On 26 May 1995, Seelalankara was shot and killed by the Liberation Tigers of Tamil Eelam when he was on his way to visit a farm belonging to the temple. He provided moral support to the poor people living in border villages to fight LTTE intrusions into their villages. He was the chief Sanghanayaka of the Northern and Eastern provinces and Tamankaduva area at the time of his death. Sri Lanka Post issued a postage stamp on July 21, 2005, to commemorate his valuable service to the nation.

A few days before his death, the Army unit deployed to protect Seelalankara was removed and two policemen had been deployed. The vehicle was hit by 87 bullets. According to Maldeniye Jinalankara Thero, the chief incumbent of the Dimbulagala Raja Maha Vihara at the time, the chief monk was not killed by the LTTE terrorists but by others who blamed the LTTE.
