= Walter Kalasooriya =

Walter Kulasooriya is a Sri Lankan painter and former curator of the Visiki Art Gallery.

== Early life ==
Walter Kulasooriya was born on 11 April 1945, in the fishing village of Demataluwa, Sri Lanka. He studied at the College of Fine Arts in Colombo under artists such as Stanley Abeysinghe, David Paynter, S.P. Charles, Henry Dharmasena and Gunasiri Kolambage.

... I did portrait painting under the able guidance of Stanley Abeysinghe and fine honed my skills in mural paintings under Henry Dharmasena.

— Walter Kalasooriya, http://archives.dailynews.lk/2005/06/06/fea06.htm

In addition to holding shows in his native Sri Lanka, Walter Kulasooriya has conducted successful exhibitions in the United States, Germany, Austria, Australia, and England, among other places.

=== Tsunami ===
Kulasooriya is a survivor of the 2004 Indian Ocean earthquake. He and his wife narrowly escaped with their lives, holding on to a wooden pillar on the roof to keep above the waves. His paintings, however, along with the Visiki Art Gallery, were washed away.

He was a victim of looting in the aftermath of the disaster. His computer and several other items were stolen when his house was robbed.

Walter Kulasooriya is currently seeking the means to rebuild the Visiki Art Gallery. With it, he hopes to introduce the craft of painting to people whose livelihood may have been devastated by the tsunami. Trained as professional painters, they can regain economic independence lost with the collapse of local trade.

== Style ==
Walter Kulasooriya works in classical, native, and modern styles. He does not identify with a particular school of painting.

Perhaps Kulasooriya's most significant stylistic innovation is his Earth Color paintings. Composed with colors mixed with his own hand, using the same recipes as those employed by the painters of the Sigiriya frescoes, these works are a modern attempt to synchronize with nature.

== Guinness record ==
Kulasooriya gained international attention for his 100-metre painting of the Sinharaja Forest Reserve which, in 1996, was judged to be the longest painting in the world. It can be viewed at the Deer Park Hotel in Giritale.

== Awards ==
- Presidential Award - 1996 (Sri Lanka)
- Presidential Award - 1997 (Sri Lanka)
- Presidential Award - 1998 (Sri Lanka)
- Presidential Award - 1999 (Sri Lanka)
- Prime Minister's Award - 1999 (Sri Lanka)
- Presidential Award - 2000 (Sri Lanka)
- Presidential Award - 2001 (Sri Lanka)
- Highly Commended - 2001 (Sri Lanka)
- Presidential Award - 2002 (Sri Lanka)
- Highly Commended - 2003 (Sri Lanka)
- Presidential Award - 2004 (Sri Lanka)
- Prime Minister's Award - 2004 (Sri Lanka)
- "Dhakshinaabhimani" Award - 2005
