= Bakamuna =

Bakamuna බකමුණ
- Village
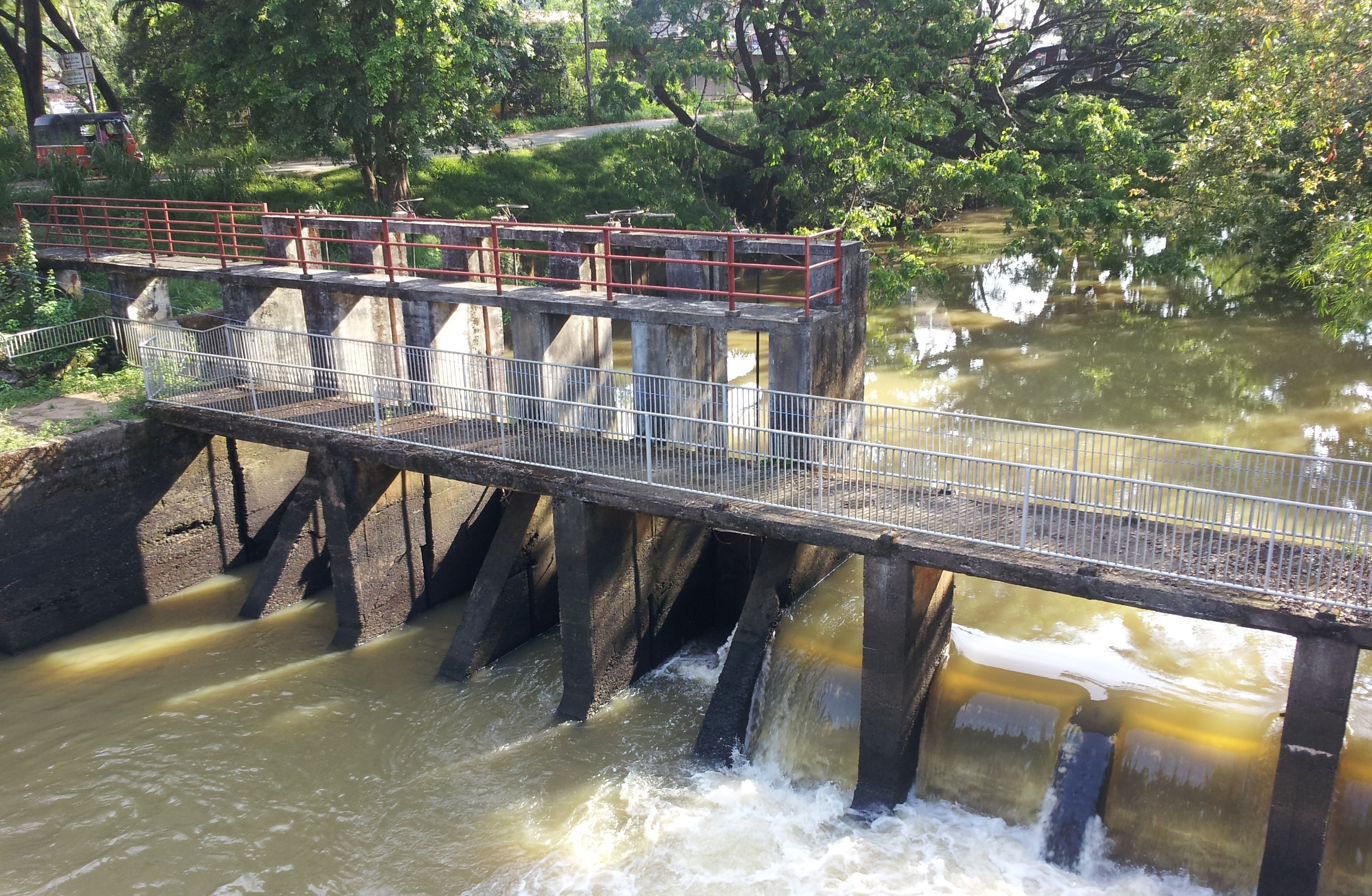
- Old bridge across the Yodha ela, Bakamuna

- Location within Sri Lanka
- Coordinates: 7°46′59″N 80°49′6″E
- Country: Sri Lanka
- Province: North Central Province
- District: Polonnaruwa District

Government
  - Type: Elahera Divisional Secretariat
  - President: Mr. Ranil Nanayakkara

Area
  - Total: 349 km^{2} (135 sq mi)

Population (census in 20 March 2012)
  - Total: 43,915
  - Density: 125.8/km^{2} (326/sq mi)
- Time zone: UTC+5:30 (Time in Sri Lanka)
- Postal code: 51250
- Area code: 066
- Website: for school = plbmcc.sch.lk/web/

Bakamuna (Sinhala: බකමුණ) is a village town in Sri Lanka. It is located within North Central Province.

== History ==
It has many ancient ruins in Sri Lanka such as Buduruwayaya temple, Oru bedi Siyambalawa, and the city is located near Moragahakanda reservoir with Mahaweli River tributary Amban Ganga. At the time of King Mahasen, the village was known as "Bakka amuna - Bakka Dam". The city got its name from the reservoir called Bak Amuna Pathaha which had a large basin (reservoir). Today this reservoir has been rehabilitated as a tank and it belongs to the Minneriya Giritale Forest Reserve.

An agricultural settlement based on paddy cultivation, the settlements in this forest area were established in the 1940s during the time of Prime Minister D. S. Senanayake. The nearby Amban River originates in the vicinity of the Dumbara Hills in Matale and the Nalanda Hills. King Vasabha built the Elahera Anicut and Canal which is 48 km in length, by crossing the anicuts at the Elahera, Ambanganga, a major branch of the Mahaweli. King Mahasen later extended this canal. Heerati Oya, Amboku Oya and Kalu Ganga are tributaries of Amban Ganga. Heerati Oya and Kalu Ganga join the Amban Ganga near Bakamuna.

The village is a part of Accelerated Mahaweli Development Project included to "System G" previously, which was renamed as "System Moragahakanda". In 1988, a corundum-bearing skarn deposit was discovered. The city is bordered by Minneriya National Park where continuous human-wildlife conflict is a common scene around the city.

The cities around Bakamuna are, Dambulla, Puwakgahaulpota, Elahera, Siyambalawa, Heeratiya, Aththanakadawala, Kalu ganga, Handungamuwa, Damanayaya, Diyabeduma, Giritale, Atharagallawa, Kottapitiya and Galmulla. Yodha Ela canal flows through the Amban River and supplies water to the paddy fields in the area. Orubedi Siyambalawa is located on the banks of the Yoda Ela. The historic tamarind tree is also known as an archeological protection plant where the legends has it that King Mahasen traveled along the Elahera canal and tied a boat to this tree. There is also a deity shrine dedicated to King Mahasen nearby.

The Buduruwayaya Temple with sacred reclining Buddha statue is located about 6 km along the Dambulla-Hettipola road from Bakamuna town which is surrounded by the Amban river and Wasgamuwa National Park. According to history, the temple was completed by King Parakramabahu the Great. The reclining Buddha statue is a 25 feet long reclining statue made of moonstone. Scattered around it are ancient ruins as well as ancient pagoda and stone tablets. The ruins of a place believed to be the palace of King Parakramabahu can be seen in a vast forest about six kilometers from this sleeping statue.

The ruins in Kumara Ella, near the Atharagallewa bridge on the Hettipola road were excavated in 2004. There is an old polling station which was the place where monks used to take hot baths and herbal water baths when they were sick. There is also a Bodhi tree nearby.

== School ==
The town has school, Mahasen Central College, established on 1 June 1948, under the name "Bakamuna Mahasen Madya Maha Vidyalaya", with the principal R.M Rathnayake. Now the school is separated as primary and secondary sections and both sections have two different principals. In 2019, the school was lifted to National School by the president Maithripala Sirisena.

== Hospital ==
Bakamuna regional hospital is the best closest hospital to Dambulla and Polonnaruwa. In 2018, Kidney Disease Prevention Unit and outpatient treatment buildings was developed under the 'Pibidena Polonnaruwa Development Program' by President Sirisena.
