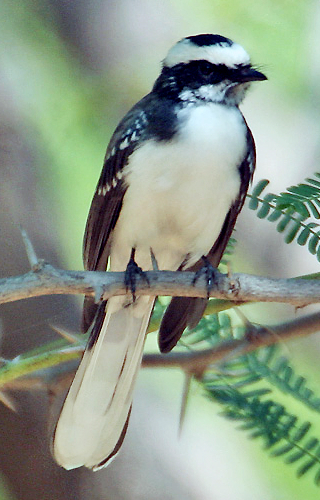

Conservation status
- Least Concern (IUCN 3.1)

Scientific classification
- Kingdom: Animalia
- Phylum: Chordata
- Class: Aves
- Order: Passeriformes
- Family: Rhipiduridae
- Genus: Rhipidura
- Species: R. aureola

Binomial name
- Rhipidura aureola Lesson, 1831

= White-browed fantail =

Species of bird

The white-browed fantail (Rhipidura aureola) is a small passerine bird belonging to the family Rhipiduridae.

== Description ==
The adult white-browed fantail is about 18 cm long. It has dark brown upperparts, with white spots on the wings, and whitish underparts. The fan-shaped tail is edged in white, and the long white supercilia meet on the forehead. The throat and eyemask are blackish and border whitish moustachial stripes.

== Distribution and habitat ==
The white-browed fantail breeds across tropical regions of the Indian subcontinent and Southeast Asia. The species ranges from eastern Pakistan to southern Indochina. It is found in forest and other woodland.

== Behaviour and ecology ==
Three eggs are laid in a small cup nest in a tree. The white-browed fantail is insectivorous, and often fans its tail as it moves through the undergrowth.

== Gallery ==
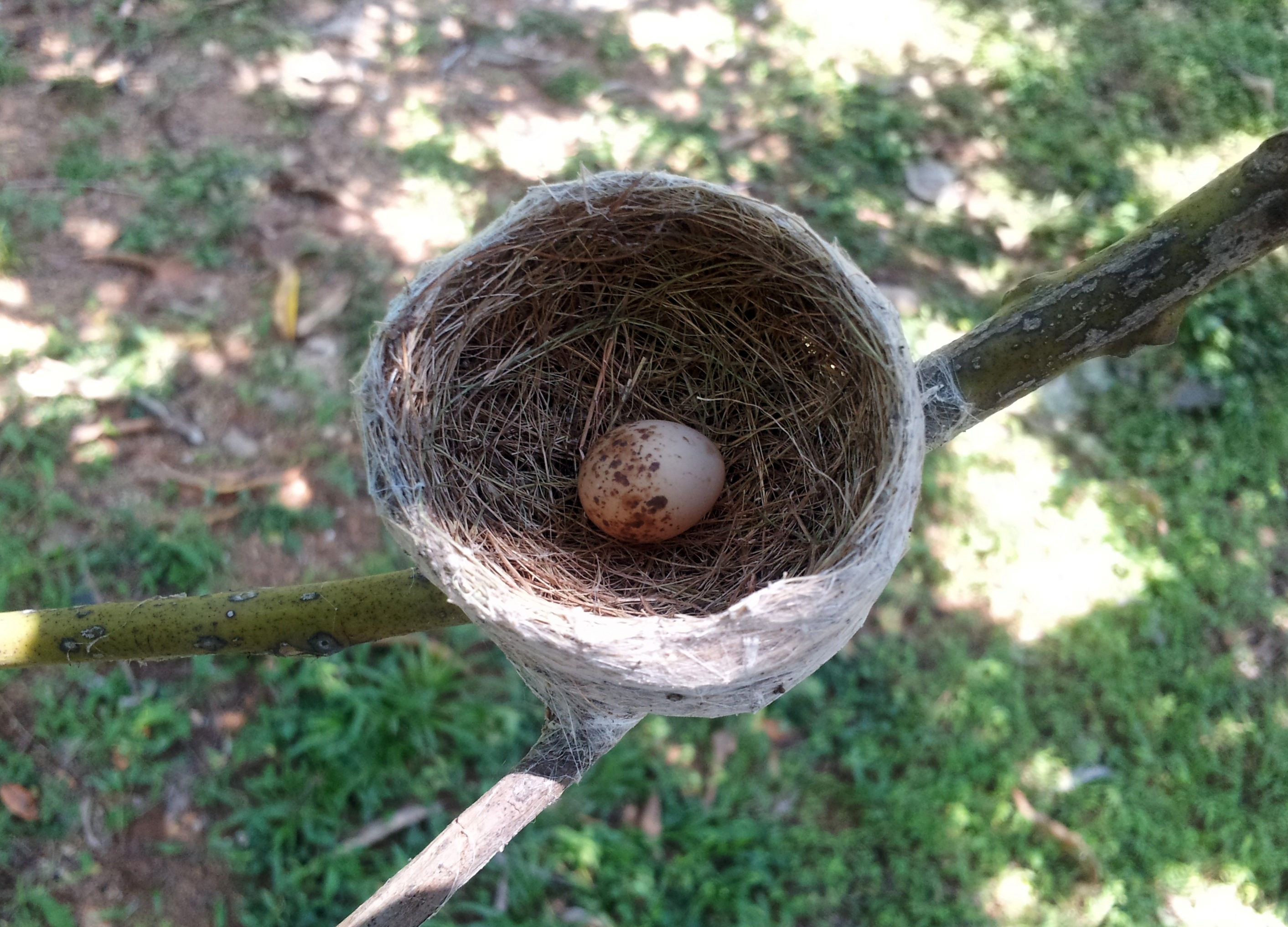
White-browed Fantail nest with an egg on mango tree branch - In Bakamuna, Sri Lanka.

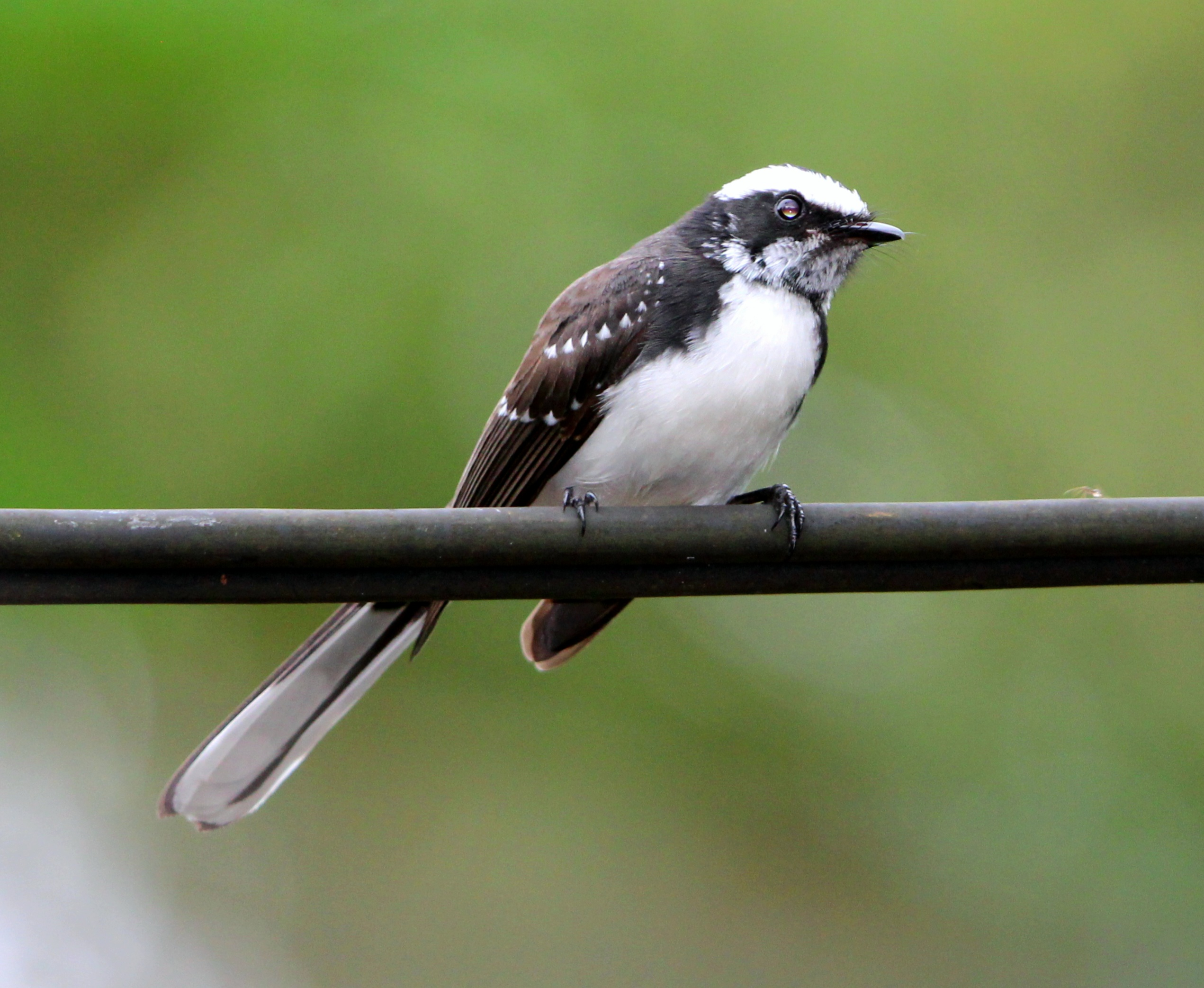
White-browed Fantail from Matale, Sri Lanka.

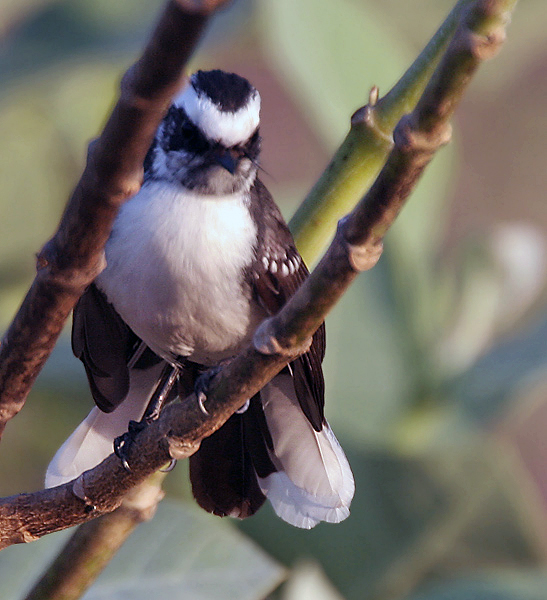
At Sindhrot in Vadodara District of Gujarat, India.

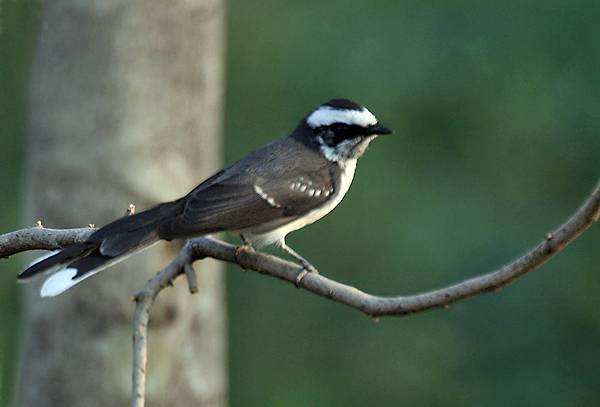
At Sindhrot in Vadodara District of Gujarat, India.

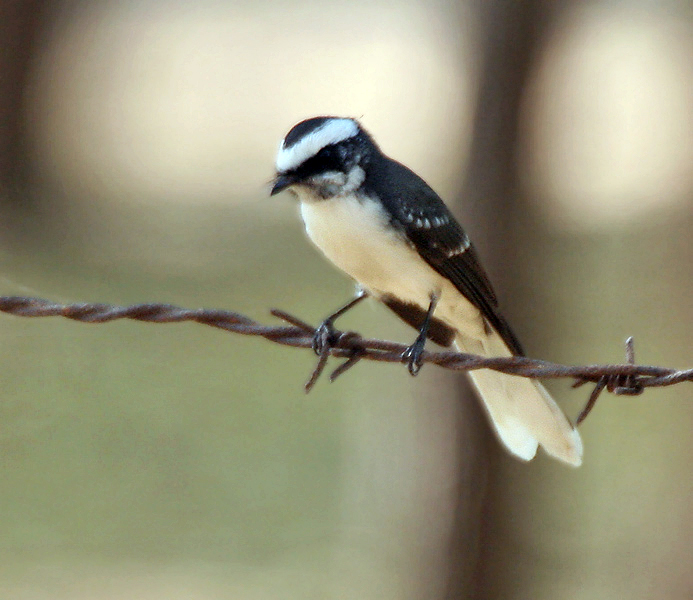
At Sindhrot in Vadodara District of Gujarat, India.

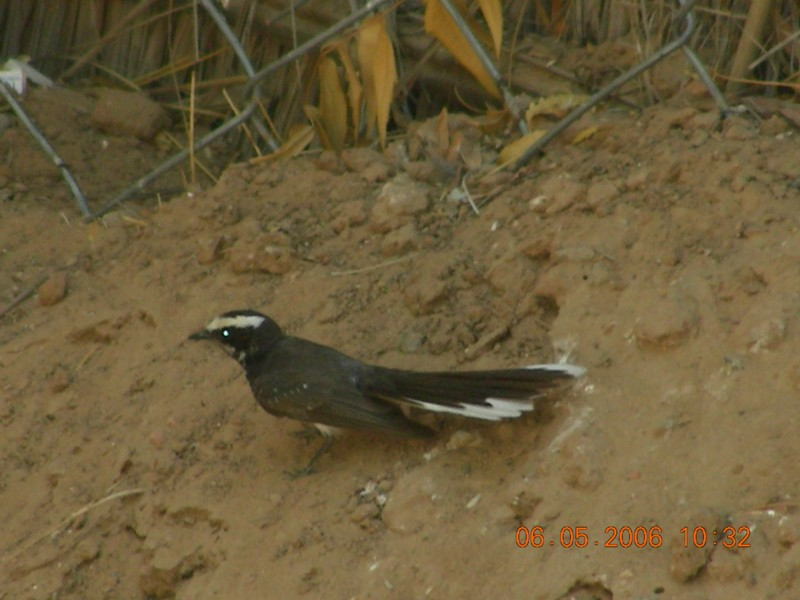
In Thar Desert, India.

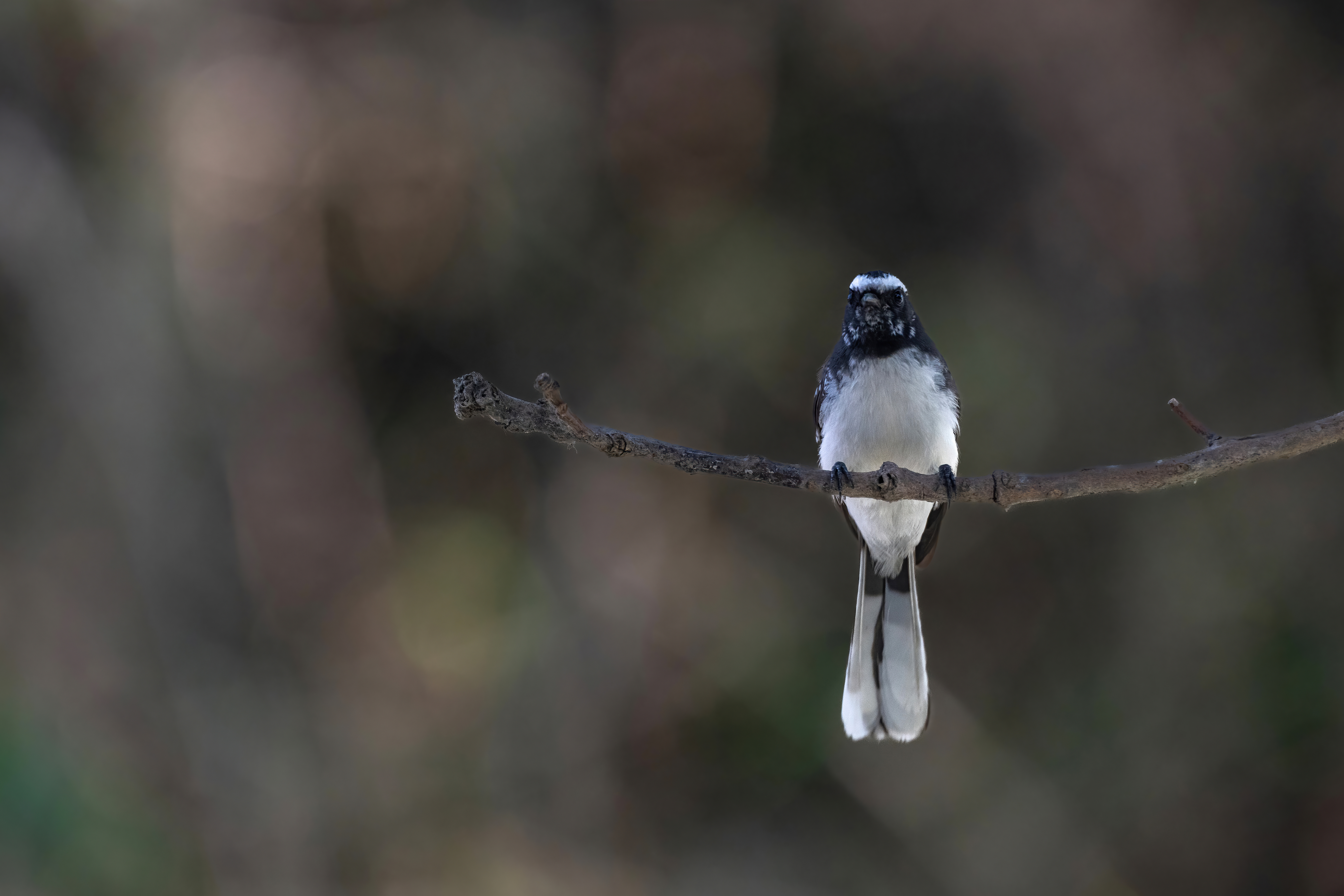
In Koshi Tappu Wildlife Reserve, Nepal.
