= Unagalawehera Rajamaha Viharaya, Hingurakgoda =

Buddhist temple in Sri Lanka

- උණගලාවෙහෙර රාජමහා විහාරය, හිඟුරක්ගොඩ
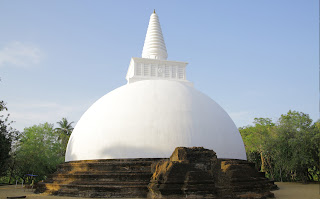

- Location within Sri Lanka

Religion
- Affiliation: Buddhism
- District: Polonnaruwa
- Province: North Central Province

Location
- Location: Hingurakgoda, Sri Lanka
- Coordinates: 08°00′49.2″N 80°59′23.1″E

Architecture
- Type: Buddhist Temple

The Unagalawehera Rajamaha Viharaya is a Buddhist temple in Hingurakgoda, Sri Lanka. It is 6 km (3.7 mi) south of Hingurakgoda and 7 km (4.3 mi) north of Polonnaruwa. It is an ancient site with temple complexes and ruins which are considered to belong to the early period of the Anuradhapura era.

== Ancient stupa ==
The Unagalavehera Stupa is the second largest stupa outside of Polonnaruwa. The stupa is 30 metres (98 ft) high.Legend has it that the stupa was built with lime mortar and that the layer of plaster was so thick that at that time it was called 'Hunugal Vehera' and later it was known as 'Unagala Vehera'.Other sources state that the stupa was later renamed as 'Uunagal Vehera' and later as 'Unagala Vehera' due to lack of stones during the construction of the stupa.During the reign of King Dutugemunu (161-137 BC) this area was known as 'Jayabima'.Later a stupa was built at this place in the 7th century AD and it was known as 'Jayabima Vehera'.There are two vahalkada on the north and south sides of the stupa, a ruined idol house on the west side and a small model of the stupa built by King Nissankamalla (1187-1196 AD) on the east side.

== Ancient monastery complex ==
During the reign of King Dappula IV (923-935 AD), this temple was known as Puvaram (Purvarama) Rajamaha Viharaya.This temple was affiliated to the Ritigala monastery. At that time, the land where this temple is currently located was known as 'Hinginiwella'. Later, this monastery complex was renovated by King Parakramabahu I (1153-1186 AD).This monastery complex has been constructed in the tradition of the Maha Vihara with the center of the stupa. The ruined buildings belonging to the monastery complex is located in the surrounding of stupa.

== Annual temple flower offering ceremony ==
The 'Annual Temple Flower Offering Ceremony' or 'Araliya Mal Poojawa' is Sri Lanka's first temple flower offering ceremony. The offering of one million temple flowers began in 1995.
