= Ajri, India =

Coordinates: 13°41′15.86″N 74°52′4.07″E

Ajri
- village
- Ajri is in Udupi district
- Interactive map of Ajri
- Country: India
- State: Karnataka
- District: Udupi district
- Tehsil: Kundapura
- Talukas: Kundapura

Government
  - Body: Village Panchayat
- Elevation: 13 m (43 ft)

Population (2011)
  - Total: 4,017

Languages
  - Official: Kannada
- Time zone: UTC+5:30 (IST)
- PIN: 576283
- Telephone code: 08254
- Vehicle registration: KA
- Nearest city: Udupi
- Civic agency: Village Panchayat

Ajri is a village in Kundapura taluk, Udupi district, Karnataka, India.

== Demographics ==
Kundapra kannada or kundagannada is the local language, but Kannada, Tulu, Konkani, Beary Bashe, Urdu and English are also spoken.

There are more females than males in Ajri, but the reverse is true among children under 7, about 10% of the population.

In 2011, Ajri had a lower literacy rate compared to the rest of Karnataka. (75.36% of Karnataka was literate, but only 72.44% of Ajri.) About 80% of males are literate in Ajri, but only about 66% of females.

== Politics ==
Ajri village is administrated by an elected representative Sarpanch according to the Constitution of India and the Panchyati Raaj Act.

== Location ==
Ajri is in the Kundapura taluk of Udupi district in Karnataka. It is located 49 km north of District headquarters in Udupi. It is also 26 km from Kundapura and 355 km from the state capital, Bangalore. Amparu ( 7 km ), Keradi ( 8 km ), Hallihole ( 8 km ), Hosangadi ( 9 km ), and Shankaranarayana ( 10 km ) are nearby villages. Kota, Udupi, Karkala, and Sagar are nearby cities. Ajri is surrounded by Hosanagara taluk to the north, Tirthahalli taluk towards the east, Udupi taluk at south, and Bhatkal taluk in the west. The Arabian Sea is close by.

Ajri's Postal Index Number is 576283 with the head post office in Hattiangadi.

== Transportation ==
Kundapur and Bhatkal are the nearest towns by road connectivity. They also have the closest railway stations. The nearest major railway station is 103 km away in Mangalore. The nearest airport is also Mangalore Airport at a distance of 90 km.

=== Nearby Railway Stations ===
- Kundapura- 21 km
- Senapura- 22 km
- Barkur- 30 km
- Bijoor Halt- 34 km

=== Places to Visit ===
- Kodachaadri- 9 km
- Kollur- 24 km
- Maravanthe- 30 km
- Agumbe- 33 km
- Udupi- 47 km
