= Dimbulagala =

- Gunner's Quoin
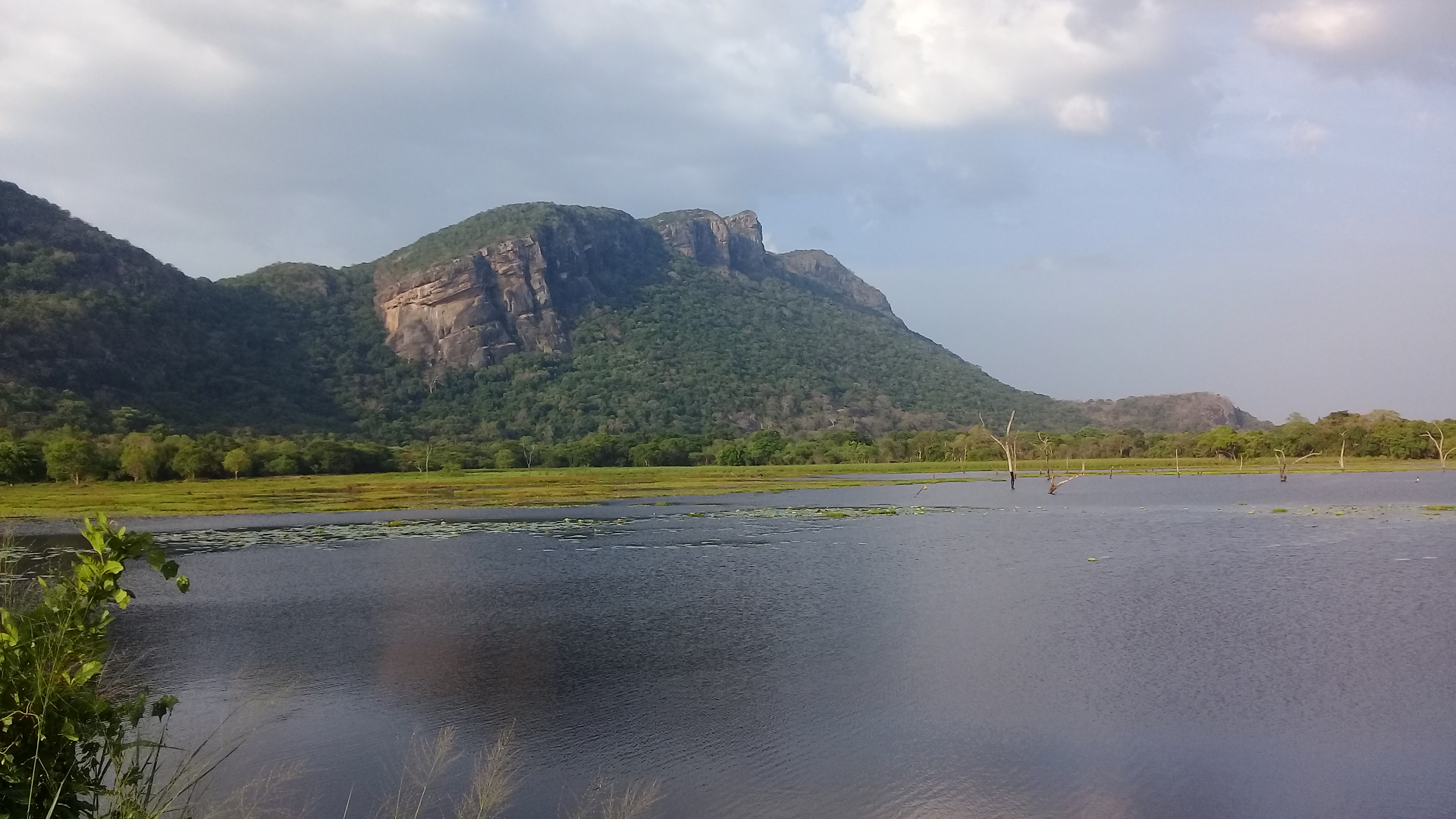

Highest point
- Elevation: 534 m (1,752 ft)
- Coordinates: 7°51′36″N 81°08′37″E

Geography
- Location within Sri Lanka
- Location: Sri Lanka

Dimbulagala also known as Gunner's Quoin or Gunner's Rock during the British colonial period, is a rock formation in the Polonnaruwa District of Sri Lanka. By the time anthropologist Charles Gabriel Seligman visited the location in 1911, a cave within the rock had become a refuge of the indigenous Vedda people. During the 12th century AD, The Sinhalese people had constructed a Buddhist monastery within the rock formation. The Dimbulagala Raja Maha Vihara monastery was restored in the 1950s. The villagers around the rock are of mixed Vedda and Sinhalese ancestry.

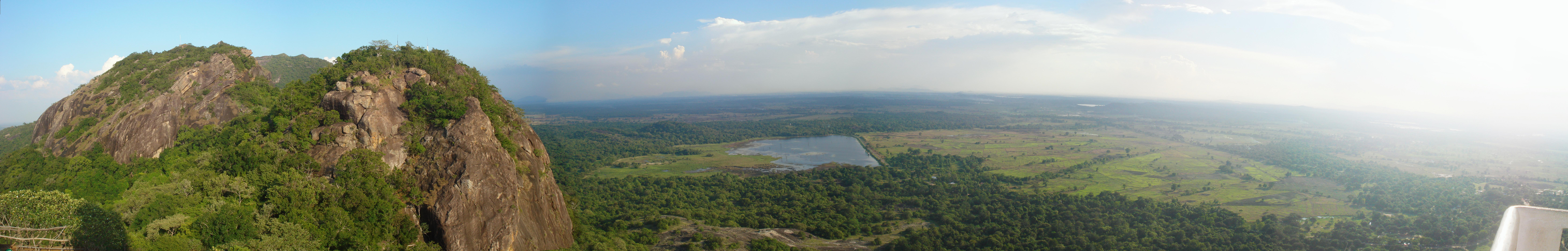
A panoramic photo over the Dimbulagala peak from "Sath Mahal Prasadaya".

== See also ==
- Dimbulagala Raja Maha Vihara
