= Somawathiya Chaitya =

Buddhist stupa in Sri Lanka

Prāchīna Nāgārāma Vihara (Formerly known as Somawathiya Chaitya)
- පූර්වෝක්ත සෝමාවතිය චෛත්‍ය (Sinhala); மேற்கூறிய சோமாவதி சைத்தியம் (Tamil)
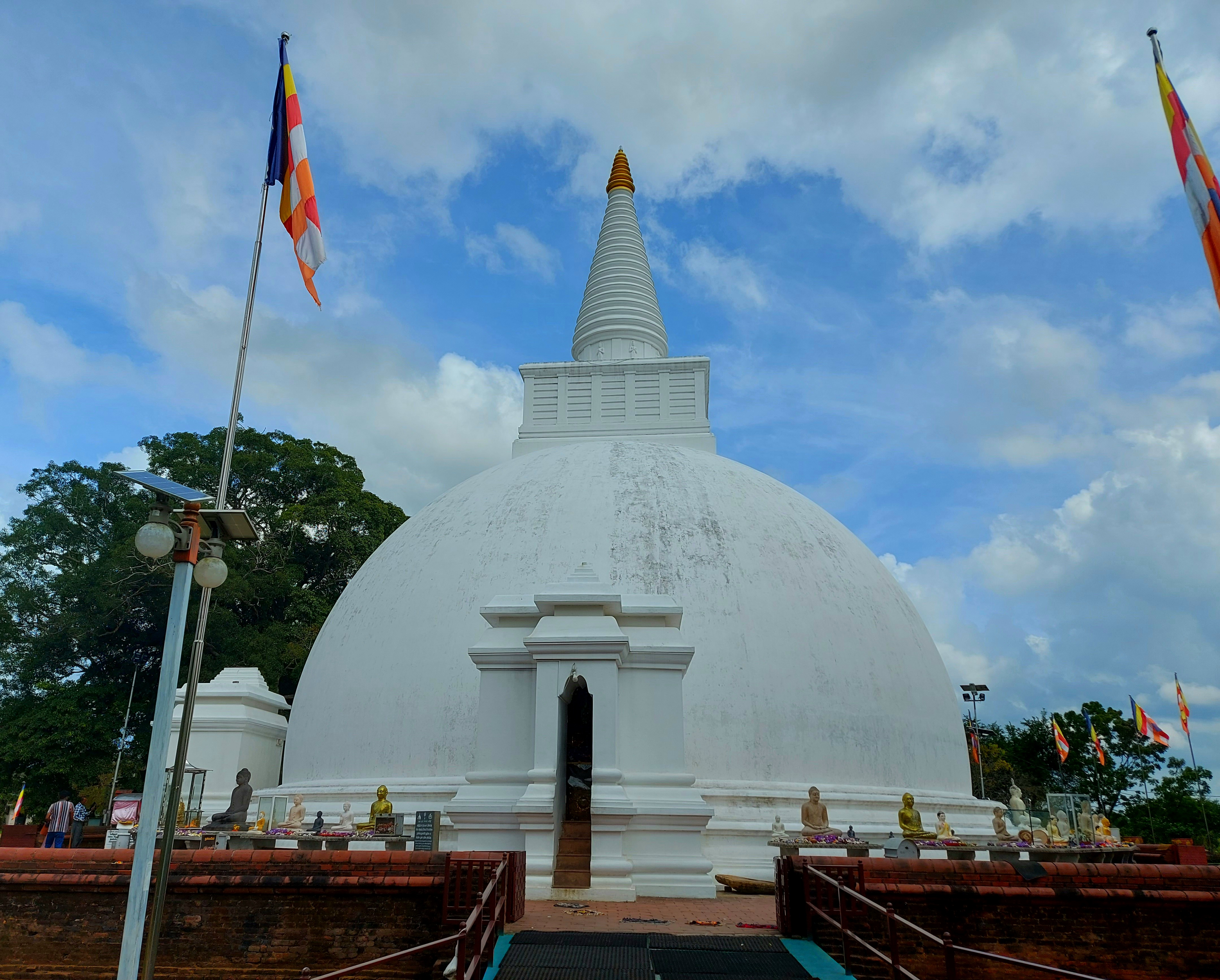

- Location within Sri Lanka

Religion
- Affiliation: Buddhism
- District: Polonnaruwa
- Province: North Central Province

Location
- Location: Somawathiya National Park, Polonnaruwa District, Sri Lanka
- Coordinates: 08°07′15.16″N 81°10′07.9″E

Architecture
- Type: Ancient Buddhist Temple-Late Anuradhapura Period
- Founder: Prince Nakula (Period of King Mahadatikha Mahanaga)
- Completed: 10 Century A.D
- Archaeological Protected Monument of Sri Lanka

The Somawathiya Chaitya or Somawathiya Vihara(Sinhala: සෝමාවතිය චෛත්‍ය, Tamil: சோமாவதி சைத்தியம்) is a Buddhist temple located in the Polonnaruwa region of Sri Lanka. It is situated near the boundary between the Polonnaruwa District and the Trincomalee District.

Until 2020, the temple was generally regarded as the Somawathiya Vihara described in the Dhātuvamsa, where the right Tooth Relic of the Buddha was believed to have been enshrined. However, this identification was reconsidered following archaeological excavations carried out at the Seruwila Wilgamwehera Raja Maha Vihara stupa between 2015 and 2020.

According to inscriptions found at the Eric Swan Rock, the monastery at the present site was known as Prāchīna Nāgārāma and was founded by Prince Nakula during the reign of King Mahadatika Mahanaga. Consequently, some archaeological and historical interpretations have questioned the traditional identification of the site as the historical Somawathiya Vihara and have suggested that the present monument may instead be the Prāchīna Nāgārāma referred to in the inscriptions.

== Inscriptions ==
Several ancient inscriptions have been discovered in and around the archaeological site traditionally known as Somawathiya. Two inscriptions are located near the stupa, while several others have been found on a large rock outcrop at Minvila, near the site, commonly referred to as the Eric Swan Rock.

The inscriptions constitute important epigraphical evidence for the history and identification of the religious establishment. They contain references to ancient monasteries, grants of villages and land, irrigation works and the allocation of revenue for the maintenance of religious institutions.

=== Somawathiya Stupa slab inscription of Mahadatika Mahanaga ===
A slab inscription discovered from the terrace of the Somawathiya Stupa records the foundation of a monastery named Pajina-Naka-Araba, identified with Pācīna Nāgārāma, by Prince Nakula, a son of King Mahadatika Mahanaga. This inscription has played an important role in scholarly discussions concerning the historical identity of the site.

=== Minvila inscriptions ===
A number of inscriptions have been recorded on the Minvila rock near the stupa. These inscriptions contain information concerning irrigation works, grants made to religious establishments and the administration of monastic property.

One inscription records a canal associated with King Gamani Abhaya. Another records a grant made by King Mahadatika Mahanaga to a religious establishment founded by his son Nakula.

Another inscription records a donation made by a ruler identified as Gamani Abhaya, while an inscription attributed to King Kanittha Tissa records the establishment of a monastic grove and provisions made for its maintenance.

The longest inscription on the Minvila rock contains information corresponding to that recorded in an inscription of King Kanittha Tissa found near the Somawathiya Stupa.

=== Somawathiya Stupa slab inscription of Kanittha Tissa ===
An inscription of King Kanittha Tissa was discovered near the Somawathiya Stupa in 1954. It records the establishment of a sacred grove and grants made for its maintenance.

According to the historical topography compiled by C. W. Nicholas, an inscription associated with the site records the foundation of a monastery named Pajini-Nakala-araba-vihara by Prince Nakala, while a later inscription of Kanittha Tissa refers to the stupa as Mani-agaya-cetiya.

Together, these inscriptions provide important evidence concerning royal patronage, land and village grants, irrigation works and the economic administration of Buddhist religious establishments in the region.

== Archaeological and historical interpretations ==
The stupa presently known as Somawathiya, located in the Sungawila area of the Polonnaruwa District, is traditionally regarded by many Buddhists as the historical Somawathiya Stupa in which the right Tooth Relic of the Buddha was enshrined. However, the identification of the present monument with the Somawathiya described in the Dhātuvamsa has been questioned by several scholars on archaeological and historical grounds.

=== Interpretations based on inscriptions ===
The Sri Lankan archaeologist C. W. Nicholas expressed significant doubts regarding the traditional identification of the site. He noted that an inscription found at the site records the foundation of a monastery named Pajini-Nakala-araba-vihara by Prince Nakala, while a later inscription of King Kanittha Tissa refers to the stupa as Mani-agaya-cetiya. On the basis of these inscriptions, Nicholas concluded that the present name "Somawathiya" and the associated traditions did not have a historical basis.

Professor Senarath Paranavithana likewise questioned the traditional belief that the present Somawathiya Stupa was the monument constructed during the second century BC for the enshrinement of the right Tooth Relic. He argued that the inscription discovered on the pavement of the stupa establishes the foundation of a religious establishment centred on the monument, but does not support its identification with a stupa traditionally attributed to the time of Kavantissa. Paranavithana also noted that the Dhātuvamsa account upon which the traditional identification is based concerns a stupa situated in Rohana, whereas the monument now known as Somawathiya is located in the Rajarata region.

The archaeological researcher Ellawala Medhananda also argued that the stupa presently known as Somawathiya was not the Somawathiya described in the Dhātuvamsa. Referring to inscriptions discovered at the site and at the nearby Minvila rock, he noted that the religious establishment was referred to as Pācīna Nāgārāma and that another inscription mentioned Mani-agaya Raja Maha Vihara. He further argued that the earliest inscription associated with the site dates to the reign of King Mahadatika Mahanaga and records the foundation of the monastery by Prince Nakula. According to Medhananda, there was insufficient historical evidence to explain how the original name of a monastery allegedly founded by Queen Soma could have disappeared within a relatively short period.

=== Alternative identification at Wilgam Vehera ===
An alternative interpretation emerged following archaeological investigations at the site now known as Wilgam Vehera in the Seruwila–Toppur area. During a media briefing held in 2020, representatives of the Department of Archaeology and the Central Cultural Fund stated that archaeological investigations at the site had produced evidence suggesting that the stupa under excavation could be associated with the historical Somawathiya Stupa.

Senior Professor M. W. Wimal Wijeyeratne has also proposed an identification of the Wilgam Vehera stupa with the historical Somawathiya mentioned in the Dhātuvamsa. His research draws upon accounts contained in the Dhātuvamsa and other historical traditions associated with the Seruwila region. Wijeyeratne has published studies dealing with the historical identification of Somapura and Somawathiya and their relationship to the relic traditions of the region.

Archaeological excavations conducted at Wilgam Vehera between 2015 and 2020, together with comparisons between the site and descriptions found in the Pali Dhātuvamsa, the Sinhala Dhātuvamsa and the Jinakālamālī, have contributed to scholarly discussion concerning the possible identification of the monument. During discussions concerning the archaeological investigations in 2020, archaeologists associated with the Department of Archaeology and the Central Cultural Fund indicated that the stupa under excavation might represent the historical Somawathiya associated with the ancient settlement of Somapura.

These interpretations have contributed to renewed scholarly debate concerning the historical identity of the monument traditionally known as Somawathiya. In particular, the inscriptions referring to Pācīna Nāgārāma and Mani-agaya-cetiya have been regarded as important evidence in discussions concerning the original identity of the religious establishment. Nevertheless, the name "Somawathiya" continues to be widely used for the present temple and stupa in religious and popular contexts.

== Gallery ==
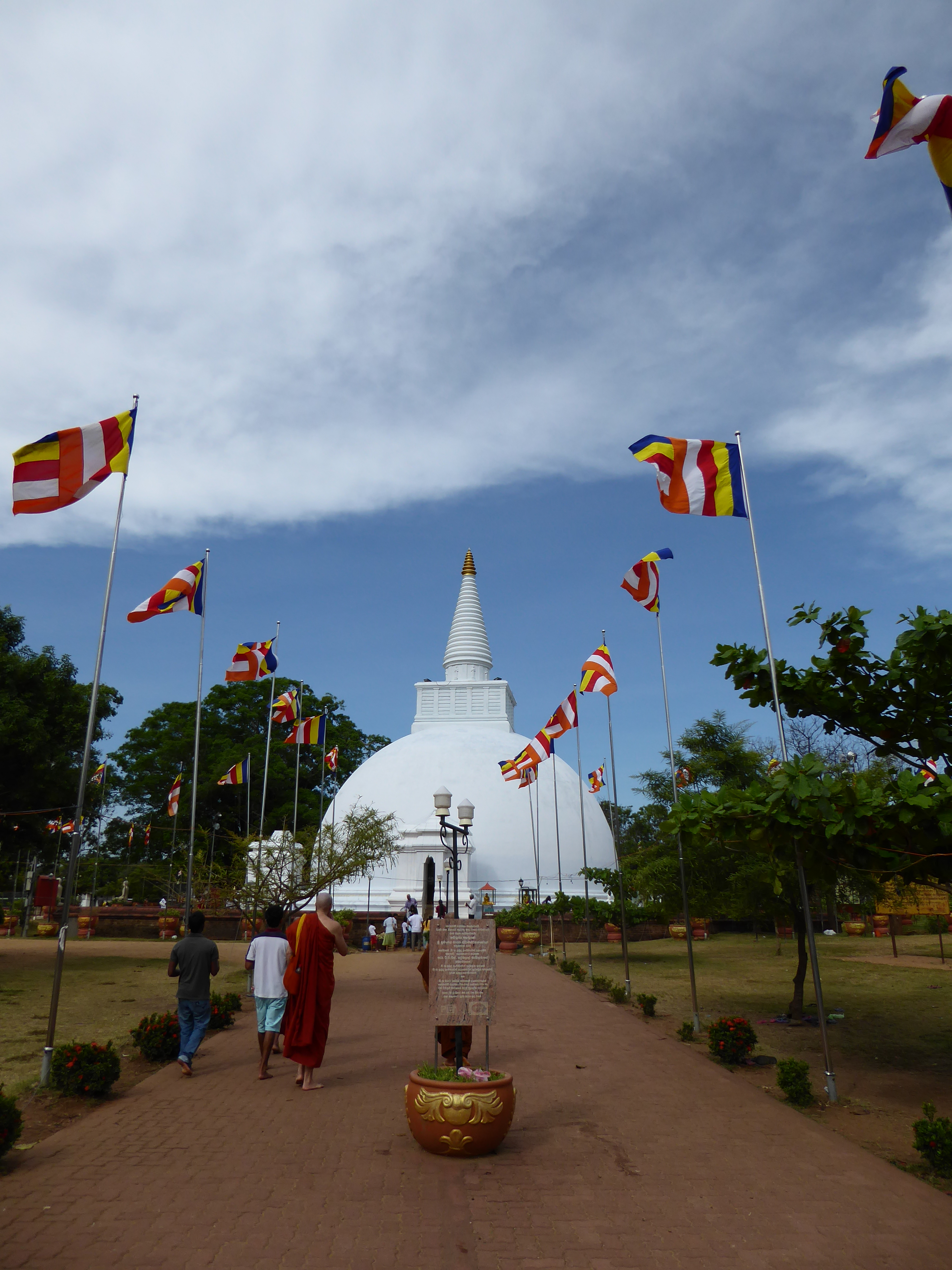
Approach Road

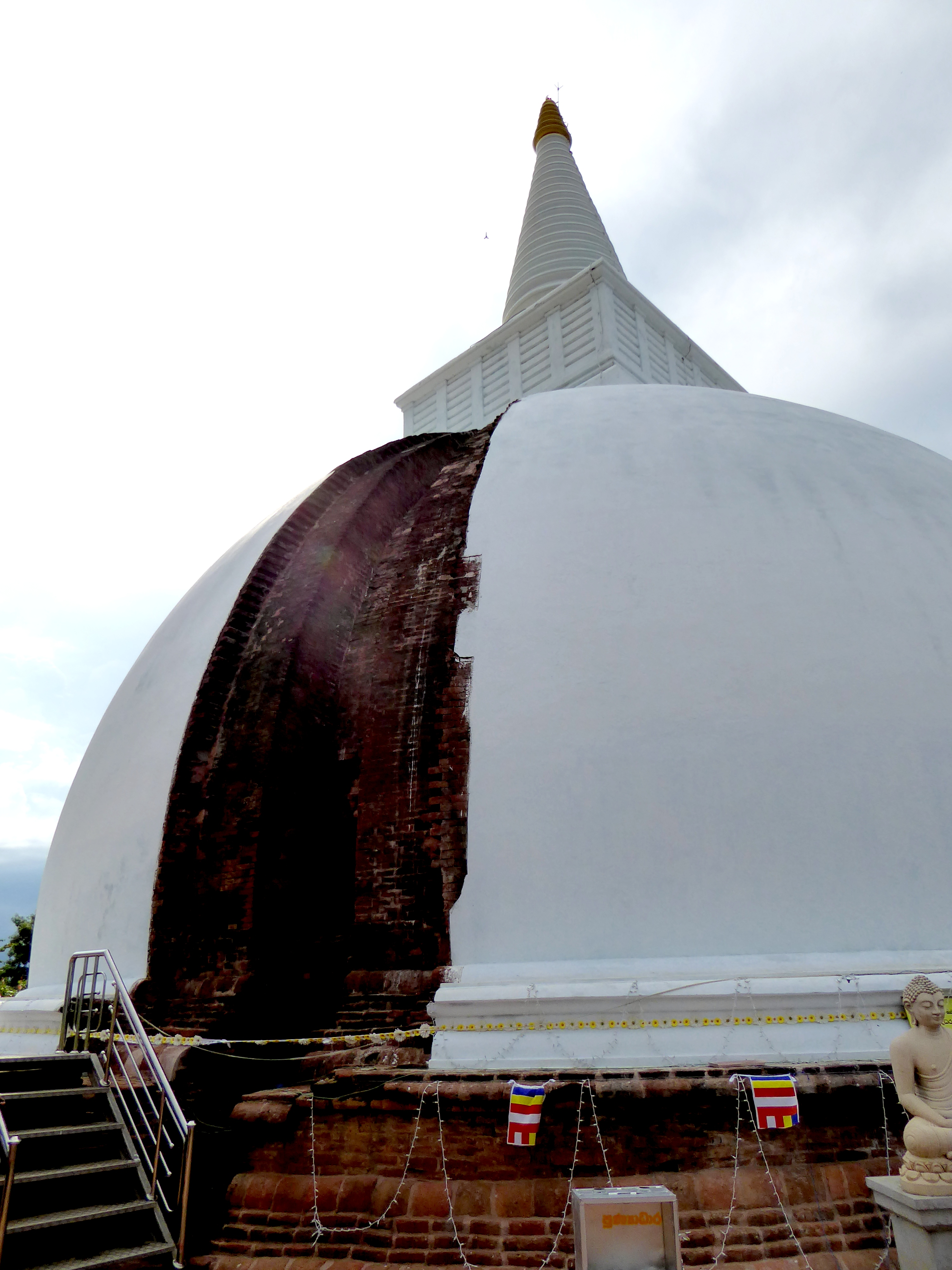
The interior of the Stupa

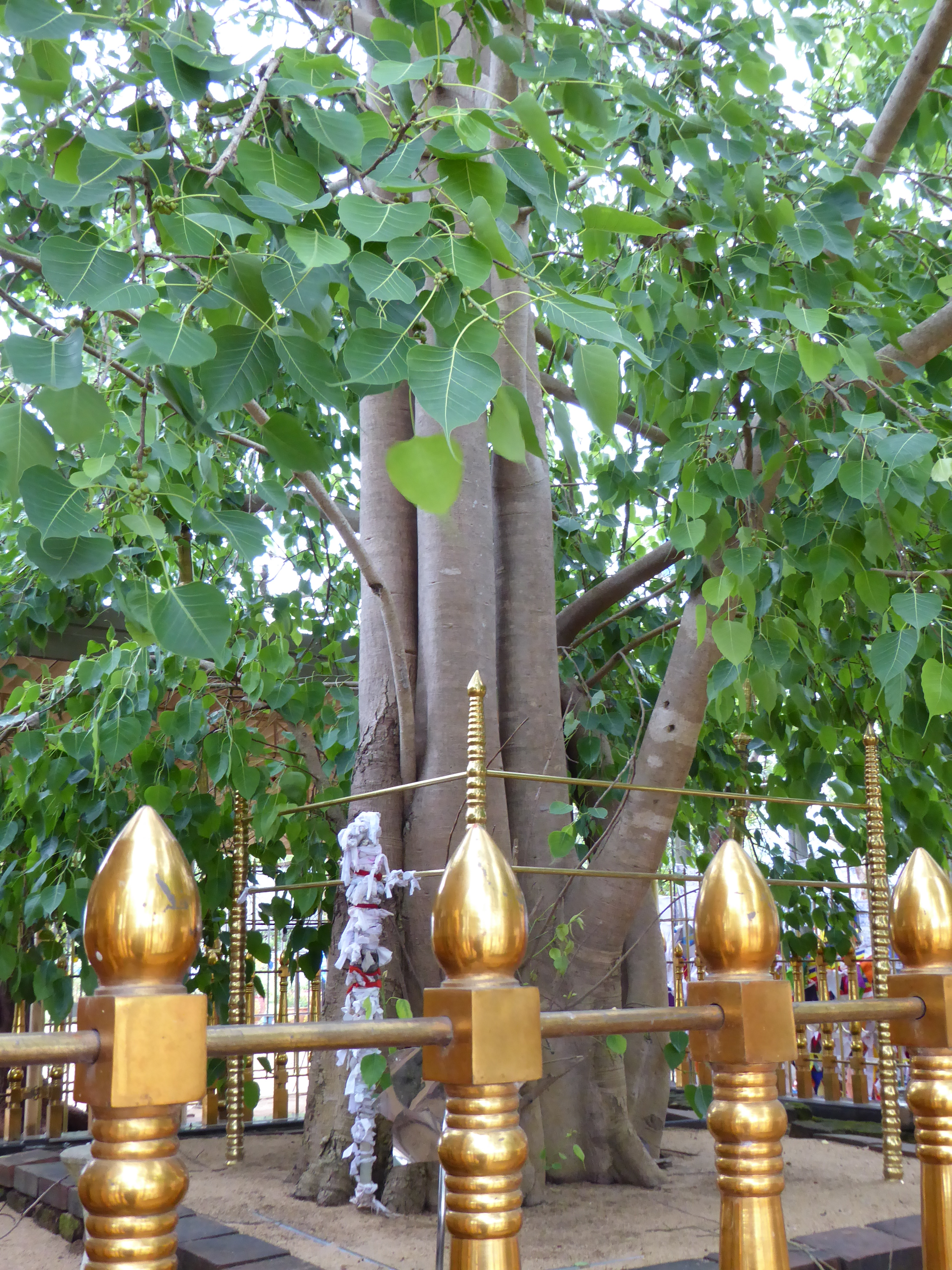
Bodhi Tree at Somawathiya

== See also ==
- Ancient Constructions of Sri Lanka
- Atamasthana
- Buddhism
- Mahawamsa

== Other reading ==
- "Over half a million attended to pooja Somawathiya pilgrims marooned by floods". Island. 2010-05-10.
- "Sharp increase in income from national parks". Dailynews. 2012-12-29.
- "Govt adopting only populist policies for people's welfare - President". priu.gov.lk. June 12, 2014.
- "Across the river the elephants came!". Sunday Times. 6 October 2015.
