= Medirigiriya Vatadage =

Buddhist structure in Sri Lanka

- මැදිරිගිරිය වටදාගෙය
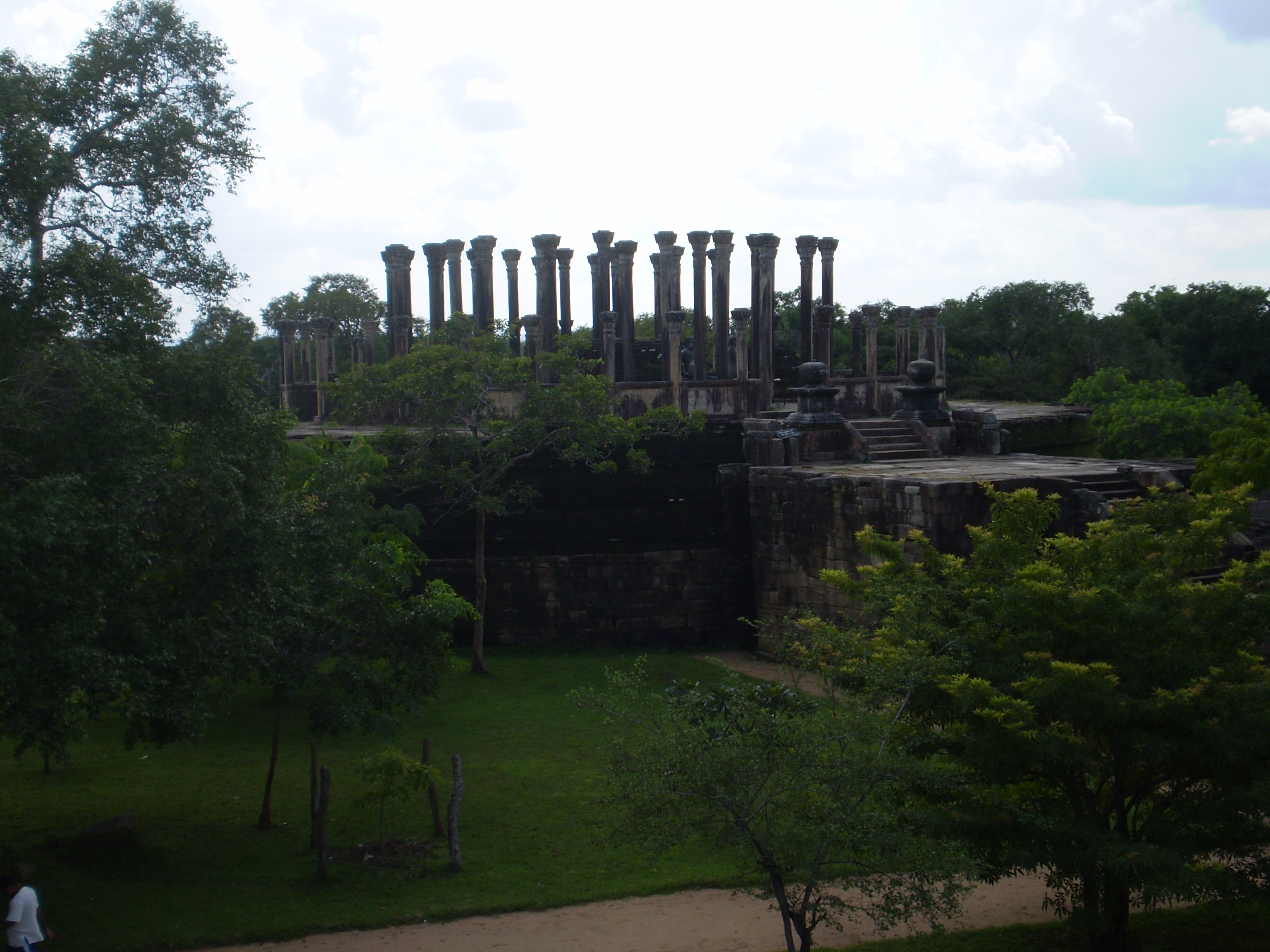

- The location of Medirigiriya Vatadage in Sri Lanka

Location
- Interactive map of Medirigiriya Vatadage
- Coordinates: 8°9′22″N 80°59′45″E

Medirigiriya Vatadageya (Sinhala: මැදිරිගිරිය වටදාගෙය) is a Buddhist structure (Vatadage) in Medirigiriya, Sri Lanka. The structure has been formally recognised by the Government as an Archaeological Protected Monument.

== History ==
Constructed during the Anuradhapura era, this is believed to be the ancient Mandalagiraka Vihara to which King Kanittha Tissa added an Uposathaghara (a chapter house).

== 3D documentation ==
The site was documented in 3D in 2019 by the Zamani Project.

== See also ==
- Polonnaruwa Vatadage
- Vatadage
