= Giritale Tank =

Giritale tank
- Giritale wewa
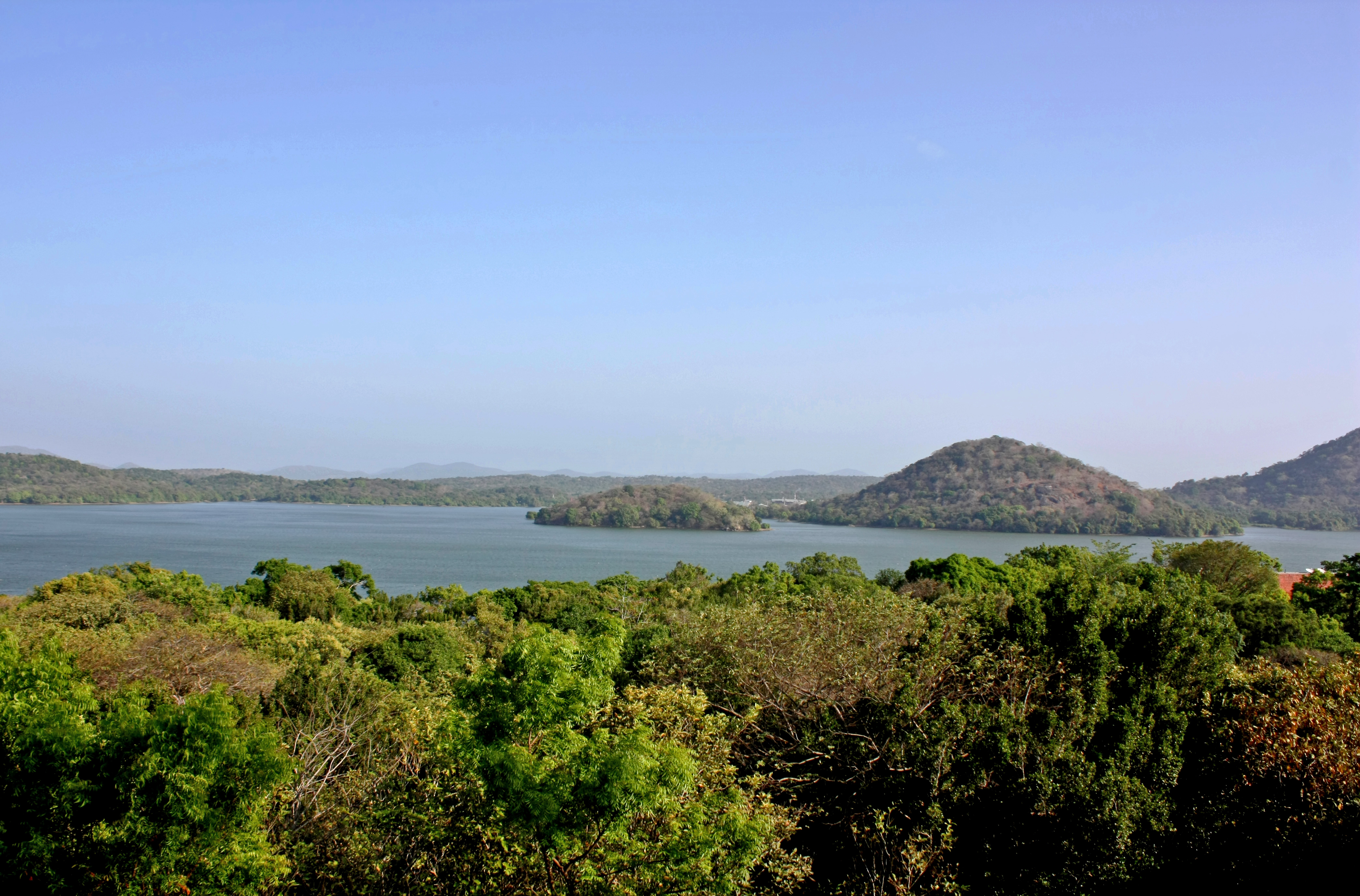
- Giritale tank

- Location within Sri Lanka
- Location: Giritale, Polonnaruwa
- Coordinates: 7.991°N 80.914°E
- Type: reservoir
- Catchment area: 24 km^{2} (9.3 sq mi)
- Basin countries: Sri Lanka
- Built: 608-618
- Max. length: 550 m (1,800 ft)
- Max. depth: 23 m (75 ft)
- Water volume: 24×10^{6} m^{3} (19,000 acre⋅ft)
- Islands: Several
- Settlements: Giritale and Minneriya

The Giritale tank (Sinhala: ගිරිතලේ වැව) is a reservoir in Giritale and Minneriya in Sri Lanka. It was built by King Agbo II (608-618). It is believed that the tank was renovated by King Parakramabahu, the Great (1153–1186). Later, it was subjected to renovation in 1905, 1942 and 1952 during colonial era.

Giritale Tank was considered as the deepest tank in Sri Lanka during the rule of medieval capital Polonnaruwa.
