= Dimbulagala Raja Maha Vihara =

Dimbulagala Forest Monastery
- දිඹුලාගල ආරණ්‍ය සේනාසනය
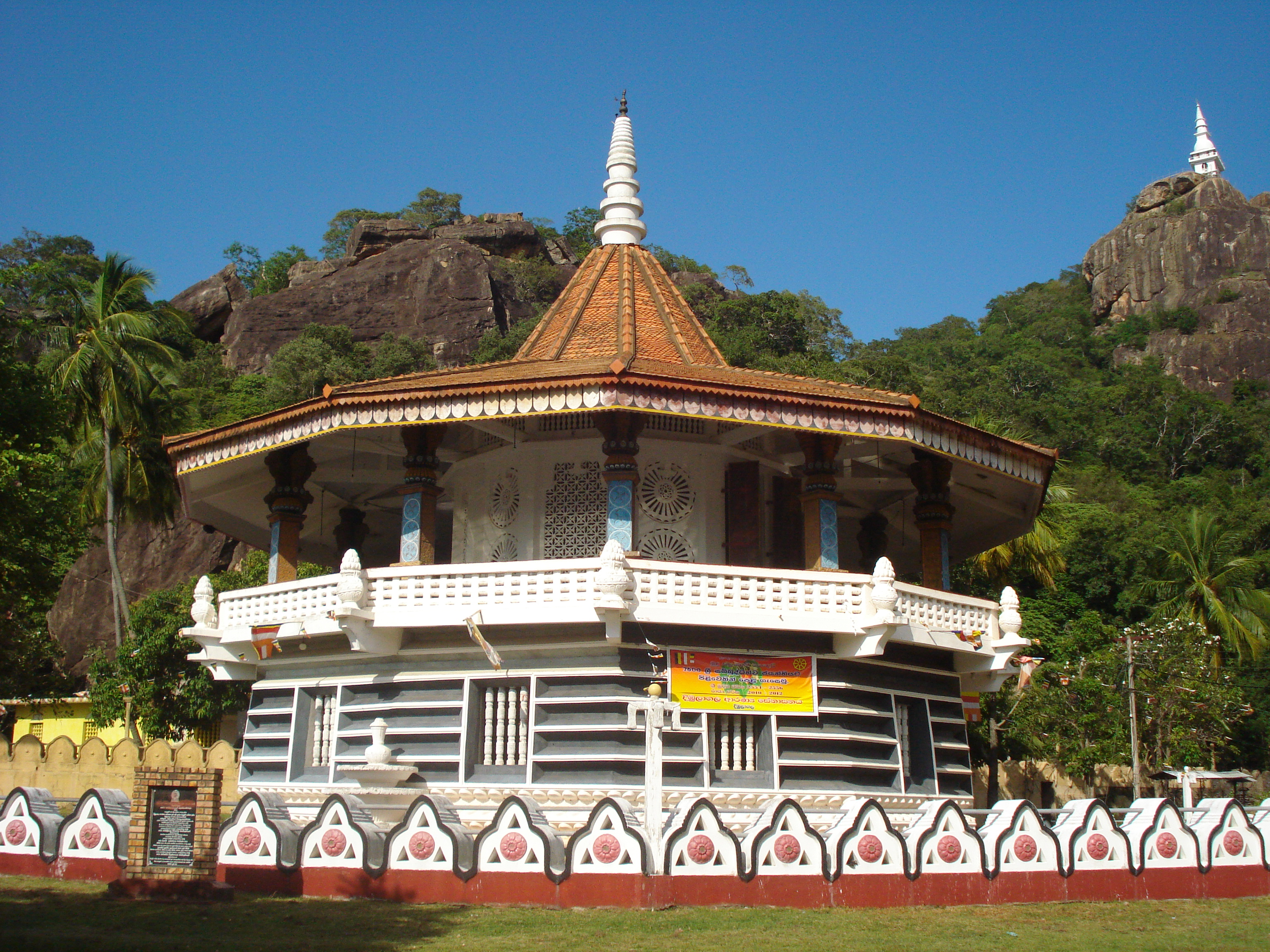

- Location within Sri Lanka

Religion
- Affiliation: Buddhism
- District: Polonnaruwa
- Province: North Central Province

Location
- Location: Dimbulagala, Sri Lanka
- Coordinates: 7.861885°N 81.121854°E

Architecture
- Type: Buddhist Temple

Dimbulagala Raja Maha Vihara is situated 16 kilometres south east of the ancient city of Polonnaruwa, Sri Lanka. The Dimbulagala range houses a number of caves cut into the rock with Brahmi inscriptions over their drip ledges. This forest hermitage of medieval times and holy abode since time immemorial, home to some of the most valued fragments of early frescoes was called the Gunners Quoin by the British. This Buddhist monastery which was abandoned after the times of the Kingdom of Polonnaruwa was restored to the present status in the 1950s due to the efforts of Kithalagama Sri Seelalankara Thera, who was the chief incumbent of the Vihara until his death in 1995.

== Pulligoda ==
=== The frescoes ===
The frescoes at Pulligoda were reported by Bell in 1897, a series of fragmentary remains of old paintings in a shallow cave shrine. Today a fragment of what once may have been a larger scene of devotees in the attitude of veneration, consisting of five male figures seated on lotus cushions placed on a broad seat. The dating of these frescoes are subject to debate. Coomaraswamy and Vincent Smith dated the paintings to the 8th century. Paranavithana ascribed them to a period earlier than the 12th century but with a likelihood of being contemporary with the Polonnaruwa paintings (12th century). Raja de Silva referring to the material technology of Pulligoda being common to paintings of the earlier Anuradhapura period dates them to as early as the 4th century. Dr. Raja de Silva, (former Archaeological Commissioner of Sri Lanka) in a study of early period paintings from 247 BC to 800 AD defines several of the characteristics and elements of the Pulligoda galge frescoes. He describes that the male figures depicted here have reached a stage of attainment (sovan, sakrudagami, anagami or arhat) as signified by the oval aura shaded red behind each head. The saintly figures are all seated with their legs crossed. The soles are painted red with cosmetics, like the palms. The lower garments are pantaloons of plain red or stripes reaching down to the ankle. Their headdresses vary distinguishing two figures as Brahmins. Another wears a white band of sacred thread across the bare upper body marking a sage. Ear rings, necklaces armlets, bracelets are also worn. One figure is green in complexion. The asana (seats) on which the lotus cushions are placed is ornamented. Only a small fragment was all that remained to be admired, it radiated a state of spirituality, serenity and peace that these forest hermits would have enjoyed. It speaks of elegance, refinement, poise and beauty. One figure held a lotus bud by the stalk while the left arm was folded across the chest in a charming gesture of offering. The others seem to hold their palms together gracefully. The pigments of earthy red, ochre, yellow and green stood on a background of white with small circular designs. The frescoes even after many years still remain vibrant. Dr. de Silva says that the characteristics of drawing, shading, perspective and stylistic methods of outlining features at Pulligoda bring to mind the paintings in Sigiriya implying that the artists at both sites were of the same conservative school of temple painting. Further up is an interesting rock cave naturally resembling the formation of a house with a slab roof.

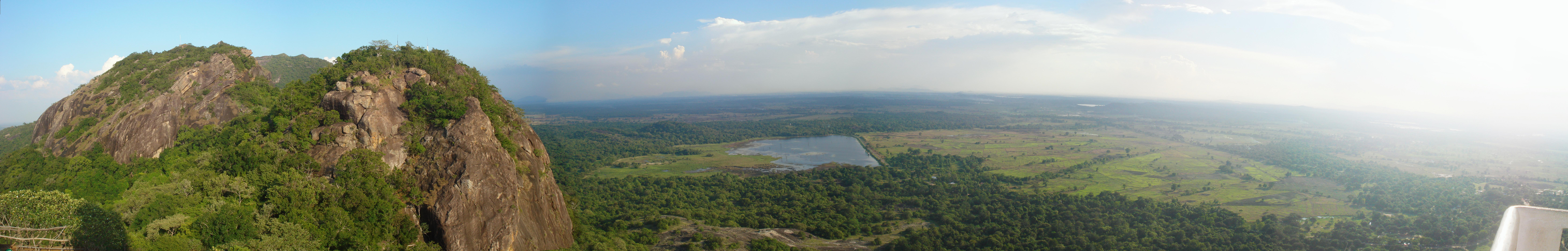
A panoramic photo over the Dimbulagala peak from "Sath Mahal Prasadaya" which is located inside the Dimbulagala Raja Maha Vihara.

== Namal Pokuna, rock pools ==
The Namal Pokuna complex, also in the vicinity and lies 2 kilometres before the Dimbulagala temple. There is also a small temple inhabited by monks at the bottom of this ancient forest hermitage. The way to the ruins is uphill along a scorching rocky-face passing strange crevices and little rock pools. The ruins of a monastery including a Chaithiya, bodhigara, poyage, dhamma saba mandapaya, ancient guard stones and moon stones are evident. The ruins are enclosed by a stone parapet with four cardinal entrances, immediately outside was a pokuna (bath) and a stone bridge. The jungle path leading further up leads to the Akasa Chaithiya on the summit of Dimbulagala, passing ancient caves of the forest hermitage. One such imposing rock formation allowed the wattle and daub walls to be built dividing the cave into many rooms including a little verandah as well. Further up are the curative waters of the famed Namal Pokuna, and the maravidiya caves.

== King Pandukabhaya ==
It is said that Pandukabhaya of Anuradhapura lived here for a short period in the 4th century. In the Anuradhapura period there was an important vihara here. An inscription of Sundaramaha devi in the 12th century says that 500 monks resided there at that time.

== King Parakramabahu II ==
A most notable period of its history is associated with King Parakramabahu I, in the 12th century where the Dimbulagala Maha Kassapa Thera helped the King with the purification and renewal of the Buddhist order. In the early centuries Dimbulagala was known as Dhumarakkhapabbata or Udumbarapabbata.

== See also ==
- Dambulla cave temple
