= Siripura =

Siripura is a rural village situated in Polonnaruwa District of Sri Lanka. It contains a temple, the Sri Meththaramaya, and a school, the Siripura central college.
