= Ajri Demirovski =

Macedonian musical artist (1927–2009)

Ajri Demirovski (Macedonian: Ајри Демировски, Turkish: Hayri Önder; 1 January 1927 in Bitola, Kingdom of Serbs, Croats and Slovenes – 22 October 2009 in Karşıyaka, Turkey), was an ethnic Turkish singer from Yugoslavia.

== Early life and career ==
Demirovski was born to a poor family and started working in a barber shop when he was young. After his graduation, Ajri worked in the Zagreb printing houses of "Kermpuh" and "Rojamkovski". He also worked in Pula, Rijeka and Skopje before returning to his native town of Bitola in 1949. Ajri was not hired at the printing house in Bitola, "Kiro Dandaro" and so became a security guard at the newly established "Radio Bitola" radio station.

The opportunity to work alongside some of the greatest Macedonian singers and songwriters inspired Ajri to create his own Macedonian folk songs. It is believed that Ajri created over 80 folk songs in Macedonian. Despite the fact that Ajri was an ethnic Turk, none of his songs were written in Turkish.

During his time at Radio Bitola, Ajri produced his most famous song to date "Bitola moj roden kraj" (Bitola, my birthplace).

Due to mass emigration in 1955, Ajri Demirovski moved to Turkey to spend the next 50 years of his life there. He worked in publishing and printing, making music in his free time. In 2000, Ajri returned to Bitola to be awarded the first ever honorary citizenship of Bitola for his contribution to Macedonian music and folklore, and also the bond created between Macedonian and Turkish culture. At the same time, his song "Bitola Moj Roden Kraj" was voted as song of the century by the citizens of Bitola.

Ajri Demirovski died on 22 October 2009, at his home in the district of İzmir, Karşıyaka. Other than Turkish and Macedonian, he spoke Serbian, Bulgarian and Italian. Ajri was father of three children.
