= Medirigiriya =

Medirigiriya මැදිරිගිරිය
- Town
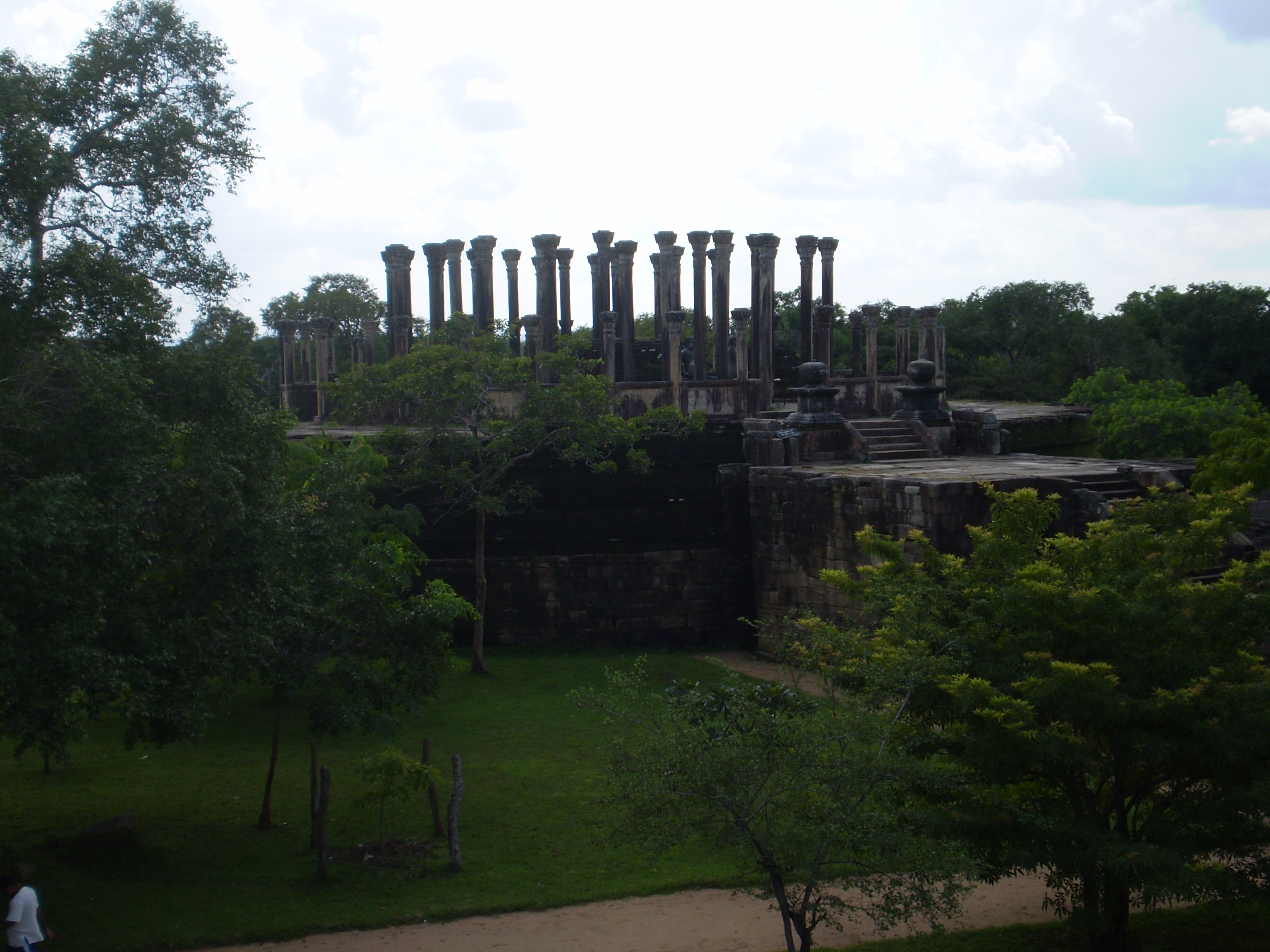
- Medirigiriya Vatadage
- Location in Sri Lanka
- Coordinates: 8°09′02″N 80°58′44″E
- Country: Sri Lanka
- Province: North Central Province
- District: Polonnaruwa District
- Elevation: 61 m (200 ft)
- Time zone: UTC+5:30 (Time in Sri Lanka)
- Postal code: 51500
- Area code: 027

Medirigiriya (Sinhala: මැදිරිගිරිය) is a town located in Polonnaruwa District in North Central Province, Sri Lanka. The elevation of the town is 61 m (200 ft). The famous archaeological site of Medirigiriya Vatadage is located about 1 km (0.62 mi) from the town centre.

== 3D Heritage Documentation ==
The Zamani Project, document cultural heritage sites in 3D to create a record for future generations. The documentation is based on terrestrial laser-scanning. The 3D documentation of Medirigiriya Watadageya was carried out in 2019. 3D models, a Panorama tour, plans and images can be view here.

== See also ==
- Medirigiriya Vatadage
- Medirigiriya National School
- Medirigiriya Divisional Secretariat
- Medirigiriya Electoral District
