= Welikanda =

Town in North Central Province, Sri Lanka

Coordinates: 7.950°N 81.247°E

Welikanda is a town situated in Polonnaruwa District in North Central Province, Sri Lanka.

Welikanda Divisional Secretariat is a Divisional Secretariat of Polonnaruwa District.
