= Medirigiriya Divisional Secretariat =

- Divisional Secretariat
- Interactive map of Medirigiriya Divisional Secretariat
- Country: Sri Lanka
- Province: North Central Province
- District: Polonnaruwa District
- Time zone: UTC+5:30 (Sri Lanka Standard Time)

Medirigiriya Divisional Secretariat is a Divisional Secretariat of Polonnaruwa District, of North Central Province, Sri Lanka.

== Demography-Religion ==
Religion in Medirigiriya DS Division (2012)
1. Buddhist (97.7%)
2. Hindu (0.00%)
3. Muslim (1.80%)
4. Roman Catholic (0.30%)
5. Other Christian (0.20%)
6. Other (0.00%)
