= Giritale =

- Town
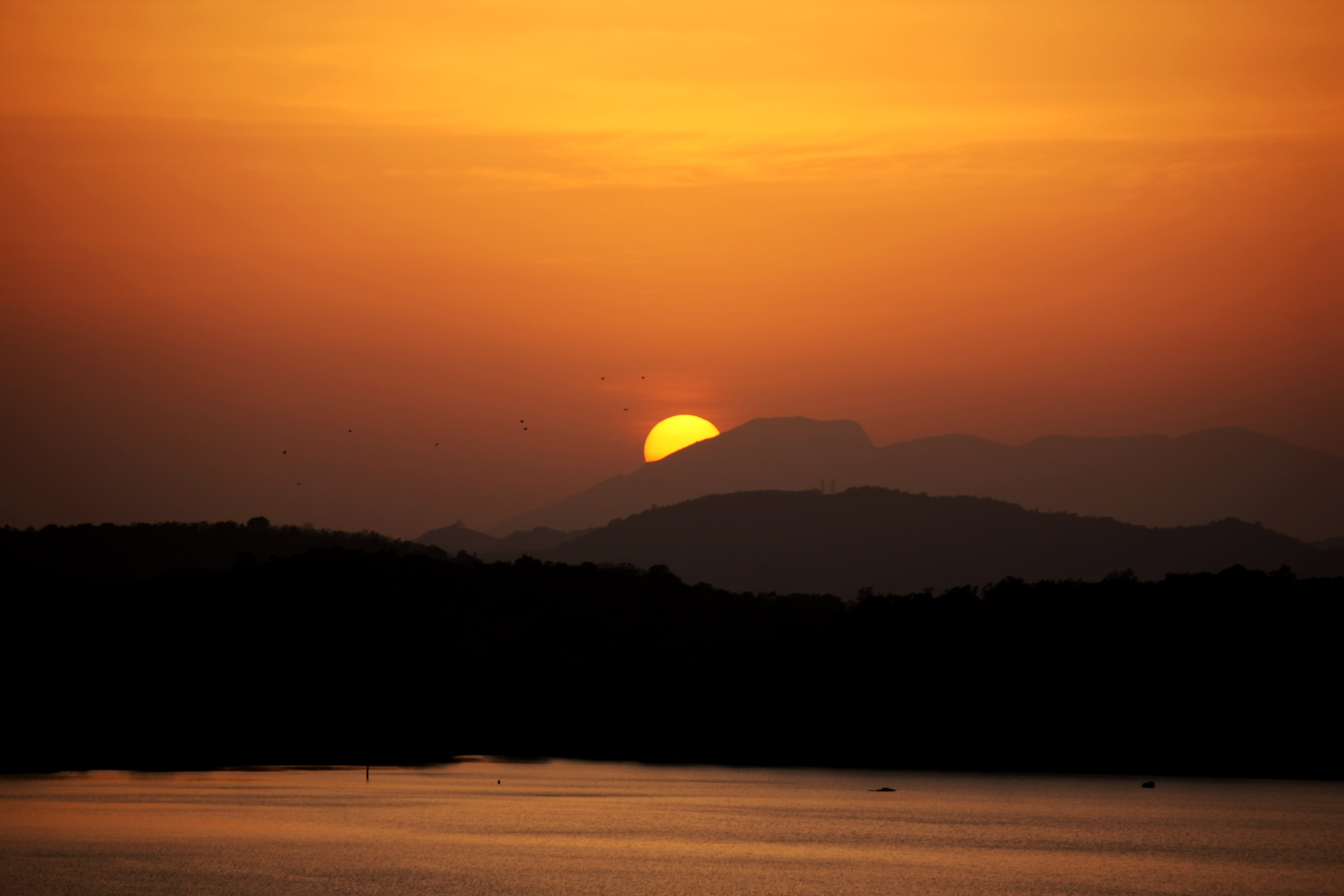
- Sunset over Giritale Wewa and mountains

- Location in Sri Lanka
- Coordinates: 7°59′N 80°55′E
- Country: Sri Lanka
- Province: North Central Province
- District: Polonnaruwa
- Time zone: UTC+5:30 (Sri Lanka Standard Time Zone)

Giritale is a small city in the Polonnaruwa District of Sri Lanka. The location has tourist attraction due its nature and close link with Polonnaruwa, an ancient capital of Sri Lanka. Giritale has some mid-range and up hotels. It is situated on the main road from Colombo to Polonnaruwa and Batticaloa.

Giritale tank (Giritale Wewa) has a historical background that associates with King Aggabodhi II (608-618 A.D.) and other stories. Giritale shares a sanctuary with Minneriya, and it is known as Giritale-Minneriya sanctuary.
