= Polonnaruwa District =

Polonnaruwa District පොළොන්නරුව දිස්ත්‍රික්කය பொலன்னறுவை மாவட்டம்
- Administrative District
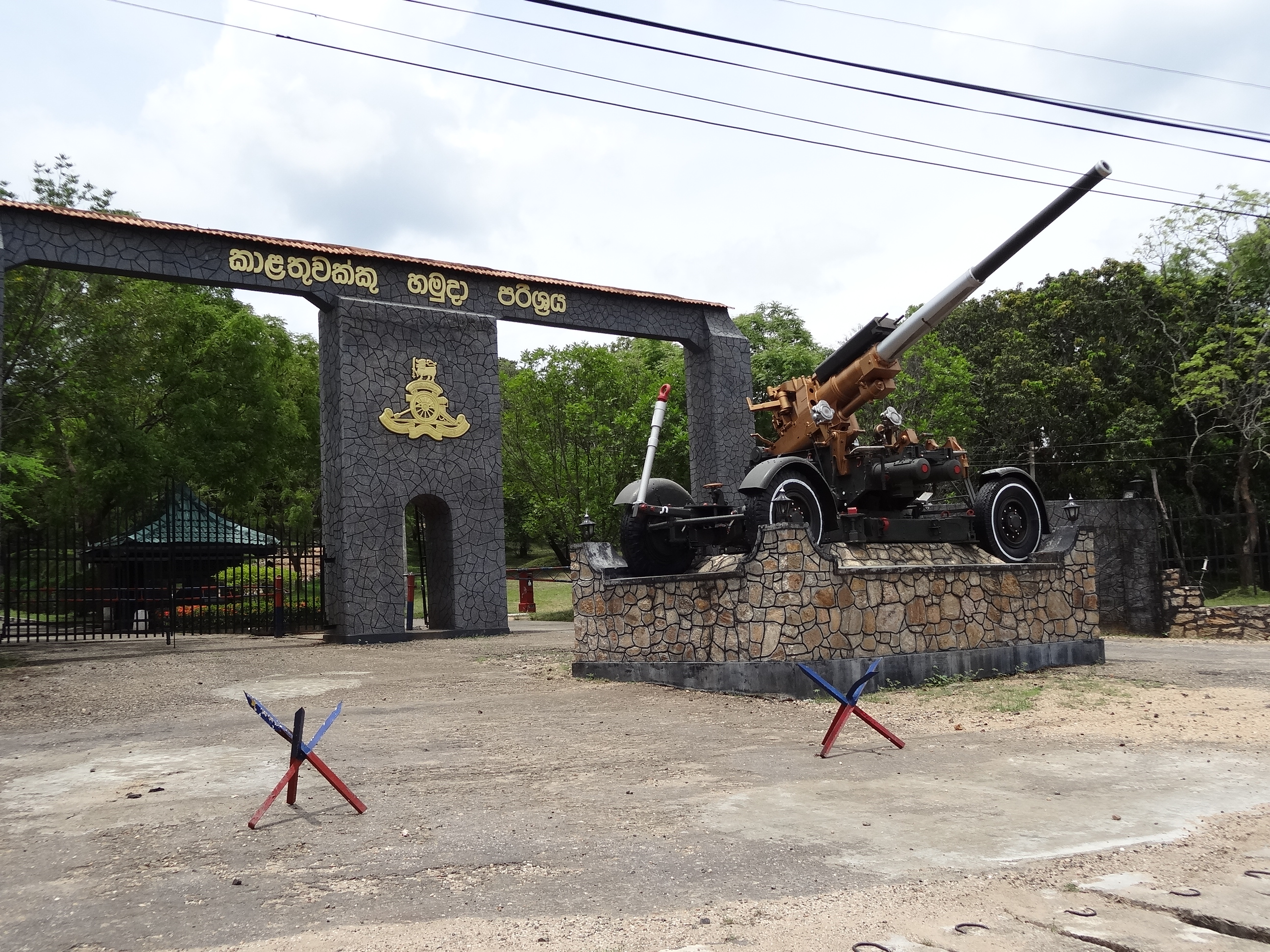
- Polonnaruwa aerial photograph Nephrology Hospital PCC Lankatilaka Temple Dimbulagala Raja Maha Vihara Artillery Complex Minneriya Manampitiya Bridge

- Map of Sri Lanka with Polonnaruwa District highlighted
- Coordinates: 8°00′N 81°00′E
- Country: Sri Lanka
- Province: North Central Province
- Largest Town: Polonnaruwa
- DS Division: List: Dimbulagala; Elahera; Hingurakgoda; Lankapura; Medirigiriya; Thamankaduwa; Welikanda

Government
  - District Secretary: Sujantha Ekanayake
  - MPs: List: Maithripala Sirisena; Roshan Ranasinghe; Siripala Gamalath; Amarakeerthi Athukorala; Kins Nelson
  - MPCs: List: Peshala Jayarathne; H.B. Semasinghe; K.H. Nandasena; R.M.P.B. Rathnayake; S.M. Ranjith

Area
  - Total: 3,293 km^{2} (1,271 sq mi)
  - Land: 3,077 km^{2} (1,188 sq mi)
  - Water: 216 km^{2} (83 sq mi) 6.55%
  - Rank: 5th (5.01% of total area)

Population (2024)
  - Total: 447,530
  - Density: 145.4/km^{2} (376.7/sq mi)

Ethnicity
  - Sinhalese: 365,476 (90.6%)
  - Moors: 29,060 (7.2%)
  - Sri Lankan Tamil: 7,356 (1.8%)
  - Indian Tamil: 1,190 (0.3%)
  - Other: 253 (0.06%)

Religion
  - Buddhist: 361,920 (89.7%)
  - Muslim: 30,427 (7.5%)
  - Hindu: 6,835 (1.7%)
  - Christian: 4,090 (1.00%)
  - Other: 63 (0.01%)
- Time zone: UTC+05:30 (Sri Lanka)
- Post Codes: 51000
- Telephone Codes: 027
- ISO 3166 code: LK-72
- Vehicle registration: NC
- Official Languages: Sinhala, Tamil

Polonnaruwa District (Sinhala: පොළොන්නරුව දිස්ත්‍රික්කය; Tamil: பொலன்னறுவை மாவட்டம்) is one of the 25 districts of Sri Lanka, the second level administrative division of the country. It is also one of the two districts of North Central Province and has an area of 3,293 km^{2}.

The district is administered by a District Secretariat headed by a District Secretary (previously known as a Government Agent) appointed by the central government of Sri Lanka. The capital of the district is the city of Polonnaruwa.

== History ==
Polonnaruwa has a long history as an important settlement in Sri Lanka's North Central region. It became the island's main political centre after the Chola conquest of Anuradhapura in the late 10th century. Following the Chola period, King Vijayabahu I restored Sinhalese rule in the 11th century, and Polonnaruwa later reached its height under King Parakramabahu I in the 12th century. The city subsequently declined following invasions and the relocation of the kingdom's political centre.

Today, Polonnaruwa is known for its archaeological heritage and its role as an administrative and commercial centre in the district. The modern town developed alongside the historic city, with Kaduruwela serving as an important center for contemporary urban activities.

== Geography ==
=== Location and boundaries ===
Polonnaruwa District is situated in the North Central Province of Sri Lanka. It covers an area of approximately 3,293 km², of which about 3,077 km² is land and 216 km² is inland water. The district extends between latitudes 7°40′ and 8°21′ north and longitudes 80°44′ and 81°20′ east, with its approximate center at 8°00′N 81°00′E.

Polonnaruwa

Climate chart (precipitation, max. and min. temperature)
J	F	M	A	M	J	J	A	S	O	N	D
114 22 28	75 22 29	54 23 32	92 24 33	64 26 34	18 26 34	25 26 34	34 26 34	53 25 34	182 24 32	238 23 29	207 22 28
- █ Average max. and min. temperatures in °C
- █ Precipitation totals in mm
Imperial conversion
J	F	M	A	M	J	J	A	S	O	N	D
4.5 71 82	3 71 84	2.1 73 89	3.6 76 91	2.5 78 93	0.7 79 93	1 78 93	1.3 78 93	2.1 77 93	7.2 75 89	9.4 73 84	8.1 72 82
- █ Average max. and min. temperatures in °F
- █ Precipitation totals in inches

The district shares boundaries with Anuradhapura, Matale, Trincomalee, Batticaloa and Ampara districts. Its landscape consists largely of low-lying plains and relatively flat terrain associated with the Mahaweli River basin, with elevations generally ranging from about 50 to 500 meters above sea level.

=== Climate and water resources ===
Polonnaruwa District has a tropical dry-zone climate, characterised by generally high temperatures and seasonal rainfall. The district receives much of its rainfall during the Northeast Monsoon and the inter-monsoon periods. Average annual rainfall is approximately 1,678 mm, while the annual mean temperature is around 27.3°C.

The district has an extensive irrigation network that supports its agricultural economy, particularly paddy cultivation. Major reservoirs include Parakrama Samudra, Minneriya, Kaudulla and Giritale. The Elahera Canal and other irrigation channels form part of this network, supplying water to agricultural areas across the district

Major reservoirs in polonnaruwa

Parakrama samudraya

Minneriya

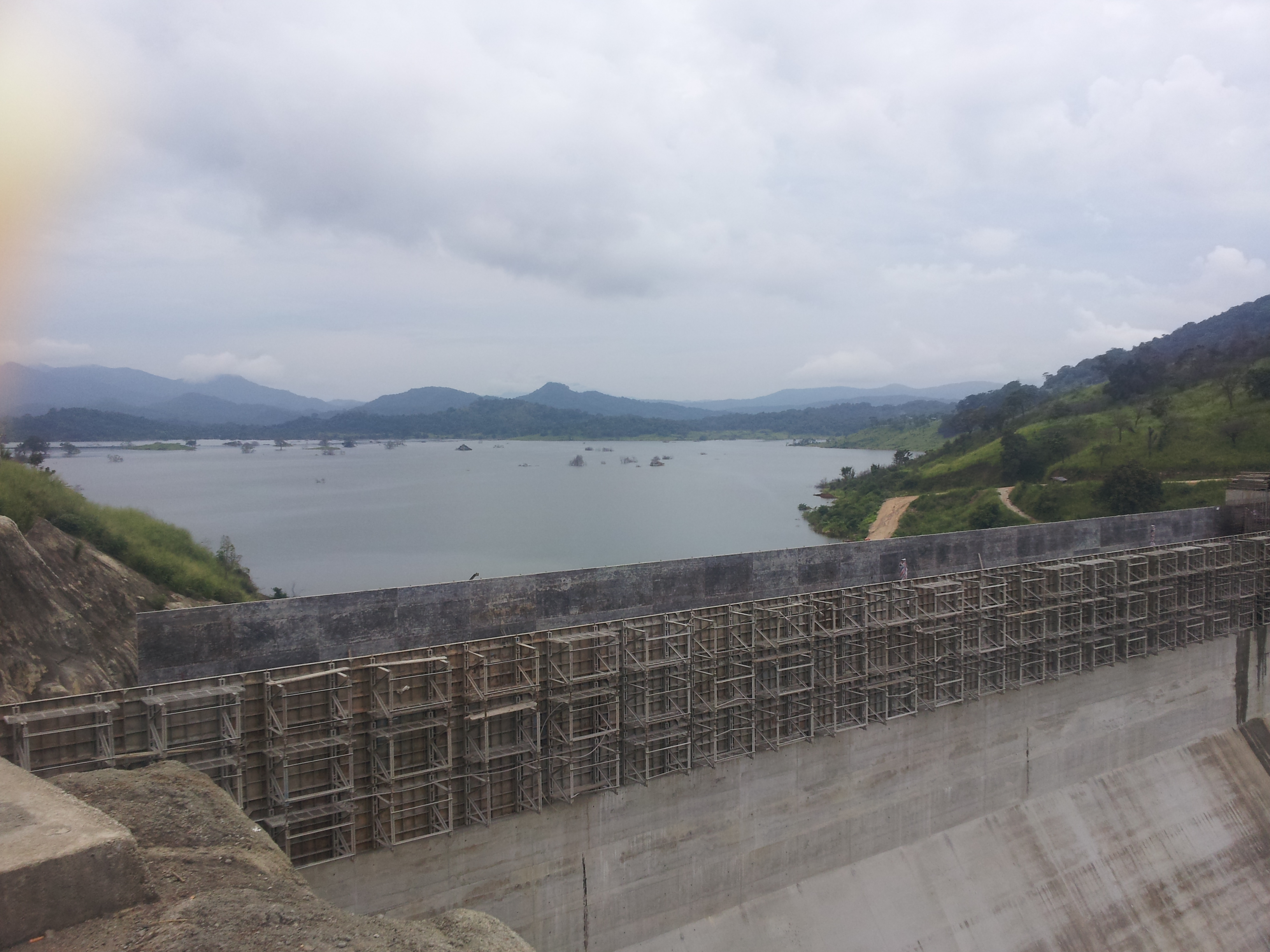

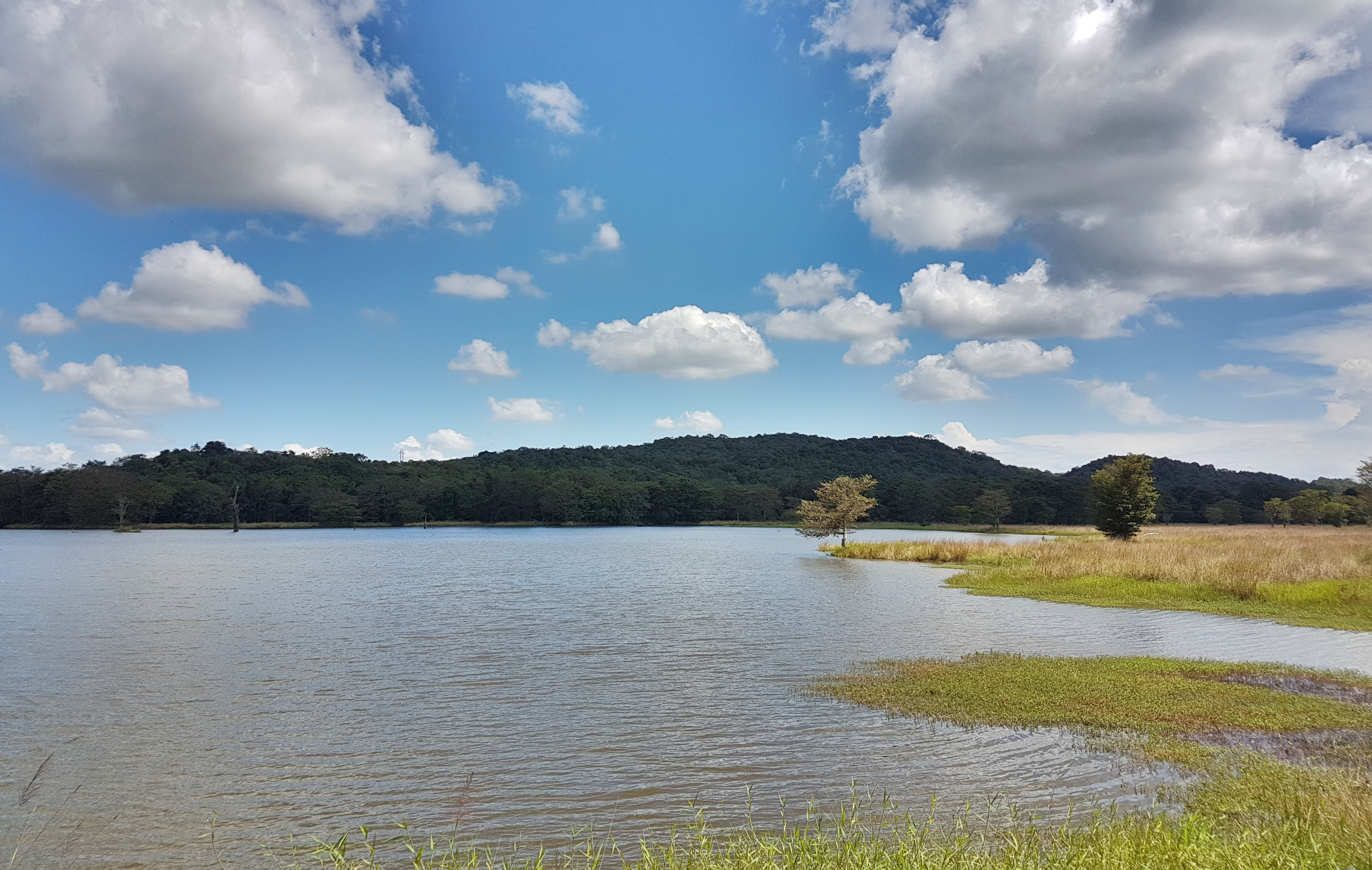
Kaudulla

Giritale

== Administrative Units ==
DS Division	Main Town	Divisional Secretary	GN Divisions	Area (km^{2})	Population
Thamankaduwa	Polannaruwa	Mr.W.M.I Karunarathne	55	468.78	94254
Hingurakgoda	Hingurakgoda	Mr.	53	709.04	77202
Medirigiriya	Medirigiriya	Mr.	45	574.04	78654
Lankapura	Thambala	Miss.R.W.R.M.C Ranawarna	27	184	43365
Welikanda	Welikanda	Mr.P.T.M Irfan	29	548	42700
Dimbulagala	Manampitiya	Mrs.M.M Hairunnisha	56	581.83	95807
Elahera	Bakamuna	Mr.C.M Karunarathne	28	227.31	49924

== Demographics ==
=== Ethnicity ===
Ethnicity in Polonnaruwa District (2024)
1. Sinhala (90.0%)
2. Sri Lankan Moors (8.23%)
3. Sri Lankan Tamils (1.65%)
4. Others (0.12%)

The majority of the population are Sinhalese with a minority Sri Lankan Moor and Sri Lankan Tamil population.

=== Religion ===
Religion in Polonnaruwa district (2024)
Religion	Percent
Buddhism	89.27%
Islam	8.29%
Hinduism	1.61%
Catholicism	0.57%
Other or not stated	0.26%

According to the 2011 census 89.7% of the population were Buddhists, 7.5% Muslim, 1.7% Hindu and 1% Christian.

== Economy ==
=== Agriculture ===
Agriculture is one of the main economic activities in Polonnaruwa District, with paddy cultivation forming the backbone of the sector. Supported by an extensive irrigation network, rice is cultivated during the Maha and Yala seasons. The district is among Sri Lanka's major paddy-producing areas and has historically accounted for a significant share of national rice production.

Araliya Rice Mill, Polonnaruwa

Nipuna Rice Mill, Minneriya

Rathna Rice Mill, Welikanda

Rice cultivation has also supported the development of a substantial rice-milling and processing industry. Polonnaruwa is home to numerous large- and medium-scale rice mills, which purchase paddy from local farmers as well as other agricultural districts for processing and distribution. Businesses associated with the industry include Araliya, Nipuna and New Rathna. Other agricultural activities include the cultivation of maize, onions, groundnuts and other field crops, alongside livestock farming and inland fishing.

=== Tourism ===
Tourism is another important economic activity in Polonnaruwa District, supported by its archaeological heritage, religious sites and natural environment. The ancient city of Polonnaruwa, a UNESCO World Heritage Site, attracts both domestic and international visitors to its historic monuments, temples, museums and archaeological remains.

Polonnaruwa tourism statistics (2025)
Heritage site visitors	Tourism revenue	Registered accommodation rooms
272,852	Rs. 1.189 billion	779
Visitors	Revenue	Rooms

The district also offers nature-based tourism, particularly around its reservoirs, wildlife habitats and protected areas. These attractions support local businesses, including hotels, guesthouses, restaurants, transport services and tour operators. Tourism therefore contributes to employment and income generation within the district.

== Politics and government ==
=== Local government ===
Local Authority	Registered Electors	Elected Members					
Local Authority	Registered Electors	SLPP	SLFP	UNP	JVP	Other	Total
Dimbulagala Divisional Council	64142	7	7	6	1	0	21
Elahera Divisional Council	36567	9	4	4	0	1	18
Hingurakgoda Divisional Council	50546	13	10	8	2	0	33
Lankapura Divisional Council	28369	6	8	7	1	2	24
Medirigiriya Divisional Council	52530	14	9	9	2	0	34
Polonnaruwa Divisional Council	38459	5	8	3	1	0	17
Polonnaruwa Municipal Council	24809	3	5	2	1	0	11
Welikanda Divisional Council	21182	5	6	5	0	0	16
Total	316604	62	57	44	8	3	174

== Education ==
Following are some of the schools in the Polonnaruwa District.

- Royal Central College, Polonnaruwa
- Thopawewa National School, Polonnaruwa
- Polonnaruwa Muslim Central College, Kaduruwela
- Rajarata College, Hingurakgoda
- Ananda Balika National School, Hingurakgoda
- Minneriya National School, Minneriya
- Medirigiriya National School, Medirigiriya
- Diulankadawala Central College, Diulankadawala
- Mahasen National School, Bakamuna
- Vilayaya Nationala School, Aralaganwila
- Polonnaruwa Sungavil Muslim Maha Vidyalaya
- PL/Onegama Muslim Kanista Vidayala

== Towns ==
- Kaduruwela
- Hingurakgoda
- Minneriya
- Bakamuna
- Aralaganwila
- Medirigiriya
- Giritale
- Elahera
- Jayantipura
- Galamuna
- Lankapura
- Sungavila
- Manampitiya
- Siripura
- Welikanda
- Dimbulagala
- Thambala
- Pulastigama
