= Welikanda Divisional Secretariat =

- Divisional Secretariat
- Country: Sri Lanka
- Province: North Central Province
- District: Polonnaruwa District
- Time zone: UTC+5:30 (Sri Lanka Standard Time)

Welikanda Divisional Secretariat is a Divisional Secretariat of Polonnaruwa District, of North Central Province, Sri Lanka.

== Demography-Religion ==
Religion in Welikanda DS Division (2012)
1. Buddhist (73.8%)
2. Hindu (10.4%)
3. Muslim (14.6%)
4. Roman Catholic (0.60%)
5. Other Christian (0.60%)
6. Other (0.00%)
