= Girihandu Seya =

Buddhist temple in Sri Lanka

- ගිරිහඬු සෑය கிரிஹன்டு சாய
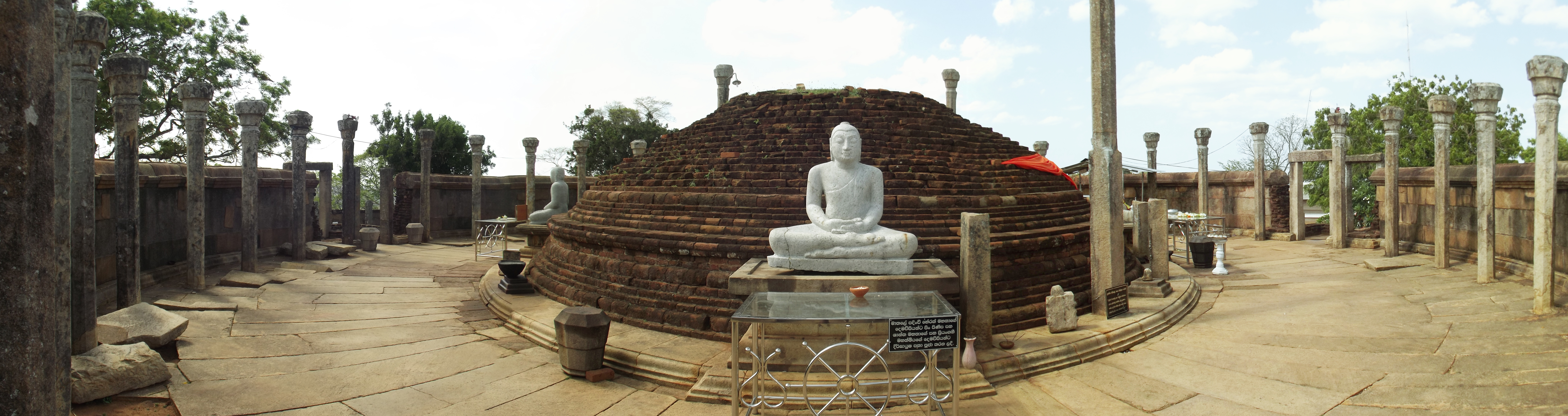
- The Vatadage and the Stupa

Religion
- Affiliation: Buddhism
- District: Trincomalee
- Province: Eastern Province

Location
- Location: Thiriyai, Trincomalee, Sri Lanka
- Interactive map of Girihandu Seya
- Coordinates: 08°52′13.4″N 81°00′26.2″E

Architecture
- Type: Buddhist Temple
- Founder: built by Trapassuka and Vallika Discovered by J.A Jemis
- Archaeological Protected Monument of Sri Lanka
- Designated

Girihandu Seya (also known as Nithupathpana Vihara (Note: Nitupatpana is mentioned in Nampota, an 18th-century compiled book about the important Buddhist shrine list in Sri Lanka)) is an ancient Buddhist temple situated in Thiriyai, Trincomalee, Sri Lanka. The temple is supposed to be the first Buddhist Stupa in Sri Lanka, believed to be constructed by two seafaring merchants Trapusa and Bahalika. The names of the two merchants are recorded in a rock inscription found in the Vihara premises. According to the inscription, Girihandu Seya was built by the guilds of merchants named Trapassuka and Vallika where the names are written as Tapassu and Bhalluka in later Sinhala chronicles. Some scholars also hold the view that Mahayana influenced seafaring merchants from the Pallava Kingdom were responsible for the construction of this temple.

The Stupa in the Vihara is highly venerated by the people, as it is believed to contain the hair relics of Buddha. The temple has been formally recognised by the Government as an archaeological site in Sri Lanka.

== The temple ==
The temple is situated on a small hillock near the sea coast about 47 km (29 mi) to the north of Trincomalee. The summit is occupied by a Vatadage containing the Stupa in the centre. The Stupa was originally small in size and had been enlarged in the 8th century A.D. The Vatadageya covers the Stupa with concentric circles of stone pillars similar to Thuparama and Lankarama Stupas at Anuradhapura. The stone made circular platform of the Vatadageya is opened to the four directions and accessed by flight of steps with guardstones (Muragala) and balustrades (Korawak Gala) showing the usual Sinhalese architecture. On the terraces lower than the Vatadageya are vestiges of monastic structures including ruined buildings, stone pillars, flight of steps, ponds, and remains of a stone bridge. The slope of the hill are some rock caves, two of which contain Brahmi inscriptions, one in the pre-Christian form of that script and the other dating from about the first century. To the South of the Vatadageya is another rock inscription engraved on the a rock surface, which contain eleven line of writings revealing the names of two merchants as well as the temple.

The short prose inscription in the Vihara, written in Sanskrit, states that it was indited in the 23rd year of the reign of king Silamegha, Lord of Simhala. This monarch in the inscription is identified with the king Aggabodi VI (741-781 A.D.) whose envoy Amoghavajra, a Mahayana teacher of great repute arrived in China in 742 A.D. Near to the temple is the Nithupathpana tank which is said to be constructed by King Vasaba (67–111 AD). The temple was repaired later by king Vijayabhahu I (1055–1110 AD).

== The inscription with names ==
The inscription covers an area of 20 ft by 5 ft written in Sanskrit language with the resembling South Indian Pallava Grantha scripts. On the whole the scripts are not quite identical with any of the known scripts of South India. (Note: These differences, however, are of a type which may easily be due merely to individuality of the different scribe and the difference in the material on which the record are engraved. It must, nevertheless, be emphasized that the scrip of this record is not quite identical with any found in South India.) Similar scripts also have been found in the graffiti on the gallery wall at Sigiriya where it contains a single Sanskrit verse and several verses in Sinhalese. Mahayana images and sculptures of the Pallava style belonging to the 8th century AD was found at this site. (Note: The bronze from Tiriyay (PI. 22A) follows the same iconic formula, but bears the Buddha effigy in front of the jatamakuta. The elongated form of the hair bun, the calm expression and quiet elegance are reminiscent of the Pallava tradition of South East India...A remarkable bronze from Tiriyāy (Pl.25B) faithfully reproduces the characteristic marks of the Vajradharma-Lokeśvara aspect of Avalokiteśvara, as are described in Indian iconographic texts... This form of Avalokitesvara attained popularity in the Āndhra/Pallava region of South India around the eighth century (see Pl.17) and seems to have been prevalent in Sri Lanka during the ninth to tenth centuries.(Nandana Cūṭivoṅgs, p.61-62)) (Note: The dvadrapala figures at the circular shrine at Tiriyay, which is datable in the eighth century, (Plate XIX b) exhibit the elongated limbs and the cold severity of expression with distinguish Pallava work. (Book III:Chapter VII, Civilization of the period: Religion, Literature, and Art#Sculpture, by S. Paranavitana p.403))

The inscription records an account of two sea-faring merchants. Most of the part of the document is occupied by a long eulogy of a shrine name Girikandi Caitya. The eulogy is followed by the pious wish of the author whose name is not found in the preserved portion. The final lines state that Girikandi Caitya was founded by the guilds of merchants named Trapussaka and Vallika. The record ends with a Buddhist formula about the transitoriness of things.

=== Trapussaka and Vallika ===
The names Trapussaka and Vallika are said to be corruptions of Trapusa (Tapussa and Tapassu in Pali) and Bhallika, the names of two merchants who offered food to the Buddha immediately after his enlightenment. (Note: The incident is described in Mahavagga (Vinaya Pitaka, edited by H. Oldenberg, vol. i) p.3-4, Lalithavistara (Lefman's edition, vol. i) p.381, and Nidanakatha (Jataka, edited by Fausboll, vol. i) p.80-81. The name Bhallika is mentioned in Nadanakatha as Bhalluka) The chronicles, Mahavagga, Lalitavistara and Nidanakatha state that the two merchants from a country called Ukkala (Utkala in Sanskrit), were led to the Buddha by a Deva (Deviyo) and there they received some hair relics from the Buddha. They further state that the two merchants built a Stupa in their native country to enshrine the hair relics. It is said that the Chinese pilgrim Hieun Tsang had noticed the remains of two Stupas built over the hair relics, on his journey from Balkh to Bamian in Gandhara. (Note: Watter's Yuan Chwang, vol. i. p.111-113)

The Pujavaliya, a 13th-century Sinhalese religious work definitely states that the two merchants Tapassu and Bhalluka built a Stupa, enshrining the hair relics after they went on a sea voyage and came to the island of Sri Lanka. It further state that the two merchants came to the place called Girihandu and placed the casket of the relic on the summit of the rock and went for the eat. When they returned after having cooked and eaten their meals they couldn't move the relic casket from the place where it was. Finally giving honour to it they covered the casket by a heap of stones and went their way. It is said that in later times there was a Vihara named Girihandu at that place. (Note: Pujavaliya, Colombo edition of 1922, p.184)

Meanwhile, the Burmese Buddhists also firmly believe that the two merchants enshrined the hair relics of Buddha in their own Shwedagon Pagoda in Yangon.
