= Polonnaruwa Vatadage =

Ancient structure in Sri Lanka

Coordinates: 7°56′50″N 81°0′4″E

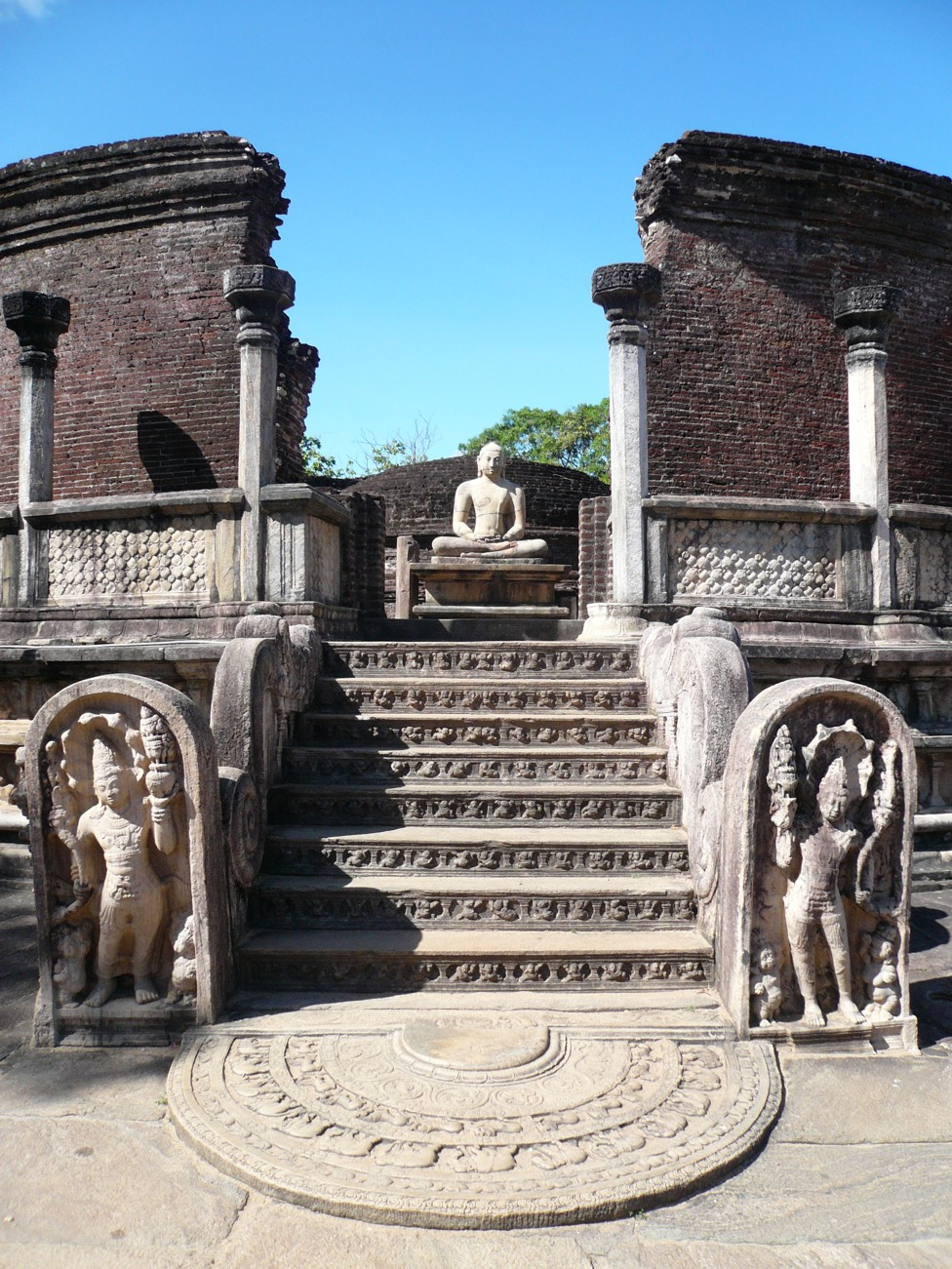
One of the four doorways leading to the Vatadage.

The Polonnaruwa Vatadage is an ancient structure dating back to the Kingdom of Polonnaruwa of Sri Lanka. It is believed to have been built during the reign of Parakramabahu I to hold the Relic of the tooth of the Buddha or during the reign of Nissanka Malla of Polonnaruwa to hold the alms bowl used by the Buddha. Both these venerated relics would have given the structure a great significance and importance at the time. Located within the ancient city of Polonnaruwa, it is the best preserved example of a vatadage in the country, and has been described as the "ultimate development" of this type of architecture. Abandoned for several centuries, excavation work at the Polonnaruwa Vatadage began in 1903.

Built for the protection of a small stupa, the structure has two stone platforms decorated with elaborate stone carvings. The lower platform is entered through a single entrance facing the north, while the second platform can be accessed through four doorways facing the four cardinal points. The upper platform, surrounded by a brick wall, contains the stupa. Four Buddha statues are seated around it, each facing one of the entrances. Three concentric rows of stone columns had also been positioned here, presumably to support a wooden roof. The entire structure is decorated with stone carvings. Some of the carvings at the Polonnaruwa Vatadage, such as its sandakada pahanas, are considered to be the best examples of such architectural features. Although some archaeologists have suggested that it also had a wooden roof, this theory is disputed by others.

== History ==
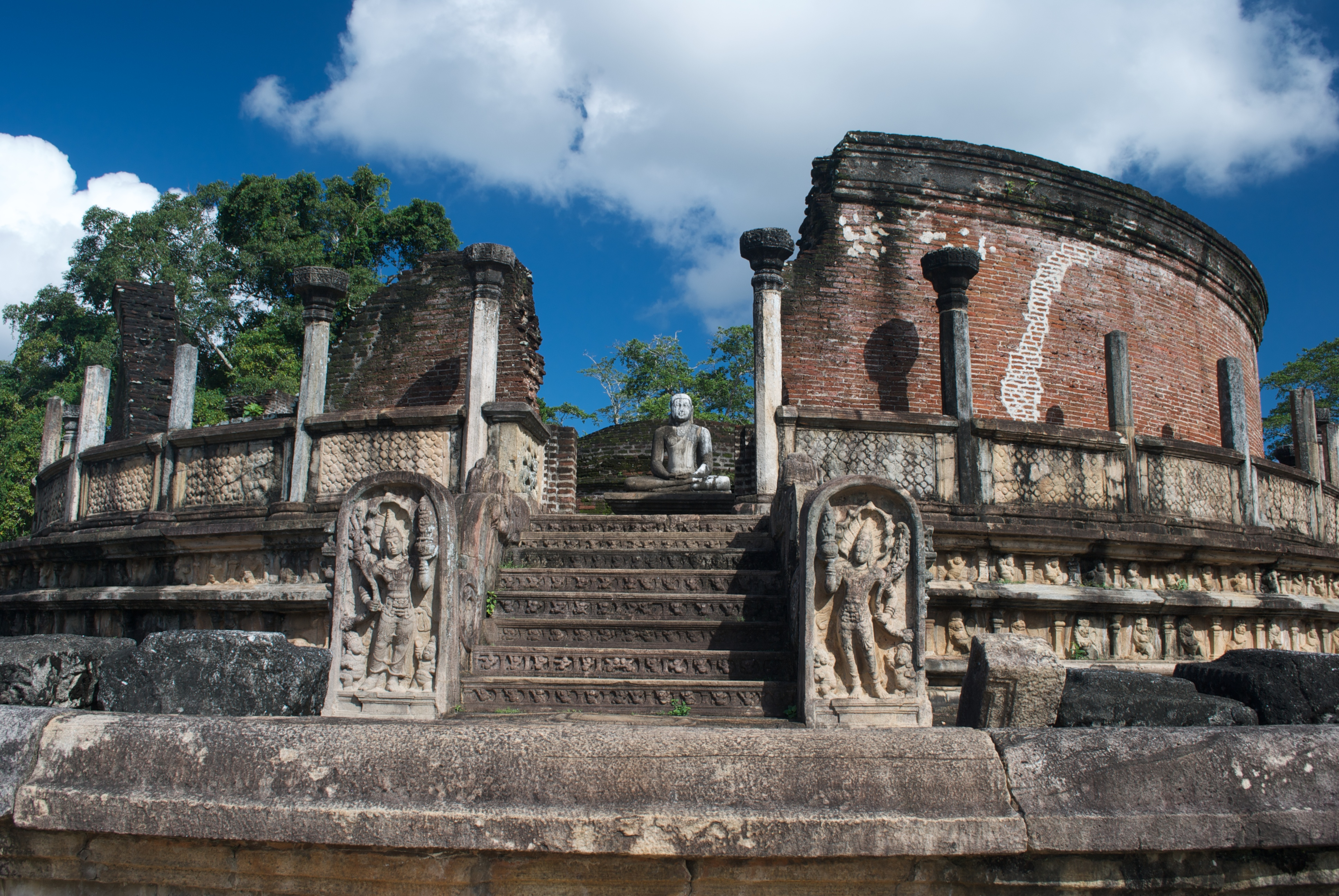
The Polonnaruwa Vatadage as seen today.

Theories vary among archaeologists and historians regarding who built the Polonnaruwa Vatadage, and when. One such theory suggests that it was built by Parakramabahu I during his reign in the 12th century. The Culavamsa, an ancient chronicle, mentions that he built a circular stone shrine to hold the tooth relic of the Buddha. Archaeologist Harry Charles Purvis Bell believed that this shrine is the Polonnaruwa Vatadage. This is contradicted by several ancient sources of the island, including Rajavaliya and Poojavaliya, which mention that it was built by Nissanka Malla. However, according to the studies of Arthur Maurice Hocart, Nissanka Malla only renovated an already existing building and made some additions such as the entrance and outer porch. Wilhelm Geiger, who translated the ancient Mahavamsa, and historian H. W. Codrington both agree with this theory. A nearby stone inscription set by Nissanka Malla lists the Vatadage among his constructions. In this, he claims that it was built by one of his generals under his own direction.

A unique feature of architecture of ancient Sri Lanka, vatadages were built for the protection of small stupas that had an important relic enshrined in them or were built on hallowed ground. If the Polonnaruwa Vatadage is the shrine built by Parakramabahu I, the relic of the tooth of the Buddha would have been enshrined within it. Another possibility is that the alms bowl used by the Buddha may have been enshrined here. Both these relics were important objects in ancient Sri Lankan culture, and would have made the Polonnaruwa Vatadage one of the most significant and venerated buildings in the country.

Polonnaruwa was abandoned in 1215 following an invasion from the Eastern Ganga Dynasty invader Kalinga Magha. The Polonnaruwa Vatadage appears to have been abandoned with the fall of the kingdom, and there is no mention of it in the chronicles in later periods. It was not until 1903 that the Department of Archaeology began excavation work at the site under Bell, who noted that it was "only a mound of earth" at the time.

== Location and appearance ==
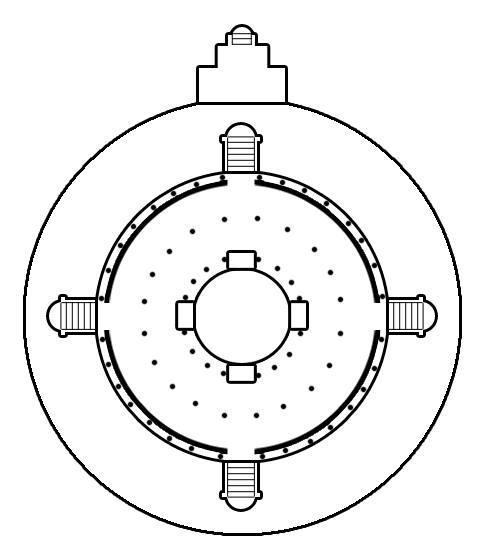
Layout of the Polonnaruwa Vatadage, with the outer circle indicating the lower platform and the second circle indicating the upper platform. The stupa, surrounded by four statues, as well as three concentric rows of stone columns are located in the upper platform which is accessed through four entrances.

The Polonnaruwa Vatadage is located in a quadrangular area known as the Dalada Maluva in the ancient city of Polonnaruwa. The Dalada Maluva contains some of the oldest and most sacred monuments of the city. The Polonnaruwa Vatadage, which occupies most of the south western area of it, is a prominent structure among them. It is the best preserved example of a Vatadage in the country, and is somewhat similar in design to those belonging to the Anuradhapura period, especially Thuparamaya and Lankaramaya.

The building has been built around a small stupa with a base diameter of 27 feet 8 inches (8.43 m). The Vatadage has two levels; the lower platform and the raised upper platform that contains the stupa. The upper platform is 80 feet (24 m) in diameter, and the lower one 120 feet (37 m). The lower platform is 4 feet 3 inches (1.30 m) from ground level, and the upper platform is 5 feet 3 inches (1.60 m) from the lower.

The circular lower platform is entered through a single entrance on the northern side. Four elaborately constructed doorways lead from it to the upper platform, which is surrounded by a brick wall on its edge. These entrances are oriented to the four cardinal directions. The center of this platform is occupied by the stupa, which has four Buddha statues seated around it, each facing one of the entrances. Each of these statues are 5 feet (1.5 m) high, and are seated on stone seats with a height of 2 feet 10 inches (0.86 m) each. Three concentric rows of stone columns had existed on the upper platform. Two of these rows, of which nothing remain, were within the brick wall, while the third row is just outside it. The inner row had consisted of 16 columns, the middle row of 20, and the outer row of 32. The existing stone columns of the outer ring are about 8 feet (2.4 m) in height.

== Architecture and stonemasonry ==
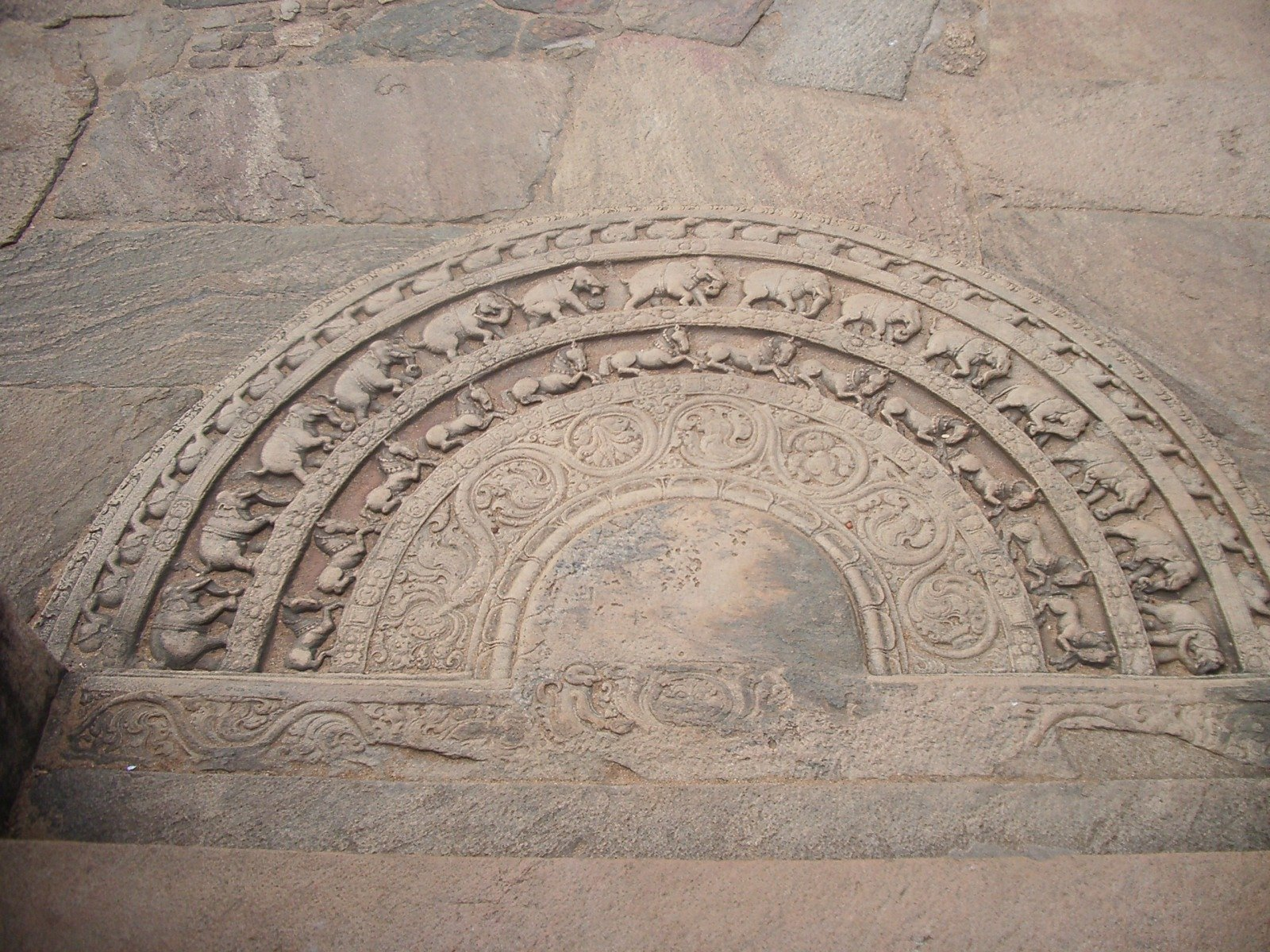
A sandakada pahana at one of the entrances.

Employing citizens in construction and repairing works was done in ancient Sri Lanka as a form of tax payment. Such labour may also have been used in the construction of the Polonnaruwa Vatadage. However, the quality of the works indicate that most of the task may have been carried out by skilled craftsmen. Architecture of vatadage type structures was at its peak during the Polonnaruwa period, and the Polonnaruwa Vatadage is considered to be its "ultimate development". Some of the most striking features of the structure are its elaborate stone carvings. The sandakada pahana (moonstone) at the northern entrance and the two muragalas (guard stone) at the eastern entrance are considered to be the best examples of such architectural features belonging to the Polonnaruwa period. These decorational elements were commonly placed at entrances to monastic buildings of ancient Sri Lanka, and historians believe that sandakada pahanas depict the cycle of Saṃsāra in Buddhism. According to Bell, the carvings on the sides of the upper platform are "unrivalled, whether at Anuradhapura or Polonnaruwa, and probably in any other Buddhist shrine of Ceylon".

The straight, symmetrical stone columns found in the Polonnaruwa Vatadage are quite similar to those seen in buildings of the Anuradhapura period. The foot of each column is carved in the shape of a lotus flower. Archaeologist Senarath Paranavithana has suggested that these stone columns had supported a wooden roof. This is widely accepted, and nails and roof tiles found in excavations seem to support this. However, another theory is that the Vatadage did not have a roof, and the stone columns were used to hang lamps, curtains or Buddhist symbols.

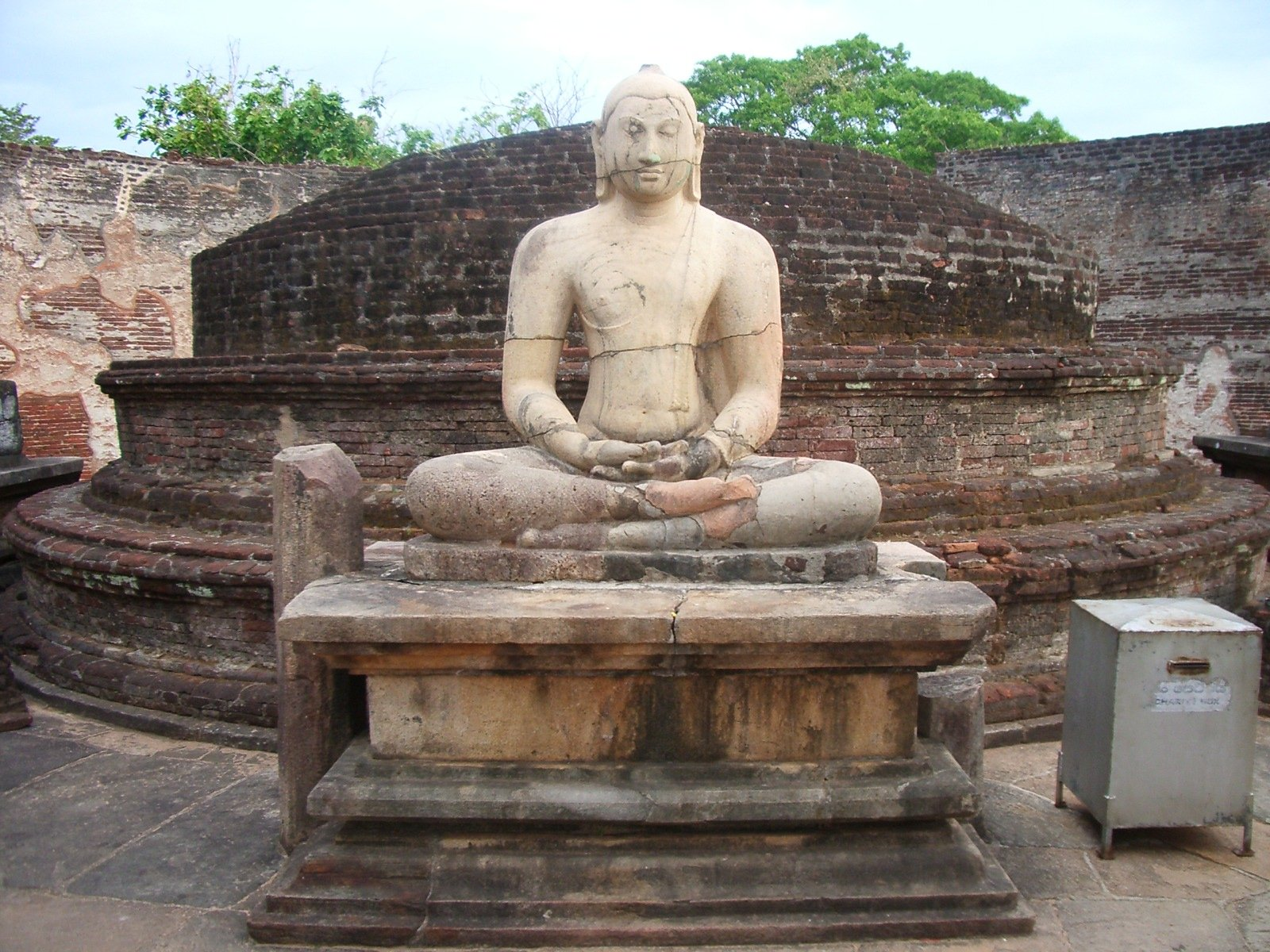
One of the Buddha statues on the upper platform, positioned next to the stupa. The brick wall is visible on the background.

The brick wall around the platform is in a considerably preserved state as well, although parts of it have broken off. It is quite thick—2 feet 6 inches (0.76 m)—and was presumably constructed to protect the stupa from the sides. There is evidence that inner surface of the wall had been adorned with paintings. Its lower portion is covered by stone panels with carvings of a flower design. Below the wall, the side of the upper platform itself is decorated with carvings, as is the side of the lower platform.

The four Buddha statues, which depict the Dhyana mudra, are also carved from solid rock. Two of them are more or less intact today, while only parts of the other two remain. The stupa in the middle appears to have been of the Bubbulakara (bubble shaped) design commonly seen in Sri Lanka. The upper part has been destroyed, and only the dome shaped lower part now remains. However, it has only two Pesavas (the rings found at the base of stupas) rather than the traditional three.

== See also ==
- Vatadage
- Medirigiriya Vatadage

== Bibliography ==
- Amarasinghe, Malinga (1998). පොළොන්නරුවේ නටබුන් [The Ruins of Polonnaruwa] (in Sinhala). S. Godage & Brothers. ISBN 955-20-3051-X.
- Bandaranayake, Senake (1974). Sinhalese monastic architecture: the viháras of Anurádhapura. Brill Publishers. ISBN 978-90-04-03992-6.
- Basnayake, H. T. (1986). Sri Lankan Monastic Architecture. Sri Satguru Publications. ISBN 81-7030-009-6.
- Prematilleke, P. L.; Karunaratne, L. K. (2004). Polonnaruwa – The Silver Capital of Sri Lanka. Colombo: Central Cultural Fund, Ministry of Cultural Affairs. ISBN 955-613-111-6.
- Sarachchandra, B. S. (1977). අපේ සංස්කෘතික උරුමය (Cultural Heritage) (in Sinhala). Silva, V. P.
- Seneviratna, Anuradha; Polk, Benjamin (1992). Buddhist monastic architecture in Sri Lanka: the woodland shrines. Abhinav Publications. ISBN 978-81-7017-281-9.
- Siriweera, W. I. (2004). History of Sri Lanka. Dayawansa Jayakodi & Company. ISBN 955-551-257-4.
- von Schroeder, Ulrich (1990). Buddhist Sculptures of Sri Lanka. Hong Kong: Visual Dharma Publications, Ltd. ISBN 962-7049-05-0.
- von Schroeder, Ulrich (1992) [catalogue of the exhibition held at the Arthur M. Sackler Gallery, Washington, D. C., 1 November 1992 – 26 September 1993.]. The Golden Age of Sculpture in Sri Lanka – Masterpieces of Buddhist and Hindu Bronzes from Museums in Sri Lanka. Hong Kong: Visual Dharma Publications, Ltd. ISBN 962-7049-06-9.
