= Thiriyai =

Thiriyai තිරියාය
- Village
- Location within Sri Lanka
- Coordinates: 8°52′13″N 81°0′27″E
- Country: Sri Lanka
- Province: Eastern
- District: Trincomalee
- DS Division: Kuchchaveli

Government
  - Type: Municipal Council
  - Body: Trincomalee

Population (2012)
  - Total: 640
- Time zone: Sri Lanka Standard Time Zone

Thiriyai (Sinhala: තිරියාය, romanized: Tiriyāya, Tamil: திரியாய், romanized: Tiriyāy) is a small village in the eastern Trincomalee District of Sri Lanka. It is situated about 25 miles north of Trincomalee town through Nilaveli. The total population of the village is 640 at the 2012 census.

Thiriyai was an international emporium with an old sea port which existed since at least 6th century BCE.

Due to the ethnic conflict, most families fled the village and are now living elsewhere in the country or overseas. Several Tamil refugees returned to the village in the early 21st century during a ceasefire.

== Etymology ==
The name Thiriyai is derived from the Tamil word thiri, meaning wick.

== History ==
Thiriyai was populated by ancient Naga tribe. The place is referred to as Talacori Emporium in the 2nd century AD map of the Greek geographer Ptolemy, which was an old seaport that existed from at least 6th century BCE.

The Buddhist temple Girihandu Seya, an almost complete example of vatadage, is located close to this village. The temple is supposed to be the first Buddhist Stupa in Sri Lanka. Legends attribute the constructing of the temple by the Trapusa and Bahalika merchants of the 4th century BCE, bringing with them the hair relics of Gautama Buddha. Scholars holds the view that Mahayana influenced seafaring merchants from the Pallava Kingdom were responsible for the construction of this temple.

A 7th century AD inscription found in the Girihandu Seya temple, written in Sanskrit language with the South Indian Pallava Grantha script, indicates the presence of the Avalokiteśvara cult in Sri Lanka. This inscription attributes with showing the influence of the Pallava dynasty in Sri Lanka and on Sinhala script. The Mahayana images and Pallava sculptural styles indicates on the presence of South Indian artists.

Sri Lankan Tamils refer to this place as Kandaswamy malai and venerate this place as the hill of Murugan. Thiriyai has traditionally been connected with the Koneswaram temple in Trincomalee and the Kandaswamy malai hill is referred as Kanthathiri in the Tamil text Thiruppugazh.

The Vaiya Paadal, a 17th-century Tamil historical text, refers to Cupatittu, a Brahmin, who ruled Thiriyai in the 15th century. Thiriyai was part of Vanni Nadu and was once ruled by the Vanniar Chieftain, Neela Panikkan. The hill known as Neelanpanikkan malai and the pond known as Neelanpanikkan kulam was named after him. Ruins of his fortress is found on the hilltop.

The area remained a Tamil village, although experienced settling of 72 Sinhalese families north of Thiriyai in the 1960s. Killing of civilians in the 90s in Thiriyai attributed by the Sri Lanka Army and other ethnic tension lead to most family fleeing the area to India with boat, thereupon the area being nearly deserted.

== See also ==
- Kinniya
- Nilaveli
- Tamil Buddhism
