= Vatadage =

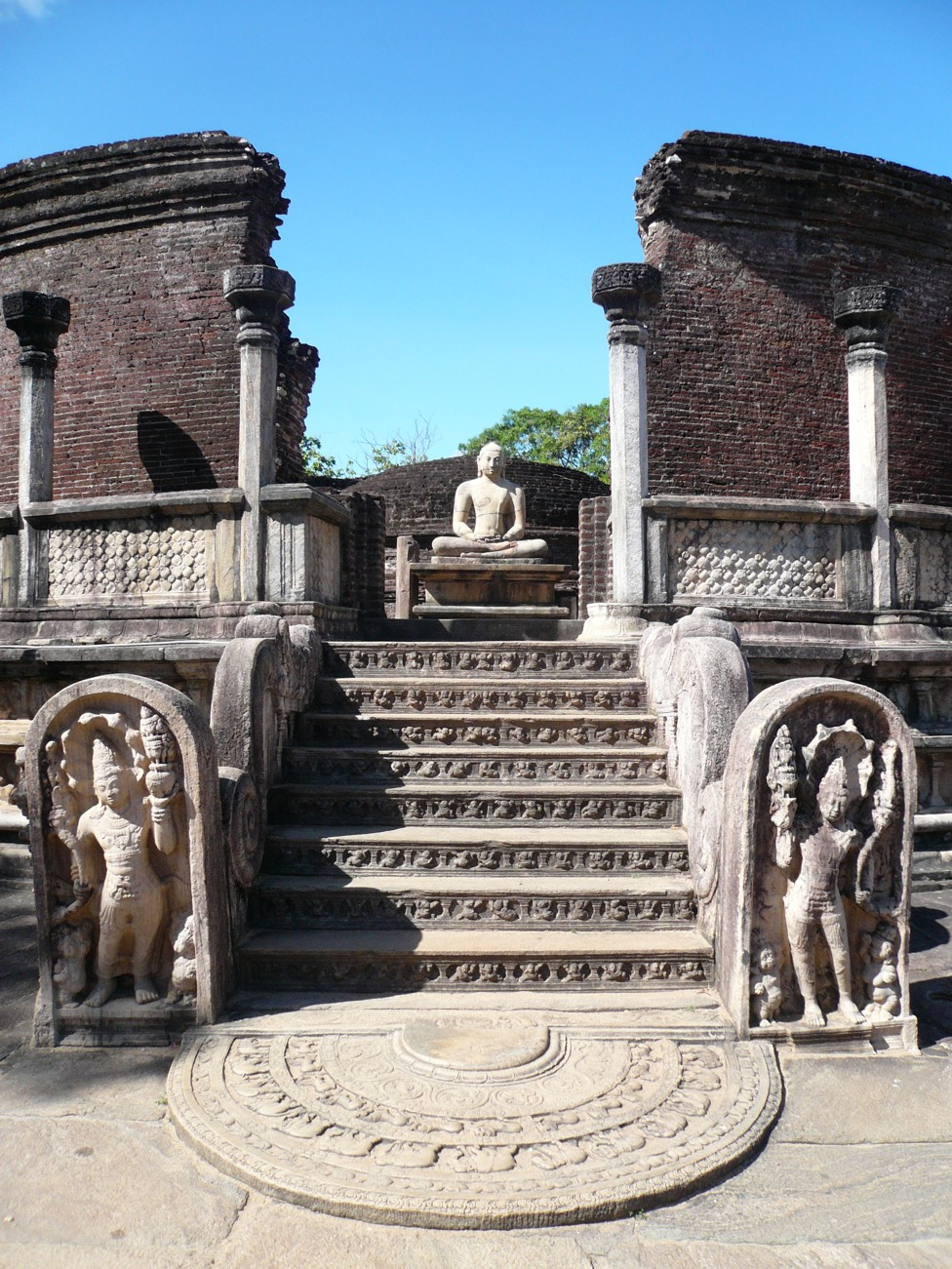
An entrance of the Polonnaruwa Vatadage.

A vaṭadāge (Sinhala: වටදාගෙ) is a type of Buddhist structure found in Sri Lanka. It also known as a dage, thupagara and a cetiyagara. Although it may have had some Indian influence, it is a structure that is more or less unique to the architecture of ancient Sri Lanka. Vatadages were built around small stupas for their protection, which often enshrined a relic or were built on hallowed ground. Circular in shape, they were commonly built of stone and brick and adorned with elaborate stone carvings. Vatadages may have also had a wooden roof, supported by a number of stone columns arranged in several concentric rows.

Only ten vatadages now remain in Sri Lanka. The builders of many of these monuments are unknown, as are their time of creation. The oldest such construction is believed to be the one surrounding the Thuparamaya. The best example of a vatadage is generally believed to be the Polonnaruwa Vatadage. Along with it, the vatadages at Medirigiriya and Thiriyaya remain more or less intact.

== Etymology ==
Although popularly known as vatadage now, the structure has had several different names. In ancient Sinhalese literature, this type of structure is referred to as vatadage or dage. The 12th and 13th century chronicles Pujavaliya and Dalada Siritha use these names when mentioning the Thuparamaya and Polonnaruwa Vatadage. However, Pali texts use the name thupaghara. The name cetiyaghara is also used in some sources.

The word vatadage literally means circular relic house or shrine. Dage simply means "relic house". Similarly, cetiyaghara means "cetiya-house" and thupaghara "stupa-house".

== Features ==
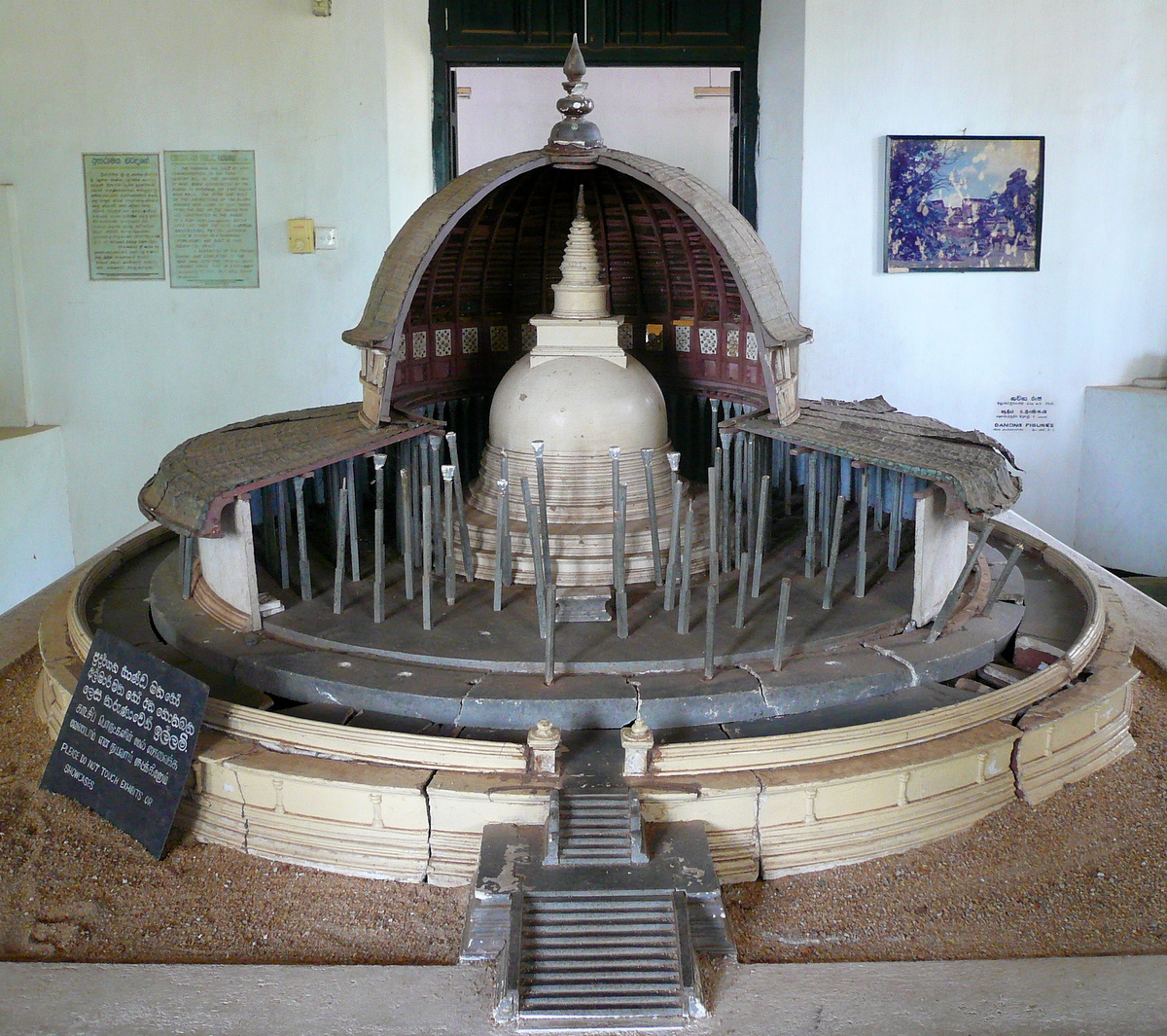
A model of the Thuparama Vatadage in the museum of Anuradhapura, showing what the original structure may have looked like.

Vatadages were circular in shape. They were constructed around small stupas for their protection, as well as shelter for devotees. The stupa is located at the centre of a raised circular platform, commonly paved with stone. The vatadage in Polonnaruwa has two platforms, one above the other. This platform contained several concentric rows of stone columns. The columns on the inner row were the highest, while the heights of the columns in the outer rows gradually diminished as they spread further from the center. The number of stone columns and rows have varied from structure to structure, with the vatadage in Lankarama originally having as many as 88 columns.

The concentric rows of stone columns were presumably used to support a wooden roof. However, it is disputed if a roof was constructed in some vatadages. If a roof did exist, the part over the stupa itself may have been domed. However, the positioning of the stone columns suggests that the rest of the roof may have been conical in shape. A brick wall often surrounded this platform, and there is evidence that the inside of this wall had been adorned with paintings.

Vatadages often had four entrances, usually oriented to the four cardinal directions. However, not all of them have been built according to this tradition, and vatadages such as the Thuparama have only one entrance. These entrances were elaborately decorated. The steps that lead to the raised platform were adorned with carvings, as were the korawakgalas (stone balustrades). A sandakada pahana (moonstone) was placed at the foot of the steps, flanked by two muragalas (guard stones).

== History ==
Some ancient stupas in India have platforms decorated with carvings at their bases, such as the Amaravati stupa in Andhra Pradesh. Although this type of structure may have influenced the more elaborate vatadage, it is more or less unique to ancient Sri Lankan architecture.

The oldest vatadage in Sri Lanka is believed to be the one at the Thuparama temple in Anuradhapura. It was built by Vasabha around an already existing stupa, during his reign from 67 to 111 AD. Although a number of vatadages were built following this, in most cases it is uncertain who constructed them or when. Only ten vatadages now remain in the country. These are located at Thuparama, Lankarama, Mihintale, Polonnaruwa, Medirigiriya, Attanagalla, Rajangana, Menikdena, Devundara, and Tiriyaya. Of these, the vatadages at Polonnaruwa, Medirigiriya, and Tiriyaya are relatively well preserved, and provide a good indication as to the original appearance of this type of constructions. The vatadages at Mihintale and Attanagalla may have been constructed by Gothabhaya, who ruled in the 3rd century.

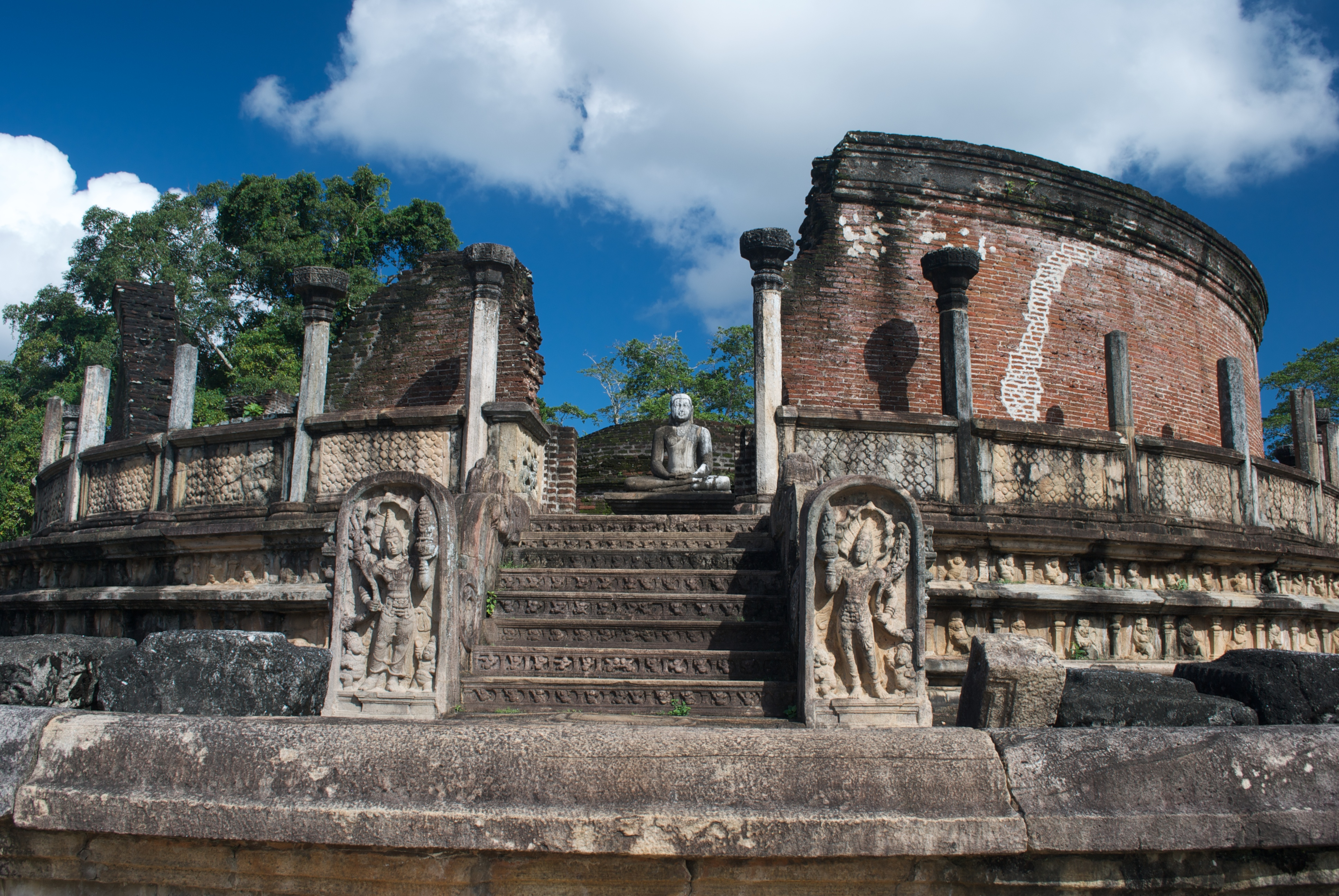
The Polonnaruwa Vatadage.

The Rajangane Vatadage, which was probably built during the 7th or 8th century, differs from others in that it has a square platform rather than a circular one. The vatadage at Tiriyaya was built in the 8th century. The Polonnaruwa Vatadage, considered to be the "ultimate development" of vatadage architecture, was built during the 12th century.

Vatadages were usually constructed around stupas which were either built on hallowed ground or contained a relic of the Buddha or an object used by him. The Polonnaruwa Vatadage may have had the tooth relic of the Buddha enshrined within it. Similarly, it is believed that a hair relic of the Buddha is enshrined at Tiriyaya, and his collarbone at Thuparama. The Attanagalla and Mihintale vatadages are both believed to have been built over hallowed ground.

== 3D Model ==
The Zamani Project, document cultural heritage sites in 3D to create a record for future generations. The documentation is based on terrestrial laser-scanning. The 3D documentation of the Vatadage in Polonnaruwa was carried out in 2019. The following structures in Polunnaruwa where also documented in 3D: Gal Vihara; Kiri Vihera; Lankatilaka Vihara and the Quadrangle (Hatadage; Atadage; Recumbent-house; Chapter House; Gal Pota; Satmahal Prasada; Bodhisattva Shrine; Latha Mandapaya; Bodhi Tree Shrine and Thuparama Gedige).

== Bibliography ==
- Amarasinghe, Malinga (1998). පොළොන්නරුවේ නටබුන් [The Ruins of Polonnaruwa] (in Sinhala). S. Godage & Brothers. ISBN 955-20-3051-X.
- Prematilleke, P. L.; Karunaratne, L. K. (2004). Polonnaruwa - The Silver Capital of Sri Lanka. Colombo: Central Cultural Fund, Ministry of Cultural Affairs. ISBN 955-613-111-6.
- Sarachchandra, B. S. (1977). අපේ සංස්කෘතික උරුමය [Cultural Heritage] (in Sinhala). Silva, V. P.
- Siriweera, W. I. (2004). History of Sri Lanka. Dayawansa Jayakodi & Company. ISBN 955-551-257-4.
- Bandaranayake, Senake (1974). Sinhalese monastic architecture: the viháras of Anurádhapura. Brill Publishers. ISBN 978-90-04-03992-6.
