= Trapusa and Bahalika =

First two lay disciples of the Buddha

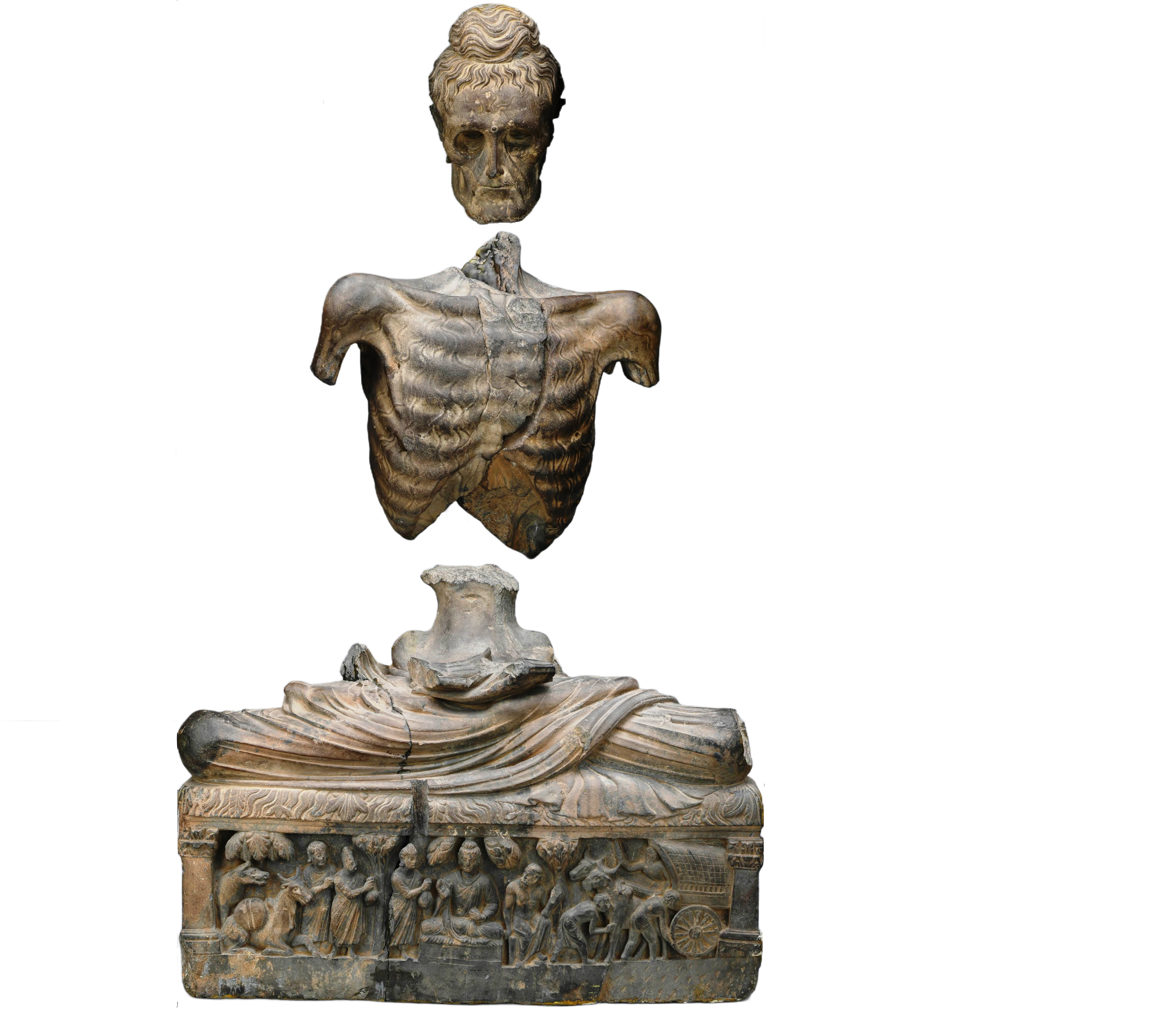

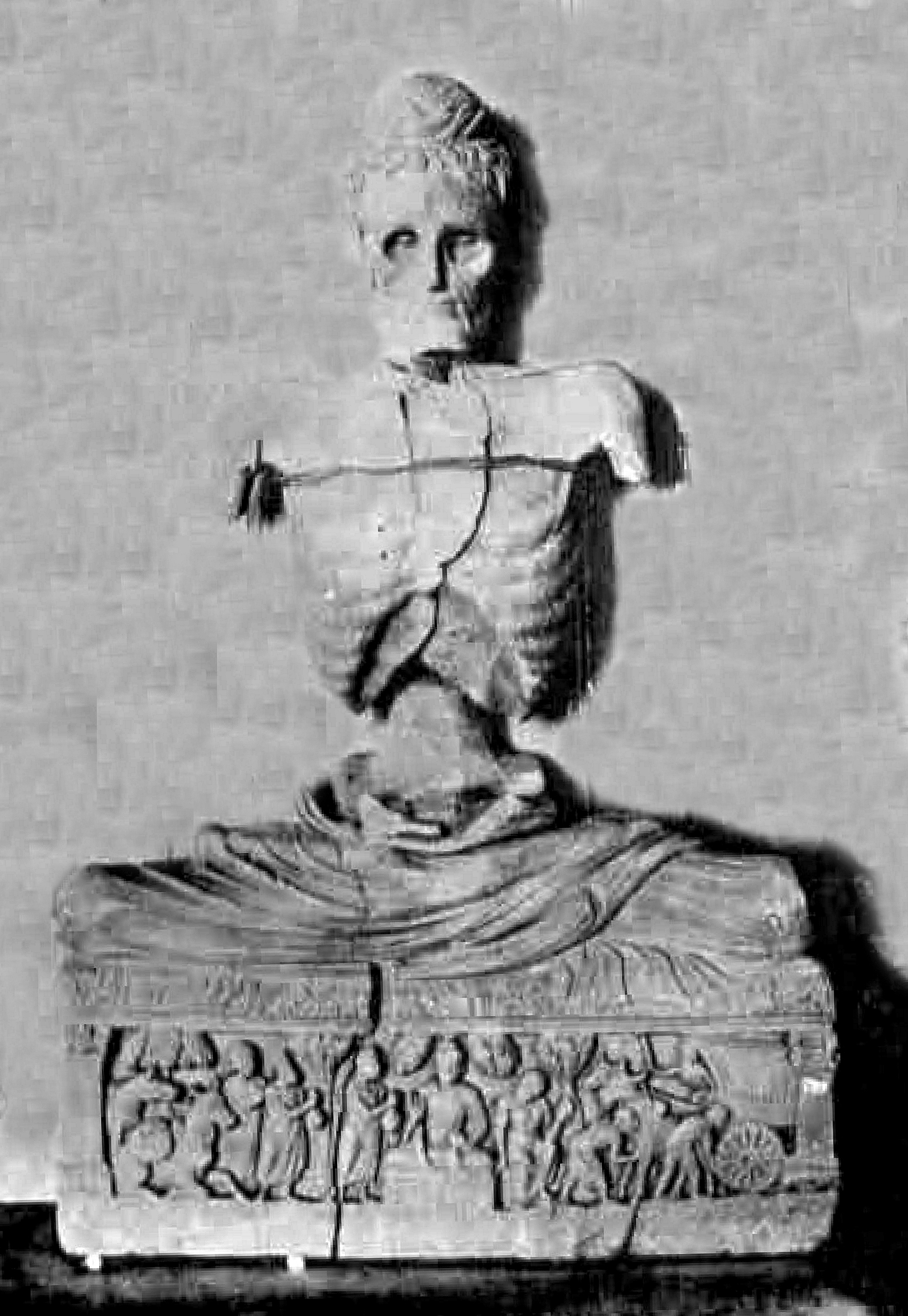
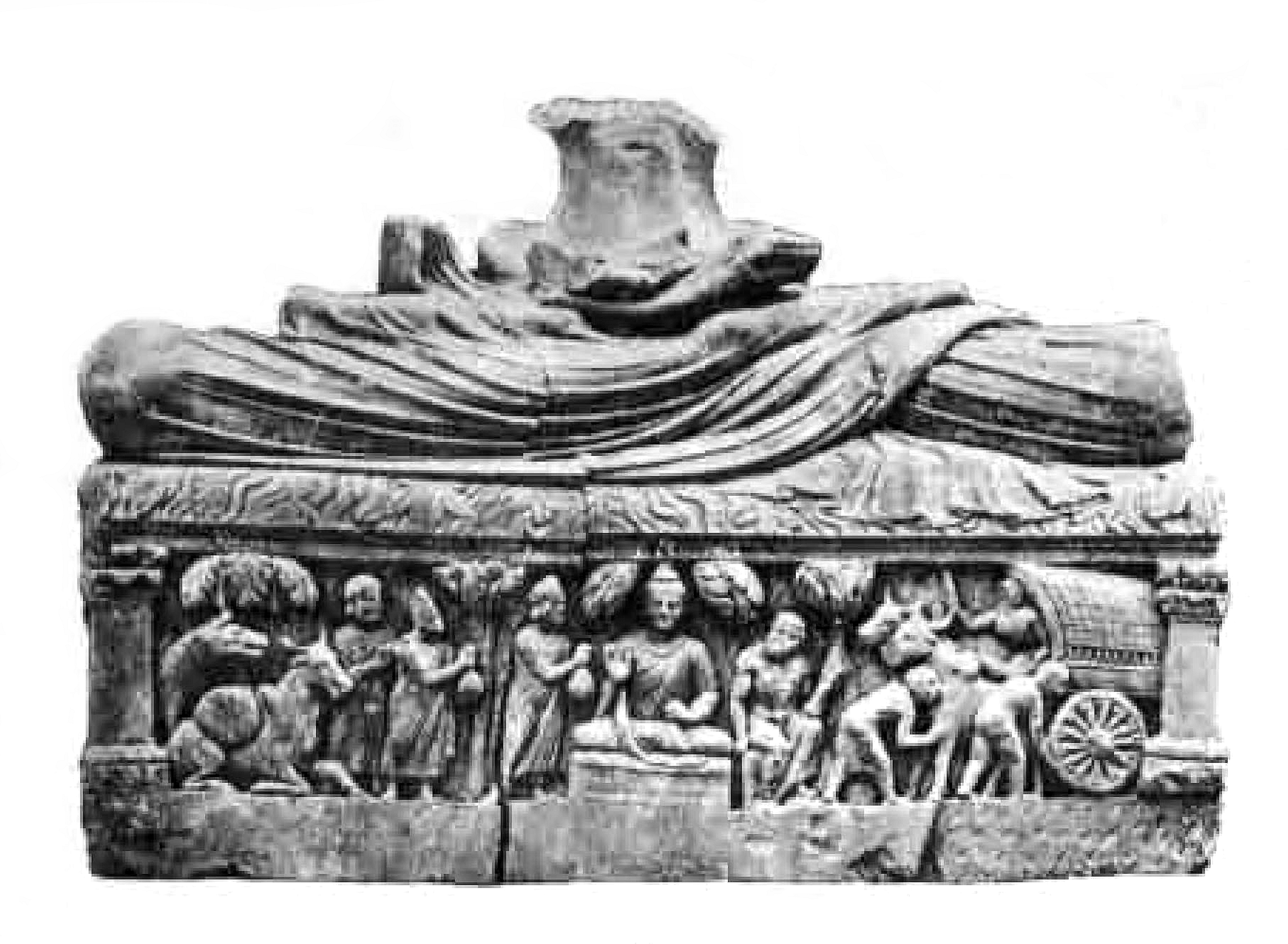
Fasting Buddha, with pedestal detail of the merchants Trapusa and Bahalika offering(donating) food to the Buddha. The pedestal reflect the details of the Buddhist account: a caravan of traders was led by a bullock cart which became mysteriously stuck in the vicinity of the fasting Buddha. Two nude or semi-nude figures can be seen trying to free the cart, while the rider wields the whip. The two merchants Trapusa and Bahalika were then told about the Buddha by the Genius of the Grove. They can be seen standing and dressed in gowns, offering food to the Buddha, next to their loaded donkeys. Behind them, the Genius of the Grove stands in Anjali mudra. The bearded man seated next to the Buddha and half-turned is his protector Vajrapani. Takht-i-Bahi, 2nd-3rd century CE, Peshawar Museum, Pakistan.

Trapusa and Bahalika (alternatively Bhallika) are traditionally regarded as the first disciples of the Buddha. The first account of Trapusa and Bahalika appears in the Vinaya section of the Tripiṭaka where they offer the Buddha his first meal after enlightenment, take refuge in the Dharma (while the Sangha was still not established), and become the Buddha's first disciples. According to the Pali canon, they were caravan drivers from Puṣkalāvatī (Pali: Pokkharavatī), in ukkalapada on way to Uttarapatha. Alternatively, they have been said to have come from Orissa or from Burma, i.e. modern Myanmar. Xuanzang (玄奘) says that Buddhism was brought to Central Asia by Trapusa and Bahalika.

The era of Trapusa and Bahalika is during the life of the Historical Buddha: most early 20th-century historians dated his birth and death as c. 563 BCE to 483 BCE, but more recent research dates his death to between 486 and 483 BCE or, according to others, between 411 and 400 BCE (or between 623 and 624 BCE). Many also claim that they originated from Gandhar Kingdom.

== Regional versions ==
=== Central Asia ===
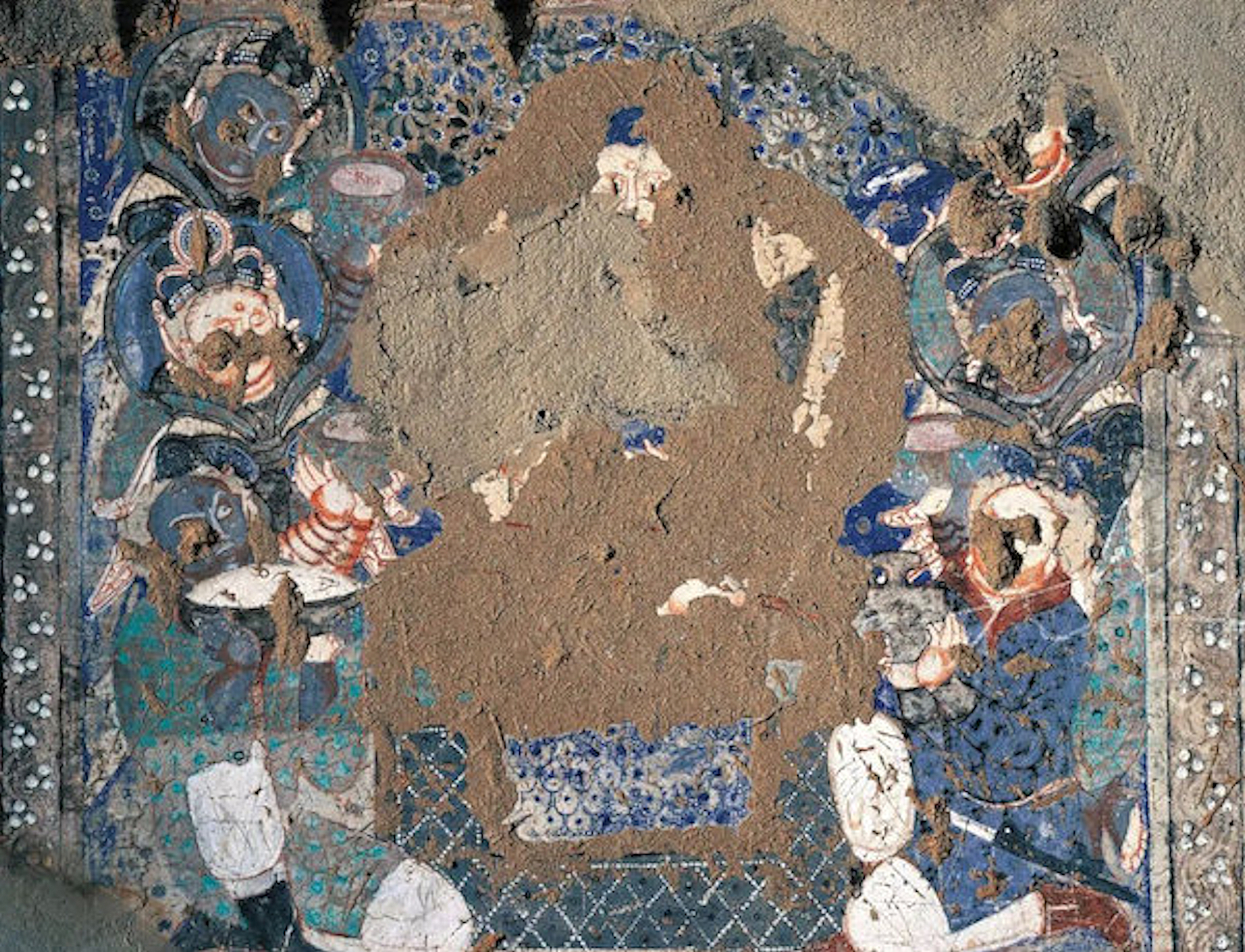
Central Asian devotees Trapusa and Bahalika, making an offering to the Buddha. Cave 110, Kizil Caves, 5th-6th century CE, Xinjiang, China.

Xuanzang recounts, having become his first disciples Trapusa and Bahalika wished his leave to return home, they asked the Buddha for something by which they could remember and honour him in his absence. The Buddha gave them eight of his hairs as relics. They made golden caskets for the relics and took them to their own city (Balkh) where they enshrined them in a stupa by the city gate. See Nava Vihara.

Xuanzang recounts that theirs was the first ever Buddhist Stupa to be made and that the Buddha had first to instruct them how to erect it by folding his three robes into squares piling them up and then topping them off with his inverted bowl.

=== Sri Lanka ===
What is stated in the chronicles of Sri Lanka is that, two merchant brothers, Thapassu and Bhalluka were from ukkalapada, Utkal or modern state of Orissa, who travelled to different parts in the region, met the Buddha just after his Enlightenment while they were on their way to Rajagaha (Rajgir). They offered the first alms to the Buddha. Taking refuge in the Buddha and the Dhamma they became the first lay disciples of the Buddha. Requesting the Buddha something to worship, the Buddha gave them, eight handfuls of his hair, which he obtained by stroking his head. During their travel they arrived at Thiriyaya (North-East of Sri Lanka) from India. At Thiriyaya, some of the hair relics they brought were enshrined at a Stupa built on top of a mountain which is now called Girihandu Seya. That is considered the first Stupa in Sri Lanka.

=== Myanmar ===
According to the Buddhavaṃsa, Tapussa and Bhallika — two merchant brothers from Ukkalājanapada or modern day Orissa — were passing through Bodh Gaya when they encountered the Buddha. The Buddha, who was at that time enjoying the bliss of his newly attained buddhahood as he sat under a rājāyatana tree, accepted their offering of rice cake and honey and taught them some of the dharma in return. In so doing, they became the first lay disciples to take refuge in the teachings of the Buddha. The Buddha also gave eight strands of his hair to the merchants and gave them instructions on how to construct a stupa in which to enshrine these hair relics. The merchants presented the eight strands of hair to King Okkalapa of Dagon, who enshrined the strands along with some relics of the three preceding Buddhas (Kakusandha, Koṇāgamana, and Kassapa) in the Shwedagon Pagoda on Singuttara Hill, in present-day Myanmar.

== Significance ==
John S. Strong draws attention to Trapusa and Bahalika's legacy of pioneers:

We thus have an important tradition here that brings together several "firsts": first lay disciples of the Buddha to take refuge in him and his teachings; first meritorious food offering to the Buddha after his enlightenment; first Buddhist monk's bowl; first words of dharma given by the Blessed One; first relics of Gautama after his attainment of buddhahood; and first Stupa of the Buddha here on earth.

== See also ==
- Buddhism in Afghanistan
- Pre-Islamic Hindu and Buddhist heritage of Afghanistan
- Buddhism in Pakistan
- Pre-sectarian Buddhism
- Silk Road transmission of Buddhism
- Tripiṭaka
- Vinaya Pitaka
- Nava Vihara
- Stupa
