= Sandakada pahana =

Carved semicircular stone slab in Sinhalese architecture of ancient Sri Lanka

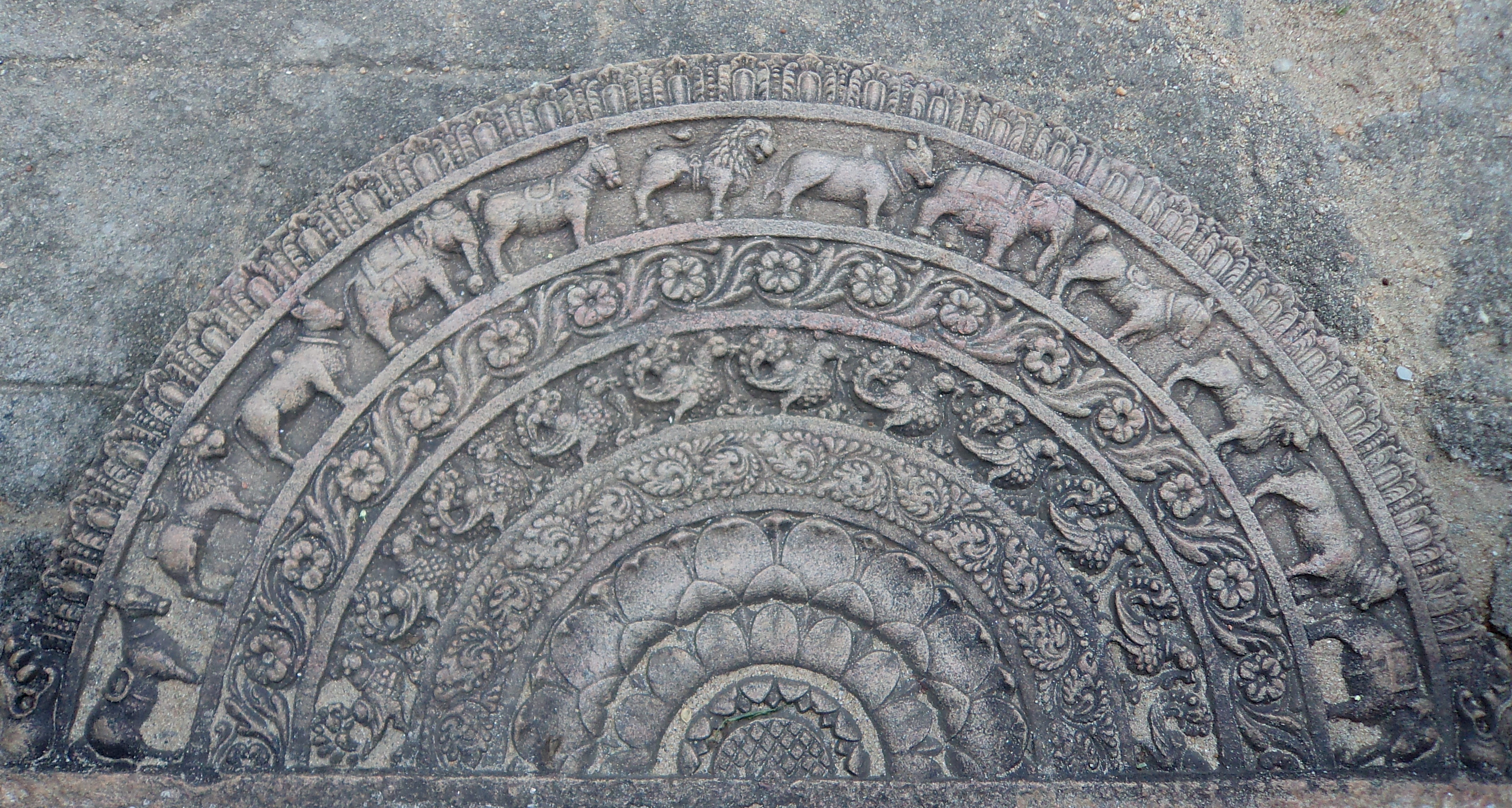
Sandakada Pahana of the Ridi Vihara, built during the Anuradhapura period.

Sandakada Pahana, also known as Moonstone, is a unique feature of the architecture of ancient Sri Lanka. It is an elaborately carved semi-circular stone slab, usually placed at the bottom of staircases and entrances. First seen in the latter stage of the Anuradhapura period, the sandakada pahana evolved through the Polonnaruwa, Gampola and Kandyan period. According to historians, the sandakada pahana symbolises the cycle of samsāra in Buddhism.

Known in Sinhalese as sandakada pahana, it is roughly translated into English as moonstone. The name is based on its shape and design. The ancient chronicle Mahavamsa and Pali chronicles such as the Samantapasadika refer to the sandakada pahana as patika.

== Anuradhapura period ==
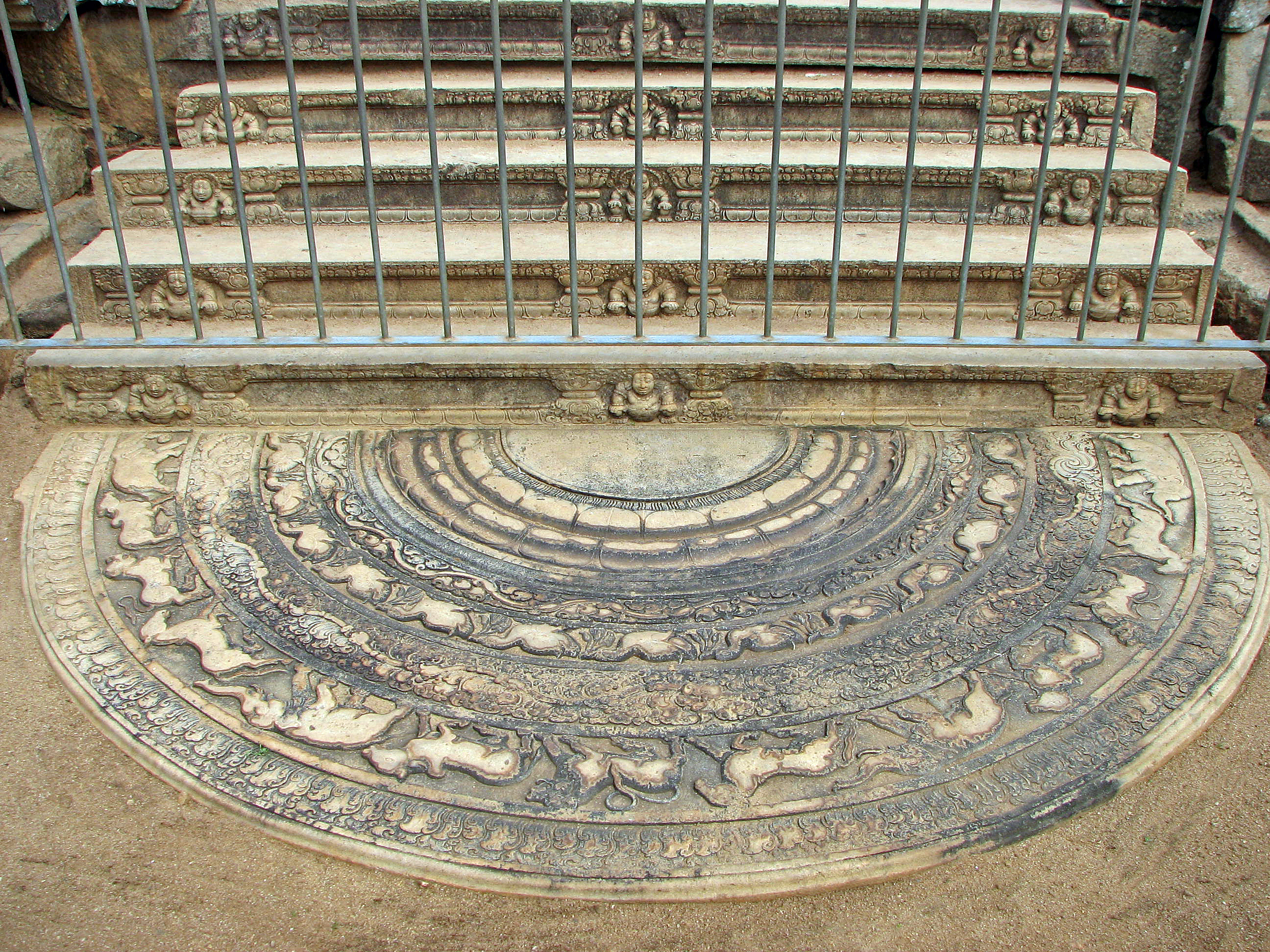
A sandakada pahana of the Anuradhapura period

The first sandakada pahanas were created during the latter stage of the ancient Anuradhapura Kingdom. They were only placed at entrances to Buddhist temples during this period.

The carvings of the semi circular stone slab were the same in every sandakada pahana. A half lotus was carved in the centre, which was enclosed by several concentric bands. The first band from the half lotus is decorated with a procession of swans, followed by a band with an intricate foliage design known as liyavel (creeper) which represents desire. The third band has carvings of four animals; elephants, lions, horses, and bulls. These four animals follow each other in a procession symbolising the four noble truths (chathurarya sathya) or the four stages in life: birth, old age, disease and death. The fourth and outermost band contains a carving of flames, usually interpreted as representing the never ending cycle of life and the pains of passion that the people are experiencing.

Square shaped or rectangular shaped moonstones have also been found dating from this period. The moonstone at Mirisawetiya monastery is an example for a rectangular moonstone. It is thought that the moonstones may have originated as square shaped stones, which later have developed into semicircular ones.

== Polonnaruwa period ==
The design of the sandakada pahana of the Polonnaruwa period differs largely from that of the Anuradhapura period. The single band that was used to depict the four animals was removed, and processions of the elephant, lion and horse were depicted in separate bands. The most significant change is the removal of the bull from the sandakada pahana. This was because in Hinduism the bull is considered as an auspicious animal and during this time of the history the influence of Hinduism was high in Sri Lanka. The Anuradhapura tradition of placing sandakada pahanas only at entrances to Buddhist temples also changed, and they are found at the entrances of other buildings belonging to the Polonnaruwa period as well.

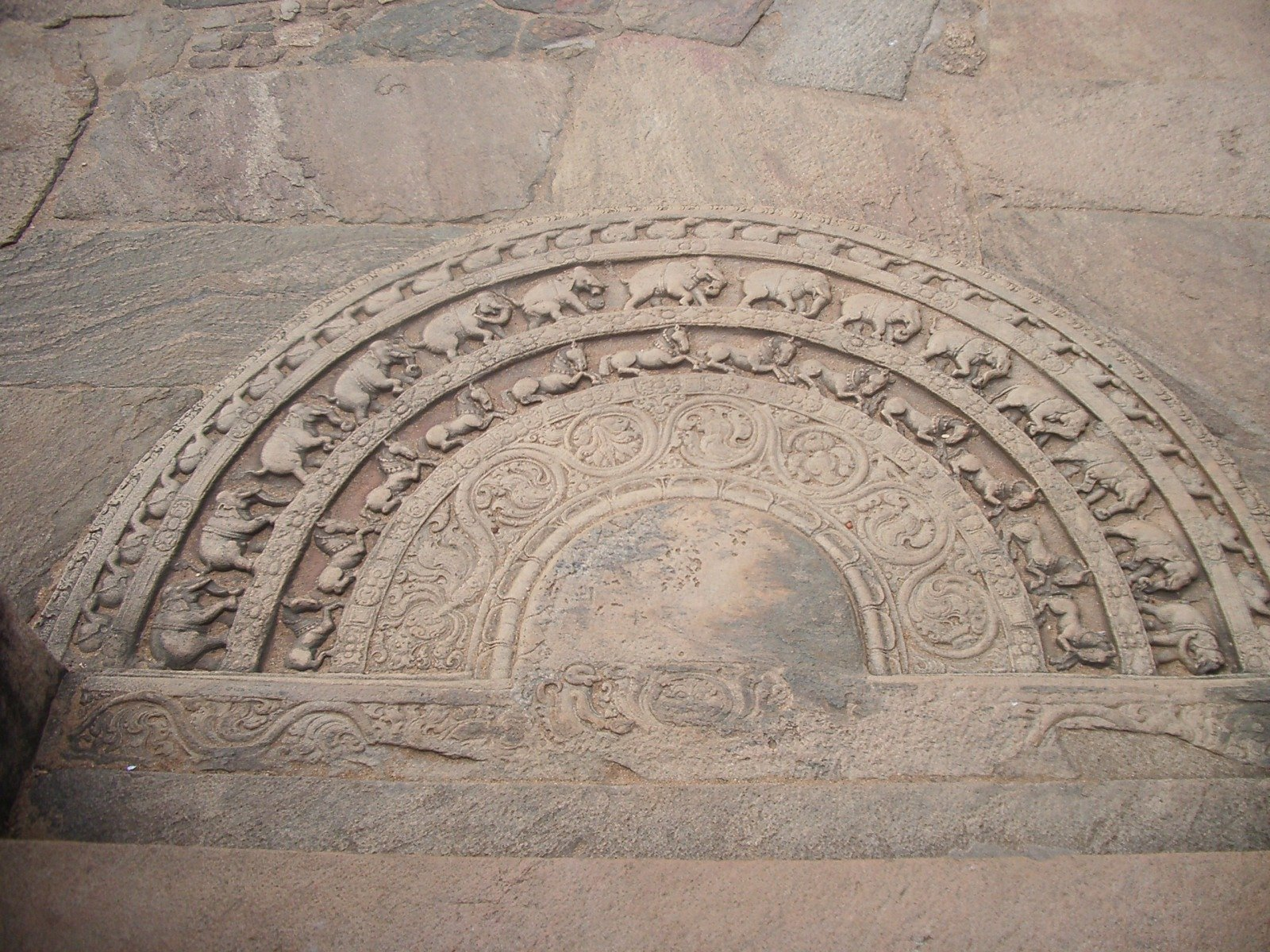
The sandakada pahana at the entrance to the Polonnaruwa Vatadage. Note the absence of the bull and lion.

An invasion by Rajendra I in 1017 AD brought a large part of the country under the control of the Chola Empire. The country was under Chola rule until 1055 AD, and the Sri Lankan culture was heavily influenced by South Indian customs and traditions, including the Hindu religion. Historians believe that the reason for the removal of the bull from the sandakada pahana was because of its connection with Hinduism. The bull, the vehicle of the god Shiva, is a venerated animal in Hinduism, and therefore was removed from the sandakada pahana since it was a place where people tread upon. The lion has also been omitted from some sandakada pahanas. The best specimen of the Sandakada pahanas of the Polonnaruwa period is at the northern entrance of the Polonnaruwa Vatadage.

== Kandy and Gampola periods ==
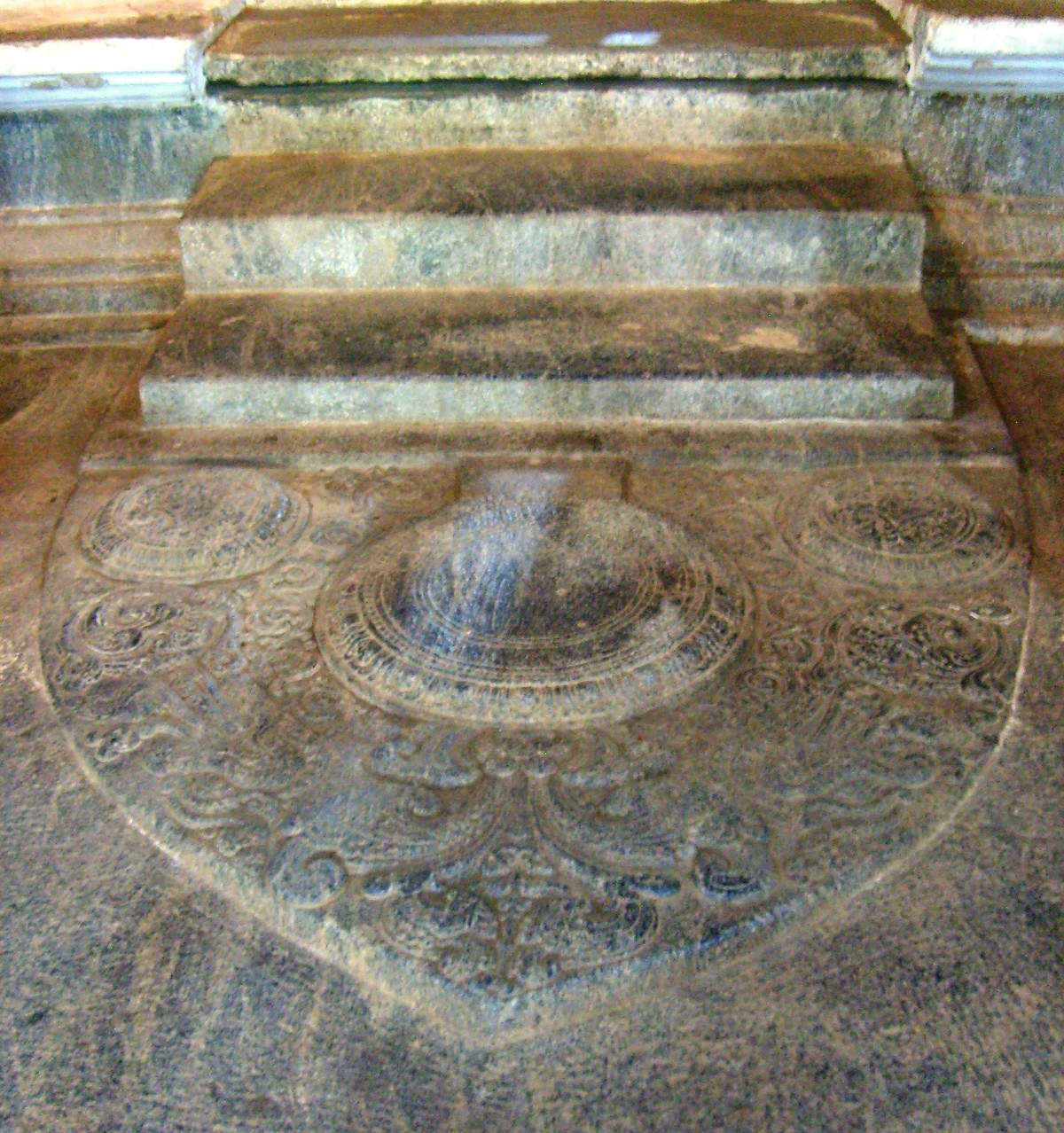
A sandakada pahana of the Kandy period at the Degaldoruwa Raja Maha Vihara.

By the time of the Gampola and Kandyan Kingdoms, the design of the sandakada pahana had changed drastically. The concentric bands were no longer there, and the shape of the once semi circular stone slab had become almost triangular. A lotus was carved in the middle of the stone slab, which was surrounded by an elaborate pattern of liyavel. These moonstones were of less craftsmanship than the moonstones carved during Anuradhapura and Polonnaruwa period.

== Symbolism ==
Historians believe that the carvings of the sandakada pahana symbolise a religious meaning. The widely accepted interpretation is that of historian Senarath Paranavithana. According to Paranavitana, the sandakada pahana symbolises the cycle of saṃsāra. The liyavel symbolise worldly desires (taṇhā) and the lotus depicts the final achievement of nirvana. The elephant, bull, lion and horse depict birth, decay, disease and death respectively. As there is a myth saying that the swans are capable of separating milk from a mixture of water and milk, the swans symbolise the distinction between good and bad.

== Bibliography ==
- Siriweera, W. I. (2004). History of Sri Lanka. Dayawansa Jayakodi & Company. ISBN 955-551-257-4.
- Wijesooriya, S. (2006). A Concise Sinhala Mahavamsa. Participatory Development Forum. ISBN 955-9140-31-0.
- Prematilleke, P. L.; Karunaratne, L. K. (2004). Polonnaruwa - The Silver Capital of Sri Lanka. ISBN 955-613-111-6.
- Sarachchandra, B. S. (1977). අපේ සංස්කෘතික උරුමය (Cultural Heritage) (in Sinhala). Silva, V. P.
- Diganwela, T. (1998). කලා ඉතිහාසය (History of Art) (in Sinhala). Wasana Publishers.
- Bandaranayake, Senake (1974). Sinhalese monastic architecture : the viháras of Anurádhapura. Leiden: Brill. ISBN 90-04-03992-9.
- von Schroeder, Ulrich. (1990). Buddhist Sculptures of Sri Lanka. (Hong Kong: Visual Dharma Publications, Ltd.) ISBN 962-7049-05-0 / ISBN 978-962-7049-05-0
