= Architecture of ancient Sri Lanka =

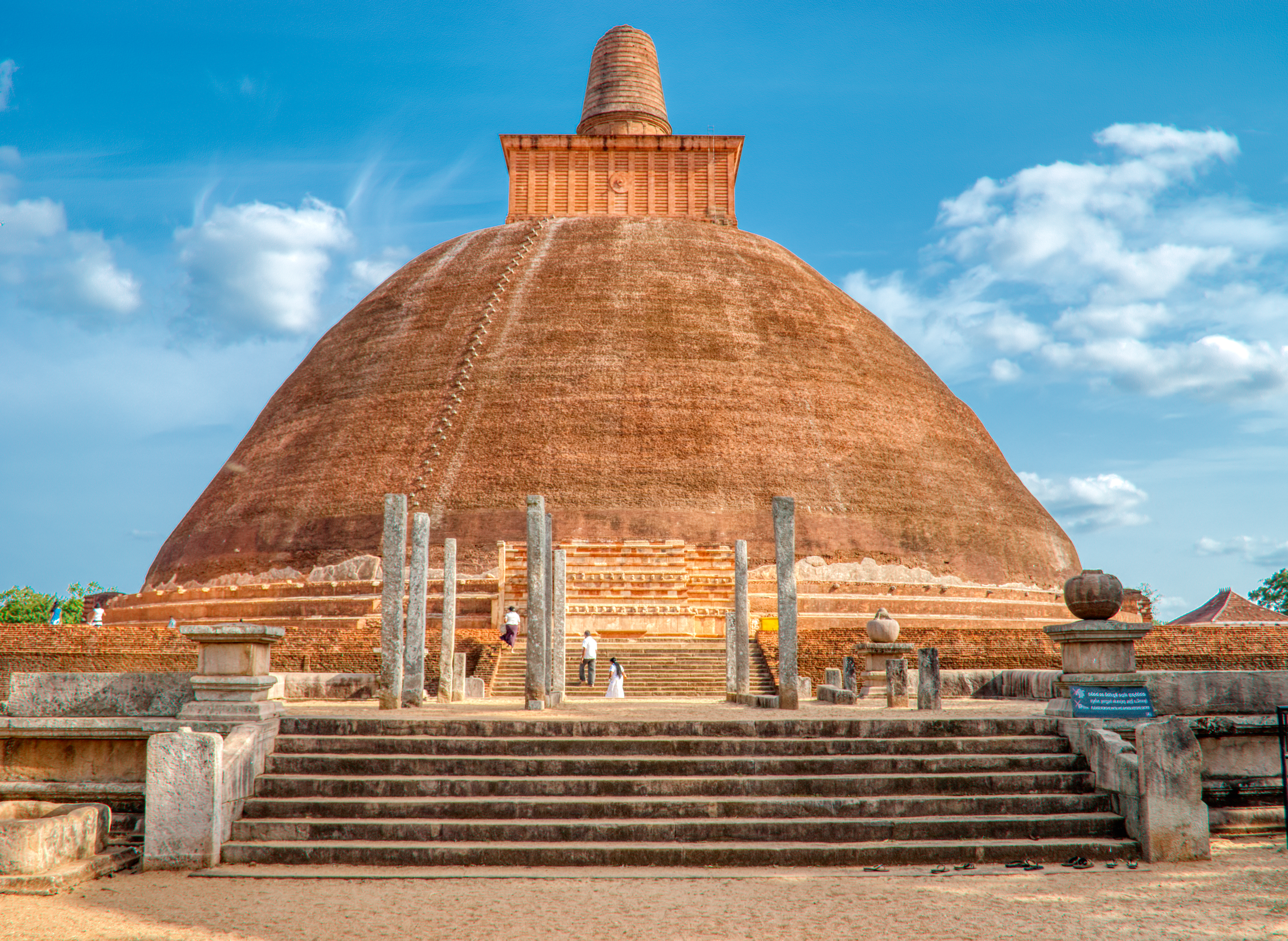

The architecture of ancient Sri Lanka displays a rich diversity, varying in form and architectural style from the Anuradhapura Kingdom (377 BC–1017) through the Kingdom of Kandy (1469–1815). Sinhalese architecture also displays many ancient North Indian influences. Buddhism had a significant influence on Sri Lankan architecture after it was introduced to the island in the 3rd century BC, and ancient Sri Lankan architecture was mainly religious, with more than 25 styles of Buddhist monasteries. Significant buildings include the stupas of Jetavanaramaya and Ruwanvelisaya in the Anuradhapura kingdom and further in the Polonnaruwa kingdom (11th–13th centuries). The palace of Sigiriya is considered a masterpiece of ancient architecture and ingenuity, and the fortress in Yapahuwa and the Temple of the tooth in Kandy are also notable for their architectural qualities. Ancient Sri Lankan architecture is also significant to sustainability, notably Sigiriya which was designed as an environmentally friendly structure.

Monasteries were designed using the Manjusri Vasthu Vidya Sastra, a manuscript which outlines the layout of the structure. The text is in Sanskrit but written in Sinhala script. The script is believed to be from the 5th century, It is exclusively about Buddhist monasteries and is clearly from the Mahayana school. The text shows much originality and there is nothing similar in the existing Indian treatises, which deal only with Hindu temples.

== Buddhist architecture in Sri Lanka ==
=== Cave temples ===
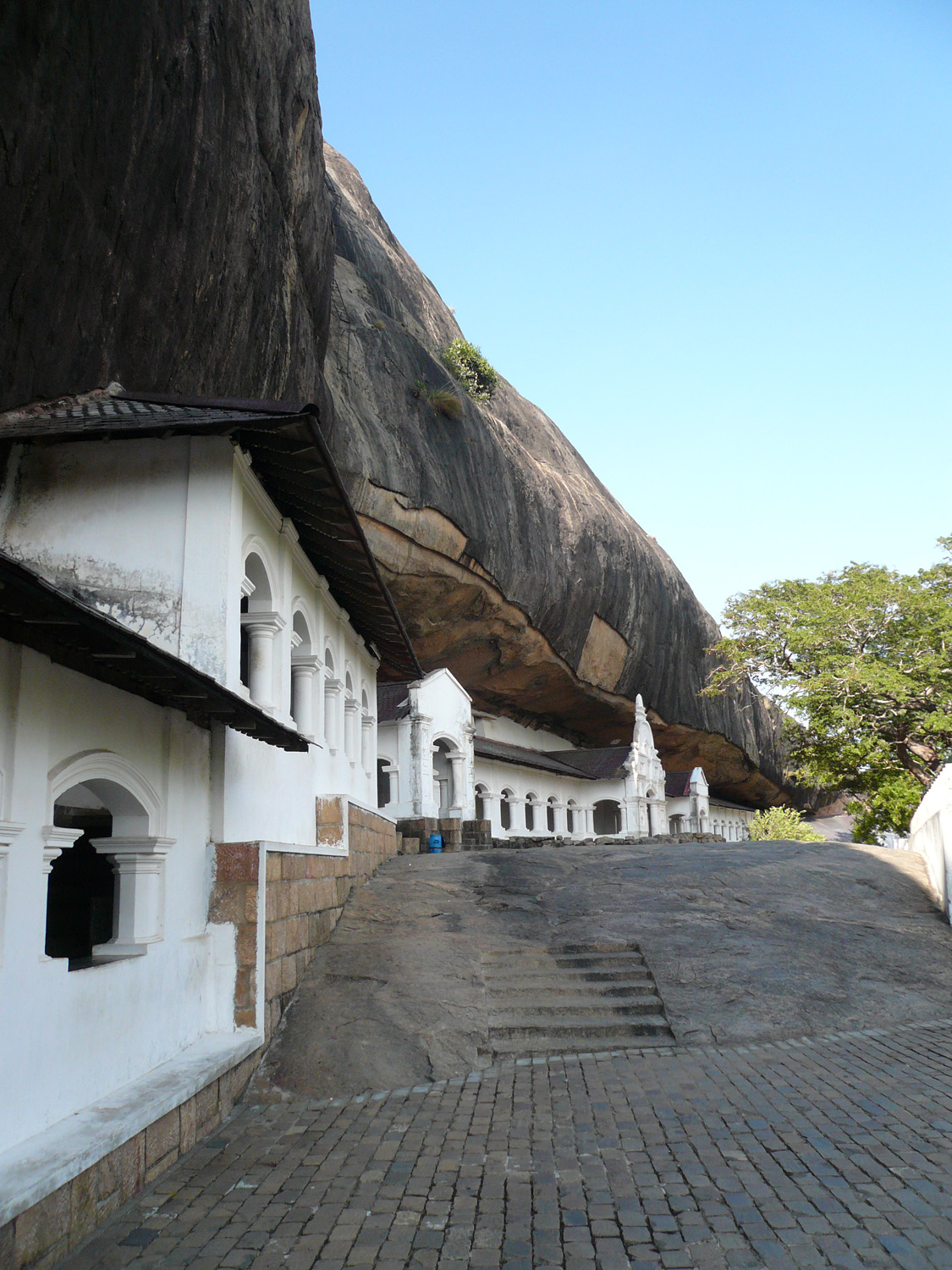
Dambulla Cave Temple

The earliest evidence of rudimentary cave temples are found in Mihintale, a unique feature in these caves was the use of a drip ledge (kataraya) carved along the top edge of the rock ceiling which stopped rain water running into the cave. With time doors, windows and walls of brick or stone were added. The roof and walls were plastered white and finished with decorative paintings, these are evident in the cave temples of Dambulla.

Cave complexes of Dambulla, Situlpahuwa, Mulkirigala are significant cave temples which demonstrate rudimentary architectural developments of the island. The Kaludiya Pokuna, Mihintale cave temple was constructed with brick walls, granite window openings, and ceilings. The Gal vihara, Polonnaruwa and the cave temples of Dambulla were initially constructed as cave temples, later on the cave temples were converted to image houses.

=== Dagobas or stupas ===
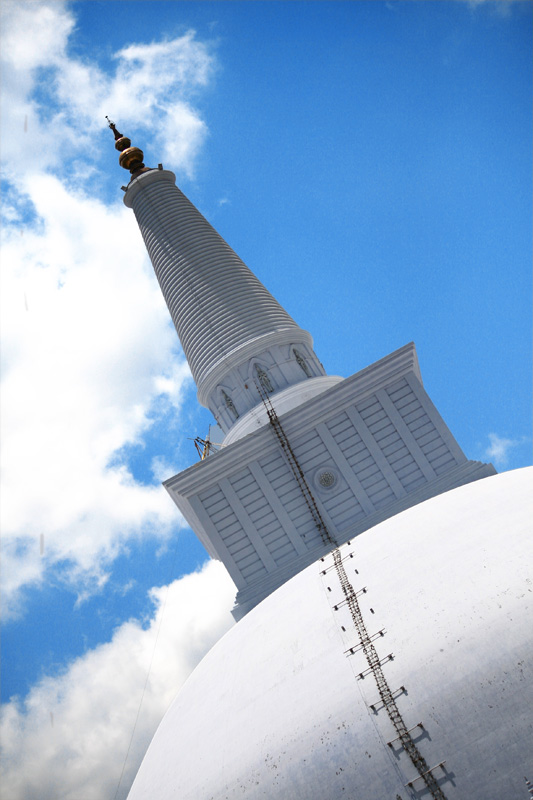
Ruwanveliseya, Anuradhapura

The dagobas or stupas of Sri Lanka are significant to the architectural and engineering development in the island, stupas designed and constructed in Sri Lanka are the largest brick structures known to the pre-modern world. Demala Maha Seya, which was never completed, had a circumference of 2,011 feet (613 m), Jetavanaramaya at the time of its completion was the largest stupa constructed in any part of the world at 122 m in height. Jetavanaramaya was also the third tallest building in the ancient world, Abhayagiri Dagaba (370 ft) and Ruwanwelisaya (300 ft) were also significant constructions of the ancient world.

The construction of stupas were considered acts of great merit, the purpose of stupas were mainly to enshrine relics of Buddha. The design specifications are consistent within most of the stupas, entrances to stupas are laid out so that their centre lines point to the relic chambers. Stupa design it is admired for its structural perfection and stability, stupas such as Jetavanarama, Abhayagiri, and Mirisaveti Stupa were in the shape of a paddy heap. Other shapes such as the bubble(Ruwanweli), pot and bell developed later, it is suggested that the stupa at Nadigamvila was in the shape of an onion.

An ornamented vahalkada was added to stupa design around the 2nd century; the earliest is at Chaitya. The four vahalkadas face the cardinal points, ornamented with figures of animals, flowers, swans and dwarfs. The pillars on either side of the vahalkada carry figures of lions, elephants, horses or bulls, depending on the direction of the structure.

The stupas were covered with a coating of lime plaster, plaster combinations changed with the requirements of the design, items used included lime, clay, sand, pebbles, crushed seashells, sugar syrup, white of egg, coconut water, plant resin, drying oil, glues and saliva of white ants. The fine plaster at Kiri Vehera used small pebbles, crushed seashells mixed with lime and sand were used in the stupas from the 5th to 12th centuries.

=== Vatadage ===
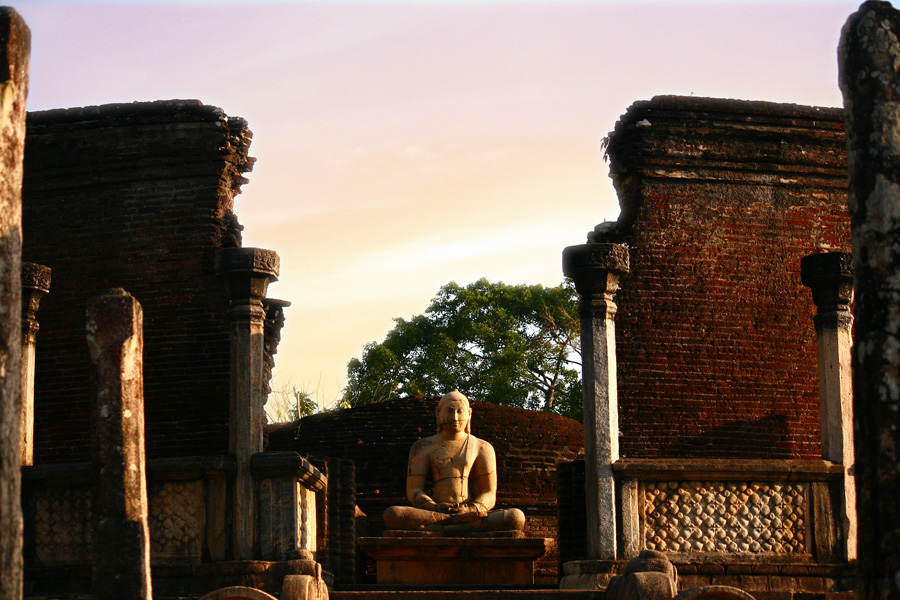
Vatadage, Polonnaruwa

The vatadage is considered to be one of ancient Sri Lanka's most prolific architectural creations; this design represented a changing perspective of stupa design independently within the island. Early provincial vatadages have been in the form of a square later it developed into a circular form enclosing the dagoba. Polonnaruwa, Medirigiriya and Tiriyaya vatadages still have their circles of slender, graceful pillars. The vatadage roof was of a sophisticated design unique to ancient Sri Lanka, it is a three-tiered conical roof, spanning a height of 12–15 m, without a centre post, and supported by pillars of diminishing height. The weight was taken by a ring beam supported on the inner row of stone columns, the radiating rafters met in a cartwheel-like design. The ornamental qualities of the Polonnaruwa vatadage are highly valued and scholars maintain that the Polonnaruwa vatadage represents the best architectural work of the Polonnaruwa period.

=== Meditation houses ===
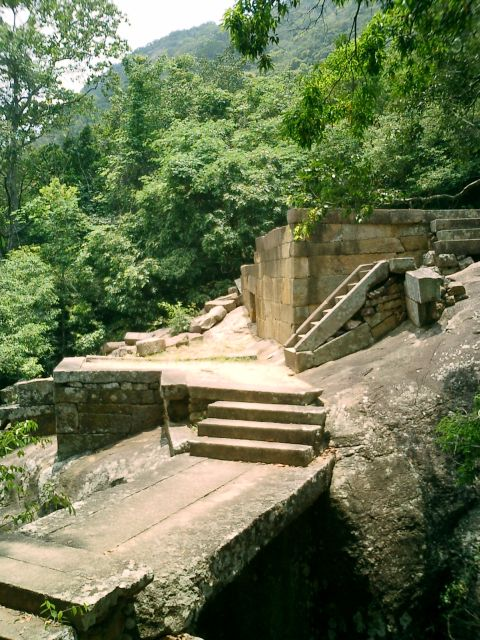
Ritigala Ruins

The meditation houses found in the forest monasteries in Ritigala and Arankele are unique to Sri Lanka, Each house consist of two raised platforms, linked to each other by a monolithic stone bridge. The outer platform is open to the sky, larger and higher than the inner platform. These meditation houses achieved a very high degree of perfection in their architecture, the design combined square and rectangular shapes and yet maintained symmetry, indicating the architects' sophisticated knowledge of geometry. The stone masonry is also of a very high standard. The basements of these buildings were constructed of monumental blocks of stone, cut to different sizes, carefully dressed and very finely fitted together. The bridge connecting the two platforms was formed out of a single slab of stone. Some such slabs measured 15 feet (5 m) by 13 feet (4 m). The sides have been cut with precision where the joints between the slab and the stone moulding of the platforms are hardly perceptible.

=== Vaulted roof shrine ===
The brick shrine with vaulted roof, as seen at Thuparama, Lankatilaka and Tivanka Pilimage, is also considered unique to Sri Lanka. The Thuparama is almost intact today and gives an idea of the manner in which the vaulted roof was created. The principles of the true arch were known to the ancient Sri Lankans, but the horizontal arch was considered a safer method of construction.

== Skyscrapers ==
The nine-storied Lovamahapaya (3rd century BCE) would have been an elegant building. It had an exposed wooden frame supported on stone pillars. It was plastered in white, with shining copper roof tiles and a pinnacle at its apex. It had lightning conductors or chumbakam made of amber and tourmaline. Its rafters were made of talipot palm. It rose to a height of 162 feet (49 m) and had approximately 179,316 square feet (16,659 m^{2}) of floor space. It could seat 9000 monks. Roland Silva remarked in 1984 that such an extensive floor space would stagger the designers in Sri Lanka "even today". The dominant element in these buildings, was the tiled roof supported by timber beams and rafters. The roofs were tiled, from as early as the 3rd century BCE, with red, white, yellow, turquoise and brown tiles. There were also tiles made of bronze.

== Palaces ==
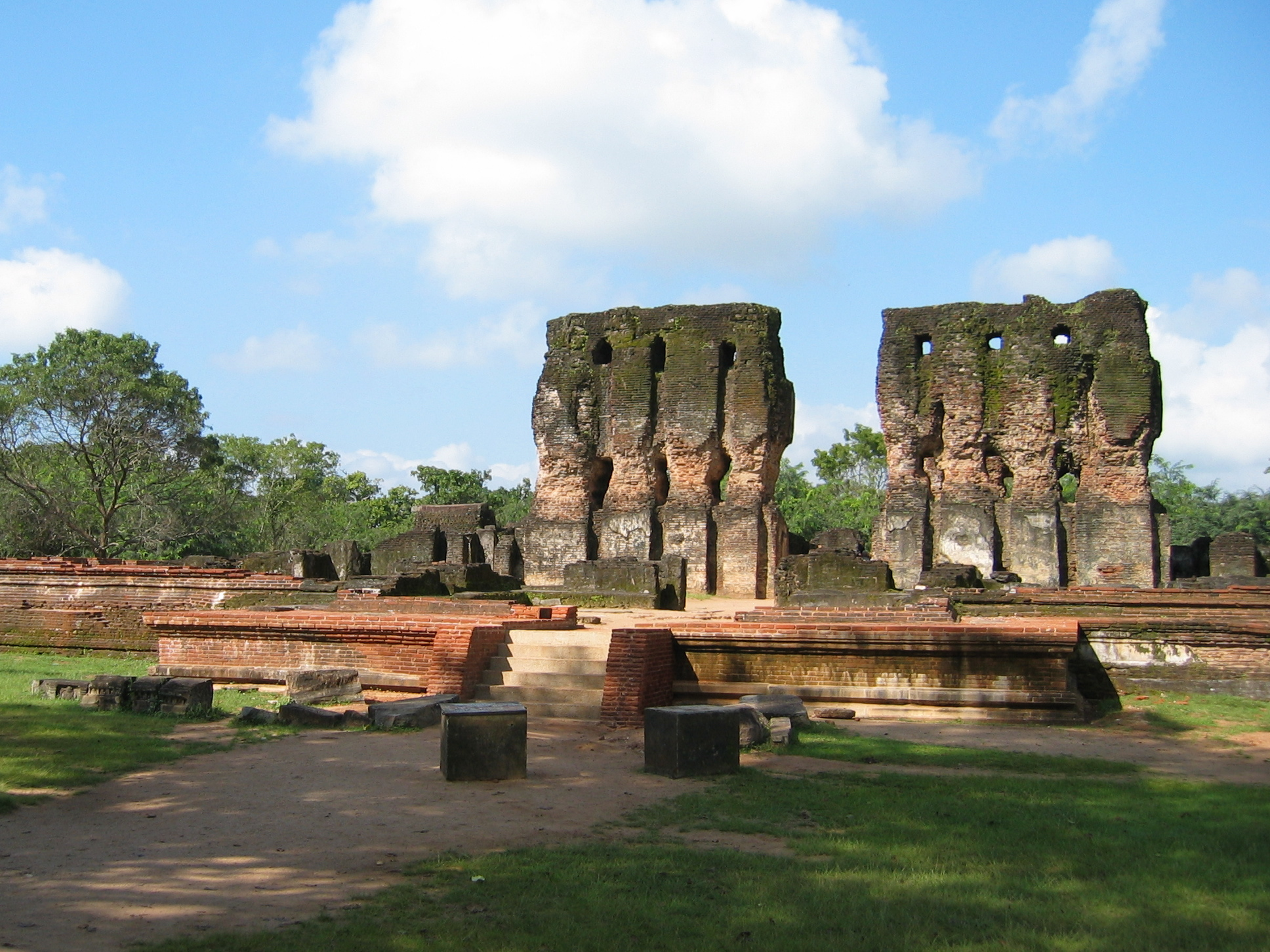
A Royal Palace in Polonnaruwa

Five royal residences have been identified. They are Vijayabahu's palace in the inner city at Anuradhapura, the palaces of Nissanka Malla and Parakramabahu in Polonnaruwa, the palace of Sugala in Galabadda in the Uva province, and Parakramabahu's palace in Panduwasnuwara near Hettipola, when he was ruling over Malaya rata.

Ground plan All the palaces had the same ground plan. Each was set in a rectangular area enclosed by galleries with an entrance from the east. A spacious courtyard in front acted as a reception room, where sitting was not allowed. A flight of steps led to a central building where there was an imposing pillared hall with a dais at the end. Around the royal complex were over fifty small cells, in two or three rows. The hall in Nissanka Malla's palace was 133 feet (41 m) by 63 feet (19 m). The floors of the upper storey in Parakramabahu's palace were of concrete. [Panduwasnuwara] palace had good provision for ventilation and there were soakage pits for drainage.

=== Rock Palaces ===
There was a palace on top of Sigiriya rock as well. The outlines, layout and several detailed features of this Sky Palace are still visible. There was an upper palace that ran parallel to the lower one, but at a much higher elevation. It had a viewing gallery. The innermost royal abode, which was originally a storeyed structure, had a magnificent 360 degree view of the city gardens and countryside below. There was a series of successive courtyards, chambers, and terraces connected by stairs and paved pathways.

== Pool design ==
Kuttam Pokuna in Anuradhapura provides one of the best examples of the construction of a royal bath. A flight of long narrow steps led to an oblong shaped pond that had graduated gangways. The water was conducted by underground pipelines from the canal nearby and led into the bath by two makara gargoyles. A stone water lock acted as water locking valve and an exit for used water. There is also a now-ruined changing room. Other magnificent pool designs in Anuradhapura era such as "Twin Ponds" Kuttam Pokuna, "lotus Pond" Nelum pokuna, "hot water pond" janthagara Pokona, ath Pokuna-built for water storage and "black water pool" Kaludiya Pokuna are significant. Also there are significant series of ponds and pools which contains water fountains at the Sigiriya citadel, which marvels the hydro engineering in the ancient Sri Lanka.

== Audience halls ==
Polonnaruwa also has the remains of two magnificent audience halls. They are the public audience halls of Parakramabahu and council chamber of Nissanka Malla. Parakramabahu's council chamber was a three-tiered oblong structure built on a broad terrace, facing north, and consisted of an entrance provided with two flights of steps, having a gangway in between at ground level. The pillars in the council halls at Polonnaruwa are square at the bottom, octagonal in the middle and square again at the top.

== Hospitals ==
Some idea of hospital architecture can be inferred from the monastic hospitals at Mihintale and Polonnaruwa. This hospital plan can be seen at the National Museum, Colombo. There was an inner and outer court and the rectangular inner court had a series of cells, toilets and bath, with an exit at one end. One cell had a medicinal bath. Alahena had long dormitories instead of cells. The outer court accommodated a refectory, a hot water bath, storerooms and dispensary. A wall cordoned off the hospitals. The provision of two open courts in addition to windows ensured maximum ventilation and free circulation of air within the building itself.

== Houses ==
A house dated to 450 BCE, built of warichchi (wattle and daub) has been discovered near Kirindi oya. Another has been found at Adalla, Wirawila, and at Valagampattu evidence has been discovered of houses dating from 50 CE to 400 CE. The kitchen utensils are still there. In medieval times, the rich had large houses built of stone, mortar and lime, with tiled roofs and whitewashed walls. There were rooms and apartments with doors and windows. The windows had fanlights. The doors had keys, locks, and hinges. The houses had compounds or courtyards and balconies. There were separate rooms for pounding paddy, a storeroom or atuva for paddy, and sheds for keeping chariots. Latrines are also mentioned. All houses however had small kitchens.

== Design and construction ==
=== Architects ===
There were architects to attend to the built environment. A cave inscription refers to a "city architect". Building was done scientifically, using superior instruments. For example, some stone slabs were so precisely cut that the joints are hardly visible and nothing could be inserted between the slabs. Ashley de Vos points out that this would require sophisticated instruments even today. Lifting and placing of slender stone slabs, twenty feet long, would have needed knowledge of structural mechanics. De Vos also suggests that Sri Lanka may have had the first pre-fabricated buildings in the world. Some sections of the monastic buildings were prepared separately and then fitted together.

=== Artistry ===
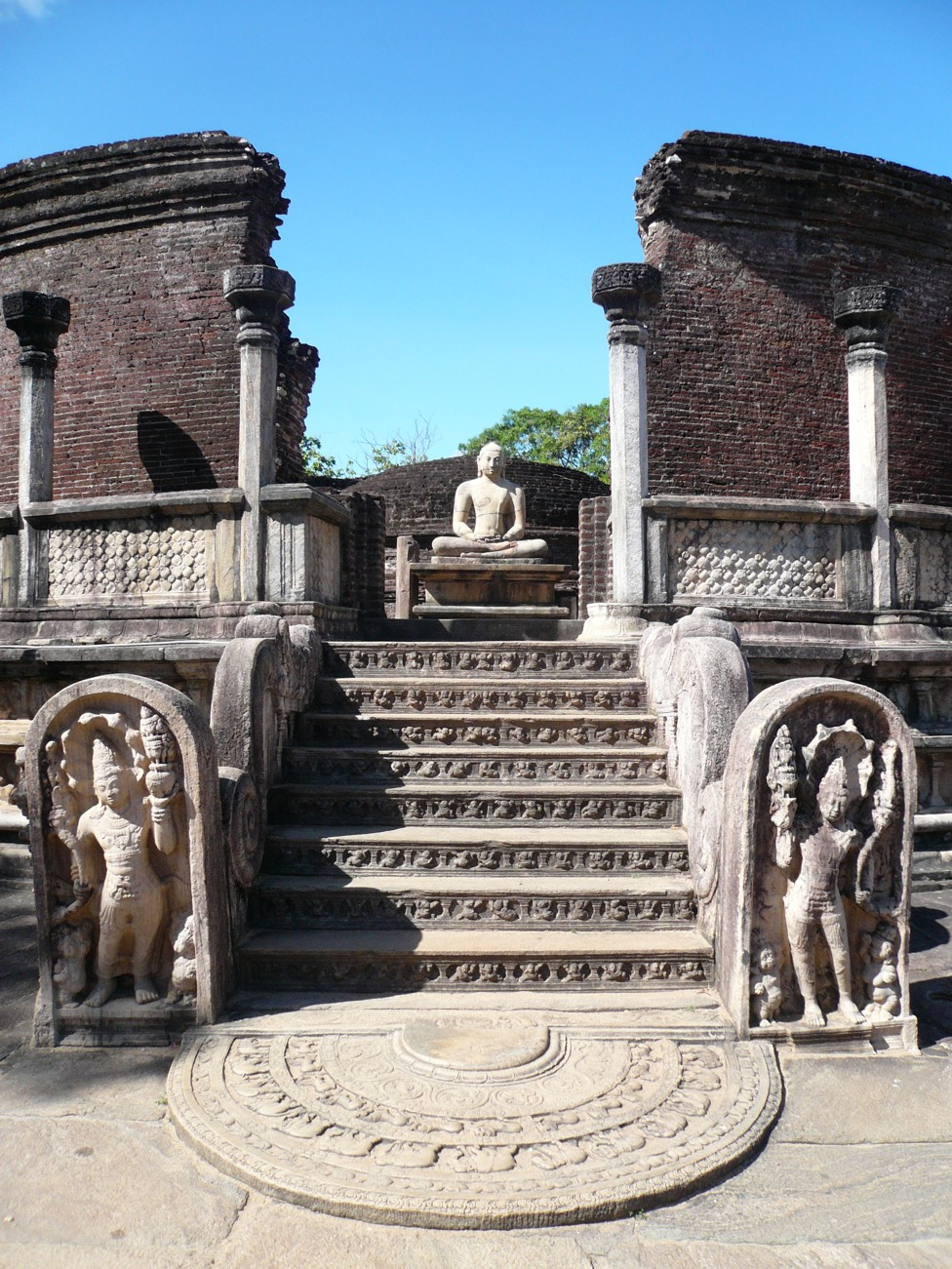
Vatadage Temple, Polonnaruwa, with fine examples of carvings

There was artistry in addition to technical finesse. This is illustrated in the elegantly executed stone pillars dating from the 8th century. They are in various designs. The lotus-stalk pillars of the Nissanka Latha Mandapaya are unique in South Asian architecture. Lime mortar was used in brickwork only when there was a structural risk such as a vault or an arch.

=== Water ===
There were island pavilions surrounded by water called Sitala Maligawa. There were ponds with lotuses. The royal gardens in Polonnaruwa had dozens of individually named ponds in different shapes and sizes. Sigiriya had an octagonal pond. Polonnaruwa had one resembling the coils of a serpent and another like an open lotus. Kuttam Pokuna in Anuradhapura had a graduated series of ponds going from shallow to deep. Essential facilities were not forgotten: the Nandana Gardens had a large gleaming bathroom.

=== Air cooling ===
There was an air cooling method in the ancient period. A dried buffalo skin was fixed above the roof of the building. Water dripped onto it from several pipes, creating the effect of rain and sending in a cooling breeze. Pictures on walls were changed according to the season; cooling pictures for the hot season and warming pictures for the cool season.

=== Building materials ===
Builders worked with a variety of materials, such as brick, stone and wood. Corbelled and circular brick arches, vaults and domes were constructed. Rock faces were used as supporting walls for buildings. The platform carrying the mirror wall at Sigiriya and the brick flight of steps stand on steep rock. Around the 6th century, the builders had moved from limestone to the harder gneiss. The vatadage in Polonnaruwa had walls that were constructed of stone to the height of the upper storey. The lowest step of an imposing granite stairway that led to the upper storey of Parakramabahu's palace can still be seen. Meticulous detailing had been done in the leaf huts used by the forest monks of the 5th century.

==== Timber ====
The ancient architecture was not stone architecture. The stone remains seen are misleading. It was primarily timber architecture, with mud or masonry walls. There were sophisticated wooden buildings from the 3rd century. Sigiriya had an elaborate gatehouse made of timber and brick masonry with multiple tiled roofs. The massive timber doorposts remaining today indicate this.

The timber carried the load. Frames were made out of whole trunks of trees. The gatehouse at the eastern entrance to Anuradhapura built in the 4th century BC used whole trees. The palaces at Polonnaruwa and Panduwasnuwara show vertical crevices in the brickwork where wooden columns, consisting of entire trunks of trees, carried the load of the upper floors and roof. These openings still retain the spur stones upon which the wooden column once stood.

The text of the Manjusri silpa describes methods for the cutting and seasoning of wood. Mature trees were selected and cut in the new moon when the sugar content in timber was lower, so that destructive woodboring insects were not attracted to the timber. The stone remains show that sound carpentry techniques were employed. The axe, adze and chisel were the common tools used in timber work. Saddharmarat-navali mentions two practices of carpentry. Oil was applied to timber to prevent decay, and wood was heated to straighten it.

== See also ==
- Architecture of Sri Lanka
