= Kataraya =

Katâraya (Sinhala: කටාරය) are a unique feature of monastic caves (guhā-vihāra) and cave temples in Sri Lanka. It refers to a drip line or ledge carved around the mouth of a cave shelter to preserve the interiors and meditating monks from rainwater.

This ledge protected the interior of the cave from rain water runoff flowing down the external face of the rock. The donor's name or religious inscriptions were often carved on the face of this ledge. These inscriptions have then been used to date when the temples were established. The earliest cave temples have been dated to the Anuradhapura period, around the 2nd century CE. Immediately below the kataraya, a timber framed, terra-cotta tiled, lean-to roof supported on carved wooden pillars or stone columns (kuluna) with wooden brackets (pekada) forming a protected walkway or verandah (pilla) would be erected.

R. L. Brohier in his 1973 work, Discovering Ceylon described it as being a "primeval gutter serving as a run-off for the rain which would otherwise trickle down the rock to its base, making the cave inhabitable during the wet season of the year."
