= Lankarama =

Coordinates: 8°22′N 80°23′E

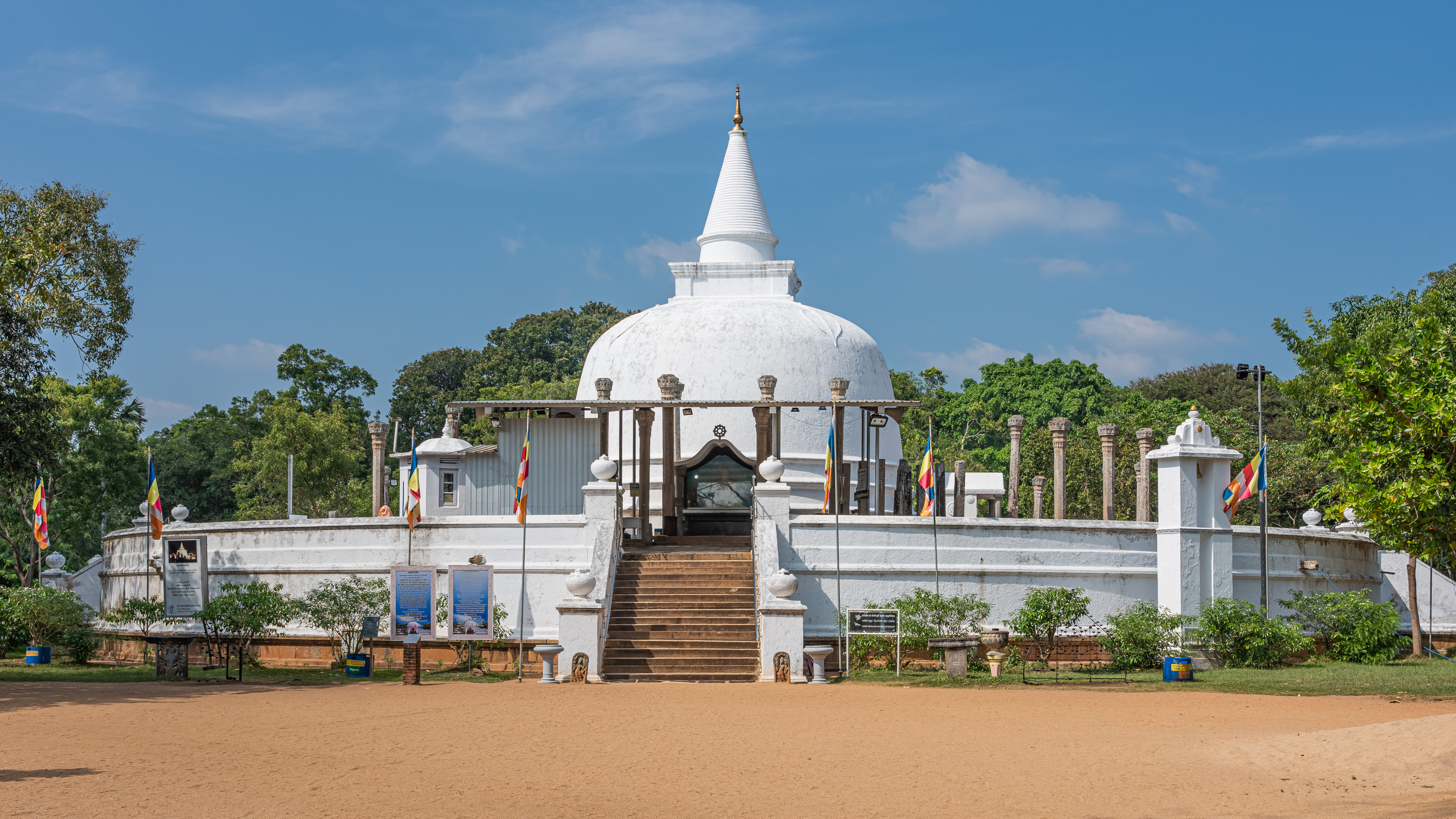
The Lankarama dagoba.

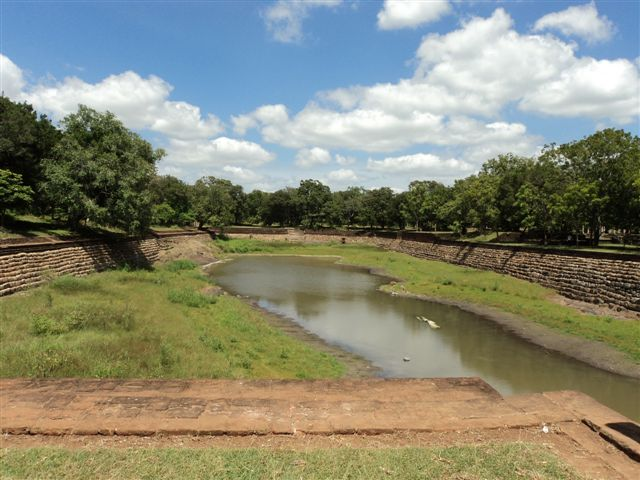
Eth Pokuna (Elephant pond).

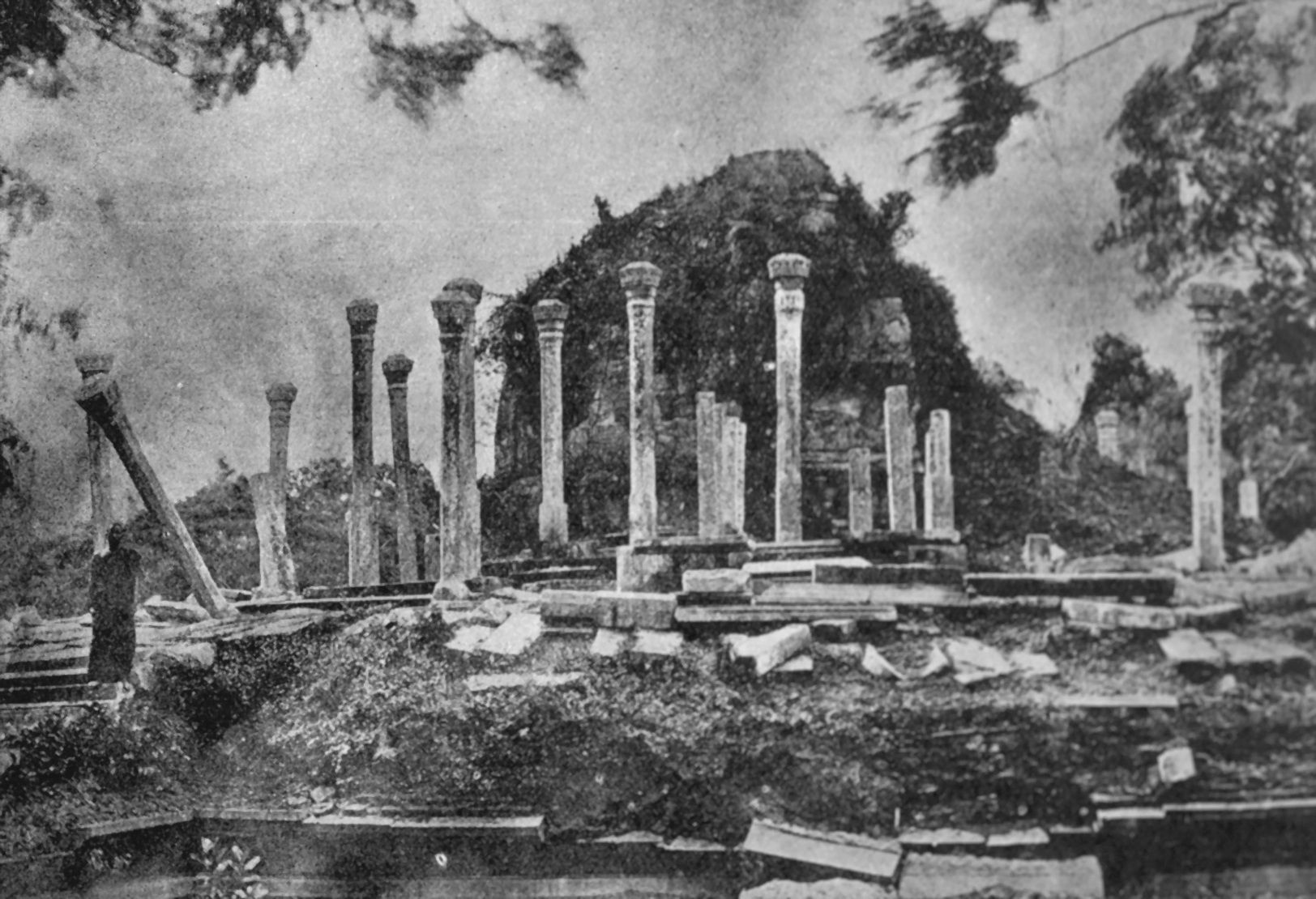
Lankarama in a dilapidated state 1927.

Lankarama is a stupa built by King Valagamba, in an ancient place at Galhebakada in the ancient kingdom of Anuradhapura, Sri Lanka. Nothing is known about the ancient form of the stupa, and later this was renovated. The ruins show that there are rows of stone pillars and it is no doubt that there has been a house built encircling the stupa (vatadage) to cover it. The round courtyard of the stupa seems to be 3.0 metres (10 ft) above the ground. The diameter of the stupa is 14 metres (45 ft). The courtyard is circular in shape and the diameter is 406 metres (1,332 ft).

== Eth pokuna ==
The eth pokuna (elephant pond) is an ancient man-made pond situated close to Lankaramaya. It is 159 metres (522 ft) in length, 52.7 metres (173 ft) in width and 9.5 metres (31 ft) deep, with a holding capacity of 75,000 m^{3} (2,600,000 cu ft) of water.

The water to this pond is supplied from the Periyamkulama Tank through a network of underground canals. These underground canals still work after several hundreds years. This tank was probably used by the monks in the Abhayagiri vihāra (Buddhist monastery), which at one time had over five thousand priests.

== See also ==
- Atamasthana
