= Thuparamaya =

Buddhist Temple in Sri Lanka

- ථූපාරාමය
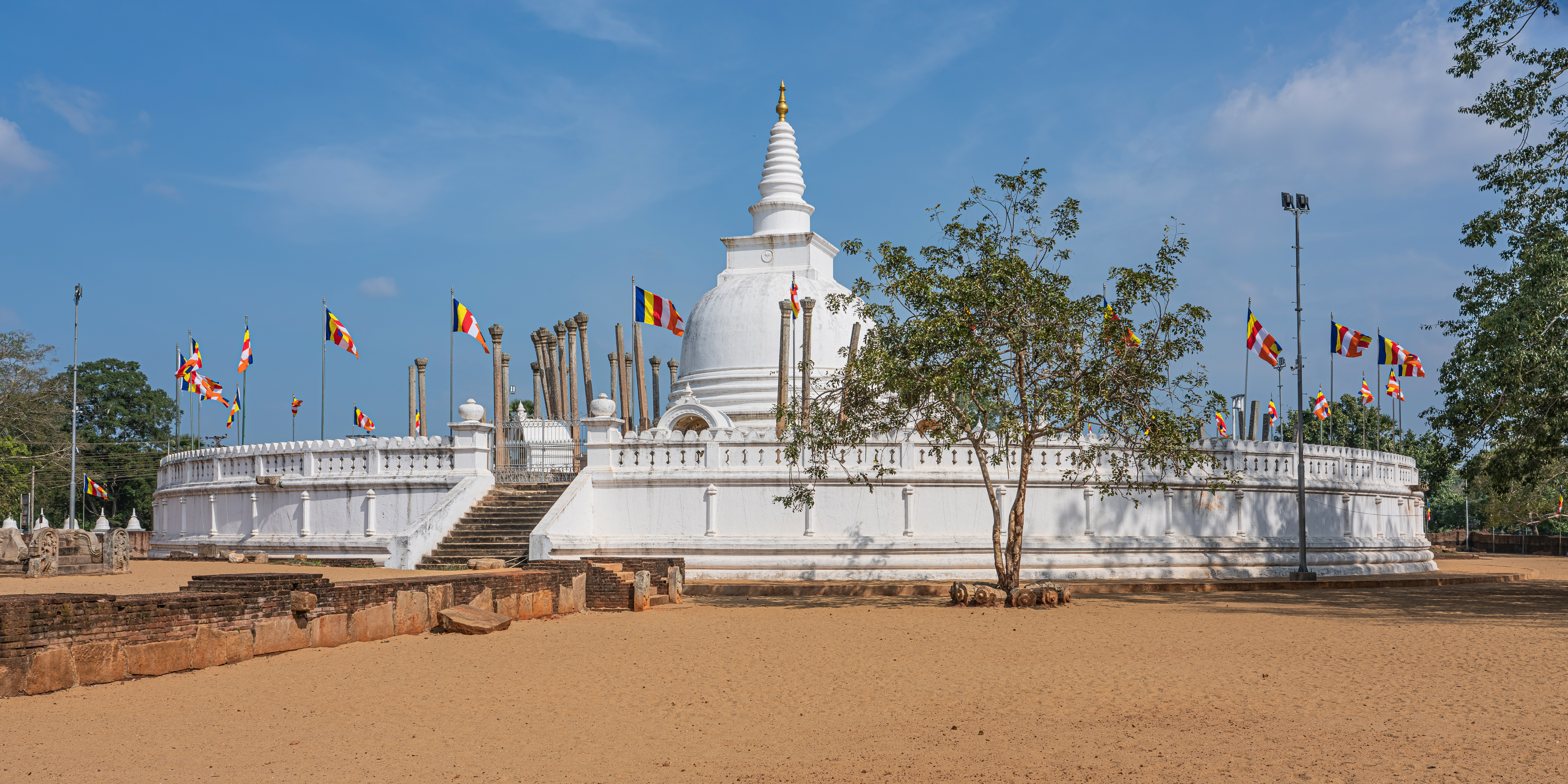
- The Stupa

- Location within Sri Lanka

Religion
- Affiliation: Theravada Buddhism
- District: Anuradhapura
- Province: North Central Province
- Region: Anuradhapura

Location
- Location: Anuradhapura
- Country: Sri Lanka
- Coordinates: 8°21′19″N 80°23′46″E

Architecture
- Type: Buddhist Temple
- Founder: King Devanampiya Tissa (247-207 BC)

Specifications
- Width: 18 m (59 ft)
- Height (max): 50.1 m

Thuparamaya is the earliest documented Buddhist temple in Sri Lanka. Its building dates to the arrival of Mahinda Thera (Mahindagamanaya) and the introduction of Buddhism to the island.

Located within the sacred precinct of Mahamewna park, the Thuparamaya Stupa is the earliest Dagoba to be constructed on the island, dating back to the reign of King Devanampiya Tissa (247-207 BC). The temple has been recognised by the Government and listed as a protected archaeological site in Sri Lanka.

== History ==
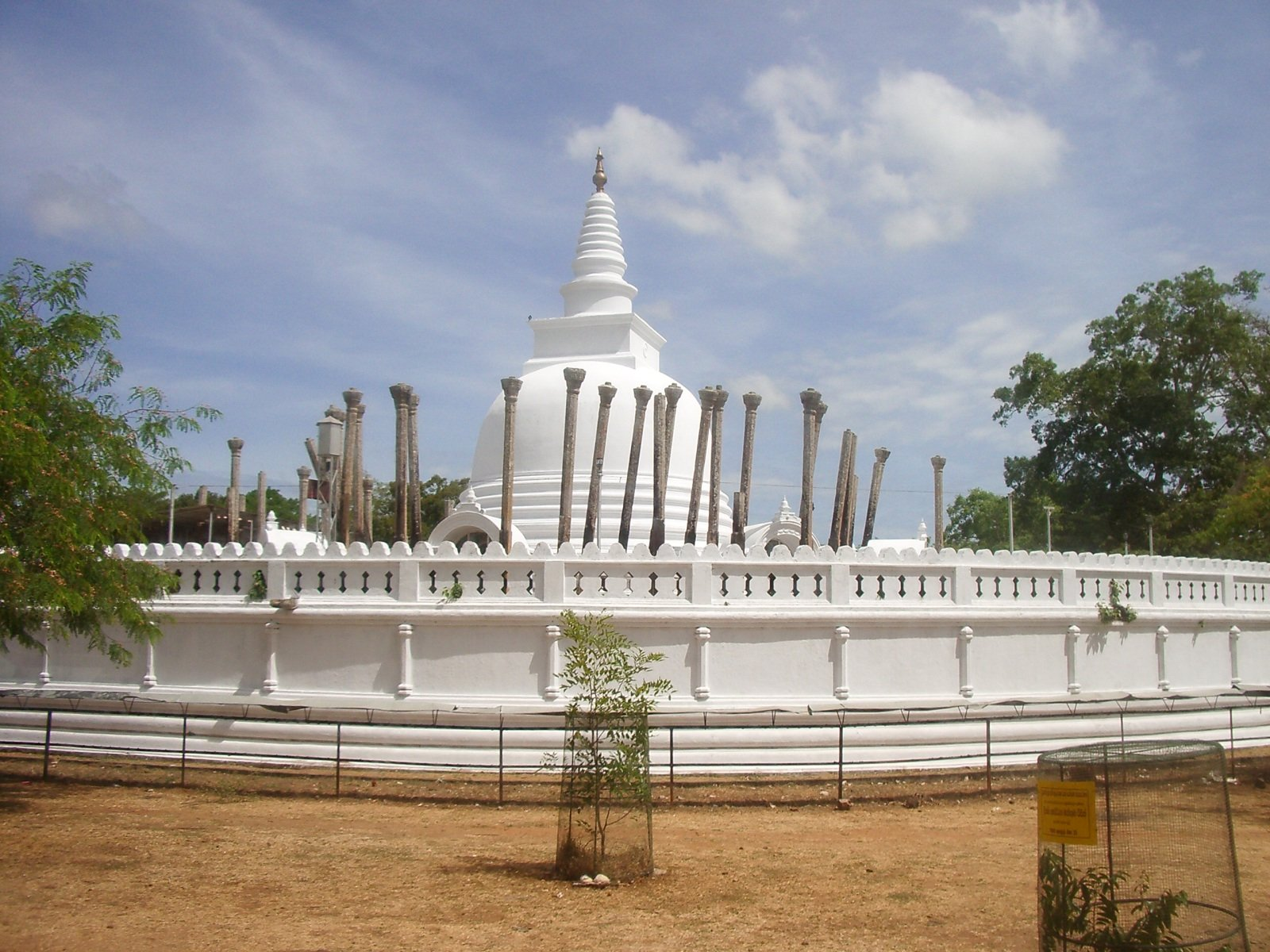
Stone pillars around the Stupa suggest that a Vatadage with a conical roof once sheltered the Stupa at the center of the covered space

Thuparamaya is closely linked to Mahinda Thera, the envoy sent by King Ashoka to Sri Lanka, bringing Theravada Buddhism and Chaitya worship to the island. At Mahinda's request, King Devanampiya Tissa built Thuparamaya to enshrine the right collar-bone of the Buddha, thus the claim to be the first stupa built in Sri Lanka. It also marks the formal arrival of Buddhism. The name Thuparamaya comes from "stupa" and "aramaya" which is a residential complex for monks.

According to the Palumekichchawa Inscription, the tank called Madamanaka (Palumekichchawa Wewa) at Upala Vibajaka area had been constructed at a cost of 5000 Kahavanu and donated on behalf of the Bhikkus who were living at the Thuparama temple. It further states that the harvest from the paddy fields surrounding the tank was presented to the Bhikkus at the temple. The inscription is the earliest chiseled stone inscription in which the name of the Thuparama temple is inscribed and said to belong to the reign of King Gajabahu (114-136 A.D.).

== The Stupa ==
Thuparamaya dagoba was built in the shape of a bell. This dagoba was destroyed from time to time. By the reign of King Aggabodhi II the site was in ruins and was fully restored by royal edict. The current construction of the dagoba dates to the 1842 rebuilding. As of the 21st century after repeated renovations over centuries, the monument has a diameter of 59 ft (18 m), at the base. The dome is raised on a plinth 11 feet 4 inches (3.45 m) off the ground, and the entire structure is 164 1/2 ft (50.1 m) in diameter. The compound is paved with granite with two rows of stone pillars ringing the dagoba. These are remnants of the roofed vatadage once built over Thuparamaya.

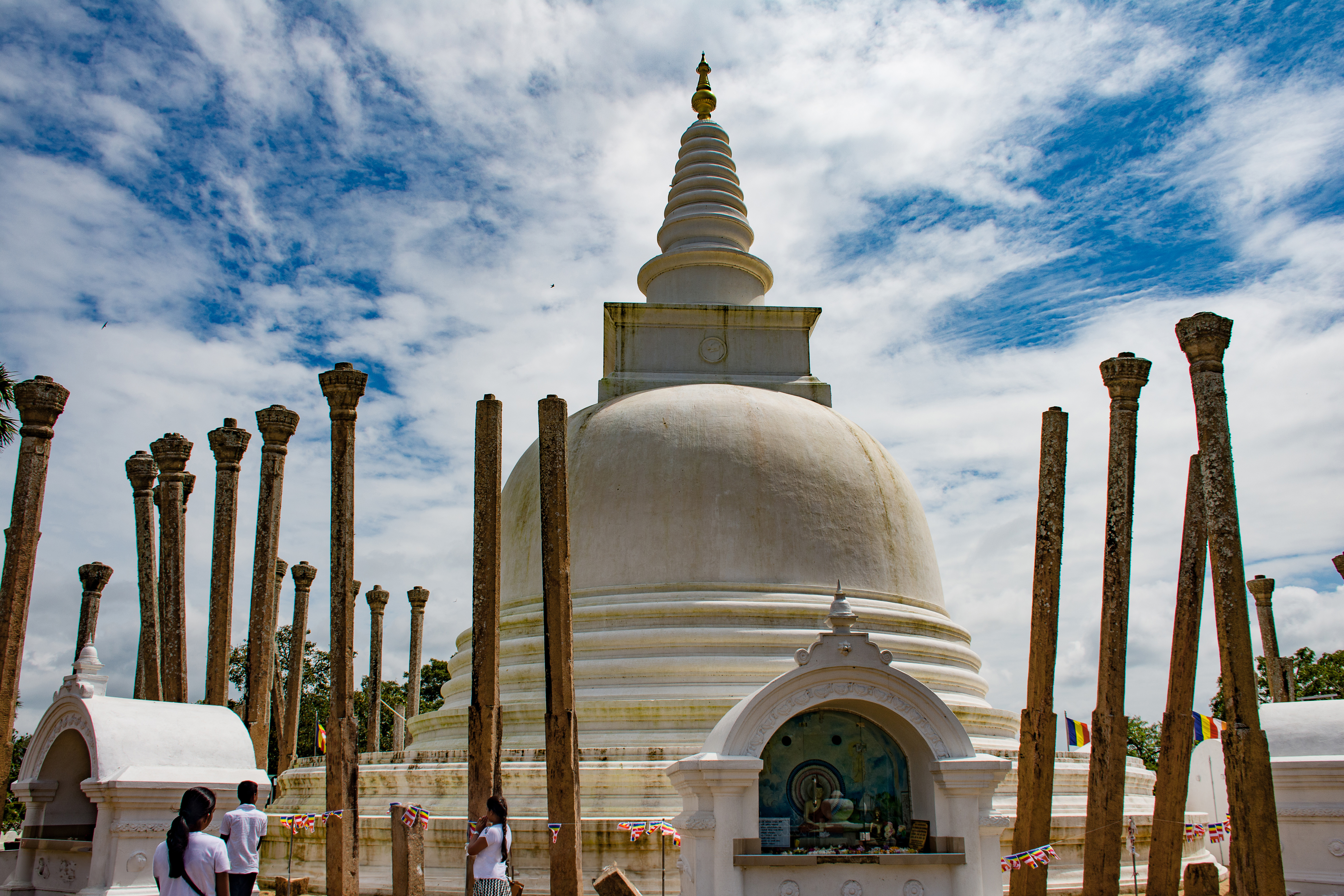
Thuparamaya Stupa and Stone Pillars

== See also ==
- Vatadage
- Atamasthana
- Solosmasthana
- Anuradhapura period
- Devanampiya Tissa of Anuradhapura
