= List of Archaeological Protected Monuments in Anuradhapura District =

This is a list of Archaeological Protected Monuments in Anuradhapura District, Sri Lanka.

Monument	Image	Location	Grama Niladhari Division	Divisional Secretary's Division	Registered	Description	Refs
Abarali Vihara			No. 679-Hinguruwewa	Palagala	23 January 2009	The Tampita Vihare	
Abhayagiri vihāra				Nuwaragam Palatha Central			
Adiyakanda Forest Hermitage		Ritigala	No. 604-Galapittagala	Palugaswewa	6 June 2008	All the drip ledged rock caves with inscriptions	
Adiyakanda Forest Hermitage		Ritigala	No. 604-Galapittagala	Palugaswewa	23 January 2009	The eight drip ledged caves with Brahmi characters at Rittigalakande of the Andiyakanda Aranya	
Ambagahawewa Vihara		Ambagahawewa	No. 325, Ambagahawewa	Nochchiyagama	22 November 2002	The ancient Stupa	
Ambagahawewa Vihara		Ambagahawewa	No. 325, Ambagahawewa	Nochchiyagama	6 June 2008	The ancient dagoba	
Andiyagala Raja Maha Vihara		Rajanganaya Track 06	No. 448, Angamuwa	Rajanganaya	23 February 2007	Ancient Stuhpa, Cave with Dewa image remains of other ancient buildings and the rock with inscriptions and the rock Bodhigaraya	
Angamuwewa Wewa ruins			No. 448-Angamuwa	Rajanganaya	6 June 2008	The rock stone with sword and other marks, dagoba, two rock inscriptions near the Angamuwewa Tank and tank outlet	
Annasigala Raja Maha Vihara			No. 499, Puliyankulama	Ipalogama	24 July 2009	The two drip-ledged caves	
Anula Saya		Diggala	No. 586-Poovarasankulam	Mihinthale	6 June 2008	The dagoba	
Anuradhapura Inner city archaeological sites		Pethispura		Nuwaragam Palatha Central	18 June 1999	The land bordering to Wasala road at South, Anula Mawatha at West, Y road at North and Vatavandana road at East side	
Athkanda Vihara		Ellapothana	No. 209, Thulana Kumbuk Gollawa	Kahatagasdigiliya	13 February 2009	The stone inscriptions, drip ledged caves, ancient flight of steps, Guard Stones, Sandhakada Pahan and the ruined building in the premises	
Avukana Buddha statue				Kekirawa			
Baratha Naga Cave Complex		Millagala	No. 368, Nelumvila Thulana	Vilachchiya	13 February 2009	All the drip ledged cave with inscriptions, the flight of steps on rock, building ruins and pillar base	
Barathanaga Len Senasana		Billewa	No. 368, Nelumvila Galviharawewa	Mahavilachchiya	30 December 2011	Pre-historic paintings and all caves with Brahmi Letters and other archaeological features	
Bodhirukkarama Vihara		Aluthwewa	No. 381-Medagama Tulana	Thalawa	23 January 2009	The Attani stone inscription	
Budures Vihara		Ralapanawa	No. 76, Ralapanawa	Medawachchiya	23 February 2007	Cave with drip-ledges and ancient dagaba	
Budures Vihara		Ralapanawa	No. 76, Ralapanawa	Medawachchiya	6 June 2008	The ancient dagoba, drip ledged cave	
Dakkhina Stupa (Dakunu Dagoba)				Nuwaragam Palatha Central			
Daniyagala Sri Wanasinghe Vihara			No. 680, Daniyagala	Palagala	30 December 2011	Drip-ledged caves, old Stupa and tempita (on stone piles) buildings	
Dematamal Purana Vihara			Adampan-E	Nochchiyagama	23 January 2009	The very ancient building, dagoba, drip ledged caves, girilipi and ancient stone Buddha statue	
Doramadalawa Raja Maha Vihara			No. 587-Doramadalawa	Mihinthale	23 January 2009	The four drip ledged rock caves with Brahmi characters and a rock inscription within the precincts	
Dutuwewa Purana Vihara			No. 26-Thunchutuwa	Kebithigollewa	23 January 2009	The ancient Dagoba	
Ellawewa ruins			No. 675, Ellewewa	Palagala	22 July 2011	Flight of steps carved on the rock, ponds and the rock surface with other archaeological rematch found in the area	
Eruwewa mountain ruins			No. 552, Ethungama South	Thirappane	22 July 2011	The drip-ledged caves and rock tank	
Galapitagala Naga Vihara		Ilukbodegama	No. 164, Ilukbodayagama	Galenbindunuwewa	22 July 2011	The drip - ledged cave and the cave with cobra hood	
Galkanda Purana Vihara		Eppawela	No. 391, Palugaswewagama	Thalawa	24 July 2009	The two drip-ledged caves	
Galkirinda Raja Maha Vihara		Punawa	No. 43-Prabodhagama	Medawachchiya	23 January 2009	The drip ledged rock caves with Brahmi Characters rock with flight of steps, and rock inscriptions	
Gallen Raja Maha Vihara			No. 507 Aliwanguwa	Ipalogama	24 July 2009	The drip ledged caves (Len) with Brahmi Letters	
Gallewa Forest Reserve ruins			No. 554, Paindikulama	Thirappane	22 July 2011	The drip-ledged caves, stupa and pond	
Galnewa Raja Maha Vihara			No. 477 Galnewa	Galnewa	24 July 2009	Drip-ledged Cave Temple (Len Viharaya)	
Galyaya ruins			No. 408 Tissapura	Thalawa	24 July 2009	The ancient Dagoba and two drip-ledged caves	
Gemunu Chaithyaramaya			No. 534-Aluth Puliyankulam	Thirappane	23 January 2009	The Dagoba and pathway wall	
Girilen Raja Maha Vihara		Meemalwewa	No. 88-Meewamalewa Madule	Rambewa	6 June 2008	The ancient dagoba and six drip ledged caves	
Gonagiri Raja Maha Vihara		Kahatagasdigiliya	No. 230, Mahamessallawa	Kahatagasdigiliya	30 December 2011	All drip-ledged caves including the cave temple, plights of steps, ponds and ancient Dagaba	
Habarana Purana Tempita Vihara		Habarana		Palugaswewa	1 November 1996	Tempita vihara and paintings	
Habarana Wewa ruins			No. 589	Palugaswewa	23 January 2009	The ancient Dagoba on the rock near Habarana wewa	
Heenukgala ruins			No. 418, Tambuttegama	Thambuttegama	24 July 2009	The ancient chaitya Godella (Hillock)	
Hithagema Aranya Senasana			No. 632-Ambulgaswewa	Kekirawa	23 January 2009	The drip ledged caves with Brahmi inscriptions, ancient buildings	
Ihalakagama Rock ruins			No. 519, Ihalakagama	Ipalogama	24 July 2009	The drip-ledged caves located at the Western end of the Ihalakagama Rock wall	
Isurumuniya				Nuwaragam Palatha Central			
Jaya Sri Maha Bodhi				Nuwaragam Palatha Central			
Jayasundararama Vihara		Pahala Talawa	No. 407, Pahala Talawa	Thalawa	30 December 2011	Stone pillars, statues, foundation stones and ruins	
Jetavanaramaya				Nuwaragam Palatha Central			
Kada Hatha Vihara			No. 103-Diviya Udabandawewa Thulana	Rambewa	23 January 2009	The ancient dagoba, Tampita Vihare, buildings ruins and rock with pond	
Kahalla Archaeological site			No. 663, Kahalla	Palagala	22 July 2011	The ancient stupa and the building with stone pillars	
Karagahawewa Raja Maha Vihara			No. 406, Karagaha Wawa	Thalawa	23 February 2007	Remains of ancient buildings	
Ketagala and Mahagala ruins		Kandulegama	No. 460-Kandulegama	Galnewa	23 January 2009	The dagoba mounds and other archaeological evidence found on the rock hills called Kandulegama Ketagala and Mahagala	
Kidagalegama Vihara			No. 73, Thulana	Medawachchiya	23 February 2007	Ancient Awasage and Dalada Maligawa	
Kinihira Vehera		Pebbendiyawa		Palagala	24 July 2009	Drip-ledged Caves	
Kinihiri Kanda Raja Maha Vihara			No. 633- Medawewa	Kekirawa	23 January 2009	The drip ledged caves and stone with sacred foot print	
Kotasara Piyangala Raja maha Vihara			No. 648- Kotagala	Kekirawa	23 January 2009	The drip ledged rock caves	
Kuda Dambulu Raja Maha Vihara			No. 117-Sinhala Walahawiddhawewa	Horowpothana	6 June 2008	The drip ledged caves	
Kuda Dambulu Raja Maha Vihara			No. 117-Sinhala Walahawiddhawewa	Horowpothana	23 January 2009	The two drip ledged rock caves and the ancient flight of steps	
Kudagal Vihara		Orugoda Yaya	No. 436, Dhelnegama	Thambuttegama	23 January 2009	The sacred foot print and rock stone with inscriptions	
Kuttam Pokuna (Twin ponds)				Nuwaragam Palatha Central			
Lankarama				Nuwaragam Palatha Central			
Lovamahapaya				Nuwaragam Palatha Central			
Madatugala Diggala ruins		Kotagala		Kekirawa	22 November 2002	Three drip ledged caves	
Maha Rathmal kele Watta ruins			No. 259, Srawasthipura	Nachchadoowa	23 February 2007	Padanagaraya pond and remains of ancient buildings situated in the place	
Mahaelagamuwa Ambalama			No. 648, Mahaelagamuwa	Kekirawa	22 July 2011	The ancient Ambalama	
Makulewa Purana Raja Maha Vihara			No. 415, Makulewa	Thambuttegama	24 July 2009	The ancient Dagoba, Image House, and four Ponds	
Maminiyawa Raja Maha Vihara			No. 611-Maminiyawa	Kekirawa	23 January 2009	The ancient Chaitya	
Maradankadawala Gallen Vihara		Maradankadawala		Kekirawa	22 November 2002	Four Stupa and two caves with paintings	
Maradankadawala Vihara			No. 133, Maradankadawala	Horowpothana	23 January 2009	The drip ledged rock caves	
Maya Ulpatha ruins			No. 592 Maya Ulpatha	Palugaswewa	23 February 2007	Stone Buddha Statue and remains of other buildings and inscriptions situated in the jungle close to Maya Ulpatha ancient paddy fields	
Mihintale		Mihintale		Mihinthale	26 September 1941	Ambastala Stupa, Maha Seya, Sela chaitya, Naga pokuna, and other two Stupas	
Naka Vihara		Kalagampalatha		Palagala	25 October 1958		
Namalpura Sri Vishuddharama Vihara		Madawala	No. 598 Madawala	Palugaswewa	23 February 2007	Tampita Vihara and inscriptions with cave	
Nambakada Wewa ancient tank ruins			No. 35-Herath Halmillewa	Kebithigollewa	6 June 2008	The Bisocotuwa and sluice	
Nawagala Raja Maha Vihara			No. 386-Katiyawa Yaya-1	Thalawa	23 January 2009	The two ancient Dagobas	
Nisala Aranya Senasana		Morottegama	No. 676, Morottegama	Palagala	22 July 2011	All caves with drip-ledges and stone inscriptions and rock inscriptions	
Orugalseya Rajamaha Vihara			No. 626-Malawa	Kekirawa	23 January 2009	The ancient pond, flight of steps, buildings evidence, ancient dagoba on rock	
Oththappuwa Vihara			No. 354-Oththappuwa	Nochchiyagama	23 January 2009	The ancient dagoba, Buddha shrine hall, rock with drip ledged caves with sacred foot print	
Panikkankulama Wewa			No. 326, Katupattewa	Nochchiyagama	24 July 2009	The ancient sluice gate	
Poonewa Maha Vidyalaya ruins			Poonewa	Medawachchiya	23 February 2007	Ancient Dagoba situated in Poonewa Maha Vidyalaya premises	
Puleliya Thammennewa rock ruins			No. 63-Thulana	Medawachchiya	6 June 2008	The main construction with the stone parapet near the Puleliya Thammennewa Galvatiya	
Puleliya Thammennewa rock ruins			No. 63-Thulana	Medawachchiya	6 June 2008	The main construction with the stone parapet near the Puleliya Thammennewa Galvatiya	
Puliyankadawala Purana Vihara			No. 150-Puliyankadawala	Horowpothana	23 January 2009	The stupa mound and the ancient stone pillars	
Puliyankulama Padanagara			No. 498, Sangamwewa	Ipalogama	24 July 2009	Puliyankulama Padanagara Building	
Ralapanawa Padiketu Gala			Ralapanawa	Nochchiyagama	23 February 2007	Rock surface with archaeological factors in the place known as Padiketu Gala	
Ratmale Kanda Raja Maha Vihara			Ratmale Kanda	Kekirawa	6 June 2008	The drip ledged caves	
Renakanda Purana Raja Maha Vihara			Udakorassagalla	Kekirawa	6 June 2008	The ancient Buddha shrine and sacred foot print	
Ruwanmaduwa ruins			No. 308, Nelumvila	Vilachchiya	24 July 2009	Ruwanmaduwa drip ledged caves	
Ruwanwelisaya				Nuwaragam Palatha Central			
Samadhi Statue				Nuwaragam Palatha Central			
Sandagala Vihara		Thoranaka	Korassagalle	Kekirawa	6 June 2008	The Tampita Vihara	
Sandagalpaya Raja Maha Vihara			No. 624-Mayilagaswewa	Kekirawa	23 January 2009	The rock with steps and rock inscription, drip ledged cave, pathway wall and stupa ruins	
Senpathi Nandimitra Aranya Senasana		Diyatittawewa	No. 151, Diyatittawewa	Horowpothana	22 July 2011	All caves with drip-ledges	
Shailabimbarama Vihara			No. 341 Andarawewa	Nochchiyagama	30 December 2011	Ancient Dagaba Godella, building ruins and ancient image house	
Sri Bhatikatissa Raja Maha Vihara		Galgirikanda		Medawachchiya	22 July 2011	Rock inscription and all caves with drip-ledges and Brahmi letters (Orthography)	
Sri Dalada Vihara		Mahakumbukgollewa		Medawachchiya	30 December 2011	The Tempita (on stone piles) building	
Sri Datusena Raja Maha Vihara			No. 623-Karunkankulam, Hatarakanuwa Usgala	Kekirawa	6 June 2008	The drip ledged rock cave	
Sri Datusena Raja Maha Vihara			No. 651-Kithulhitiyawa	Kekirawa	23 January 2009	The drip ledged rock cave on natural rock and sacred foot print	
Sri Devatissa Raja Maha Vihara			Elahamuwa Kekirawa	Kekirawa	6 June 2008	The inscriptions, the drip ledged cave complex and rock inscriptions	
Sri Kashyapa Vihara		Ramadegala	No. 651-Kittulhitiyawa	Kekirawa	6 June 2008	The ancient stupa and building with stone pillars	
Sri Kashyapa Vihara			No. 651-Kithulhitiyawa	Kekirawa	23 January 2009	The ancient building with stone pillars	
Sri Kosso Kanda Raja Maha Vihara			No. 615-Kalepuliyankulam Kanduboda	Kekirawa	6 June 2008	The drip ledged rock cave with inscriptions	
Sri Madhurasiri Vihara			No. 371, Navodagama	Mahavilachchiya	23 January 2009	The buildings ruins with stone pillars	
Sri Padmagiri Purana Raja Maha Vihara		Kudanelubewa	No. 265, Kudanelubewa	Nachchadoowa	23 February 2007	Remains of ancient buildings, steps and rock surface with other archaeological factors	
Sri Sumanagira Raja Maha Vihara			Katiyawa Yaya No. 7-Thulana	Thalawa	6 June 2008	The drip ledged rock cave	
Sri Sumanagira Raja Maha Vihara			Katiyawa Yaya No. 7-Thulana	Thalawa	23 January 2009	The drip ledged rock cave, pillar base, rock with naga sketch evdcence and drain, ancient pond	
Stone Bridge, Malwathu Oya				Nuwaragam Palatha Central			
Sujatharama Vihara		Puhulegama	No. 134, Puhulewewa	Horowpothana	23 January 2009	The Tanpita Vihare and the ancient stone pathway wall within the precincts	
Swasthigala			No. 586-Maradankulama	Mihinthale	23 January 2009	The drip ledged rock cave with ancient paintings at the place	
Tammennakanda Purana Vihara			No. 507, Galwanguwa	Ipalogama	24 July 2009	The drip-ledged caves	
Telkiriyawa Purana Gal Vihara		Maliyadewpura	No. 429, Galviharawewa	Thambuttegama	30 December 2011	The ancient plight of steps, pond and ruins of two buildings	
Thammennagala Raja Maha Vihara			No. 547, Indigahawewa	Thalawa	24 July 2009	The drip-ledged caves, Rock inscription and Chaitya Godella (hillock)	
Thanthirimale				Mahavilachchiya			
Thonigala Rock Inscription			No. 519 Ihalalakagama	Ipalogama	24 July 2009		
Thuparamaya				Nuwaragam Palatha Central			
Veheragala Getalawa Mountain ruins			No. 528, Getalawa	Thirappane	23 February 2007	Stupa and remains of buildings at the peak of Veheragala Getalawa Mountain	
Veragala Sri Jinendrarama Vihara		Walasgala	No. 596-Kumbukwewa	Palugaswewa	23 January 2009	The Stupa foundation pillar holes, the stone with steps and a pond	
Vessagiri				Nuwaragam Palatha Central			
Vijithapura Raja Maha Vihara		Kalawewa		Kalawewa	31 March 1950		
Wadigawewa ruins			No. 126, Thulana Wadigawewa	Horowpothana	13 February 2009	The building ruins in the Wadigawewa (Moragaha Digiliya)	
Wahalkada Gal Len Raja Maha Vihara			No. 40, Kebithigollewa	Kebithigollewa	23 February 2007	Stuhpa, two caves with Brahimi characters and other archaeological factors situated in natural rock surface in the premises	
Wataram Pond		Anuradhapura sacred city		Nuwaragam Palatha	4 July 1975		
Waththiyagala ruins			No. 383	Ipalogama	23 February 2007	Rock surface with archaeological factors and signs known as Waththiyagala	
Weheragala Raja Maha Vihara			No. 9, Abhayapura	Padaviya	23 January 2009	The ancient dagoba mound, 3 rock inscriptions and Galvatiya with archaeological remains	
Weheragala ruins			No. 12, Mahasen	Padaviya	23 February 2007	Weheragala Dagaba situated at the edge of Nagaswewa, inscriptions in the stone wall and remains of ancient buildings	
Weheragodella Purana Vihara			No. 403, Kurunduwewa	Thalawa	23 February 2007	Ancient Dagaba, buildings and pond	
Yahangala Purana Raja Maha Vihara			No. 668-Kalugala	Palagala	23 January 2009	The eight drip ledged caves and the drip ledged cave with Brahmi Characters and seven seats and a rock inscription	
Yahangala ruins		Kandanekatunawewa	No. 87-Ihala Kolongaswewa	Kahatagasdigiliya	23 January 2009	The drip ledged rock cave and ancients seat	
Yakka Bendi Bemma		Senapura Track 4	No. 481-Amunugama Karuwelagaswewa	Galnewa	6 June 2008	The stone stacked wall known as Yakka Bendhi Bemma at the Kala Oya Bund on the boundary of Senapura Track 4	
