= Kahalla-Pallekele Sanctuary =

Nature reserve in Sri Lanka

- IUCN category IV (habitat/species management area)
- Location within Sri Lanka
- Location: Central, North Central, and North West provinces, Sri Lanka
- Nearest city: Anuradhapura
- Coordinates: 7°52′33″N 80°30′44″E
- Area: 21,690 ha (83.7 sq mi)
- Established: 11 July 1989
- Governing body: Department of Wildlife Conservation

Kahalla-Pallekele Sanctuary (Sinhala: කහල්ල-පල්ලෙකැලේ අභයභූමිය) is a natural reserve in Sri Lanka and is the fourth largest (by area) of the 50 sanctuaries in the country. It covers an area of 21,690 ha (53,600 acres) across the Palagala and Kekirawa Divisional Secretariats in the Anuradhapura District of the North Central province, the Galgamuwa and Polpithigama Divisional Secretariats of the Kurunegala District in the North Western province, and the Matale District of the Central province.

The sanctuary was established on 11 July 1989, in an area close to the Balalu Oya, Hakwatuna Oya, and Kala Wewa, with the primary objective of securing a suitable habitat for wildlife, particularly wild elephants, which have lost their natural habitats due to agricultural activities, settlements and development activities in the area within the Mahaweli Development programme. The sanctuary is home to 150-200 elephants and is currently managed by the Department of Wildlife Conservation (DWC). The sanctuary does not have appointed park wardens and is administrated by the Assistant Director of Northwestern DWC, with the support of range officers. The range officers are based at Herathgama and Meegalawa.

This sanctuary includes the Kahalle and Palle mountains, and the catchments of three major rivers, Kala Oya, Mi Oya and Deduru Oya.

The sanctuary contains a number of endangered (EN), vulnerable (VU), and Near-threatened species (NT) including:

- Alpine swift (Tachymarptis melba bakeri) EN
- Banded bay cuckoo (Cacomantis sonneratii waiti) NT
- Barking deer (Muntiacus muntjak malabaricus) NT
- Black-crowned night heron (Nycticorax nycticorax nycticorax) NT
- Black-winged kite (Elanus caeruleus vociferus) NT
- Eurasian otter (Lutra lutra) VU
- Greater racket-tailed drongo (Dicrurus paradiseus ceylonicus) NT
- Grey-headed fish eagle 9Icthyophaga ichthyaetus) NT
- Indian pangolin (Manis crassicaudata) NT
- Malabar trogon (Harpactes fasciatus) NT
- Purple-faced langur (Semnopithecus vetulus) EN
- Red-faced malkoha (Phaenicophaeus pyrrhocephalus) VU
- Sambar deer (Rusa unicolor unicolor) NT
- Sirkeer malkoha (Phaenicophaeus leschenaultii) VU
- Square-tailed drongo-cuckoo (Surniculus lugubris) NT
- Sri Lankan elephant (Elephas maximus maximus) EN
- Sri Lankan leopard (Panthera pardus kotiya) EN
- Sri Lanka spurfowl (Galloperdix bicalcarata) NT
- Sri Lankan sloth bear (Melursus ursinus inornatus) EN
- Sri Lanka white-eye (Zosterops ceylonensis) NT
- Stripe-necked mongoose (Herpestes vitticollis) VU
- Wild water buffalo (Bubalus arnee) VU
- Woolly-necked stork (Ciconia episcopus episcopus) NT

== Heritage sites ==
The reserve contains a number of archaeological sites, such as the Avukana, Raswehera temples and ancient reservoir systems, including the Kala Wewa, and Balalu Wewa. The ruins of a Buddhist monastery, near the Kahalla Reservoir, known as the Kahalla Archaeological site, was formally included as an 'Archaeological Protected Monument' by the government on 22 July 2011.

== See also ==
- List of wildlife sanctuaries of Sri Lanka
