= Puhudivula Grama Niladhari Division =

Puhudivula
- Grama Niladhari Division
- Interactive map of Puhudivula
- Coordinates: 8.674075°N 80.556723°E
- Country: Sri Lanka
- Province: North Central Province
- District: Anuradhapura District
- Divisional Secretariat: Medawachchiya Divisional Secretariat
- Electoral District: Anuradhapura Electoral District
- Polling Division: Medawachchiya Polling Division

Area
  - Total: 35.64 km^{2} (13.76 sq mi)
- Elevation: 114 m (374 ft)

Population (2012)
  - Total: 1,323
  - Density: 37/km^{2} (96/sq mi)
- ISO 3166 code: LK-7109020

Puhudivula

Puhudivula Grama Niladhari Division is a Grama Niladhari Division of the Medawachchiya Divisional Secretariat of Anuradhapura District of North Central Province, Sri Lanka . It has Grama Niladhari Division Code 44.

Puhudivula is a surrounded by the Gonumeriyawa, Heerallugama, Ethakada, Lolugaswewa, Paranahalmillewa, Alagalla, Asikulam, Mahamylankulama and Kunchuttuwa Grama Niladhari Divisions.

== Demographics ==
=== Ethnicity ===
The Puhudivula Grama Niladhari Division has a Sinhalese majority (100.0%) . In comparison, the Medawachchiya Divisional Secretariat (which contains the Puhudivula Grama Niladhari Division) has a Sinhalese majority (93.4%)

Ethnicity in Puhudivula
1. Sinhalese (100.0%)
2. Other (0.00%)

=== Religion ===
The Puhudivula Grama Niladhari Division has a Buddhist majority (100.0%) . In comparison, the Medawachchiya Divisional Secretariat (which contains the Puhudivula Grama Niladhari Division) has a Buddhist majority (92.9%)

Religion in Puhudivula
1. Buddhist (100.0%)
2. Other (0.00%)
