= Yakawewa Grama Niladhari Division =

Yakawewa
- Grama Niladhari Division
- Interactive map of Yakawewa
- Coordinates: 8.581704°N 80.386079°E
- Country: Sri Lanka
- Province: North Central Province
- District: Anuradhapura District
- Divisional Secretariat: Medawachchiya Divisional Secretariat
- Electoral District: Anuradhapura Electoral District
- Polling Division: Medawachchiya Polling Division

Area
  - Total: 16.86 km^{2} (6.51 sq mi)
- Elevation: 15 m (49 ft)

Population (2012)
  - Total: 1,651
  - Density: 98/km^{2} (250/sq mi)
- ISO 3166 code: LK-7109125

Yakawewa

Yakawewa Grama Niladhari Division is a Grama Niladhari Division of the Medawachchiya Divisional Secretariat of Anuradhapura District of North Central Province, Sri Lanka. It has Grama Niladhari Division Code 50.

Yakawewa is a surrounded by the Puleliya, Kuda Kumbukgollewa, Periyakulama, Thammenna Elawaka, Maradanmaduwa and Sinnasippikulam Grama Niladhari Divisions.

== Demographics ==
=== Ethnicity ===
The Yakawewa Grama Niladhari Division has a Sinhalese majority (63.0%) and a significant Moor population (36.4%). In comparison, the Medawachchiya Divisional Secretariat (which contains the Yakawewa Grama Niladhari Division) has a Sinhalese majority (93.4%)

Ethnicity in Yakawewa
1. Sinhalese (63.0%)
2. Moor (36.4%)
3. Other (0.60%)

=== Religion ===
The Yakawewa Grama Niladhari Division has a Buddhist majority (63.1%) and a significant Muslim population (36.3%). In comparison, the Medawachchiya Divisional Secretariat (which contains the Yakawewa Grama Niladhari Division) has a Buddhist majority (92.9%)

Religion in Yakawewa
1. Buddhist (63.1%)
2. Muslim (36.3%)
3. Other (0.60%)
