= Naigala Grama Niladhari Division =

Naigala
- Grama Niladhari Division
- Interactive map of Naigala
- Coordinates: 8.156297°N 80.198665°E
- Country: Sri Lanka
- Province: North Central Province
- District: Anuradhapura District
- Divisional Secretariat: Rajanganaya Divisional Secretariat
- Electoral District: Anuradhapura Electoral District
- Polling Division: Kalawewa Polling Division

Area
  - Total: 2.8 km^{2} (1.1 sq mi)
- Elevation: 52 m (171 ft)

Population (2012)
  - Total: 1,351
  - Density: 483/km^{2} (1,250/sq mi)
- ISO 3166 code: LK-7142070

Naigala

Naigala Grama Niladhari Division is a Grama Niladhari Division of the Rajanganaya Divisional Secretariat of Anuradhapura District of North Central Province, Sri Lanka. It has Grama Niladhari Division Code 443.

Naigala is a surrounded by the Track 3, Maha Thimbirikalla, Thissapura, Serasumgala and Thimbiripokuna Grama Niladhari Divisions.

== Demographics ==
=== Ethnicity ===
The Naigala Grama Niladhari Division has a Sinhalese majority (100.0%). In comparison, the Rajanganaya Divisional Secretariat (which contains the Naigala Grama Niladhari Division) has a Sinhalese majority (99.9%)

Ethnicity in Naigala
1. Sinhalese (100.0%)
2. Other (0.00%)

=== Religion ===
The Naigala Grama Niladhari Division has a Buddhist majority (98.7%). In comparison, the Rajanganaya Divisional Secretariat (which contains the Naigala Grama Niladhari Division) has a Buddhist majority (98.4%)

Religion in Naigala
1. Buddhist (98.7%)
2. Roman Catholic (1.00%)
3. Other (0.30%)
