= Mediyawa (Thalawa) Grama Niladhari Division =

Mediyawa
- Grama Niladhari Division
- Interactive map of Mediyawa
- Coordinates: 8.135204°N 80.392743°E
- Country: Sri Lanka
- Province: North Central Province
- District: Anuradhapura District
- Divisional Secretariat: Thalawa Divisional Secretariat
- Electoral District: Anuradhapura Electoral District
- Polling Division: Kalawewa Polling Division

Area
  - Total: 2.95 km^{2} (1.14 sq mi)
- Elevation: 110 m (360 ft)

Population (2012)
  - Total: 960
  - Density: 325/km^{2} (840/sq mi)
- ISO 3166 code: LK-7148130

Mediyawa

Mediyawa Grama Niladhari Division is a Grama Niladhari Division of the Thalawa Divisional Secretariat of Anuradhapura District of North Central Province, Sri Lanka. It has Grama Niladhari Division Code 392.

Mediyawa is a surrounded by the Galwaduwagama, Eliyadivulwewa, Ihala Siyambalewa, Katiyawa Track 01, Kadigawa and Katiyawa Track 02 Grama Niladhari Divisions.

== Demographics ==
=== Ethnicity ===
The Mediyawa Grama Niladhari Division has a Sinhalese majority (100.0%). In comparison, the Thalawa Divisional Secretariat (which contains the Mediyawa Grama Niladhari Division) has a Sinhalese majority (98.7%)

Ethnicity in Mediyawa
1. Sinhalese (100.0%)
2. Other (0.00%)

=== Religion ===
The Mediyawa Grama Niladhari Division has a Buddhist majority (99.3%). In comparison, the Thalawa Divisional Secretariat (which contains the Mediyawa Grama Niladhari Division) has a Buddhist majority (97.9%)

Religion in Mediyawa
1. Buddhist (99.3%)
2. Other (0.70%)
