= Yakalla Grama Niladhari Division =

Yakalla
- Grama Niladhari Division
- Interactive map of Yakalla
- Coordinates: 8.216440°N 80.687677°E
- Country: Sri Lanka
- Province: North Central Province
- District: Anuradhapura District
- Divisional Secretariat: Galenbindunuwewa Divisional Secretariat
- Electoral District: Anuradhapura Electoral District
- Polling Division: Horowpothana Polling Division

Area
  - Total: 9.33 km^{2} (3.60 sq mi)
- Elevation: 149 m (489 ft)

Population (2012)
  - Total: 2,044
  - Density: 219/km^{2} (570/sq mi)
- ISO 3166 code: LK-7127195

Yakalla

Yakalla Grama Niladhari Division is a Grama Niladhari Division of the Galenbindunuwewa Divisional Secretariat of Anuradhapura District of North Central Province, Sri Lanka . It has Grama Niladhari Division Code 186.

Yakalla is surrounded by the Ihala Galkulama, Hurulumeegahapattiya, Manankattiya, Muriyakadawala and Navakkulama Grama Niladhari Divisions.

== Demographics ==
=== Ethnicity ===
The Yakalla Grama Niladhari Division has a Sinhalese majority (100.0%) . In comparison, the Galenbindunuwewa Divisional Secretariat (which contains the Yakalla Grama Niladhari Division) has a Sinhalese majority (96.9%)

Ethnicity in Yakalla
1. Sinhalese (100.0%)
2. Other (0.00%)

=== Religion ===
The Yakalla Grama Niladhari Division has a Buddhist majority (99.2%) . In comparison, the Galenbindunuwewa Divisional Secretariat (which contains the Yakalla Grama Niladhari Division) has a Buddhist majority (96.7%)

Religion in Yakalla
1. Buddhist (99.2%)
2. Other (0.80%)
