= Eppawala =

Eppawala එප්පාවල எப்பாவல
- Location in Sri Lanka
- Coordinates: 8°8′33″N 80°24′10″E
- Country: Sri Lanka
- Province: North Central Province
- District: Anuradhapura
- Division: Thalawa

Government
  - Grama Niladhari: Gurumuni Haramanisge Chandrasiri Soysa
- Elevation: 348 ft (106 m)
- Time zone: UTC+5:30 (Sri Lanka Standard Time Zone)
- Postal code: 50260

Eppawala (Sinhala: එප්පාවල, Tamil: எப்பாவல) is a settlement and Grama Niladhari administrative division in North Central Province, Sri Lanka. It forms part of the Thalawa Divisional Secretariat within the Anuradhapura District. It is situated around 20 kilometres (12 mi) south of the ancient city of Anuradhapura and 150 kilometres (93 mi) north east of Sri Lankan capital Colombo.

Eppawala and its surroundings are located within a geological region of high-grade phosphate deposits – Sri Lanka's only phosphate deposits. Mined since the 1970s by government-owned Lanka Phosphate, the deposits attracted media attention and spawned national protests in the late 1990s when overseas corporations expressed interest in initiating intensive mining operations.

== Name ==
Although the name Eppawala refers to the settlement itself, in the context of the surrounding geology it may also refer to the network of villages located within the proposed phosphate exploration zones and for which Eppawala is the urban centre. In 1999, approximately 40,000 people lived inside this zone.

== Population ==
Humans have resided in Eppawala for over 2000 years. It received a population boost during the 1990s when internally displaced people (IDPs) settled there as a cause of the Sri Lankan Civil War, due in part to Eppawala's location on the fringes of regional population hub Anuradhapura.

== Geography ==
Eppawala is situated within the centre of the ancient region of Rajarata. Past civilizations who had populated the region had developed sustainable methods of conserving and irrigating excess monsoon rainfall, methods still in use by the current population and based around a 87 kilometres (54 mi) long canal named the Jayaganga.

== Phosphate deposits ==
Around 60,000,000 metric tons (59,000,000 long tons; 66,000,000 short tons) of phosphates have been determined to exist within an area of 4 square kilometres (1.5 sq mi) around Eppawala. The deposits were discovered in 1971 when a government geological survey found igneous carbonate apatite. Responsibility for the deposits was assigned in 1974 to a government Divisional Development Council and subsequently to Lanka Phosphate, the present day controllers.

Lanka Phosphate mined unintensively from 1977, yielding 45,000 metric tons (44,000 long tons; 50,000 short tons) of rock annually. However, in 1987 an American corporation named Freeport-McMoRan began discreet negotiations for mining rights to the region. The bidding gained public attention after the Sri Lankan government advertised for joint venture proposals in 1992, and negotiation with IMC Arigo (an association between the IMC Group and Freeport-McMoRan) and Tomen Corporation began. They were bidding for control of a 56 square kilometres (22 sq mi) exploration zone with intentions to mine 26,100,000 metric tons (25,700,000 long tons; 28,800,000 short tons) over 30 years.

=== Public response ===
There was a widespread perception that these plans, if they came to fruition, would have an overwhelmingly negative impact upon the regional environment and destroy the functioning of the Jayaganga irrigation system. Furthermore, Freeport-McMoRan's conduct in past endeavours – such as at its Grasberg mine in Indonesia – had drawn much criticism. A change in government in 1994 delayed proceedings briefly, but the new government were found to be similarly eager to sell the deposits and final drafts of the plans were completed on August 4, 1997, granting IMC Agrico exclusive mining rights within the exploration zone.

Numerous demonstrations were held nationally over the next few years, including a protest involving 7000 people on March 30, 2000, in Colombo fronted by the Committee for the Protection of the Eppawela Phosphate mines.

In 1999 a court case Bulankulama v Ministry of Industrial Development (884/99) was tabled by seven individuals requesting protection for Eppawala and claiming breach of their fundamental rights as set out in the Constitution of Sri Lanka. This was upheld in the Supreme Court of Sri Lanka on June 2, 2000. Bidding on the deposits was halted and further study of the region was ordered.

== See also ==
- Economy of Sri Lanka
- Environmental impact of mining
- Phosphate mining in Nauru
