= Medawachchiya Polling Division =

Medawachchiya
- Polling Division
- Coordinates: 8.697648°N 80.605503°E
- Country: Sri Lanka
- Province: North Central Province, Sri Lanka
- Electoral District: Anuradhapura Electoral District

Area
  - Total: 1,354.18 km^{2} (522.85 sq mi)

Population (2012)
  - Total: 92,229
  - Density: 68/km^{2} (180/sq mi)
- ISO 3166 code: EC-17A

The Medawachchiya Polling Division is a Polling Division in the Anuradhapura Electoral District, in the North Central Province, Sri Lanka.

== Presidential Election Results ==
=== Summary ===
The winner of Medawachchiya has matched the final country result 6 out of 8 times. Hence, Medawachchiya is a Weak Bellwether for Presidential Elections.

Year	Medawachchiya	Anuradhapura Electoral District	MAE %	Sri Lanka	MAE %
2019	SLPP	SLPP	1.35%	SLPP	7.86%
2015	UPFA	UPFA	5.37%	NDF	11.21%
2010	UPFA	UPFA	2.95%	UPFA	11.14%
2005	UPFA	UPFA	1.46%	UPFA	6.21%
1999	PA	PA	1.91%	PA	4.68%
1994	PA	PA	1.06%	PA	2.70%
1988	SLFP	SLFP	3.64%	UNP	12.02%
1982	UNP	UNP	1.10%	UNP	4.64%
Matches/Mean MAE	6/8	6/8	2.35%	8/8	7.56%

=== 2019 Sri Lankan Presidential Election ===
Party	Medawachchiya		Anuradhapura Electoral District		Sri Lanka	
Party	Votes	%	Votes	%	Votes	%
SLPP	42,287	60.40%	342,223	58.97%	6,924,255	52.25%
NDF	23,423	33.46%	202,348	34.87%	5,564,239	41.99%
NMPP	2,619	3.74%	22,879	3.94%	418,553	3.16%
Other Parties (with < 1%)	1,677	2.40%	12,896	2.22%	345,452	2.61%
Valid Votes	70,006	99.24%	580,346	99.16%	13,252,499	98.99%
Rejected Votes	537	0.76%	4,916	0.84%	135,452	1.01%
Total Polled	70,543	85.85%	585,262	85.76%	13,387,951	83.71%
Registered Electors	82,173		682,450		15,992,568	

=== 2015 Sri Lankan Presidential Election ===
Party	Medawachchiya		Anuradhapura Electoral District		Sri Lanka	
Party	Votes	%	Votes	%	Votes	%
UPFA	35,772	59.01%	281,161	53.59%	5,768,090	47.58%
NDF	24,261	40.02%	238,407	45.44%	6,217,162	51.28%
Other Parties (with < 1%)	587	0.97%	5,065	0.97%	138,200	1.14%
Valid Votes	60,620	99.30%	524,633	99.15%	12,123,452	98.85%
Rejected Votes	426	0.70%	4,500	0.85%	140,925	1.15%
Total Polled	61,046	74.45%	529,133	77.71%	12,264,377	78.69%
Registered Electors	81,996		680,877		15,585,942	

=== 2010 Sri Lankan Presidential Election ===
Party	Medawachchiya		Anuradhapura Electoral District		Sri Lanka	
Party	Votes	%	Votes	%	Votes	%
UPFA	35,996	69.25%	298,448	66.32%	6,015,934	57.88%
NDF	14,971	28.80%	143,761	31.94%	4,173,185	40.15%
Other Parties (with < 1%)	1,015	1.95%	7,829	1.74%	204,494	1.97%
Valid Votes	51,982	99.44%	450,038	99.17%	10,393,613	99.03%
Rejected Votes	293	0.56%	3,785	0.83%	101,838	0.97%
Total Polled	52,275	69.07%	453,823	73.65%	10,495,451	66.70%
Registered Electors	75,683		616,186		15,734,587	

=== 2005 Sri Lankan Presidential Election ===
Party	Medawachchiya		Anuradhapura Electoral District		Sri Lanka	
Party	Votes	%	Votes	%	Votes	%
UPFA	29,071	56.53%	231,040	55.08%	4,887,152	50.29%
UNP	21,647	42.09%	182,956	43.62%	4,706,366	48.43%
Other Parties (with < 1%)	709	1.38%	5,438	1.30%	123,521	1.27%
Valid Votes	51,427	99.14%	419,434	98.92%	9,717,039	98.88%
Rejected Votes	446	0.86%	4,563	1.08%	109,869	1.12%
Total Polled	51,873	72.66%	423,997	75.41%	9,826,908	69.51%
Registered Electors	71,396		562,259		14,136,979	

=== 1999 Sri Lankan Presidential Election ===
Party	Medawachchiya		Anuradhapura Electoral District		Sri Lanka	
Party	Votes	%	Votes	%	Votes	%
PA	24,878	56.13%	189,073	54.14%	4,312,157	51.12%
UNP	16,742	37.77%	139,180	39.86%	3,602,748	42.71%
JVP	1,875	4.23%	14,612	4.18%	343,927	4.08%
Other Parties (with < 1%)	828	1.87%	6,336	1.81%	176,679	2.09%
Valid Votes	44,323	98.35%	349,201	98.05%	8,435,754	97.69%
Rejected Votes	745	1.65%	6,949	1.95%	199,536	2.31%
Total Polled	45,068	72.55%	356,150	75.63%	8,635,290	72.17%
Registered Electors	62,120		470,907		11,965,536	

=== 1994 Sri Lankan Presidential Election ===
Party	Medawachchiya		Anuradhapura Electoral District		Sri Lanka	
Party	Votes	%	Votes	%	Votes	%
PA	25,938	64.95%	200,146	63.99%	4,709,205	62.28%
UNP	13,185	33.01%	107,342	34.32%	2,715,283	35.91%
Other Parties (with < 1%)	414	1.04%	2,775	0.89%	78,152	1.03%
Ind 2	401	1.00%	2,534	0.81%	58,888	0.78%
Valid Votes	39,938	98.36%	312,797	98.05%	7,561,526	98.03%
Rejected Votes	667	1.64%	6,205	1.95%	151,706	1.97%
Total Polled	40,605	72.78%	319,002	76.16%	7,713,232	69.12%
Registered Electors	55,792		418,857		11,158,880	

=== 1988 Sri Lankan Presidential Election ===
Party	Medawachchiya		Anuradhapura Electoral District		Sri Lanka	
Party	Votes	%	Votes	%	Votes	%
SLFP	12,542	58.94%	73,154	55.15%	2,289,857	44.95%
UNP	8,367	39.32%	56,951	42.94%	2,569,199	50.43%
SLMP	371	1.74%	2,529	1.91%	235,701	4.63%
Valid Votes	21,280	97.89%	132,634	98.36%	5,094,754	98.24%
Rejected Votes	459	2.11%	2,207	1.64%	91,499	1.76%
Total Polled	21,739	45.47%	134,841	40.18%	5,186,256	55.87%
Registered Electors	47,805		335,551		9,283,143	

=== 1982 Sri Lankan Presidential Election ===
Party	Medawachchiya		Anuradhapura Electoral District		Sri Lanka	
Party	Votes	%	Votes	%	Votes	%
UNP	16,590	47.89%	117,873	49.84%	3,450,815	52.93%
SLFP	15,079	43.52%	102,973	43.54%	2,546,348	39.05%
JVP	2,749	7.93%	13,911	5.88%	273,428	4.19%
Other Parties (with < 1%)	227	0.66%	1,766	0.75%	249,460	3.83%
Valid Votes	34,645	99.00%	236,523	99.04%	6,520,156	98.78%
Rejected Votes	350	1.00%	2,294	0.96%	80,470	1.22%
Total Polled	34,995	84.40%	238,817	84.68%	6,600,626	80.15%
Registered Electors	41,463		282,018		8,235,358	

== Parliamentary Election Results ==
=== Summary ===
The winner of Medawachchiya has matched the final country result 5 out of 7 times. Hence, Medawachchiya is a Weak Bellwether for Parliamentary Elections.

Year	Medawachchiya	Anuradhapura Electoral District	MAE %	Sri Lanka	MAE %
2015	UPFA	UPFA	0.61%	UNP	3.41%
2010	UPFA	UPFA	4.09%	UPFA	8.93%
2004	UPFA	UPFA	2.33%	UPFA	7.06%
2001	PA	UNP	2.60%	UNP	3.94%
2000	PA	PA	3.35%	PA	4.09%
1994	PA	PA	3.00%	PA	6.15%
1989	UNP	UNP	8.02%	UNP	7.65%
Matches/Mean MAE	5/7	6/7	3.43%	7/7	5.89%

=== 2015 Sri Lankan Parliamentary Election ===
Party	Medawachchiya		Anuradhapura Electoral District		Sri Lanka	
Party	Votes	%	Votes	%	Votes	%
UPFA	26,975	49.51%	229,856	48.39%	4,732,664	42.48%
UNP	24,451	44.87%	213,072	44.85%	5,098,916	45.77%
JVP	2,784	5.11%	28,701	6.04%	544,154	4.88%
Other Parties (with < 1%)	277	0.51%	3,418	0.72%	80,543	0.72%
Valid Votes	54,487	93.48%	475,047	94.28%	11,140,333	95.35%
Rejected Votes	3,757	6.45%	28,462	5.65%	516,926	4.42%
Total Polled	58,287	71.09%	503,845	79.13%	11,684,111	77.66%
Registered Electors	81,996		636,733		15,044,490	

=== 2010 Sri Lankan Parliamentary Election ===
Party	Medawachchiya		Anuradhapura Electoral District		Sri Lanka	
Party	Votes	%	Votes	%	Votes	%
UPFA	26,178	72.03%	221,204	66.52%	4,846,388	60.38%
UNP	8,404	23.12%	80,360	24.17%	2,357,057	29.37%
DNA	1,596	4.39%	18,129	5.45%	441,251	5.50%
Other Parties (with < 1%)	167	0.46%	12,845	3.86%	30,824	0.38%
Valid Votes	36,345	92.94%	332,538	93.55%	8,026,322	96.03%
Rejected Votes	2,759	7.06%	22,930	6.45%	581,465	6.96%
Total Polled	39,104	51.67%	355,468	57.35%	8,358,246	59.29%
Registered Electors	75,683		619,845		14,097,690	

=== 2004 Sri Lankan Parliamentary Election ===
Party	Medawachchiya		Anuradhapura Electoral District		Sri Lanka	
Party	Votes	%	Votes	%	Votes	%
UPFA	27,978	60.07%	212,943	57.22%	4,223,126	45.70%
UNP	17,809	38.24%	148,612	39.94%	3,486,792	37.73%
JHU	484	1.04%	8,034	2.16%	552,723	5.98%
Other Parties (with < 1%)	302	0.65%	2,536	0.68%	51,070	0.55%
Valid Votes	46,573	95.18%	372,125	94.59%	9,241,931	94.52%
Rejected Votes	2,361	4.82%	21,281	5.41%	534,452	5.47%
Total Polled	48,934	71.02%	393,406	76.52%	9,777,821	75.74%
Registered Electors	68,897		514,149		12,909,631	

=== 2001 Sri Lankan Parliamentary Election ===
Party	Medawachchiya		Anuradhapura Electoral District		Sri Lanka	
Party	Votes	%	Votes	%	Votes	%
PA	20,390	44.78%	149,393	41.57%	3,330,815	37.19%
UNP	19,763	43.40%	165,055	45.93%	4,086,026	45.62%
JVP	4,647	10.21%	40,005	11.13%	815,353	9.10%
NLF	543	1.19%	3,279	0.91%	45,901	0.51%
Other Parties (with < 1%)	193	0.42%	1,612	0.45%	62,809	0.70%
Valid Votes	45,536	95.22%	359,344	94.78%	8,955,844	94.77%
Rejected Votes	2,284	4.78%	19,796	5.22%	494,009	5.23%
Total Polled	47,820	72.56%	379,140	77.41%	9,449,878	76.03%
Registered Electors	65,903		489,776		12,428,762	

=== 2000 Sri Lankan Parliamentary Election ===
Party	Medawachchiya		Anuradhapura Electoral District		Sri Lanka	
Party	Votes	%	Votes	%	Votes	%
PA	23,108	52.83%	169,424	48.30%	3,899,329	45.33%
UNP	16,896	38.62%	144,662	41.24%	3,451,765	40.12%
JVP	2,255	5.15%	21,274	6.06%	518,725	6.03%
Other Parties (with < 1%)	784	1.79%	6,042	1.72%	245,927	2.86%
NUA	701	1.60%	9,369	2.67%	185,593	2.16%
Valid Votes	43,744	N/A	350,771	N/A	8,602,617	N/A

=== 1994 Sri Lankan Parliamentary Election ===
Party	Medawachchiya		Anuradhapura Electoral District		Sri Lanka	
Party	Votes	%	Votes	%	Votes	%
PA	25,041	58.26%	180,454	55.19%	3,887,805	48.94%
UNP	17,389	40.46%	142,084	43.45%	3,498,370	44.04%
Other Parties (with < 1%)	549	1.28%	4,446	1.36%	158,616	2.00%
Valid Votes	42,979	96.10%	326,984	95.72%	7,943,688	95.20%
Rejected Votes	1,746	3.90%	14,620	4.28%	400,395	4.80%
Total Polled	44,725	80.16%	341,604	81.54%	8,344,095	74.75%
Registered Electors	55,792		418,959		11,163,064	

=== 1989 Sri Lankan Parliamentary Election ===
Party	Medawachchiya		Anuradhapura Electoral District		Sri Lanka	
Party	Votes	%	Votes	%	Votes	%
UNP	15,324	64.84%	92,726	56.39%	2,838,005	50.71%
SLFP	7,228	30.58%	64,010	38.92%	1,785,369	31.90%
IND	556	2.35%	4,057	2.47%	12,285	0.22%
Other Parties (with < 1%)	527	2.23%	3,652	2.22%	300,186	5.36%
Valid Votes	23,635	94.01%	164,445	92.03%	5,596,468	93.87%
Rejected Votes	1,505	5.99%	14,245	7.97%	365,563	6.13%
Total Polled	25,140	53.53%	178,690	53.49%	5,962,031	63.60%
Registered Electors	46,968		334,073		9,374,164	

== Demographics ==
=== Ethnicity ===
The Medawachchiya Polling Division has a Sinhalese majority (94.3%) . In comparison, the Anuradhapura Electoral District (which contains the Medawachchiya Polling Division) has a Sinhalese majority (91.0%)

Ethnicity in Medawachchiya
1. Sinhalese (94.3%)
2. Moor (5.30%)
3. Other (0.40%)

=== Religion ===
The Medawachchiya Polling Division has a Buddhist majority (93.8%) . In comparison, the Anuradhapura Electoral District (which contains the Medawachchiya Polling Division) has a Buddhist majority (90.1%)

Religion in Medawachchiya
1. Buddhist (93.8%)
2. Muslim (5.40%)
3. Other (0.80%)
