= Administrative divisions of Sri Lanka =

- Administrative map of Sri Lanka
- Location: Sri Lanka
Subdivisions
- - Type: Number
  - Provinces: 9
  - Districts: 25
  - DS Divisions: 331
  - GN Divisions: 14,022

Sri Lanka is divided into 9 provinces, which are further subdivided into 25 districts. Districts are further subdivided into Divisional Secretary's Divisions. Each DS Division is divided into Grama Niladhari Divisions (village officer divisions).

== History ==
The country was first divided into several administrative units during the Anuradhapura Kingdom. The kingdom was divided into three provinces; Rajarata, Ruhuna and Malaya Rata. These were further subdivided into smaller units called rata. Over time, the number of provinces increased, but the second-level administrative division continued to be the rata. However, with the country eventually being divided into more than one kingdom and with foreign colonial missions landing and taking parts of the country under their control, this structure began to change. The territory of the Kotte Kingdom was organized into four disavas, which were further subdivided into forty korales. The korales had their own civil and military officials with a small militia. The Jaffna kingdom appears to have had a similar administrative structure to this with four provinces.

When the Portuguese took over parts of the country after their arrival in 1505, they maintained more or less the same administrative structure followed by Sri Lankan rulers. During the Dutch rule in the country, the terrain under their control was divided into three administrative divisions. These were subdivided into disavas as in earlier systems. The British initially continued this system, but following reforms in 1796 to 1802, the country was divided according to ethnic composition. This was abolished by the Colebrook–Cameron reforms in 1833 and a legislative council was created, making the island a politically and administratively single unit. Five provinces were created, later expanded into nine, and these were subdivided into twenty-one districts. These districts were administered by officials known as Government Agents or Assistant Government Agents.

In 1955, the district replaced the province as the country's main administrative unit. Ampara District was created in April 1961, followed by the creation of Mullaitivu and Gampaha districts in September 1978 through a new constitution, which also reintroduced the province as the main administrative unit. The last district to be created was Kilinochchi in February 1984, and the current constitution (that of 1978) states that the territory of Sri Lanka consists of 25 administrative districts. These districts may be subdivided or amalgamated by a resolution of the Parliament of Sri Lanka.

== Summary ==
| Level | Group name | Type | No. |
|---|---|---|---|
| 1 | Provinces පළාත மாகாணம் | N/A | 9 |
| 2 | Districts දිස්ත්‍රි‌ක්‌ක மாவட்டம் | N/A | 25 |
| 3 | Divisional Secretary's Divisions | N/A | 339 |
| 4 | Grama Niladhari Divisions | N/A | 14,022 |

== List of subdivisions ==
=== Provinces ===
Provinces are first level administrative divisions in Sri Lanka. They were first established by the British rulers of Ceylon in 1833. Over the next century most of the administrative functions were transferred to the districts, the second level administrative division. By the middle of the 20th century, the provinces had become merely ceremonial. This changed in 1987 when, following several decades of increasing demand for a decentralization, the 13th Amendment to the 1978 Constitution of Sri Lanka established provincial councils. Currently there are nine provinces.

| Map | Code | Name | Area (km^{2}) | Population | Website |
|---|---|---|---|---|---|
| | CP | Central Province | 5,674 | 2,556,774 | cp.gov.lk |
| | EP | Eastern Province | 9,996 | 1,547,377 | ep.gov.lk |
| | NC | North Central Province | 10,714 | 1,259,421 | nc.gov.lk |
| | NP | Northern Province | 8,884 | 1,060,023 | np.gov.lk |
| | NW | North Western Province | 7,812 | 2,372,185 | nw.gov.lk |
| | SG | Sabaragamuwa Province | 4,902 | 1,919,478 | sg.gov.lk |
| | SP | Southern Province | 5,559 | 2,465,626 | sp.gov.lk |
| | UP | Uva Province | 8,488 | 1,259,419 | up.gov.lk |
| | WP | Western Province | 3,709 | 5,837,294 | wpc.gov.lk |

=== Districts ===
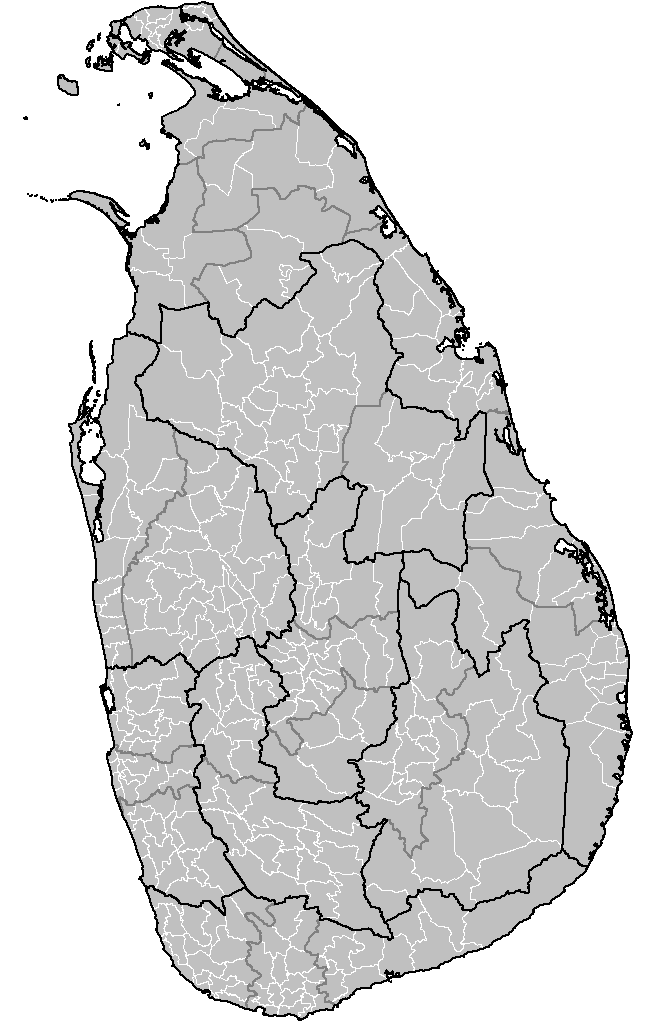
A map of all Sri Lankan Provinces, Districts, and Divisional Secretary's Division.

Districts are the second-level administrative divisions. There are 25 districts organized into 9 provinces. Each district is administered under a District Secretary, who is appointed by the central government. The main tasks of the District Secretariat involve coordinating communications and activities of the central government and Divisional Secretariats. The District Secretariat is also responsible for implementing and monitoring development projects at the district level and assisting lower-level subdivisions in their activities, as well as revenue collection and coordination of elections in the district. A district is divided into a number of Divisional Secretary's Divisions (commonly known as DS divisions), which are in turn subdivided into Grama Niladhari Divisions. There are 256 DS divisions in the country.

== See also ==
- List of capitals in Sri Lanka
- List of cities in Sri Lanka
- List of towns in Sri Lanka

== Bibliography ==
- "Administrative Districts and Main Towns of Sri Lanka". International Centre for Ethnic Studies. Archived from the original on 2009-06-08.
- Siriweera, W. I. (2004). History of Sri Lanka: From Earliest Times Up to the Sixteenth Century. Dayawansa Jayakodi & Company. ISBN 955-551-257-4.
- Yogasundaram, Nath (2006). A Comprehensive History of Sri Lanka from Prehistory to Tsunami. Vijitha Yapa Publishers. ISBN 978-955-665-002-0.
- Peebles, Patrick (2006). The History of Sri Lanka. Greenwood Publishing Group. ISBN 0-313-33205-3.
