= Kalawewa Polling Division =

Kalawewa
- Polling Division
- Coordinates: 8.127574°N 80.316343°E
- Country: Sri Lanka
- Province: North Central Province, Sri Lanka
- Electoral District: Anuradhapura Electoral District

Area
  - Total: 577.7 km^{2} (223.1 sq mi)

Population (2012)
  - Total: 168,529
  - Density: 292/km^{2} (760/sq mi)
- ISO 3166 code: EC-17E

The Kalawewa Polling Division is a Polling Division in the Anuradhapura Electoral District, in the North Central Province, Sri Lanka.

== Presidential Election Results ==
=== Summary ===
The winner of Kalawewa has matched the final country result 6 out of 8 times. Hence, Kalawewa is a Weak Bellwether for Presidential Elections.

Year	Kalawewa	Anuradhapura Electoral District	MAE %	Sri Lanka	MAE %
2019	SLPP	SLPP	1.82%	SLPP	8.35%
2015	UPFA	UPFA	2.32%	NDF	8.17%
2010	UPFA	UPFA	1.83%	UPFA	10.00%
2005	UPFA	UPFA	1.86%	UPFA	6.60%
1999	PA	PA	5.93%	PA	8.68%
1994	PA	PA	5.78%	PA	7.41%
1988	SLFP	SLFP	5.52%	UNP	13.87%
1982	UNP	UNP	0.89%	UNP	4.32%
Matches/Mean MAE	6/8	6/8	3.24%	8/8	8.43%

=== 2019 Sri Lankan Presidential Election ===
Party	Kalawewa		Anuradhapura Electoral District		Sri Lanka	
Party	Votes	%	Votes	%	Votes	%
SLPP	63,306	60.89%	342,223	58.97%	6,924,255	52.25%
NDF	34,215	32.91%	202,348	34.87%	5,564,239	41.99%
NMPP	4,023	3.87%	22,879	3.94%	418,553	3.16%
Other Parties (with < 1%)	2,416	2.32%	12,896	2.22%	345,452	2.61%
Valid Votes	103,960	99.26%	580,346	99.16%	13,252,499	98.99%
Rejected Votes	773	0.74%	4,916	0.84%	135,452	1.01%
Total Polled	104,733	84.50%	585,262	85.76%	13,387,951	83.71%
Registered Electors	123,938		682,450		15,992,568	

=== 2015 Sri Lankan Presidential Election ===
Party	Kalawewa		Anuradhapura Electoral District		Sri Lanka	
Party	Votes	%	Votes	%	Votes	%
UPFA	54,008	55.92%	281,161	53.59%	5,768,090	47.58%
NDF	41,612	43.09%	238,407	45.44%	6,217,162	51.28%
Other Parties (with < 1%)	960	0.99%	5,065	0.97%	138,200	1.14%
Valid Votes	96,580	99.21%	524,633	99.15%	12,123,452	98.85%
Rejected Votes	771	0.79%	4,500	0.85%	140,925	1.15%
Total Polled	97,351	77.78%	529,133	77.71%	12,264,377	78.69%
Registered Electors	125,162		680,877		15,585,942	

=== 2010 Sri Lankan Presidential Election ===
Party	Kalawewa		Anuradhapura Electoral District		Sri Lanka	
Party	Votes	%	Votes	%	Votes	%
UPFA	57,967	68.20%	298,448	66.32%	6,015,934	57.88%
NDF	25,591	30.11%	143,761	31.94%	4,173,185	40.15%
Other Parties (with < 1%)	1,441	1.70%	7,829	1.74%	204,494	1.97%
Valid Votes	84,999	99.24%	450,038	99.17%	10,393,613	99.03%
Rejected Votes	650	0.76%	3,785	0.83%	101,838	0.97%
Total Polled	85,649	74.30%	453,823	73.65%	10,495,451	66.70%
Registered Electors	115,275		616,186		15,734,587	

=== 2005 Sri Lankan Presidential Election ===
Party	Kalawewa		Anuradhapura Electoral District		Sri Lanka	
Party	Votes	%	Votes	%	Votes	%
UPFA	46,073	56.97%	231,040	55.08%	4,887,152	50.29%
UNP	33,758	41.74%	182,956	43.62%	4,706,366	48.43%
Other Parties (with < 1%)	1,048	1.30%	5,438	1.30%	123,521	1.27%
Valid Votes	80,879	98.98%	419,434	98.92%	9,717,039	98.88%
Rejected Votes	836	1.02%	4,563	1.08%	109,869	1.12%
Total Polled	81,715	76.57%	423,997	75.41%	9,826,908	69.51%
Registered Electors	106,717		562,259		14,136,979	

=== 1999 Sri Lankan Presidential Election ===
Party	Kalawewa		Anuradhapura Electoral District		Sri Lanka	
Party	Votes	%	Votes	%	Votes	%
PA	42,154	60.42%	189,073	54.14%	4,312,157	51.12%
UNP	23,388	33.52%	139,180	39.86%	3,602,748	42.71%
JVP	2,845	4.08%	14,612	4.18%	343,927	4.08%
Other Parties (with < 1%)	1,378	1.98%	6,336	1.81%	176,679	2.09%
Valid Votes	69,765	97.89%	349,201	98.05%	8,435,754	97.69%
Rejected Votes	1,503	2.11%	6,949	1.95%	199,536	2.31%
Total Polled	71,268	78.64%	356,150	75.63%	8,635,290	72.17%
Registered Electors	90,631		470,907		11,965,536	

=== 1994 Sri Lankan Presidential Election ===
Party	Kalawewa		Anuradhapura Electoral District		Sri Lanka	
Party	Votes	%	Votes	%	Votes	%
PA	42,661	69.82%	200,146	63.99%	4,709,205	62.28%
UNP	17,331	28.36%	107,342	34.32%	2,715,283	35.91%
Other Parties (with < 1%)	1,108	1.81%	5,309	1.70%	137,040	1.81%
Valid Votes	61,100	97.91%	312,797	98.05%	7,561,526	98.03%
Rejected Votes	1,304	2.09%	6,205	1.95%	151,706	1.97%
Total Polled	62,404	78.31%	319,002	76.16%	7,713,232	69.12%
Registered Electors	79,687		418,857		11,158,880	

=== 1988 Sri Lankan Presidential Election ===
Party	Kalawewa		Anuradhapura Electoral District		Sri Lanka	
Party	Votes	%	Votes	%	Votes	%
SLFP	14,637	60.50%	73,154	55.15%	2,289,857	44.95%
UNP	8,947	36.98%	56,951	42.94%	2,569,199	50.43%
SLMP	611	2.53%	2,529	1.91%	235,701	4.63%
Valid Votes	24,195	98.51%	132,634	98.36%	5,094,754	98.24%
Rejected Votes	365	1.49%	2,207	1.64%	91,499	1.76%
Total Polled	24,560	37.24%	134,841	40.18%	5,186,256	55.87%
Registered Electors	65,945		335,551		9,283,143	

=== 1982 Sri Lankan Presidential Election ===
Party	Kalawewa		Anuradhapura Electoral District		Sri Lanka	
Party	Votes	%	Votes	%	Votes	%
UNP	22,467	49.19%	117,873	49.84%	3,450,815	52.93%
SLFP	20,442	44.75%	102,973	43.54%	2,546,348	39.05%
JVP	2,410	5.28%	13,911	5.88%	273,428	4.19%
Other Parties (with < 1%)	359	0.79%	1,766	0.75%	249,460	3.83%
Valid Votes	45,678	98.97%	236,523	99.04%	6,520,156	98.78%
Rejected Votes	474	1.03%	2,294	0.96%	80,470	1.22%
Total Polled	46,152	84.28%	238,817	84.68%	6,600,626	80.15%
Registered Electors	54,762		282,018		8,235,358	

== Parliamentary Election Results ==
=== Summary ===
The winner of Kalawewa has matched the final country result 5 out of 7 times. Hence, Kalawewa is a Weak Bellwether for Parliamentary Elections.

Year	Kalawewa	Anuradhapura Electoral District	MAE %	Sri Lanka	MAE %
2015	UPFA	UPFA	3.81%	UNP	6.49%
2010	UPFA	UPFA	3.15%	UPFA	7.96%
2004	UPFA	UPFA	2.50%	UPFA	6.81%
2001	PA	UNP	3.75%	UNP	5.23%
2000	PA	PA	3.86%	PA	4.59%
1994	PA	PA	4.04%	PA	7.12%
1989	UNP	UNP	7.66%	UNP	6.01%
Matches/Mean MAE	5/7	6/7	4.11%	7/7	6.31%

=== 2015 Sri Lankan Parliamentary Election ===
Party	Kalawewa		Anuradhapura Electoral District		Sri Lanka	
Party	Votes	%	Votes	%	Votes	%
UPFA	45,236	52.82%	229,856	48.39%	4,732,664	42.48%
UNP	35,318	41.24%	213,072	44.85%	5,098,916	45.77%
JVP	4,623	5.40%	28,701	6.04%	544,154	4.88%
Other Parties (with < 1%)	462	0.54%	3,418	0.72%	80,543	0.72%
Valid Votes	85,639	93.93%	475,047	94.28%	11,140,333	95.35%
Rejected Votes	5,485	6.02%	28,462	5.65%	516,926	4.42%
Total Polled	91,177	72.85%	503,845	79.13%	11,684,111	77.66%
Registered Electors	125,162		636,733		15,044,490	

=== 2010 Sri Lankan Parliamentary Election ===
Party	Kalawewa		Anuradhapura Electoral District		Sri Lanka	
Party	Votes	%	Votes	%	Votes	%
UPFA	42,905	70.96%	221,204	66.52%	4,846,388	60.38%
UNP	14,662	24.25%	80,360	24.17%	2,357,057	29.37%
DNA	2,583	4.27%	18,129	5.45%	441,251	5.50%
Other Parties (with < 1%)	315	0.52%	12,845	3.86%	30,824	0.38%
Valid Votes	60,465	93.62%	332,538	93.55%	8,026,322	96.03%
Rejected Votes	4,124	6.38%	22,930	6.45%	581,465	6.96%
Total Polled	64,589	56.03%	355,468	57.35%	8,358,246	59.29%
Registered Electors	115,275		619,845		14,097,690	

=== 2004 Sri Lankan Parliamentary Election ===
Party	Kalawewa		Anuradhapura Electoral District		Sri Lanka	
Party	Votes	%	Votes	%	Votes	%
UPFA	42,639	59.95%	212,943	57.22%	4,223,126	45.70%
UNP	26,744	37.60%	148,612	39.94%	3,486,792	37.73%
JHU	1,314	1.85%	8,034	2.16%	552,723	5.98%
Other Parties (with < 1%)	426	0.60%	2,536	0.68%	51,070	0.55%
Valid Votes	71,123	94.11%	372,125	94.59%	9,241,931	94.52%
Rejected Votes	4,454	5.89%	21,281	5.41%	534,452	5.47%
Total Polled	75,577	73.99%	393,406	76.52%	9,777,821	75.74%
Registered Electors	102,138		514,149		12,909,631	

=== 2001 Sri Lankan Parliamentary Election ===
Party	Kalawewa		Anuradhapura Electoral District		Sri Lanka	
Party	Votes	%	Votes	%	Votes	%
PA	31,042	45.47%	149,393	41.57%	3,330,815	37.19%
UNP	28,282	41.43%	165,055	45.93%	4,086,026	45.62%
JVP	7,947	11.64%	40,005	11.13%	815,353	9.10%
NLF	686	1.00%	3,279	0.91%	45,901	0.51%
Other Parties (with < 1%)	310	0.45%	1,612	0.45%	62,809	0.70%
Valid Votes	68,267	93.95%	359,344	94.78%	8,955,844	94.77%
Rejected Votes	4,398	6.05%	19,796	5.22%	494,009	5.23%
Total Polled	72,665	74.82%	379,140	77.41%	9,449,878	76.03%
Registered Electors	97,120		489,776		12,428,762	

=== 2000 Sri Lankan Parliamentary Election ===
Party	Kalawewa		Anuradhapura Electoral District		Sri Lanka	
Party	Votes	%	Votes	%	Votes	%
PA	35,026	52.83%	169,424	48.30%	3,899,329	45.33%
UNP	24,754	37.34%	144,662	41.24%	3,451,765	40.12%
JVP	4,303	6.49%	21,274	6.06%	518,725	6.03%
Other Parties (with < 1%)	1,382	2.08%	6,042	1.72%	245,927	2.86%
NUA	834	1.26%	9,369	2.67%	185,593	2.16%
Valid Votes	66,299	N/A	350,771	N/A	8,602,617	N/A

=== 1994 Sri Lankan Parliamentary Election ===
Party	Kalawewa		Anuradhapura Electoral District		Sri Lanka	
Party	Votes	%	Votes	%	Votes	%
PA	37,744	59.34%	180,454	55.19%	3,887,805	48.94%
UNP	25,091	39.45%	142,084	43.45%	3,498,370	44.04%
Other Parties (with < 1%)	767	1.21%	4,446	1.36%	158,616	2.00%
Valid Votes	63,602	95.27%	326,984	95.72%	7,943,688	95.20%
Rejected Votes	3,160	4.73%	14,620	4.28%	400,395	4.80%
Total Polled	66,762	83.78%	341,604	81.54%	8,344,095	74.75%
Registered Electors	79,687		418,959		11,163,064	

=== 1989 Sri Lankan Parliamentary Election ===
Party	Kalawewa		Anuradhapura Electoral District		Sri Lanka	
Party	Votes	%	Votes	%	Votes	%
UNP	14,940	48.64%	92,726	56.39%	2,838,005	50.71%
SLFP	14,522	47.28%	64,010	38.92%	1,785,369	31.90%
USA	438	1.43%	1,724	1.05%	141,983	2.54%
IND	404	1.32%	4,057	2.47%	12,285	0.22%
ELJP	333	1.08%	1,397	0.85%	67,723	1.21%
Other Parties (with < 1%)	79	0.26%	531	0.32%	90,480	1.62%
Valid Votes	30,716	89.62%	164,445	92.03%	5,596,468	93.87%
Rejected Votes	3,557	10.38%	14,245	7.97%	365,563	6.13%
Total Polled	34,273	52.35%	178,690	53.49%	5,962,031	63.60%
Registered Electors	65,472		334,073		9,374,164	

== Demographics ==
=== Ethnicity ===
The Kalawewa Polling Division has a Sinhalese majority (97.4%) . In comparison, the Anuradhapura Electoral District (which contains the Kalawewa Polling Division) has a Sinhalese majority (91.0%)

Ethnicity in Kalawewa
1. Sinhalese (97.4%)
2. Moor (1.70%)
3. Other (0.80%)

=== Religion ===
The Kalawewa Polling Division has a Buddhist majority (96.7%) . In comparison, the Anuradhapura Electoral District (which contains the Kalawewa Polling Division) has a Buddhist majority (90.1%)

Religion in Kalawewa
1. Buddhist (96.7%)
2. Muslim (1.70%)
3. Other (1.60%)
