= Nuwaragam Palatha East Divisional Secretariat =

- Divisional Secretariat
- Country: Sri Lanka
- Province: North Central Province
- District: Anuradhapura District
- Time zone: UTC+5:30 (Sri Lanka Standard Time)

Nuwaragam Palatha East Divisional Secretariat is a Divisional Secretariat of Anuradhapura District, of North Central Province, Sri Lanka.

== Demography-Religion ==
Religion in Nuwaragam Palatha East DS Division (2012)
1. Buddhist (92.8%)
2. Hindu (0.50%)
3. Muslim (4.50%)
4. Roman Catholic (1.70%)
5. Other Christian (0.50%)
6. Other (0.00%)
