= Nachchadoowa Divisional Secretariat =

- Divisional Secretariat
- Interactive map of Nachchadoowa Divisional Secretariat
- Country: Sri Lanka
- Province: North Central Province
- District: Anuradhapura District
- Time zone: UTC+5:30 (Sri Lanka Standard Time)

Nachchadoowa Divisional Secretariat is a Divisional Secretariat of Anuradhapura District, of North Central Province, Sri Lanka.

== Demography-Religion ==
Religion in Nachchadoowa DS Division (2012)
1. Buddhist (85.9%)
2. Hindu (0.10%)
3. Muslim (13.3%)
4. Roman Catholic (0.40%)
5. Other Christian (0.30%)
6. Other (0.00%)
