= Palugaswewa Divisional Secretariat =

- Divisional Secretariat
- Interactive map of Palugaswewa Divisional Secretariat
- Country: Sri Lanka
- Province: North Central Province
- District: Anuradhapura District
- Time zone: UTC+5:30 (Sri Lanka Standard Time)

Palugaswewa Divisional Secretariat is a Divisional Secretariat of Anuradhapura District, of North Central Province, Sri Lanka.

Religion in Palugaswewa DS Division (2012)
1. Buddhist (97.9%)
2. Hindu (0.40%)
3. Muslim (0.00%)
4. Roman Catholic (1.10%)
5. Other Christian (0.50%)
6. Other (0.00%)
