= Avukana Buddha statue =

5th-century Buddhist sculpture

Avukana Buddha Statue
- Sinhala: අවුකන බුද්ධ ප්‍රතිමාව
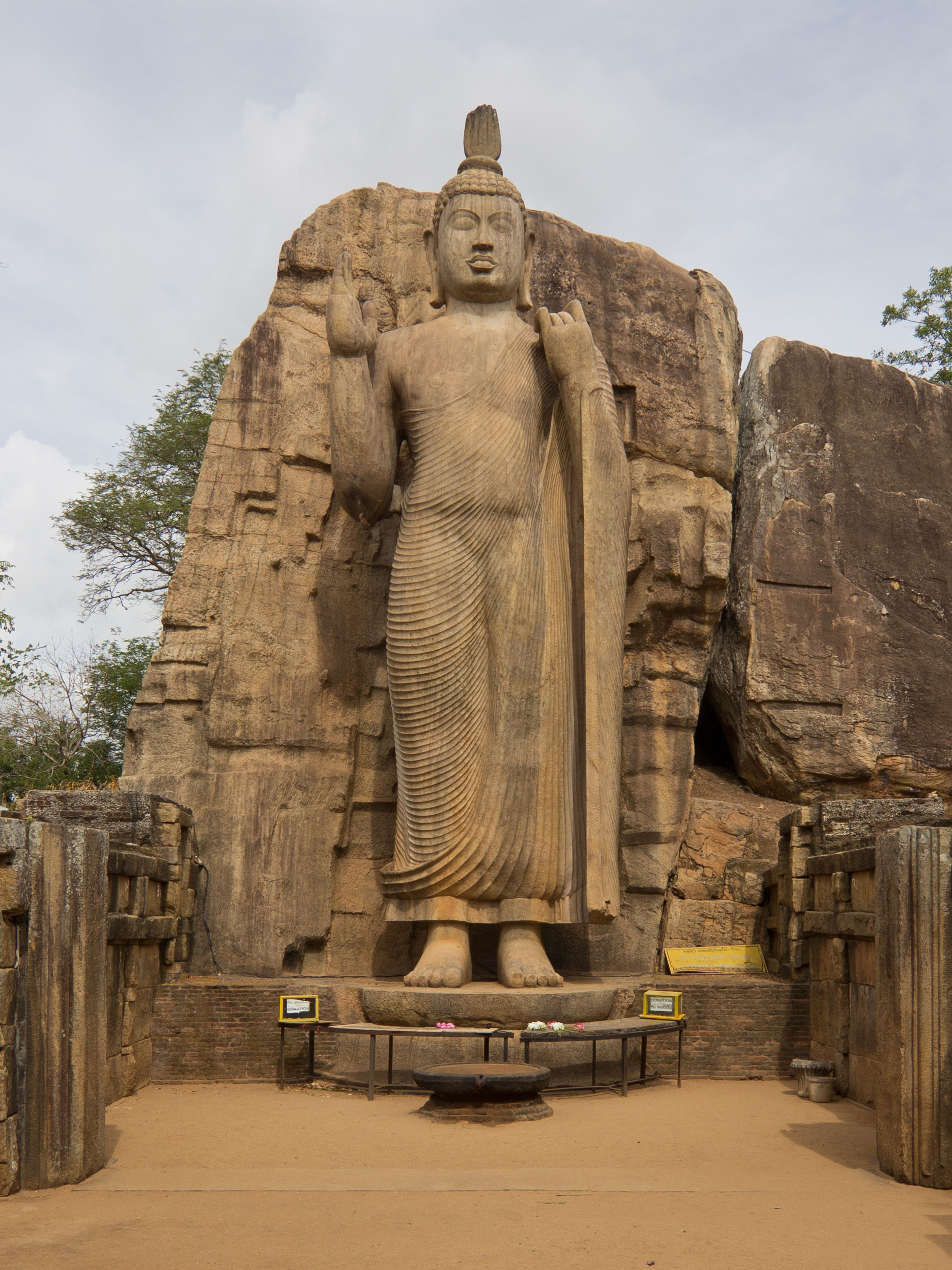

- Location within Sri Lanka
- Year: 5th century
- Type: Stone sculpture
- Medium: Granite
- Dimensions: 11.84 m (38.8 ft)
- Location: Kekirawa, Sri Lanka; 8°0′39.1″N 80°30′45.6″E

Archaeological Protected Monument of Sri Lanka
- Website: aukana.org

The Avukana statue is a standing statue of the Buddha near Kekirawa in North Central Sri Lanka. The statue, which has a height of more than 14 m (46 ft), depicts the Buddha with a hand raised in reassurance, a variation of the Abhaya mudra. The Avukana statue is one of the best examples of a standing statue built in Sri Lanka. It is now a popular tourist attraction.

== Location and appearance ==
The Avukana statue is located in the village of Avukana (also spelled Aukana) (Sinhala : අවුකන) near Kekirawa. The figure is set within a shallow niche and faces east, gazing toward the Kala Wewa reservoir. Carved from a large granite rock face,the statue remains partially attached to the rock by a narrow strip left at the back for support it. The surface behind the image has been shaped to resemble Cyclopean masonry, creating the impression of a mountain backdrop. The pedestal on which the Buddha stands takes the form of a lotus flower. The statue alone is 11.84 metres (38 ft 10 in) in height, and with the pedestal, the total height of the Avukana statue reaches over 14 metres (46 ft).

The statue was set within a large image house or shrine, of which parts of the lower walls remain. The structure had a stone foundation with the upper portions made of brick. It was 23 metres (74 ft) long and 19 metres (63 ft) wide.

== Characteristics ==
The Avukana statue is considered to be one of the best examples of a standing statue of the Buddha from ancient Sri Lanka. It shows some influence of the Gandhara school of art, as well as the Amaravati School of India. The robe is worn tightly, clearly outlining the shape of the body, and its pleats are carved clearly and delicately. It is worn over the left shoulder, and the right shoulder is bare, as is the tradition in Buddha statues of Sri Lanka. The Buddha's body is straight, and the left-hand clutches the robe at the left shoulder. The right hand is raised to the right shoulder, with the palm facing the left. This position is known as the Asisa mudra, a variation of the Abhaya mudra. Nearing the bottom of the robe, inside of the statue, lies a drawing depicting the tool used to make the statue itself along with writing.

== Dating ==
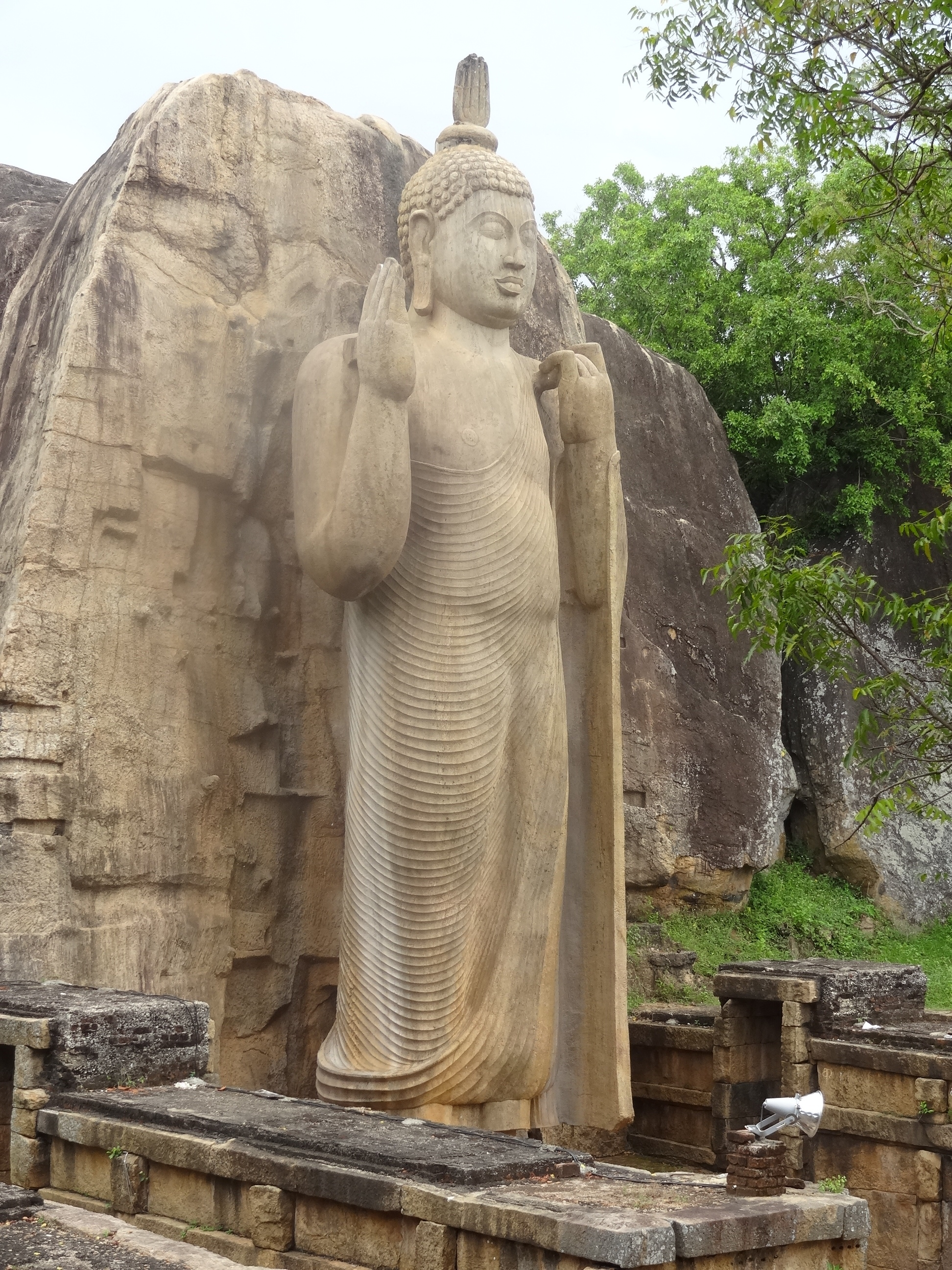
Avukana Buddha Statue 04

The Avukana statue is widely believed to have been constructed in the 5th century, but several opinions have been expressed from the time of Harry Charles Purvis Bell, Ananda Coomaraswamy, and Senarath Paranavithana. A comprehensive review of the evidence, and a close assessment of the sculpture's style, were undertaken by Diran K. Dohanian, who concluded, based on comparisons with Buddhas elsewhere in Sri Lanka and those produced for the Amaravati school, that the Aukana Buddha belongs to the 8th century. This is confirmed by a donative inscription, found in 1951 on the north wall of the shrine, that is written in Sinhala and dates to the 8th century.

== Legends ==
While the statue is often said to have been made at the behest of King Dhatusena, another theory is that it was done by an individual named Barana. There is another nearby standing statue of the Buddha, quite similar to the Avukana statue, at Sasseruwa. According to legend, the two statues are the result of a competition between a stone sculpting guru (master) and a goal (pupil). The story goes that the master constructed the Avukana statue, while the pupil made the statue at Sasseruwa. The first to complete his statue had to notify the other by ringing a bell. The master managed to complete his statue first and won the competition. This is said to be why the Sasseruwa statue is unfinished. The Avukana statue is considered to be the better of the two, and the similarities between them have led historians to believe that the story is true. However, that is a mere legend as the Sasseruwa statue was built nearly four hundred years before the Avukana Buddha image. Reswehera Rajamaha Vihara is an ancient temple that was built by King Devanampiyatissa (307-267 BC).

== Current situation ==
Today, pilgrims visit the statue from all parts of the country and the Avukana statue has become a popular tourist attraction. Although the site lacked many facilities, it has now been improved by the Department of Archaeology and the Civil Defence Force.

== See also ==
- Buduruvagala
- Maligawila Buddha statue
- Samadhi statue
- Toluvila statue
- List of colossal sculptures in situ
