= Thambuttegama Divisional Secretariat =

- Divisional Secretariat
- Interactive map of Thambuttegama Divisional Secretariat
- Country: Sri Lanka
- Province: North Central Province
- District: Anuradhapura District
- Time zone: UTC+5:30 (Sri Lanka Standard Time)

Thambuttegama Divisional Secretariat is a Divisional Secretariat of Anuradhapura District, of North Central Province, Sri Lanka.

Religion in Thambuttegama DS Division (2012)
1. Buddhist (96.8%)
2. Hindu (0.04%)
3. Muslim (0.02%)
4. Roman Catholic (0.81%)
5. Other Christian (2.34%)
6. Other (0.01%)
