= Nochchiyagama Divisional Secretariat =

- Divisional Secretariat
- Interactive map of Nochchiyagama Divisional Secretariat
- Coordinates: 8°19′54″N 80°06′52″E
- Country: Sri Lanka
- Province: North Central Province
- District: Anuradhapura District
- Time zone: UTC+5:30 (Sri Lanka Standard Time)

Nochchiyagama Divisional Secretariat is a Divisional Secretariat of Anuradhapura District, of North Central Province, Sri Lanka.

Religion in Nochchiyagama DS Division (2012)
1. Buddhist (94.0%)
2. Hindu (0.40%)
3. Muslim (4.00%)
4. Roman Catholic (1.30%)
5. Other Christian (0.20%)
6. Other (0.00%)
