= Mihinthale Divisional Secretariat =

- Divisional Secretariat
- Country: Sri Lanka
- Province: North Central Province
- District: Anuradhapura District
- Time zone: UTC+5:30 (Sri Lanka Standard Time)

Mihinthale Divisional Secretariat is a Divisional Secretariat of Anuradhapura District, of North Central Province, Sri Lanka.

Religion in Mihinthale DS Division (2012)
1. Buddhist (93.6%)
2. Hindu (0.24%)
3. Muslim (4.83%)
4. Roman Catholic (0.92%)
5. Other Christian (0.37%)
6. Other (0.00%)
