= Habarana =

Habarana හබරණ அபரணை
- Town
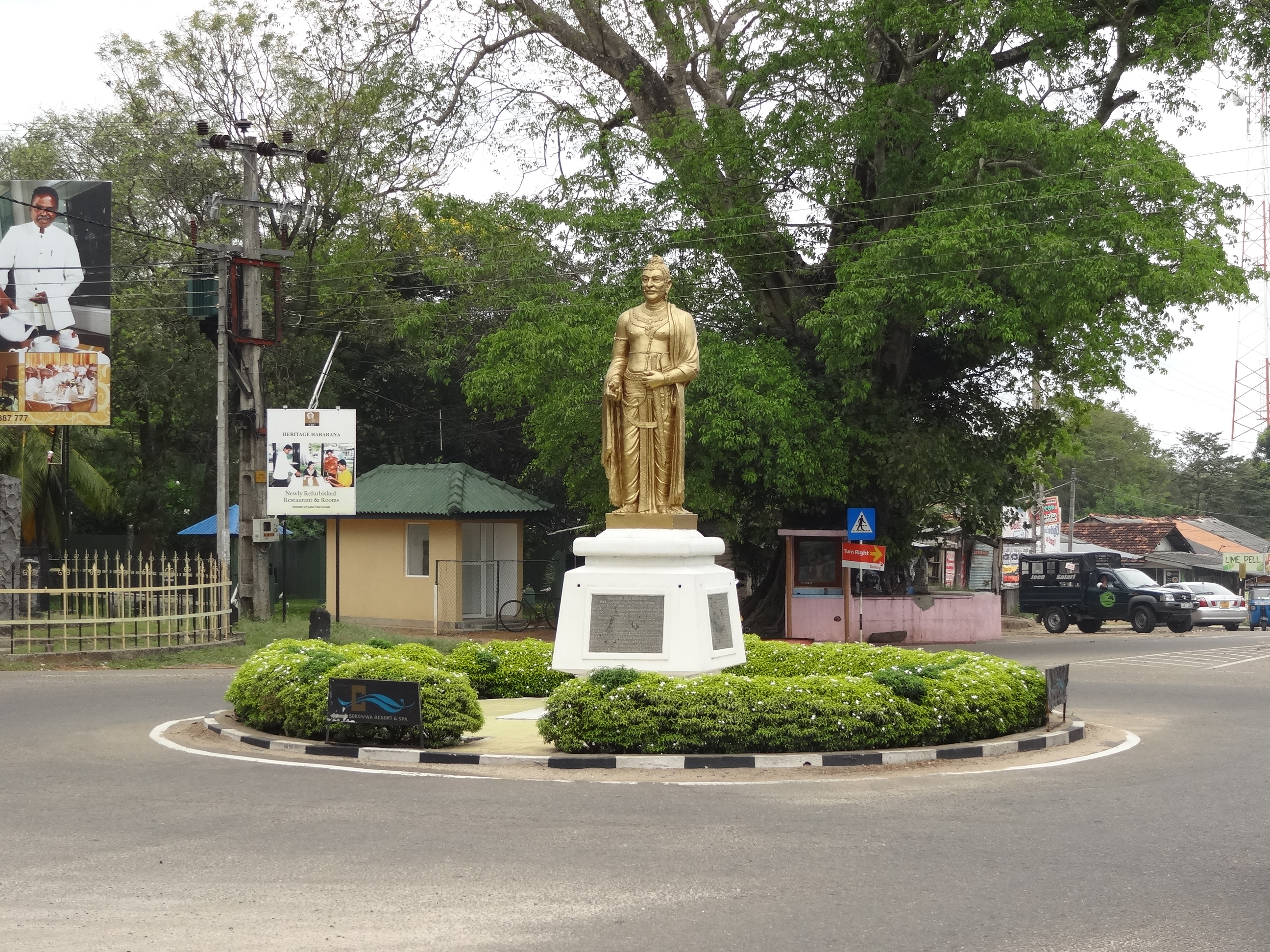

- Location in Sri Lanka
- Coordinates: 8°2′N 80°45′E
- Country: Sri Lanka
- Province: North Central Province
- District: polonnaruwa district
- Time zone: UTC+5:30 (Sri Lanka Standard Time Zone)

Habarana (Sinhala: හබරණ, romanized: Habaraṇa; Tamil: அபரணை, romanized: Aparaṇai) is a small city in the Anuradhapura District of Sri Lanka. The location has some mid-range and up hotels aimed at package tourists, and is a departure point for other nearby locations of greater interest.

Habarana is a popular tourist destination for safari lovers as it is the starting point for safaris in the nearby Habarana jungle and the Minneriya sanctuary which is heavily populated by elephants. Elephant back riding is also an attraction in this small city. Habarana is situated nearby to the ancient rock fortress and castle/palace ruin of Sigiriya and is situated on the main road from Colombo to Trincomalee, Polonnaruwa and Batticaloa. The population of the city is expected to be in the area of 5000–10,000.

The region contains several top-rated national hotels and features natural scenery and wildlife that attract tourism.
