= Horowpothana Divisional Secretariat =

- Divisional Secretariat
- Interactive map of Horowpothana Divisional Secretariat
- Country: Sri Lanka
- Province: North Central Province
- District: Anuradhapura District
- Time zone: UTC+5:30 (Sri Lanka Standard Time)

Horowpothana Divisional Secretariat is a Divisional Secretariat of Anuradhapura District, of North Central Province, Sri Lanka.

"Horowpothana is a town in the country of Sri Lanka. Horowpothana is situated in North Central region of the country. It is in the Anuradapura administrative district, 52 kilometers away from Anuradapura town on Trinco Road.

Horowpothana provides bus connections to Colombo, Anuradhapura, Trincomalee, Vavuniya, and Jaffna. Public services, including the hospital, Divisional Secretariat, Urban Council, banks, bus depot, police station, temple, and church, are located near the town bus stand.

== Demography-Religion ==
Religion in HorowpothanaDS Division (2012)
1. Buddhist (72.9%)
2. Hindu (0.10%)
3. Muslim (26.6%)
4. Roman Catholic (0.20%)
5. Other Christian (0.20%)
6. Other (0.00%)
