= Kahatagasdigiliya Divisional Secretariat =

- Divisional Secretariat
- Interactive map of Kahatagasdigiliya Divisional Secretariat
- Country: Sri Lanka
- Province: North Central Province
- District: Anuradhapura District
- Time zone: UTC+5:30 (Sri Lanka Standard Time)

Kahatagasdigiliya Divisional Secretariat is a Divisional Secretariat of Anuradhapura District, of North Central Province, Sri Lanka.

The geographical position of the Kahatagasdigiliya division between the northern latitudes 8.100-8.350 and the longitude longitudes between 80.450 and 81.010. The divisions of the Kahatagasdigiliya divisional secretariat belonging to the central Nuwaragampalatha are bounded in Mihinthalaya, Galenbindunuwewa, Horowpathana, Rambawewa and Kebithigollewa divisional secretariat divisions.

Kahatagasdigiliya Divisional Secretary's Division of the Anuradhapura District Walking distance of 35.2 km from the Anuradhapura sacred city to the small town center of Kahatagasdigiliya. The total area is 351.99 km and the total population includes 119 villages. It belongs to the Udyiyankulam Koralaya, Kalpe Koralaya and Kanadara Koralaya according to the ancient Korale divisions.

Globally, this divisional secretariat can not be seen to be so large in size and only the Yan Oya flows through this division. Small mountain ranges can not be seen and there are small mountain ranges with many cultural and cultural values of soil. Kokkebe is the highest place in the Kahatagasdigiliya Divisional Secretariat Division. The red brown soil in the area is very favorable. There are 293 small and medium scale tanks in the area and the amount of land that is leached is 6.99 km^{2}.

Agriculture and animal husbandry are the main livelihoods of this division. The village of Loolneva, known as the traditional Baths, is a traditional pottery industry in the Divisional Secretariat, Bethkewa in the traditional handicraft village.

There are many places in Sri Sangabo Viharaya, Heinuggala Ancient Rajamaha Viharaya, Gurugalhinna Archaeological Site, Kokebe Archeological Workshop, Divulwewa Sylabimbarama Viharaya, and Weheragala Archaeological Reserve.

There are 49,747 people from 14,703 families belonging to various ethnic groups Live in harmony this Divisional Secretariat.

== Demography-Religion ==
Religion in Kahatagasdigiliya DS Division (2012)
1. Buddhist (78.8%)
2. Hindu (0.40%)
3. Muslim (20.3%)
4. Roman Catholic (0.30%)
5. Other Christian (0.30%)
6. Other (0.00%)

The Divisional Secretariat provides a priority service to the schools, banks, hospitals, as well as the people of the division. Kahatagasdigiliya Divisional Secretariat has been started in 1976 and has 13 Divisional Secretaries up to date. Now Divisional Secretary is Mr. Sudarshana Dissanayake
