= Mahavilachchiya Divisional Secretariat =

Mahawilachchiya Divisional Secretariat
- Divisional Secretariat
- Location within Sri Lanka
- Country: Sri Lanka
- Province: North Central Province
- District: Anuradhapura District
- Time zone: UTC+5:30 (Sri Lanka Standard Time)

Mahawilachchiya Divisional Secretariat is a Divisional Secretariat of Anuradhapura District, of North Central Province, Sri Lanka. There are 14 public schools in the division.

There are 16 public schools in Mahawilachchiya DS Division. They are,

1. Thakshila Maha Vidyalaya - Bogas Handiya
2. Gamini Vidyalaya - Tract 3
3. Sri Wimalagnana Maha Vidyalaya - Thanthirimale
4. Billewa Vidyalaya
5. Ananda Vidayalaya
6. Dharmapala Maha Vidyalaya - Thambiyawa
7. Maha Kashyapa Vidyalaya
8. Rahula Vidyalaya - Ethdathkalla
9. Sirisangabo Vidyalaya - Wanni Helambewa
10. Ashoka Vidyalaya - Siyambalagaswewa
11. Saliyamala Maha Vidyalaya - Tract 7
12. Siddhartha Maha Vidyalaya - Pemaduwa
13. Seevali Primary Model School - Pemaduwa
14. Dunumandalawa Vidyalaya - Dunumandalawa
15. Ashokamala Vidyalaya - Kadurupitiya

== Demography-Religion ==
Religion in Mahavilachchiya DS Division (2012)
1. Buddhist (98.9%)
2. Hindu (0.00%)
3. Muslim (0.10%)
4. Roman Catholic (0.60%)
5. Other Christian (0.40%)
6. Other (0.00%)
