= Thirappane Divisional Secretariat =

- Divisional Secretariat
- Country: Sri Lanka
- Province: North Central Province
- District: Anuradhapura District
- Time zone: UTC+5:30 (Sri Lanka Standard Time)

Thirappane Divisional Secretariat is a Divisional Secretariat of Anuradhapura District, of North Central Province, Sri Lanka.

== Demography-Religion ==
Religion in Thirappane DS Division (2012)
1. Buddhist (90.8%)
2. Hindu (0.20%)
3. Muslim (6.10%)
4. Roman Catholic (2.70%)
5. Other Christian (0.20%)
6. Other (0.00%)

== Hotels ==
- Ulagalla Resort- Ulagalla is a luxury boutique hotel set on 58 acres 2 km from Thirippane town along the A6 highway. It is owned and managed by UGA Escapes, a subsidiary of FinCo group.
