= Nuwaragam Palatha Central Divisional Secretariat =

- Divisional Secretariat
- Interactive map of Nuwaragam Palatha Central Divisional Secretariat
- Country: Sri Lanka
- Province: North Central Province
- District: Anuradhapura District
- Time zone: UTC+5:30 (Sri Lanka Standard Time)
- Website: www.nuwaragamc.ds.gov.lk

Nuwaragam Palatha Central Divisional Secretariat is a Divisional Secretariat of Anuradhapura District, of North Central Province, Sri Lanka.

== Demography-Religion ==
Religion in Nuwaragam Palatha Central DS Division (2012)
1. Buddhist (88.7%)
2. Hindu (0.70%)
3. Muslim (8.70%)
4. Roman Catholic (1.00%)
5. Other Christian (0.90%)
6. Other (0.00%)
