= Ipalogama Divisional Secretariat =

- Divisional Secretariat
- Interactive map of Ipalogama Divisional Secretariat
- Coordinates: 8°05′24″N 80°30′17″E
- Country: Sri Lanka
- Province: North Central Province
- District: Anuradhapura District
- Time zone: UTC+5:30 (Sri Lanka Standard Time)

Ipalogama Divisional Secretariat is a Divisional Secretariat of Anuradhapura District, of North Central Province, Sri Lanka.

== Demography-Religion ==
Religion in Ipalogama DS Division (2012)
1. Buddhist (84.8%)
2. Hindu (0.30%)
3. Muslim (13.9%)
4. Roman Catholic (0.70%)
5. Other Christian (0.20%)
6. Other (0.00%)
