= Padaviya Divisional Secretariat =

- Divisional Secretariat
- Interactive map of Padaviya Divisional Secretariat
- Coordinates: 8.8322°N 80.7587°E
- Country: Sri Lanka
- Province: North Central Province
- District: Anuradhapura District

Area
  - Total: 92.7 sq mi (240.0 km^{2})

Population (2012)
  - Total: 22,998
  - Density: 248.2/sq mi (95.83/km^{2})
- Time zone: UTC+5:30 (Sri Lanka Standard Time)

Padaviya Divisional Secretariat is a Divisional Secretariat of Anuradhapura District, of North Central Province, Sri Lanka. It serves as the local authority for Padaviya town, which is the main town within the divisional secretariat. Padaviya Divisional Secretariat oversees the administration of Padaviya town and surrounding small towns.

== Padaviya Town ==
In close proximity to the historical Padaviya tank lies the village of Padaviya, the main town within the divisional secretariat. Padaviya is renowned for its ancient irrigation systems dating back to the Anuradhapura era. The village faces contemporary challenges, including water scarcity and health issues, but continues to thrive with a vibrant community and traditional practices. For more information, see the Padaviya page.

== Population and Area Statistics ==
As of the 2012 census, Padaviya Divisional Secretariat has a population of 22,998 with an area of 240 km^{2} (93 sq mi), resulting in a population density of 95.83/km². The annual population change from 2001 to 2012 is recorded at 0.79%.

=== Demography-Religion ===
Religion in Padaviya DS Division (2012)
1. Buddhist (98.8%)
2. Hindu (0.10%)
3. Muslim (0.00%)
4. Roman Catholic (0.90%)
5. Other Christian (0.20%)
6. Other (0.00%)
