= Galenbindunuwewa Divisional Secretariat =

Galenbindunuwewa Divisional Secretari
- Divisional Secretariat
- Country: Sri Lanka
- Province: North Central Province
- District: Anuradhapura District
- Time zone: UTC+5:30 (Sri Lanka Standard Time)
- Website: galenbindunuwewa.ds.gov.lk

Galenbindunuwewa Divisional Secretariat is a Divisional Secretariat of Anuradhapura District, of North Central Province, Sri Lanka.

== Demography-Religion ==
Religion in Galenbindunuwewa DS Division (2012)
1. Buddhist (96.7%)
2. Hindu (0.10%)
3. Muslim (3.00%)
4. Roman Catholic (0.10%)
5. Other Christian (0.10%)
6. Other (0.00%)
