= Kekirawa Divisional Secretariat =

Divisional Secretariat in North Central Province, Sri Lanka

- Divisional Secretariat
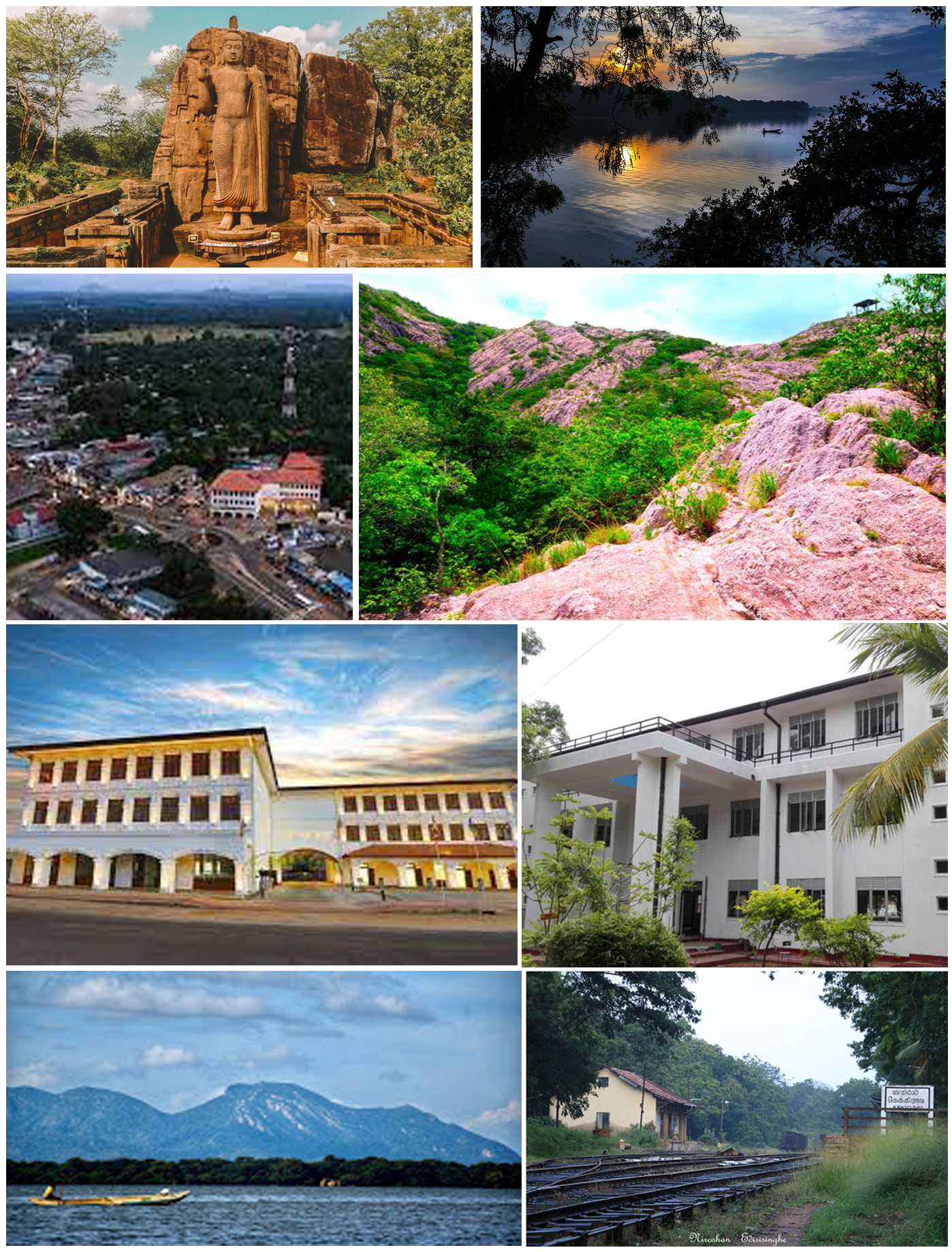
- From top, left to right: Avukana Buddha statue, Kala wewa, Kekirawa skyview, Namal Uyana, Kekirawa, Kekirawa Central College, Ritigala mountain range and Keriwara railway station
- Interactive map of Kekirawa Divisional Secretariat
- Country: Sri Lanka
- Province: North Central Province
- District: Anuradhapura District

Area
  - Total: 586.87 km^{2} (226.59 sq mi)
- Elevation: 146 m (479 ft)

Population (2012)
  - Total: 59,241
  - Density: 100.94/km^{2} (261.44/sq mi)
- Time zone: UTC+5:30 (Sri Lanka Standard Time)
- Postal code: 50100
- Website: www.soslc.lk/si/cities/kekirawa-pradeshiya-sabha

Kekirawa Divisional Secretariat is a Divisional Secretariat in the Anuradhapura District, North Central Province, Sri Lanka. According to the 2012 Census, the division has a population of 59,241.

== History ==
The Kekirawa region contains archaeological sites dating back to the prehistoric era, most notably in the vicinity of the Ritigala mountain range. Ritigala is a noted nature reserve and archaeological site containing the ruins of a monastery complex established around the 1st century BCE.

== Demography ==
The population is predominantly Sinhalese, with a significant Sri Lankan Moors minority. Demographic statistics are based on the 2012 Census.

Religion in Kekirawa DS Division (2012)
1. Buddhist (77.9%)
2. Hindu (2.10%)
3. Muslim (18.6%)
4. Roman Catholic (0.80%)
5. Other Christian (0.60%)
