= Thalawa Divisional Secretariat =

- Divisional Secretariat
- Interactive map of Thalawa Divisional Secretariat
- Country: Sri Lanka
- Province: North Central Province
- District: Anuradhapura District
- Time zone: UTC+5:30 (Sri Lanka Standard Time)

Thalawa Divisional Secretariat is a Divisional Secretariat of Anuradhapura District, of North Central Province, Sri Lanka.

Religion in Thalawa DS Division (2012)
1. Buddhist (97.9%)
2. Hindu (0.16%)
3. Muslim (1.07%)
4. Roman Catholic (0.49%)
5. Other Christian (0.42%)
6. Other (0.00%)
