= Medawachchiya Divisional Secretariat =

- Divisional Secretariat
- Interactive map of Medawachchiya Divisional Secretariat
- Country: Sri Lanka
- Province: North Central Province
- District: Anuradhapura District
- Time zone: UTC+5:30 (Sri Lanka Standard Time)

Medawachchiya Divisional Secretariat is a Divisional Secretariat of Anuradhapura District, of North Central Province, Sri Lanka.

== Demography-Religion ==
Religion in Medawachchiya DS Division (2012)
1. Buddhist (92.9%)
2. Muslim (6.20%)
3. Roman Catholic (0.50%)
4. Hindu (0.20%)
5. Other Christian (0.20%)
6. Other (0.10%)
