= ISO 3166-2:LK =

Entry for Sri Lanka in ISO 3166-2

ISO 3166-2:LK is the entry for Sri Lanka in ISO 3166-2, part of the ISO 3166 standard published by the International Organization for Standardization (ISO), which defines codes for the names of the principal subdivisions (e.g., provinces or states) of all countries coded in ISO 3166-1.

Currently for Sri Lanka, ISO 3166-2 codes are defined for two levels of subdivisions:

- nine provinces
- 25 districts

Each code consists of two parts separated by a hyphen. The first part is LK, the ISO 3166-1 alpha-2 code of the Sri Lanka. The second part is either of the following:

- one digit (1–9): provinces
- two digits: districts

For the districts, the first digit is the second part of the ISO 3166-2 code of the province where the district is in.

== Current codes ==
Subdivision names are listed as in the ISO 3166-2 standard published by the ISO 3166 Maintenance Agency (ISO 3166/MA).

ISO 639-1 codes are used to represent subdivision names in the following administrative languages:

- (si): Sinhalese
- (ta): Tamil
- (en): English

Click on the button in the header to sort each column.

=== Provinces ===
Code	Subdivision name (si) (Provisional UN Draft 1972)	Subdivision name (si) (Note: For reference only, Sinhalese name in Sinhalese script not included in the ISO 3166-2 standard.)	Subdivision name (ta) (UN II/11 1972)	Subdivision name (ta) (Note: For reference only, Tamil name in Tamil script not included in the ISO 3166-2 standard.)	Subdivision name (en)
LK-1	Basnāhira paḷāta	බස්නාහිර	Mel mākāṇam	மேல்	Western Province
LK-3	Dakuṇu paḷāta	දකුණු	Tĕṉ mākāṇam	தென்	Southern Province
LK-2	Madhyama paḷāta	මධ්‍යම	Mattiya mākāṇam	மத்திய	Central Province
LK-5	Næ̆gĕnahira paḷāta	නැගෙනහිර	Kil̮akku mākāṇam	கிழக்கு	Eastern Province
LK-9	Sabaragamuva paḷāta	සබරගමුව	Chappirakamuva mākāṇam	சப்ரகமுவ	Sabaragamuwa Province
LK-4	Uturu paḷāta	උතුරු	Vaṭakku mākāṇam	வட	Northern Province
LK-7	Uturumæ̆da paḷāta	උතුරු මැද	Vaṭamattiya mākāṇam	வட மத்திய	North Central Province
LK-8	Ūva paḷāta	ඌව	Ūvā mākāṇam	ஊவா	Uva Province
LK-6	Vayamba paḷāta	වයඹ	Vaṭamel mākāṇam	வட மேல்	North Western Province

=== Districts ===
Code	Subdivision name (si) (Provisional UN Draft 1972)	Subdivision name (si)	Subdivision name (ta) (UN II/11 1972)	Subdivision name (ta)	Subdivision name (en)	Parent subdivision
LK-52	Ampāra	අම්පාර	Ampāṟai	அம்பாறை	Ampara	LK-5
LK-71	Anurādhapura	අනුරාධපුර	Anurātapuram	அனுராதபுரம்	Anuradhapura	LK-7
LK-81	Badulla	බදුල්ල	Patuḷai	பதுளை	Badulla	LK-8
LK-31	Gālla	ගාල්ල	Kāli	காலி	Galle	LK-3
LK-12	Gampaha	ගම්පහ	Kampahā	கம்பஹா	Gampaha	LK-1
LK-33	Hambantŏṭa	හම්බන්තොට	Ampāntōṭṭai	அம்பாந்தோட்டை	Hambantota	LK-3
LK-92	Kægalla	කෑගල්ල	Kekālai	கேகாலை	Kegalla	LK-9
LK-13	Kalutara	කළුතර	Kaḷuttuṟai	களுத்துறை	Kalutara	LK-1
LK-42	Kilinŏchchi	කිලිනොච්චි	Kiḷinochchi	கிளிநொச்சி	Kilinochchi	LK-4
LK-11	Kŏḷamba	කොළඹ	Kŏl̮umpu	கொழும்பு	Colombo	LK-1
LK-61	Kuruṇægala	කුරුණෑගල	Kurunākal	குருநாகல்	Kurunegala	LK-6
LK-51	Maḍakalapuva	මඩකලපුව	Maṭṭakkaḷappu	மட்டக்களப்பு	Batticaloa	LK-5
LK-21	Mahanuvara	මහනුවර	Kaṇṭi	கண்டி	Kandy	LK-2
LK-43	Mannārama	මන්නාරම	Maṉṉār	மன்னார்	Mannar	LK-4
LK-22	Mātale	මාතලේ	Māttaḷai	மாத்தளை	Matale	LK-2
LK-32	Mātara	මාතර	Māttaṛai	மாத்தறை	Matara	LK-3
LK-82	Mŏṇarāgala	මොණරාගල	Mŏṉarākalai	மொணராகலை	Monaragala	LK-8
LK-45	Mulativ	මුලතිවු	Mullaittīvu	முல்லைத்தீவு	Mullaittivu	LK-4
LK-23	Nuvara Ĕliya	නුවරඑළිය	Nuvarĕliyā	நுவரெலியா	Nuwara Eliya	LK-2
LK-72	Pŏḷŏnnaruva	පොළොන්නරුව	Pŏlaṉṉaṛuvai	பொலன்னறுவை	Polonnaruwa	LK-7
LK-62	Puttalama	පුත්තලම	Puttaḷam	புத்தளம்	Puttalam	LK-6
LK-91	Ratnapura	රත්නපුර	Irattiṉapuri	இரத்தினபுரம்	Ratnapura	LK-9
LK-53	Trikuṇāmalaya	ත්‍රිකුණාමළය	Tirukŏṇamalai	திருக்கோணமலை	Trincomalee	LK-5
LK-44	Vavuniyāva	වවුනියා	Vavuṉiyā	வவுனியா	Vavuniya	LK-4
LK-41	Yāpanaya	යාපනය	Yāl̮ppāṇam	யாழ்ப்பாணம்	Jaffna	LK-4

== Changes ==
The following changes to the entry have been announced in newsletters by the ISO 3166/MA since the first publication of ISO 3166-2 in 1998. ISO stopped issuing newsletters in 2013.

Newsletter	Date issued	Description of change in newsletter
Newsletter II-1	2010-02-03 (corrected 2010-02-19)	Addition of the country code prefix as the first code element, addition of names in administrative languages

The following changes to the entry are listed on ISO's online catalogue, the Online Browsing Platform:

Effective date of change	Short description of change (en)
2019-11-22	Correction of parent subdivision of LK-11, LK-12, LK-13, LK-21, LK-22, LK-23, LK-31, LK-32, LK-41, LK-43, LK-44, LK-45, LK-51, LK-52, LK-53, LK-61, LK-62, LK-71, LK-81, LK-82, LK-91, LK-92; Update List Source
2018-11-26	Correction of the romanization system label
2014-12-18	Alignment of the French short name lower case with UNTERM; update of the remarks in French
2012-08-02	Add administrative language
2010-02-19	Addition of the country code prefix as the first code element, addition of names in administrative languages

== See also ==
- Subdivisions of Sri Lanka
- FIPS region codes of Sri Lanka
