= Anuradhapura District =

Anuradhapura District අනුරාධපුර දිස්ත්‍රික්කය அனுராதபுரம் மாவட்டம்
- Administrative District
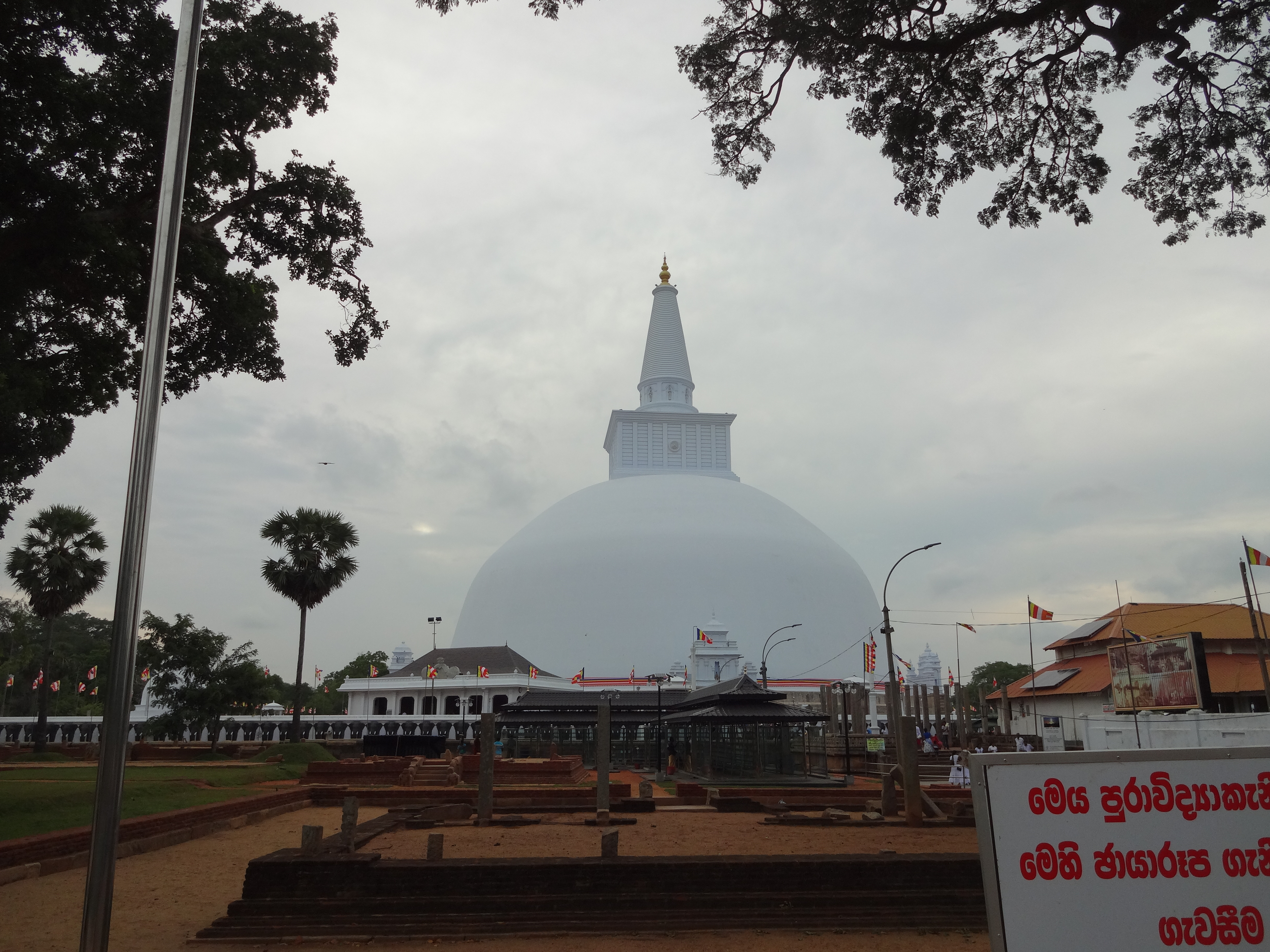
- Ruwanwelisaya Stupa, Anuradhapura

- Map of Sri Lanka with Anuradhapura District highlighted
- Coordinates: 8°20′N 80°30′E
- Country: Sri Lanka
- Province: North Central Province
- Largest City: Anuradhapura
- Divisions: List: Divisional secretariats: 22

Government
  - District Secretary: R. M. Wanninayake

Area
  - Total: 7,179 km^{2} (2,772 sq mi)
  - Land: 6,664 km^{2} (2,573 sq mi)
  - Water: 515 km^{2} (199 sq mi)

Population (2024 census)
  - Total: 960,080
  - Density: 144.1/km^{2} (373.1/sq mi)
- Time zone: UTC+05:30 (Sri Lanka)
- ISO 3166 code: LK-71
- Website: ds.gov.lk/dist_anuradhapura

Anuradhapura (Sinhala: අනුරාධපුර දිස්ත්‍රික්කය anūrādhapūra distrikkaya; Tamil: அனுராதபுரம் மாவட்டம் Aṉurātapuram māvaṭṭam) is a district in North Central Province, Sri Lanka. Its area is 7,179 km^{2}.

== Major cities ==
- Anuradhapura (Municipal Council)

== Other towns ==
- Bulnewa
- Eppawala
- Galenbindunuwewa
- Galnewa
- Ganewalpola
- Habarana
- Horowupotana
- Kahatagasdigiliya
- Kebitigollawa
- Kekirawa
- Konapathirawa
- Konwewa
- Madatugama
- Mahailuppallama
- Maradankadawala
- Medawachchiya
- Mihintale
- Nochchiyagama
- Nachchaduwa
- Padawiya
- Palugaswewa
- Rambewa
- Seeppukulama
- Talawa
- Tambuttegama
- Thirappane
- Yakalla

== Anuradhapura district election divisions ==
- Anuradhapura East Electoral District
- Anuradhapura West Electoral District
- Horowpothana Electoral District
- Kalawewa Electoral District
- Kekirawa Electoral District
- Medawachchiya Electoral District
- Mihintale Electoral District

== Demographics ==
Ethnicity in Anuradhapura District (2024)
1. Sinhala (90.6%)
2. Sri Lankan Moors (8.67%)
3. Others (0.71%)

Ethnic groups
Sinhalese	676,073	(90.66%)
Sri Lankan Tamil	5,073	(0.68%)
Sri Lankan Moor	61,989	(8.31%)
Indian Tamil	443	(0.06%)
Burgher	179	(0.02%)
Sri Lankan Malay	279	(0.04%)
Other	1,657	(0.22%)

Religion in Anuradhapura district (2024)
Religion	Percent
Buddhism	89.87%
Islam	8.60%
Catholicism	0.60%
Other or not stated	0.93%

Religions
Buddhism	670,963	(89.98%)
Hinduism	3,459	(0.46%)
Islam	62,797	(8.42%)
Roman Catholic	6,266	(0.84%)
Other Christian	2,073	(0.28%)
Other	135	(0.02%)

The population according to the 2001 census is 745,693, of whom 90.7% were Sinhalese, 8.3% Sri Lankan Moors, 0.7% native Sri Lankan Tamils and 0.1% Tamils of Indian origin. 90.0% of the population are Buddhists, 8.4% Muslim, 1.1% Christian and 0.5% Hindu.

== Divisional secretariats ==
Divisional secretariats constitute the next administrative division down from district.

- Anuradapura Divisional Secretariat
- Galenbindunuwewa Divisional Secretariat
- Galnewa Divisional Secretariat
- Horowpothana Divisional Secretariat
- Ipalogama Divisional Secretariat
- Kahatagasdigiliya Divisional Secretariat
- Kebithigollewa Divisional Secretariat
- Kekirawa Divisional Secretariat
- Mahavilachchiya Divisional Secretariat
- Medawachchiya Divisional Secretariat
- Mihinthale Divisional Secretariat
- Nachchadoowa Divisional Secretariat
- Nochchiyagama Divisional Secretariat
- Nuwaragam Palatha Central Divisional Secretariat
- Nuwaragam Palatha East Divisional Secretariat
- Padaviya Divisional Secretariat
- Palagala Divisional Secretariat
- Palugaswewa Divisional Secretariat
- Rajanganaya Divisional Secretariat
- Rambewa Divisional Secretariat
- Thalawa Divisional Secretariat
- Thambuttegama Divisional Secretariat
- Thirappane Divisional Secretariat

== Maps ==
- Detailed map of Anuradhapura District and Sri Lanka
