= North Central Province, Sri Lanka =

Province of Sri Lanka

North Central Province උතුරු මැද පළාත வட மத்திய மாகாணம்
- Province
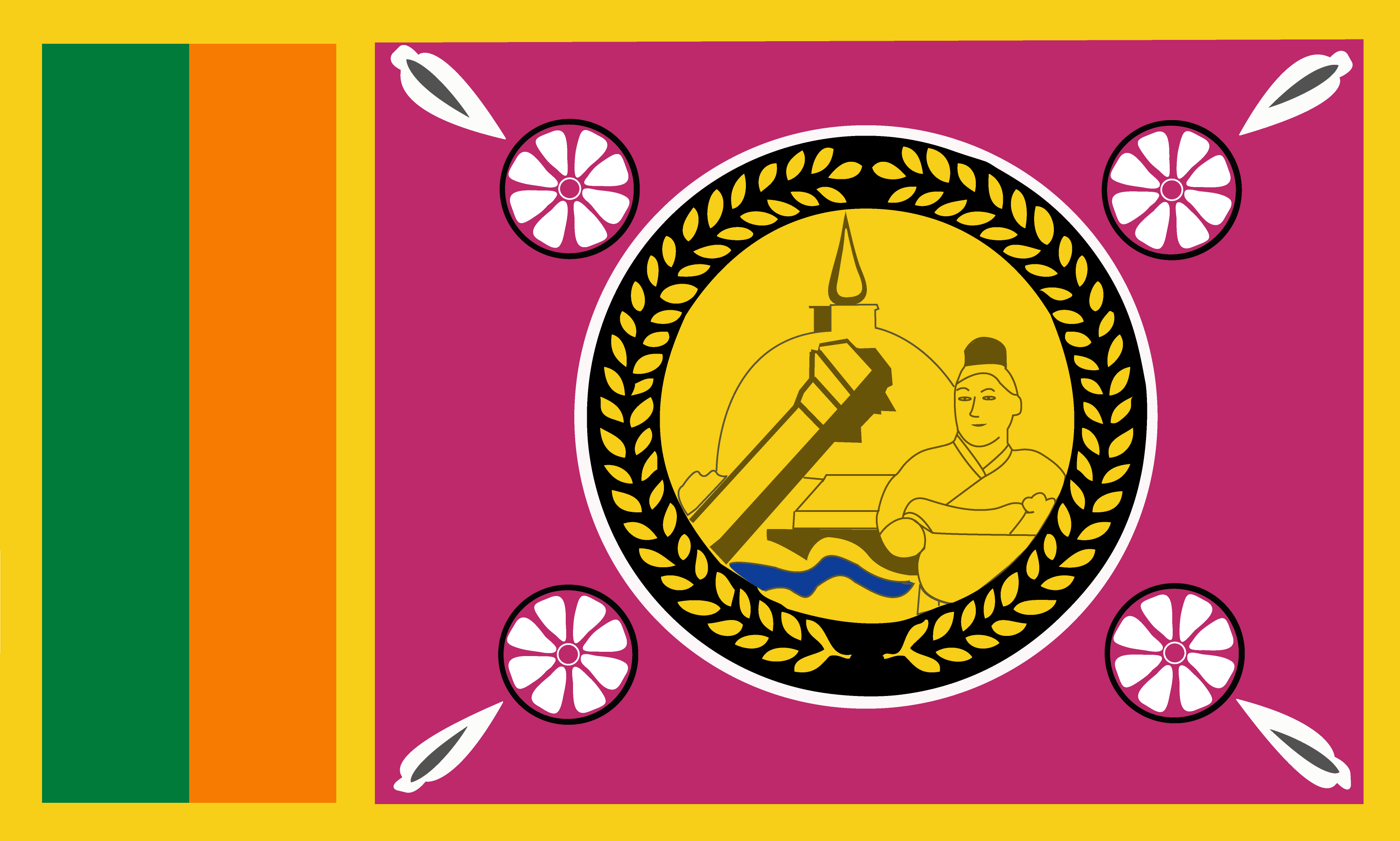
- Flag

- Location within Sri Lanka
- Country: Sri Lanka
- Created: 1873
- Admitted: 14 November 1987
- Capital: Anuradhapura
- Largest City: Anuradhapura
- Districts: List: Anuradhapura; Polonnaruwa

Government
  - Type: Provincial council
  - Body: North Central Provincial Council
  - Governor: Wasantha Kumara Wimalasiri

Area
  - Total: 10,472 km^{2} (4,043 sq mi)
  - Rank: 1st (16.31% of total area)

Population (2024 census)
  - Total: 1,407,610
  - Rank: 7th (5.91% of total pop.)
  - Density: 134.42/km^{2} (348.14/sq mi)

Gross Regional Product (2010)
  - Total: Rs. 232 billion
  - Rank: 7th (4.8% of total)
- Time zone: UTC+05:30 (Sri Lanka)
- ISO 3166 code: LK-7
- Vehicle registration: NC
- Official Languages: Sinhalese; Tamil
- Website: www.nc.gov.lk

North Central Province (Sinhala: උතුරු මැද පළාත Uturumæda Paḷāta, Tamil: வட மத்திய மாகாணம் Vada Mattiya Mākāṇam) is one of the nine provinces of Sri Lanka. The province has an area of 10,472 km^{2}, making it the largest province by area, and a population of 1,266,663, making it the 3rd least populated province. Anuradhapura is the capital city of the province.

== History ==
The North Central province is home to the ancient cities of Anuradhapura and Polonnaruwa, both of which were historical capitals of Sri Lanka during ancient times. The two cities were the capitals of the Anuradhapura kingdom (437 BCE–1017 CE) and the Polonnaruwa kingdom (1070–1232) respectively. As a result, there are many culturally and historically important ancient sites in this province.

The provinces of Sri Lanka were established by the British in 1833. In independent Sri Lanka, provinces did not have any legal status or power until 1987, when the 13th Amendment to the Constitution of Sri Lanka established provincial councils. The North Central Provincial Council is the main administrative and control body in the North Central Province.

== Geography ==
The province has an area of 10,472 km^{2} and a population of 1,266,663. It is the largest province by area, covering 16% of the total land area of Sri Lanka. The province consists two districts, Polonnaruwa and Anuradhapura; the Anuradhapura district is the largest district in Sri Lanka by area.

The province has a semi-arid climate and most forests situated in the province are Sri Lankan dry-zone dry evergreen forests.

The province is also referred to as Wew Bendi Rajje due to the many tanks (reservoirs) situated in the province, with more than 3000. Tanks were essential to manage water supplies in this dry province, and allowed Anuradhapura to develop into a large city as early as 437 BCE. More than 65% of the province’s population depend on basic agriculture and agricultural based industries.

== Demographics ==
In 2024, the North Central province has a population of 1,407,610.

=== Ethnicity ===
Ethnicity in North Central Province (2024)
1. Sinhala (90.4%)
2. Sri Lankan Moors (8.54%)
3. Others (1.03%)

Ethnic group	Population	%
Sinhalese	1,151,005	90.87%
Sri Lankan Moors	100,869	7.96%
Tamils^{1}	12,667	1.0%
Others	2,122	0.17%
Total	1,266,663	100.00%

^{1} Sri Lankan Tamils and Indian Tamils.

=== Religion ===
Religion in North Central Province (2024)
1. Buddhism (89.7%)
2. Islam (8.60%)
3. Hinduism (0.78%)
4. Catholicism (0.59%)
5. Others (0.36%)

Religion in North Central Province (2012 Census)
Religion	Census 2012	
Religion	Population	%
Buddhism	1,139,595	89.97%
Islam	101,958	8.05%
Christianity	14,875	1.17%
Hinduism	10,117	0.80%
Others/None	118	0.009%
Total	1,266,663	100%

=== Employment ===
Percentages of employed population (aged 15 years and above) by sector of employment and sex
Employed Population	Total	Percentage Male	Percentage Female
Government employee	100,045	76.1	23.9
Semi government employee	9,737	69.4	30.6
Private sector employee	84,916	72.7	27.3
Employer	7,176	83.9	16.1
Own account worker	231,848	80.4	19.6
Unpaid family worker	50,975	28.9	71.1
Total	484,697	72.6	27.4

== Administrative divisions ==
The North Central Province is divided into two districts and 29 divisional secretariats.

=== Districts ===
Administrative Districts of North Central Province
District	Capital	Area (km²)	Population
Anuradhapura District	Anuradhapura	7,128	856,232
Polonnaruwa District	Polonnaruwa	3,293	403,335

=== Divisional secretariats ===
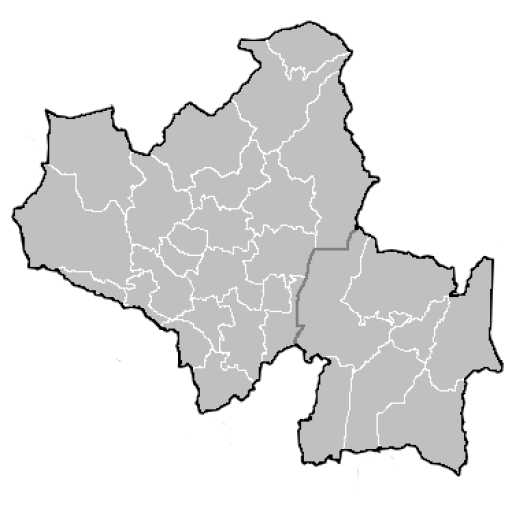
Divisional Secretariats of North Central Province, Sri Lanka

Administrative Divisions of North Central Province
Division	District	Population (2001 census)
Nuwaragam Palatha East	Anuradhapura	69,590
Nuwaragam Palatha Central	Anuradhapura	60,828
Kekirawa	Anuradhapura	58,879
Thalawa	Anuradhapura	57,663
Nochchiyagama	Anuradhapura	49,730
Medawachchiya	Anuradhapura	46,743
Galenbindunuwewa	Anuradhapura	46,527
Thambuttegama	Anuradhapura	42,143
Kahatagasdigiliya	Anuradhapura	40,137
Ipalogama	Anuradhapura	38,688
Horowpothana	Anuradhapura	36,714
Rambewa	Anuradhapura	36,426
Mihinthale	Anuradhapura	35,160
Galnewa	Anuradhapura	34,718
Palagala	Anuradhapura	33,740
Rajanganaya	Anuradhapura	33,434
Thirappane	Anuradhapura	26,962
Nachchadoowa	Anuradhapura	25,569
Padaviya	Anuradhapura	22,924
Kebithigollewa	Anuradhapura	22,227
Mahavilachchiya	Anuradhapura	22,183
Palugaswewa	Anuradhapura	15,557
Dimbulagala	Polonnaruwa	79,661
Thamankaduwa	Polonnaruwa	68,526
Medirigiriya	Polonnaruwa	65,575
Hingurakgoda	Polonnaruwa	64,289
Elahera	Polonnaruwa	43,915
Lankapura	Polonnaruwa	36,452
Welikanda	Polonnaruwa	33,770

=== Major population centres ===
- Aralaganwila
- Bakamuna
- Eppawala
- Giritale
- Habarana
- Hingurakgoda
- Horowpothana
- Kahatagasdigiliya
- Kebithigollewa
- Kekirawa
- Mahailuppallama
- Manampitiya
- Maradankadawala
- Medawachchiya
- Mihintale
- Minneriya
- Nochchiyagama
- Padaviya
- Polonnaruwa-Kaduruwela
- Rambewa
- Thalawa
- Thambuttegama
- Welikanda

== Education ==
Anuradhapura

- Anuradhapura Central College
- Anuradhapura Walisinghe Harischandra college
- Niwaththaka Chethiya National School. Anuradhapura
- Anuradhapura Technical College
- Buddhsravaka Bhiksu University
- K. B. Rathnayake MW
- Open University of Sri Lanka
- Rajarata University of Sri Lanka
- Sri Lanka Institute of Advanced Technological Education
- St. Joseph's College
- Teachers Training School
- University College of Anuradhapura (University of Vocational Technology)

Polonnaruwa

- Polonnaruwa Royal Central College
- Pulathisipura National College of Education
- Technical College-Polonnaruwa

== See also ==
- Provinces of Sri Lanka
- Districts of Sri Lanka
