= List of World Heritage Sites in Sri Lanka =

UNESCO heritage sites in Sri Lanka
- Locations of UNESCO heritage sites in Sri Lanka (green dots indicate natural sites and red dots indicate cultural sites)

Statistics
- World Heritage properties: 8
- UNESCO Biosphere Reserves: 4
- Memory of the World inscriptions: 5
- Intangible Cultural Heritage elements: 3
- First World Heritage inscription: 1982
- Most recent World Heritage inscription: 2010

The United Nations Educational, Scientific and Cultural Organization (UNESCO) designates World Heritage Sites of outstanding universal value that have been nominated by countries which are parties to the World Heritage Convention, established in 1972. Cultural heritage consists of monuments, such as architectural works, monumental sculptures and inscriptions; groups of buildings; and sites, including archaeological sites. Natural heritage is defined as natural features consisting of physical and biological formations; geological and physiographical formations, including habitats of threatened species of animals and plants; and natural sites of importance from the point of view of science, conservation or natural beauty. Sri Lanka ratified the convention on 6 June 1980.

UNESCO's international heritage programmes include four major categories through which different forms of heritage are recognised and safeguarded:

- World Heritage Sites
- UNESCO Biosphere Reserves
- Memory of the World
- Intangible Cultural Heritage

Sri Lanka currently has eight World Heritage Sites. The first three sites, the Ancient City of Polonnaruwa, the Ancient City of Sigiriya, and the Sacred City of Anuradhapura were inscribed in 1982. The most recently inscribed property, the Central Highlands of Sri Lanka, was added to the list in 2010. The Central Highlands of Sri Lanka and the Sinharaja Forest Reserve are natural sites, while the remaining six are cultural sites. In addition, Sri Lanka has six sites on its Tentative List.

Sri Lanka also has four Biosphere Reserves, five inscriptions in the Memory of the World Programme, and three elements inscribed on UNESCO's lists of Intangible Cultural Heritage. The country also served as a member of the World Heritage Committee from 1983 to 1989.

The Sri Lanka National Commission for UNESCO is the official government body responsible for coordinating and implementing UNESCO-related activities in Sri Lanka. The commission was established in 1949 and operates under the Sri Lanka National Commission for UNESCO Act, No. 38 of 2024.

== World Heritage Sites ==
UNESCO lists sites under ten criteria; each entry must meet at least one of the criteria. Criteria i through vi are cultural, and vii through x are natural.

World Heritage Sites
Site	Image	Location (province)	Year listed	UNESCO data	Description
Sacred City of Anuradhapura		North Central	1982	200; ii, iii, vi (cultural)	Anuradhapura was the first capital of Sri Lanka and a Buddhist spiritual centre. It was founded in the 4th century BCE. It was attacked by the Tamils in the 2nd century BCE and sacked by the Pandyas in the 9th century CE. The monuments were subsequently restored but the city was finally destroyed in 993 by the Chola emperor Rajaraja I and the capital was moved to Polonnaruwa. In the following centuries it was overgrown by jungle. Monuments that remain today include the Abhayagiri vihāra (pictured) and the Ruwanwelisaya stupa, as well as the Jaya Sri Maha Bodhi, a tree that grew from a cutting from the Bodhi Tree under which Buddha is said to have attained enlightenment.
Ancient City of Polonnaruwa	Ruins of a Buddhist temple	North Central	1982	201; i, iii, vi (cultural)	Following the destruction of Anuradhapura by the Chola dynasty, Polonnaruwa became the capital of the eponymous kingdom under Vijayabahu I. Several Hindu temples and bronze sculptures remain from the period. The city saw its golden age in the 12th century under Parakramabahu I, when numerous Buddhist monuments and temples were constructed, including the Vatadage (pictured), a temple that used to house the relic of the tooth of Buddha. It declined in the 13th century.
Ancient City of Sigiriya	A large granite rock with people walking toward it	Central	1982	202; ii, iii, iv (cultural)	Sigiriya was the short-lived capital of King Kashyapa, who ruled between 477 and 495, after he had his father King Dhatusena killed. The city is built on and around the "Lion's rock", a 180 m (590 ft) granite volcanic plug. After the defeat of Kashyapa by his brother Moggallana I, the site was returned to Buddhist monks who had lived in the grottoes in the area earlier. Today, the site is in ruins, with parts of fortifications and buildings preserved, as well as frescos representing feminine figures. The style of these frescos was influential in the following centuries.
Sacred City of Kandy	A Buddhist temple in white stone and a flag in front	Central	1988	450; iv, vi (cultural)	Kandy was founded in the 14th century and served as the capital of the eponymous kingdom from 1592 to 1815, when the British entered it. It remains the religious Buddhist capital of Sri Lanka and a pilgrimage centre. Following the former tradition of moving the relic when changing the capital, the relic of the tooth of Buddha is stored in the Temple of the Tooth (pictured), with the current structure dating to the mid-18th century. Other monuments include the Royal Palace and several Buddhist temples.
Sinharaja Forest Reserve	Look at a rain forest from above	Sabaragamuwa and Southern	1988	405; ix, x (natural)	Sinharaja Forest Reserve comprises some of Sri Lanka's last relatively undisturbed rain forests. The flora is a relic of the ancient Gondwanaland supercontinent, and it is important for the study of biological evolution and continental drift. Valleys and lower areas are covered by Dipterocarpus species while secondary forest and shrubs cover areas where the original forest has been removed. The area is home to numerous endemic species of birds, mammals, butterflies, and amphibians.
Old Town of Galle and its fortifications	Aerial photo of Galle fort	Southern	1988	451; iv (cultural)	The town of Galle was founded by the Portuguese who built the first fortifications there at the end of the 16th century. The Dutch East India Company took over the fort in 1640 and constructed a bastioned stone wall, giving the town its present layout. Galle saw its peak development in the 18th century, when it housed 500 families and had large administrative buildings and warehouses. It was handed over to the British in 1796. The town is the best preserved example of a European-built fortified city in South and Southeast Asia. The architecture represents a fusion of European and regional traditions between the 16th and 19th centuries. One of the important features is a sewer system that used seawater for flushing.
Rangiri Dambulla Cave Temple	Stupa with sitting Buddhas around it in a cave with painted walls	Central	1991	561; i, iv (cultural)	The cave monastery is the largest and best preserved Buddhist complex in Sri Lanka and an important pilgrimage site. It has been inhabited by monks since the 3rd century BCE. It comprises five shrines constructed in natural caves. The shrines went through a series of renovations, the present form dates to the 18th century. They contain outstanding examples of religious art, including statues and wall paintings in the style of the Kandy art school.
Central Highlands of Sri Lanka	A mountain from far	Central and Sabaragamuwa	2010	1203; ix, x (natural)	This site comprises three areas with the least disturbed remaining areas of the submontane and montane rain forests of Sri Lanka: the Peak Wilderness Protected Area (Adam's Peak pictured), the Horton Plains National Park, and the Knuckles Conservation Forest. The area is extremely rich in biodiversity and home to several endemic species, including the purple-faced langur, Sri Lankan leopard, and numerous molluscs, reptilians, and amphibians.

=== Tentative list ===
In addition to sites inscribed on the World Heritage List, member states can maintain a list of tentative sites that they may consider for nomination. Nominations for the World Heritage List are only accepted if the site was previously listed on the tentative list. Sri Lanka has six properties on its tentative list.

Tentative sites
Site	Image	Location (province)	Year listed	UNESCO criteria	Description
Seruwila Mangala Raja Maha Vihara		Eastern	2006	ii, v (cultural)	The Buddhist stupa was built in the 2nd century BCE under Kavan Tissa of the Kingdom of Ruhuna, to house the sacred relic of the frontal bone of Buddha. Over the centuries, it was abandoned until it was rediscovered in 1922 and renovated in the 1920s. The complex comprises restored entrances, a pond, and residential buildings.
Seruwila to Sri Pada (Sacred Foot Print Shrine), Ancient pilgrim route along the Mahaweli river in Sri Lanka	A conical mountain	several sites	2010	ii, iii, vi (cultural)	Sri Pada is a rock formation near the summit of Adam's Peak (mountain pictured), which is believed to be the Buddha footprint in Buddhist tradition or the footprint of Shiva, Adam, or Thomas the Apostle by Hindu, Islamic, and Christian traditions. The pilgrimage site was visited by kings and commoners for centuries. The route begins at the Seruwila Mangala Raja Maha Vihara and follows the course of the Mahaweli River. It passes sites with important Buddhist and Hindu shrines, including Polonnaruwa, Kandy, and Gampola.
Ancient Ariyakara Viharaya in the Rajagala Archaeological Reserve	Temple ruins with several pillars standing	Eastern	2020	i, iii, iv (cultural)	The Buddhist monastery was founded in the 2nd century BCE on the slopes of the Rajagala mountain. It was active until the end of the Anuradhapura era in the early 11th century, and afterwards abandoned. It could house about 500 monks. The remains at the archaeological site include stupas, temples, residential buildings, and cave dwellings. Paintings and inscriptions from the monastery's early period have been preserved.
Buddhist Meditation Monasteries of Ancient Sri Lanka (Padhanaghara Monasteries)	A resting place in the Ritigala monastery	North Central, North Western	2024	iii, iv, v (cultural)	Meditation monasteries of Sri Lanka that were built in 5th–10th centuries were used by Buddhist monks for meditative and ritual practices. They consisted of distant meditation houses and service buildings connected by a network of paths, all located in a forest setting. Four most outstanding meditation monasteries were chosen for this nomination: Ritigala (pictured), Manakanda, Arankale, and Maligatenna.
Sri Lanka's Tea Cultural Landscape	Tea plantation (Dambatenne estates) at about 1800 m above sea level in Haputale, Hill Country	Central, Uva	2025	iv, v, vi (cultural)	Tea plantations in Sri Lanka were established under British rule in the 19th century for the production of Ceylon tea. Their landscape, which includes the associated factories, shrines, churches, clubhouses, and railways, reflects the social, economic, and political interactions under the colonial land use system.
Ritigala Strict Nature Reserve	Stone stairs in a forest	North Central Province, Sri Lanka	2026	vii, ix, x (Natural)	The reserve is rich in biodiversity, partially due to the fact that it rises above the dry-zone plains and forming an ecosystem on its own (an inselberg). Numerous species are endemic and several are threatened. There are also remains of Buddhist monasteries from between the 8th and 10th centuries.

== Man and the Biosphere Reserves ==
UNESCO's Man and the Biosphere Programme (MAB) is an international programme aimed at improving the relationship between people and their natural environment through sustainable development. Under the programme, areas known as biosphere reserves are designated to promote the conservation of ecosystems, biodiversity and natural resources while supporting the sustainable development of local communities. Sri Lanka currently has four biosphere reserves.

UNESCO Biosphere Reserves in Sri Lanka
Biosphere reserve	Image	Location	Designated	Area	Description
Hurulu Biosphere Reserve	Hurulu Eco Park	North Central Province	1977	69,641 hectares	Located in Sri Lanka's dry zone, the reserve consists primarily of evergreen forest ecosystems and provides an important habitat for elephants and other wildlife.
Sinharaja Biosphere Reserve (UNESCO World Heritage Site)	Sinharaja rainforest	Sabaragamuwa Province, Southern Province	1978	29,830 hectares	The reserve contains the largest remaining contiguous area of tropical rainforest in Sri Lanka's lowland wet zone and is of particular conservation importance because of its high levels of plant and animal endemism.
Kanneliya–Dediyagala–Nakiyadeniya Biosphere Reserve	Raining in Kanneliya Forest	Southern Province	2004	25,393 hectares	Comprising the interconnected forest areas of Kanneliya, Dediyagala and Nakiyadeniya, the reserve is an important centre for biodiversity conservation and endemic species in Sri Lanka's southern wet zone.
Bundala Biosphere Reserve	Three Elephants	Southern Province	2005	18,242 hectares	Sri Lanka's only coastal biosphere reserve, it comprises a variety of ecosystems, including wetlands, lagoons, coastal areas and dry-zone forests, and provides an important habitat for both migratory and resident birds.

== Memory of the World ==
UNESCO's Memory of the World Programme is an international programme aimed at preserving significant documentary heritage, improving access to it and increasing public awareness of its importance. The programme was established in 1992, and documentary heritage of international significance is inscribed on the Memory of the World Register. As of 2025, five items of documentary heritage associated with Sri Lanka have been inscribed on UNESCO's Memory of the World International Register.

UNESCO Memory of the World inscriptions associated with Sri Lanka
Documentary heritage	Image	Year inscribed	Nominating country or countries	Description
Archives of the Dutch East India Company	Dutch Coat of Arms in Galle	2003	India, Indonesia, the Netherlands, South Africa and Sri Lanka	A collection of archives relating to the Dutch East India Company (VOC). It is an important body of documentary heritage for the study of colonial and commercial history in Asia and other regions.
The Indian Ocean Tsunami Archives	2004 Indian Ocean earthquake affected countries	2017	Indonesia and Sri Lanka	A collection of documentary materials relating to the 2004 Indian Ocean earthquake and tsunami, including records of the disaster, the responses to it and its impacts.
Mahavamsa	Palm-leaf manuscript from Sri Lanka	2023	Sri Lanka	An important historical chronicle covering the history of Sri Lanka from the 6th century BCE to 1815 CE. It is an important documentary source for the history of South Asia and Buddhism.
Documents connected with the Pānadurā Vādaya (the Great Debate of Panadura) in 1873	Migettuwatte Gunananda Thera, who participated in the Panadura debate Palm-leaf manuscripts associated with Migettuwatte Gunananda Thera	2025	Sri Lanka	A collection of four documents connected with the Pānadurā Vādaya, held in 1873. The documents relate to the religious debate between Buddhist and Christian leaders and include correspondence associated with the event.
Galle Trilingual Inscription	Galle Trilingual Inscription	2025	China and Sri Lanka	A historical inscription written in Chinese, Tamil and Persian. It provides important evidence of historical connections between Sri Lanka, China and other parts of Asia and records offerings made by those responsible for its erection to sacred religious sites.

== Intangible Cultural Heritage ==
The intangible cultural heritage of Sri Lanka consists of traditional knowledge, skills, performing arts, craftsmanship and cultural practices transmitted from generation to generation. Three elements associated with Sri Lanka have been inscribed on UNESCO's Representative List of the Intangible Cultural Heritage of Humanity. These are Rūkada Nātya, traditional string puppet drama, inscribed in 2018; the traditional craftsmanship of making Dumbara Ratā Kalāla, inscribed in 2021; and Kithul Madeema/Kithul Kapeema, an ancient indigenous technology for tapping kithul in Sri Lanka, inscribed in 2025.

Intangible Cultural Heritage of Sri Lanka
Element	Image	Year inscribed	Nominating country	Description
Rūkada Nātya	Ambalangoda traditional puppets	2018	Sri Lanka	A traditional form of string puppet drama in Sri Lanka. In addition to providing entertainment, the performances convey social and cultural messages and represent an artistic tradition that has been transmitted from generation to generation, particularly in the country's southern coastal regions. It was inscribed on UNESCO's Representative List of the Intangible Cultural Heritage of Humanity in 2018.
Dumbara Ratā Kalāla	Traditional Dumbara Ratā Kalāla	2021	Sri Lanka	A traditional form of handwoven matting produced in the Dumbara region. Made using natural plant fibres and traditional weaving techniques, the mats are characterised by intricate patterns and traditional designs. The traditional craftsmanship of making Dumbara Ratā Kalāla was inscribed on UNESCO's Representative List in 2021.
Kithul Madeema/Kithul Kapeema	Kithul treacle	2025	Sri Lanka	A body of traditional knowledge, skills and techniques transmitted from generation to generation for tapping the sweet sap of the kithul palm. The practice includes climbing the tree, preparing the flower stalks and collecting the sap. It was inscribed on UNESCO's Representative List of the Intangible Cultural Heritage of Humanity in 2025.

== See also ==
- Tourism in Sri Lanka
