= Ritigala =

Mountain in Sri Lanka

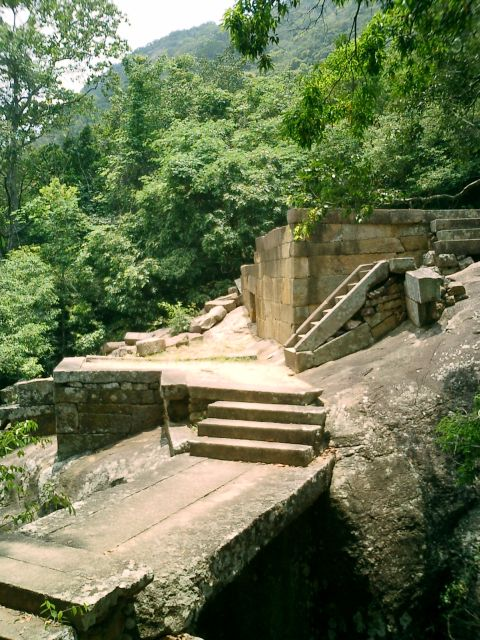
Ritigala ruins

Ritigala is a mountain in central Sri Lanka which is home to an ancient Buddhist monastery. The ruins and rock inscriptions of the monastery date back to 1st century BCE. It is located 43 km (27 mi) away from the ancient monastic city of Anuradhapura.

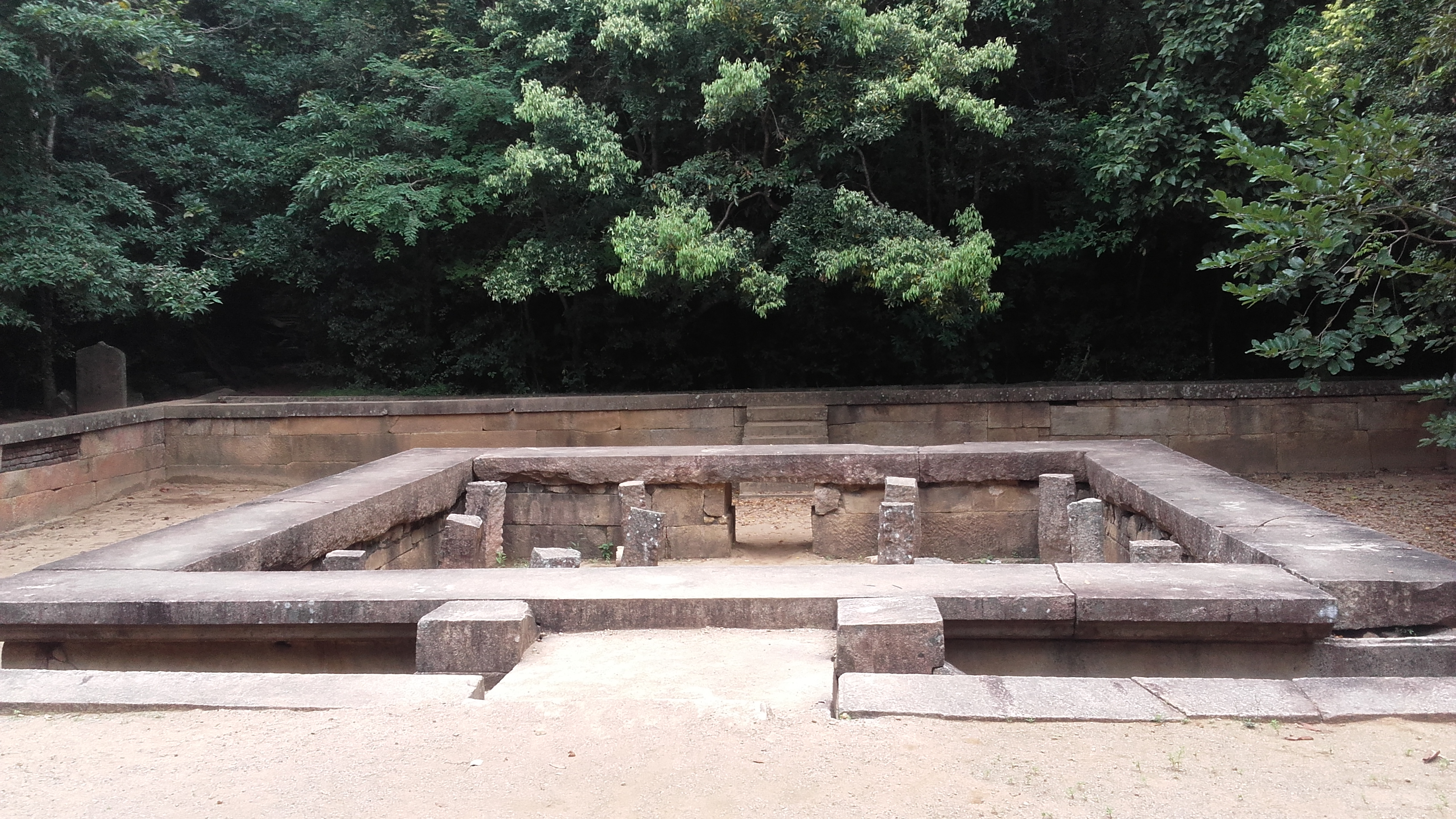
A resting place

== Ritigala mountain ==
Ritigala mountain consists of four peaks which rise steeply from the surrounding plain. The mountain is 6.5 km in length, and divided into northern and southern blocks by Maha-Degala Gorge. The highest peak is Ritigala Kanda in the southern block.

At 766 m (2,513 ft) above sea level, and 600 m (2,000 ft) above the surrounding plains, Ritigala is the highest mountain in northern part of Sri Lanka. The modern name Ritigala is derived from the ancient name Ariṭṭha Pabbata (Dreadful Mountain), mentioned in the Mahavamsa.

Its elevation is higher than the other main tourist attractions of the north central plains, namely Sigiriya, Dambulla, and Mihintale. The significance of this topographical feature lies in the abrupt sheerness of the massif, its wooded slopes, and the wet microclimate at the summit.

== Climate ==
The mountains intercept moisture-bearing winds and generate orographic precipitation, which makes the mountains wetter than the surrounding dry lowlands. During the northeast monsoon (December to February), Ritigala experiences the highest rainfall (125 cm) of entire dry zone.

The wet micro climate at Ritigala is a singular occurrence in the north central plains, the ancient Sri Lanka's “Wewu Bandi Rata” meaning “the land of rainwater reservoirs” in Sinhalese.

The climate at the summit is in sharp contrast to the climate at the foot; it is cooler in comparison to hot and dry climate of the region. The mist and cloud cover which cover the summit during the south-west monsoon results in high vapor condensation, in turn, turning the earth moist when the plains all around are in drought.

== Ritigala Strict Nature Reserve ==
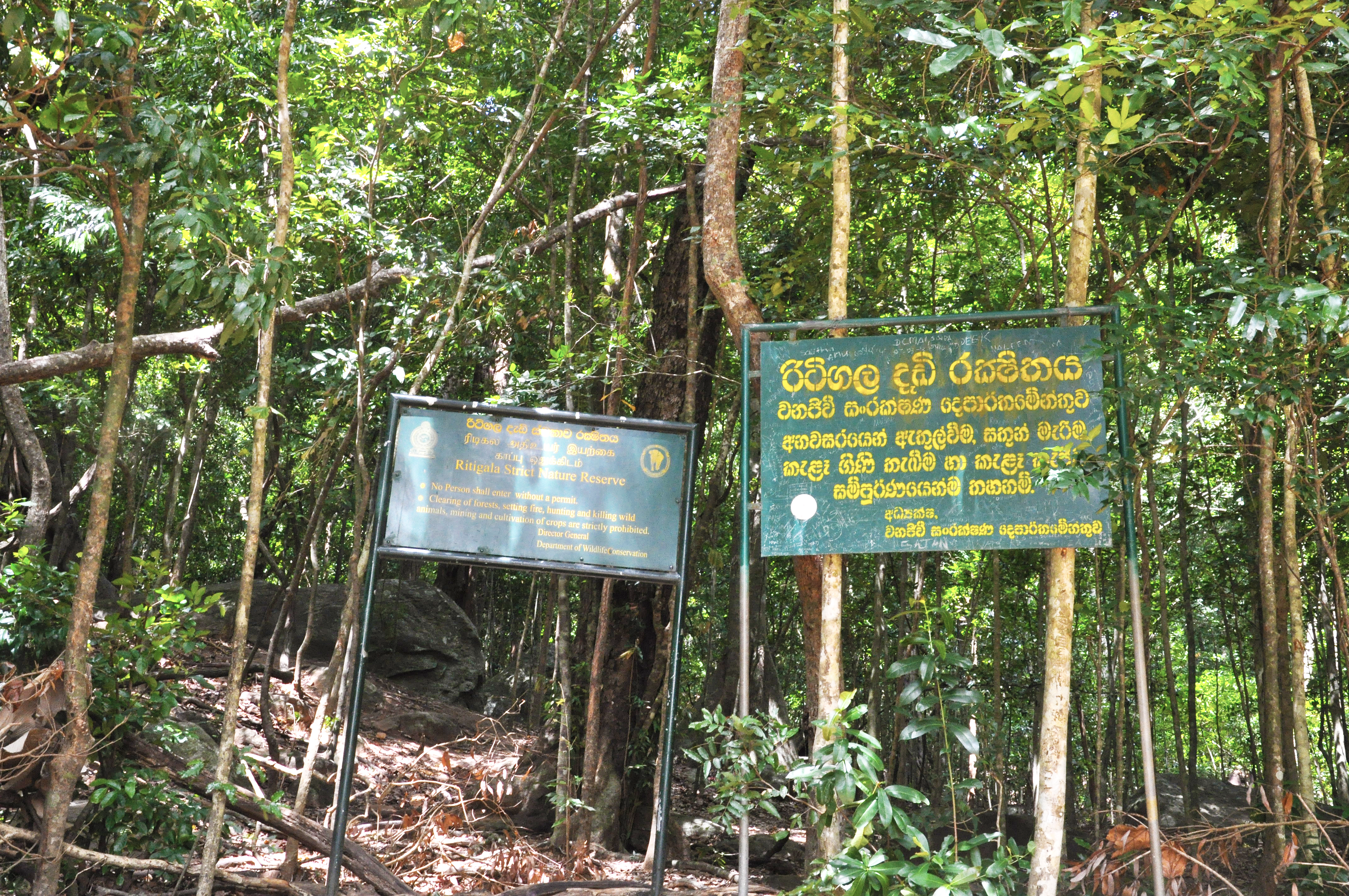
Reserved Forest- Ritagala

Ritigala is a strict nature reserve, covering 1,528 ha (3,780 acres). It was established on 7 November 1941 (Gazette Notification No. 8809), and is managed by the Department of Wildlife of Sri Lanka together with the Forest Department of Sri Lanka.

== Ecology ==
Ritigala reserve is in the Sri Lanka dry-zone dry evergreen forests ecoregion, and is home to five plant communities.

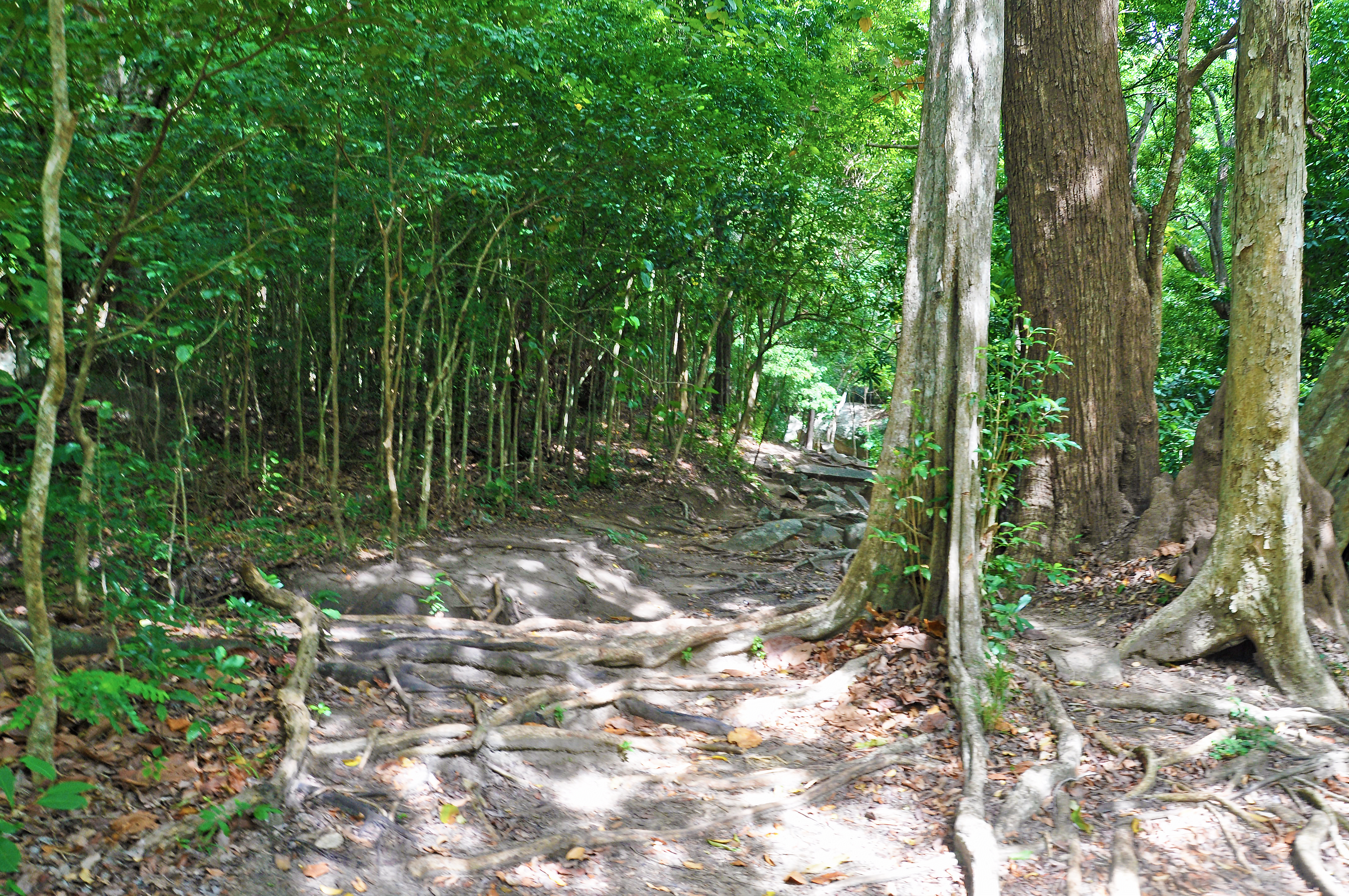
Vegetation Ritigala

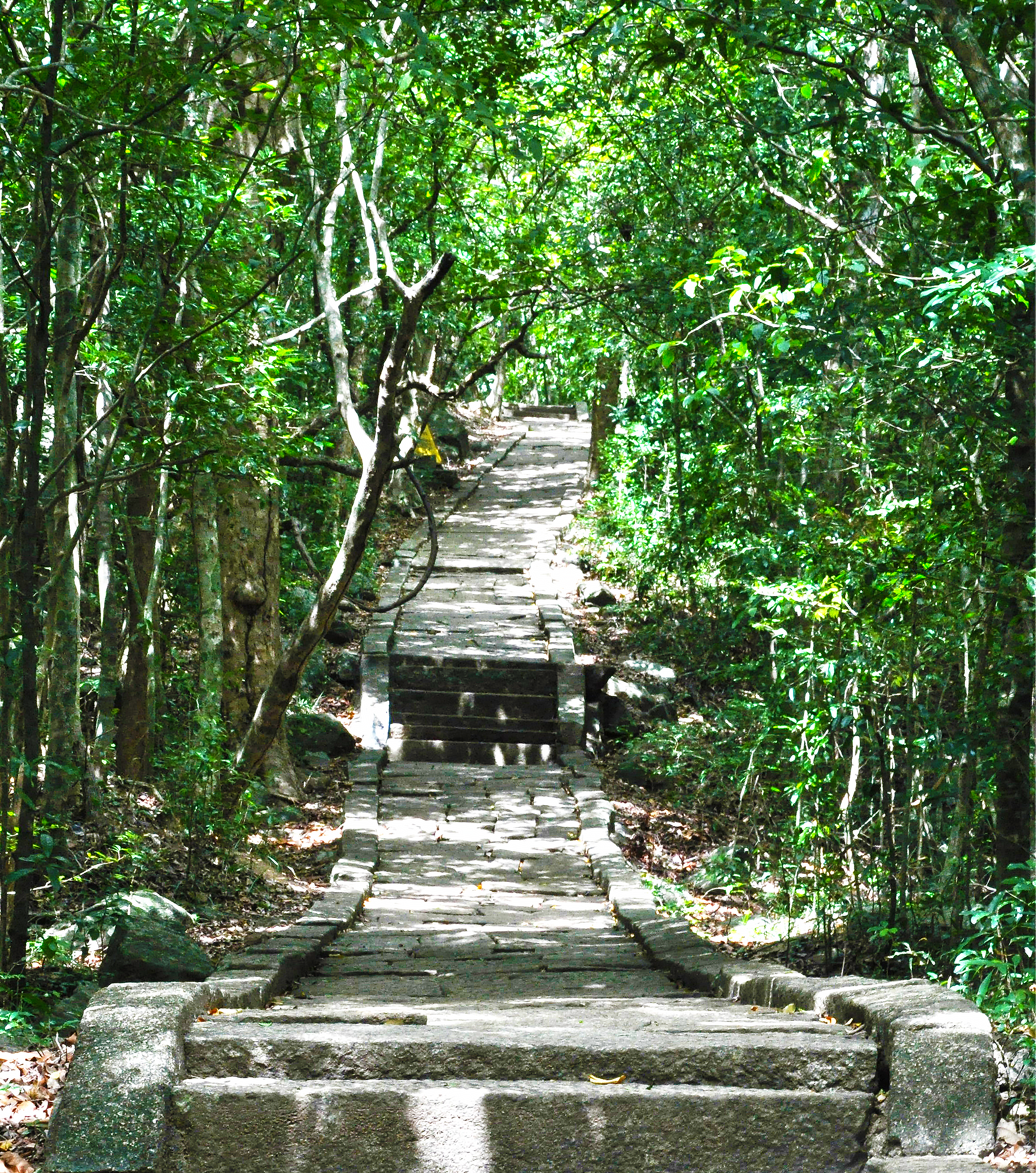
Forest along the way

- Dry mixed evergreen forest covers 844.7 ha, or 64.9% of the reserve's area. The trees are principally evergreen, forming a closed canopy up to 30 meters high. Dialium ovoideum, Dimocarpus longan, Diospyros affinis, Diospyros oocarpa, Drypetes sepiaria, Mangifera zeylanica, Mesua ferrea, Mischodon zeylanicus, Xylopia nigricans, and Madhuca clavata are typical canopy trees. Pterygota thwaitesii and Tetrameles nudiflora are emergent trees which extend above the canopy layer.
- Disturbed dry mixed evergreen forest covers 134.7 ha, or 10.4%. It occurs in areas that have been disturbed or degraded by human activity, and its characteristic canopy trees are Azadirachta indica, Drypetes sepiaria, Grewia helicterifolia, Macaranga peltata, and Pterospermum suberifolium.
- Short-stature forest covers 82.3 ha, or 6.3%. It is found along the ridge-tops in areas of high humidity and condensation and lower temperatures. The unique forest has a canopy of 2 to 3 meters, with trees and shrubs Acronychia pedunculata, Ardisia missionis, Cleistanthus patulus, Diospyros ovalifolia, Diplodiscus verrucosus, Eugenia rotundata, Lasianthus strigosus, Memecylon capitellatum, Mitrephora heyneana, Neolitsea cassia, Polyalthia korinti, Psychotria nigra, Pterospermum suberifolium, Suregada lanceolata, and Syzygium zeylanicum.
- Rock outcrop plant communities cover 163.6 ha, or 12.6%. Characteristic trees are Commiphora caudata, Ficus arnottiana, Ficus mollis, Givotia moluccana, Lannea coromandelica, Memecylon petiolatum, Euphorbia antiquorum, Bambusa bambos, Sapium insigne, and Wrightia angustifolia.
- Scrub covers 75.3 ha or 5.8%. It is found in areas of shifting cultivation; once fields are abandoned, the area is reclaimed by herbaceous species and shrubs.

== Legends ==
Legends abound on Ritigala. One of mysterious aspect is the belief of powerful medicinal herbs found near the crest. A herb called “Sansevi” is believed to have the power of conferring long life and curing all human pain. According to legend, all vegetation on Ritigala is protected by Yakkas, the guardian spirits of the mountain. The venerable Prof. Walpola Sri Rahula Maha Thera (1907–1997), a professor of History and Religions at Northwestern University, a Buddhist monk scholar, in his “History of Buddhism in Ceylon, says "the term “Yaksa” denotes superhuman beings worthy of respect. It is possible that it was applied, by an extension of meaning, also to some pre-Buddhistic tribe of human beings, aboriginal to Ceylon".

The legend has it that Prince Pandukhabaya (3rd century BC) was assisted by Yakkas during his battles against his eight uncles at the foot of Ritigala. Another legend refers to a duel of two giants, most possibly Yakkas, named Soma and Jayasena. Soma being killed in the duel, Jayasena became a legend.

== Ruins of the ancient monastery of Ritigala ==
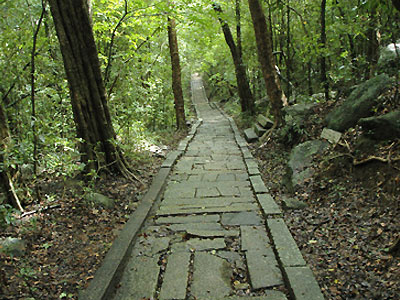
Stone paved pathway, Ritigala, Sri Lanka

The ruins of Ritigala monastery are located on the eastern side of the mountain at the foot of the gorge which separates the main peak from the northern ridge of the range. The ruins cover an area of 24 hectares (59 acres). The monastery precinct begins at the office of the on-site branch of Department of Archeology of Sri Lanka close to the foot of the reservoir named Banda Pokuna. The ancient man-made reservoir is a feat of engineering with a bund of polygonal plan completing a circumference of 366 meters. The construction of the reservoir is credited to King Pandukabhaya (437 -367 BC). The reservoir possibly served a ritual bathing purpose, with visitors bathing there before entering the monastery.

The order of ritual bathing tank, ruins of entrance complex and a pedestrian path seem to indicate devotees in large numbers visiting the monastery.

The edge of the reservoir is followed in a clockwise direction to arrive at the other bank, and cross the bed of the stream feeding the reservoir. The steep steps here onwards lead up to a beautifully constructed pavement, a stone path 1.5 meters wide that meander upwards through the forest, linking the major buildings of the monastery. The stone cut path is laid with interlocking four-sided slabs of hewn stone. Three large circular platforms at intervals along the pavement allow for rest.

=== Stone bridges, raised platforms and courtyards ===
There are stone double-platform structures, Padhanaghara, which are characteristic of Ritigala and other forest monasteries such as Arankele, Veherabandigala and the western monasteries at Anuradhapura. Spread over an area of about 49 ha (120 acres) are about fifty such double platforms.

Raised platforms formed by retaining walls of massive stones are found in pairs, linked together by a stone bridge. The main axis of the combined platforms is set exactly east west. The structures were then most possibly roofed and divided into rooms. These are believed to be used for solitary practices such as meditation, as well as congregational functions such as teaching and ceremony. Over a stone bridge lie interlocking ashlars and the ruins of a monastery hospital, where the medicinal herbs-leaves and roots-grinding stones and huge stone cut Ayurvedic oil baths can still be seen.

The pavement continues straight ahead to reach one of the roundabouts. About 20 metres (66 ft) before reaching the round about, a path heads off to the right, leading through enormous tree roots to a lookout, reached by a stone high above a burbling stream. Further up is another lookout. Then is found an artificial waterfall contrived by placing a stone slab between two rocks.

Another 500 metres (1,600 ft) and two further sunken courtyards are seen. The first courtyard contains a large double platform structure, one of the largest stone structures in the entire monastery; one of the platforms preserves the remains of the pillars which once supported a building. A few metres beyond lies the second courtyard and another large double platform.

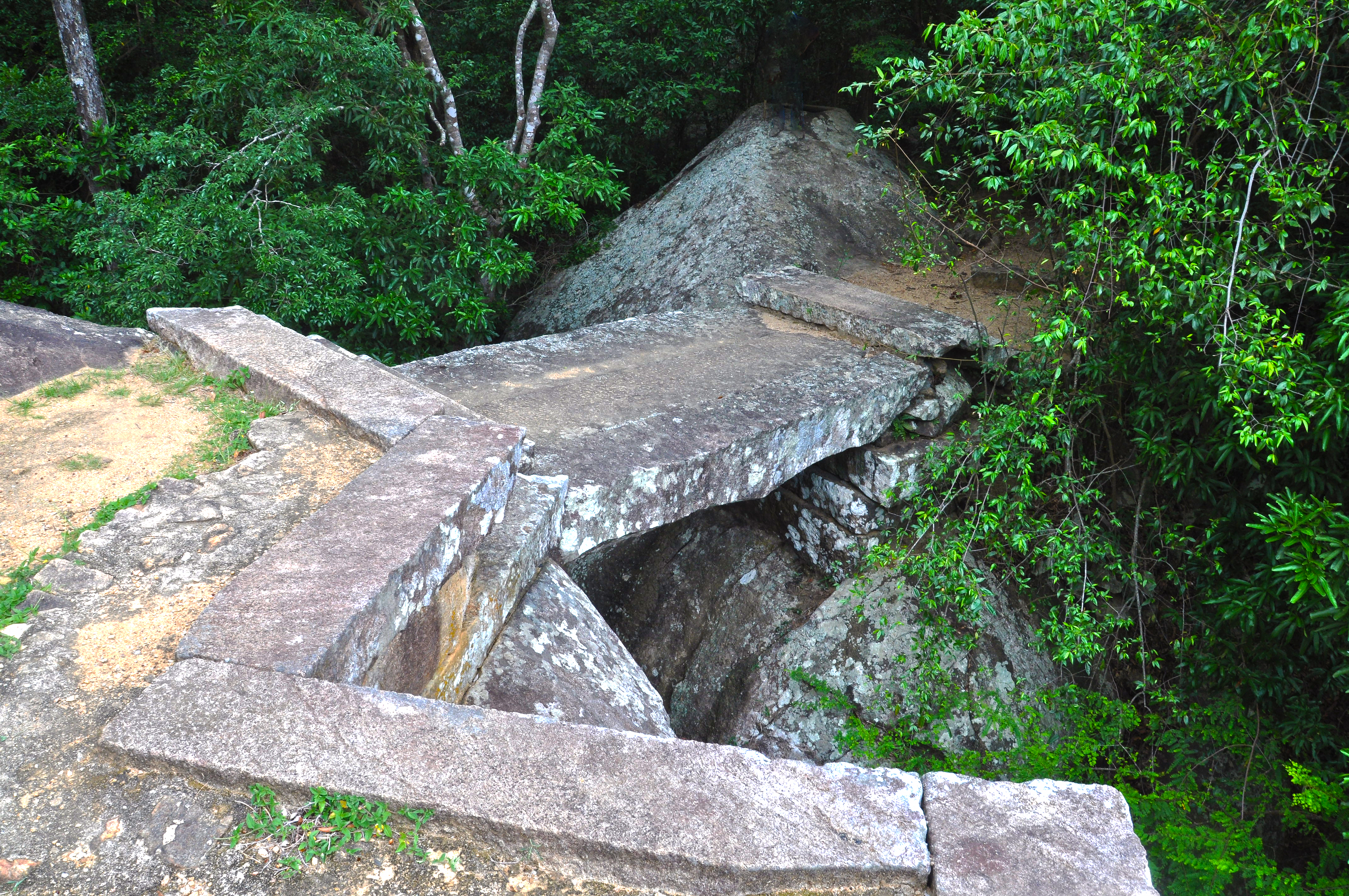
example of stone bridges

=== Extreme austerity at Ritigala Monastery ===
With the exception of a few broken granite Buddha statues in a number of caves, Ritigala has none of the traditional icons of Buddhist temples: no bo tree, no stupas. The first Lanka Vihare (temple) was founded near Ritigala at the foot of the mountain in the second century BC. The Aritta Vihare was founded a century afterwards. Royals proved generous patrons. In the ninth century AD, King Sena I made endowment of the monastery, a larger complex higher up the slope for a group of Buddhist ascetic monks called the Pansukulikas (rag robes) who devoted themselves to extreme austerity in search of supreme enlightenment.

Such was the detachment of these Buddhist ascetics from the traditional life of Buddhist monks at village temples, their robes were simply cleaned, washed and repaired rags, mostly shrouds picked up from cemeteries, in line with one of the thirteen ascetic practices (Dhutanga) outlined in Buddhism.

=== Decorated urinals: symbolic act of dissociation with ritualistic excesses ===
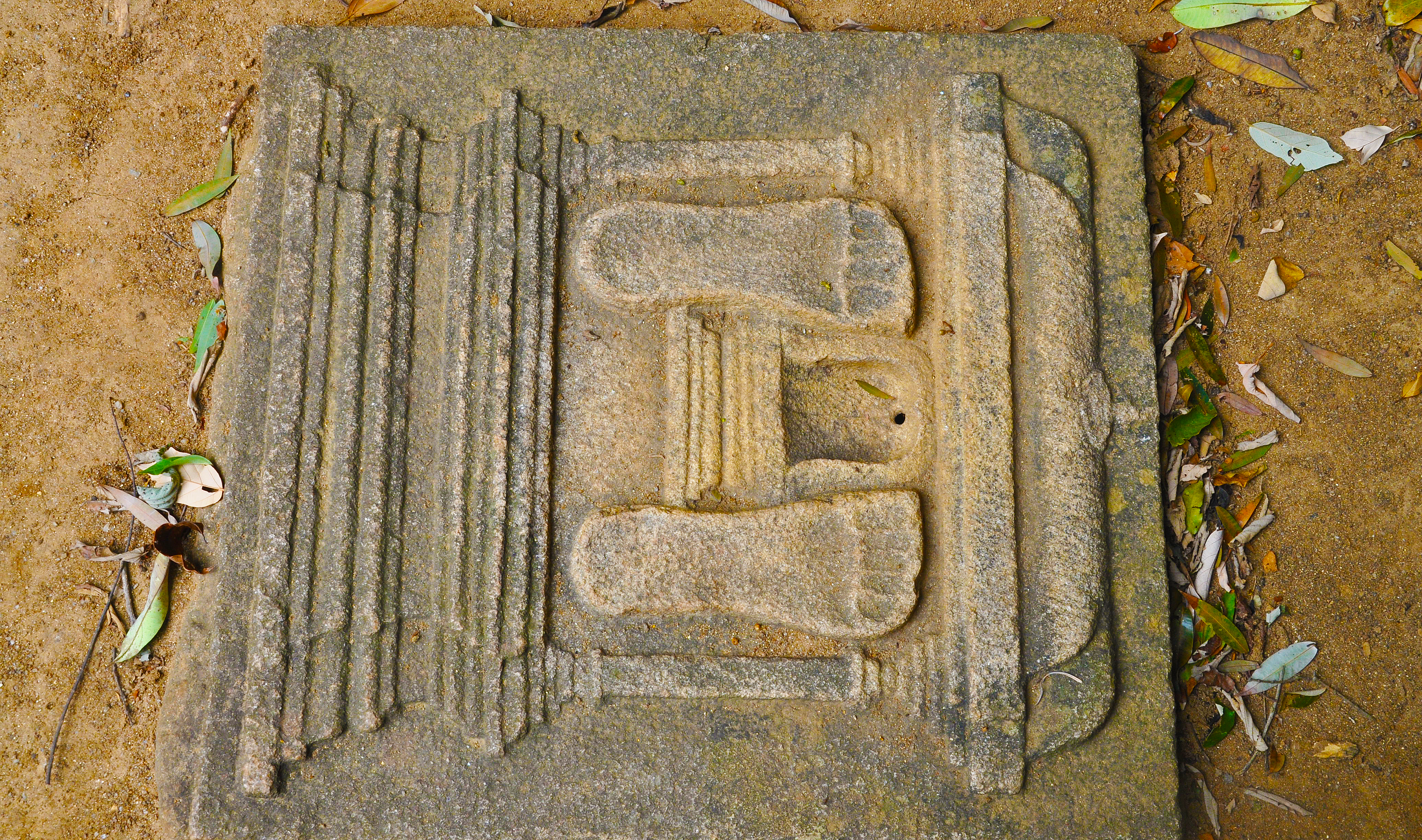
Decorated Urinals at Buddhist Monastery - Ritigala Sri Lanka

The only example of representational carving to be found at Ritigala is in the form of decorated urinals that consist of urine cup, drain hole and foot supports. It is believed that these decorated stones were meant to depict the architectural and ritualistic excesses of the orthodox monastic chapters to which the Pamsukuilikaa (monks devoted to extreme austerity) were opposed. It is also argued that the act of urination on decorated urinal stones was for them a symbolic act of dissociation.
