= Huberantha rumphii =

Conservation status
- Least Concern (IUCN 3.1)

Scientific classification
- Kingdom: Plantae
- Clade: Embryophytes
- Clade: Tracheophytes
- Clade: Angiosperms
- Clade: Magnoliids
- Order: Magnoliales
- Family: Annonaceae
- Genus: Huberantha
- Species: H. rumphii

Binomial name
- Huberantha rumphii (Blume ex Hensch.) Chaowasku

Synonyms
- Desmos borneensis (Miq.) Merr.; Guatteria canangioides Rchb.f. & Zoll.; Guatteria parveana Miq.; Guatteria rumphii Blume ex Hensch.; Hubera rumphii (Blume ex Hensch.) Chaowasku; Monoon canangioides (Rchb.f. & Zoll.) Miq.; Polyalthia beamaniorum I.M.Turner; Polyalthia canangioides (Rchb.f. & Zoll.) Boerl.; Polyalthia glandulosa Merr.; Polyalthia kunstleri King; Polyalthia rumphii (Blume ex Hensch.) Merr.; Polyalthia scortechinii King; Unona borneensis Miq.; Uvaria parveana Zoll. ex Miq.

Species of flowering plant

Huberantha rumphii is a species of flowering plant in the family Annonaceae. It is native to Peninsular Malaysia, Borneo, Sumatra, the Philippines, Maluku Islands, Solomon Islands, and Vanuatu. August Wilhelm Henschel the German physician and botanist who first formally described the species, using the basionym Guatteria rumphii, named it after the German botanist Georg Eberhard Rumphius who cataloged many plant species in Indonesia.

== Description ==
It is a tree reaching 15 meters (49 ft) in height. Its young branches are covered in fine rust colored hairs but become hairless when mature. Its hairless, slightly leathery, oblong to lance-shaped leaves are 10-22 by 3.5-7.5 centimeters with pointed tips and bases. The leaves have 9–12 pairs of secondary veins emanating from their midribs. Its flowers occur on solitary, 1-2 centimeter-long pedicels in axillary positions. The pedicels have several small, rounded, basal bracts and a larger, 5 millimeter-long bract midway along its length. The medial bract is covered in rust-colored hairs and has edges that curve backwards. Its triangular sepals are 0.6-1.5 centimeters long. The sepals have pointed tips and are covered in rust colored fine hairs. Its flowers have 6 petals arranged in two rows of three. Its variably shaped petals are 3-5.5 centimeters long with edges that are often wavy.

=== Reproductive biology ===
The pollen of H. rumphii is shed as permanent tetrads.
