= John of Głogów (14th century) =

14th-century physician, cleric, and writer

John of Głogów (German: Johann von Glogau, Latin: Johannes Glogaviensis) was a 14th-century physician, cleric and writer active in Silesia. He wrote treatises on healthy living and plague in the aftermath of the Black Death.

== Life ==
John was born around 1300. According to his own work, he was from orientalis Francia, which may mean eastern France (perhaps Champagne or Burgundy) or even "east Francia", that is, Germany. He wrote in Silesia. In manuscripts of his works, he is titled "reverend lord" and "magister", is said to have a doctorate in medicine and is described as the archdeacon of the church of Głogów.

John probably studied medicine in Italy, perhaps at the University of Bologna. He records having seen an experiment involving iron performed in Bologna. He also praises and cites the physician Gentile da Foligno, who taught in Bologna. Beyond this, his identity is disputed. The two main theories are those of August Wilhelm Henschel and Maria Kowalczyk.

According to Kowalczyk, John was a clergyman in the diocese of Wrocław (Breslau) by 1343. He is the same person as John of Środa Śląska (Neumarkt), called de Novo Foro in Latin documents, who served as physician to Bishop Przecław of Pogorzela. In 1343, he visited Avignon, then the seat of the Papacy. He became archdeacon of Głogów in 1353. The pope promised him a canonry in the cathedral of Wrocław. He was dead by April 1358. According to Henschel, John had succeeded Johannes de Crischow as the canon of Głogów by 1354, then succeeded Nikolaus von Beuthen as archdeacon by 1377 and from 1379 served as dean. He played a role in the disputed succession to the diocese of Wrocław in 1376–1382 as diocesan administrator. He was friends with Bartholomew I, abbot of Lubiąż Abbey from 1369 to 1374. He died sometime after 1379.

== Works ==
John is the author of three known works, all in Latin.

In 1355, John wrote a short tract on the proper regiment for a healthy diet, entitled Nova vinea seu sanitatis custodia. It is found in a single manuscript in the library of the University of Wrocław. He claims to be an old man at the time of writing. The tract contains several notes of historical interest regarding Silesia.

John wrote two plague treatises, one entitled De causis, signis, curis et preservationibus pestilencie and another entitled Causae et signa pestilentiae et summa remedia contra ipsam. De causis is known from three manuscripts in the Jagiellonian Library in Kraków. The earliest (BJ 1962) was copied by a scribe named Sulislav in 1360. It is associated with the first great outbreak of plague in Europe, the Black Death of 1348–1350. If John died in 1358, this work must have been edited by another, since the text refers to events as late as 1360. John does not claim in De causis to provide novel theories, but only exposition on established medicine. The treatise has four parts on the causes of plague, its symptoms, its treatment and its prevention. He blames the outbreak of the Black Death on the conjunction of Jupiter and Saturn in 1345. He notes that the epidemic was later and milder in Silesia than in Western Europe. He ends with a note on the persecution of Jews during the Black Death. He claims to have defended the Jews in public debates against claims of poisoning, but that he would omit it from his writings to avoid the "malice of the perverse".

Causae et signa is known from two manuscripts, the same Wrocław manuscript that contains Nova vinea and another in the Lobkowicz Library in Prague. It has been published by Karl Sudhoff. John's main sources are Ptolemy, Galen, Avicenna and Gentile da Foligno. The treatise is divided into five parts. The first concerns the causes of the spread of plague, which are corrupted air, vapours from infected areas carried by the wind and bad water. The second concerns the causes of the corruption of air (astrological) and variable susceptibility in humans (large pores, corrupted humours). Persons with large pores should not bathe too frequently. The third concerns the signs of coming plague (astronomical and meteorological phenomena). The fourth concerns the signs of ill health and the role of the physician in regulating diet and exercise. Joy is good medicine in moderation, but excess or sudden joy can kill. The fifth and final section is a discussion of foods and medicines people should take when the plague is active. He notes that beer is to be preferred for Silesians over wine. The best course of action, however, is to leave the infected area. Henschel and those following him associate Causae et signa with the plague outbreak of 1371–1373.

The explicits of both Nova vinea and Causae et signa state that they were written "for the common good." De causis is addressed to the "polity of Wrocław" (policia Vratislaviensis), that is, the prince-bishopric, and its "spiritual head" (caput spiritualis), the bishop.

== Bibliography ==
- Chiu, Remi (2012). Music for the Times of Pestilence, 1420–1600 (PhD dissertation). McGill University.
- Chiu, Remi (2012). "Music, Pestilence and Two Settings of O Beate Sebastiane". Early Music History. 31: 153–188. doi:10.1017/S0261127912000022.
- Henschel, A. W. E. T. (1850). Schlesiens wissenschaftliche Zustände im vierzehnten Jahrhundert: Ein Beitrag insbesondere zur Geschichte der Medicin. Josef Max und Komp.
- Kowalczyk, Maria (1974). "Drugi traktat o zarazie Jana, licencjata medycyny, archidiakona glogowskiego" [Le second traité de la pestilence par Jean, licencié en médecine, archidiacre de Glogów]. Biuletyn Biblioteki Jagiellonskiej. 24: 71–80.
- Mikotajczyk, Renata (1996–1997). "Examples of Medieval Plague Treatises from Central Europe". Annual of Medieval Studies at Central European University. 4: 229–235.
- Sarton, George (1948). Introduction to the History of Science, III: Science and Learning in the Fourteenth Century. Williams and Wilkins.
- Sudhoff, Karl (1915). "Pestschriften aus den ersten 150 Jahren nach der Epidemie des "schwarzen Todes" 1348. IX. Pesttraktate aus Böhmen, Schlesien und Nachbarbezirken bis zur Mitte des 15. Jahrhunderts". Archiv für Geschichte der Medizin. 9 (1): 53–78. JSTOR 20773114.
