= Arixyleborus rugosipes =

Scientific classification
- Kingdom: Animalia
- Phylum: Arthropoda
- Clade: Pancrustacea
- Class: Insecta
- Order: Coleoptera
- Suborder: Polyphaga
- Infraorder: Cucujiformia
- Superfamily: Curculionoidea
- Family: Curculionidae
- Genus: Arixyleborus
- Species: A. rugosipes

Binomial name
- Arixyleborus rugosipes Hopkins, 1915

Synonyms
- Webbia medius Eggers, 1927; Xyleboricus medius (Eggers), Schedl, 1936; Arixyleborus medius (Eggers 1927); Webbia camphorae Eggers, 1936; Xyleboricus camphorae (Eggers), Beeson, 1941

Species of beetle

Arixyleborus rugosipes is a species of weevil native to India, Sri Lanka, Philippines, Malaysia, Borneo, Vietnam, Indonesia, and in Australia, Japan, Korea, New Zealand as an exotic species.

== Description ==
Body is about 1.7 to 2.0 mm long. Body long and cylindrical. Head, pronotum and elytra are deep reddish brown. Legs and antennae are yellowish brown. Body globose, with moderately convex frons. Body surface is finely reticulate, with a few scattered punctures and fine hairs. Eyes are elongate, and deeply emarginate. Antenna with 5 segmental funicle, short scape and obliquely truncate club. Pronotum elongate with substraight basal margin. Scutellum subround and shiny. Elytra slightly longer and wide as pronotum. Basal margin of pronotum is substraight. There is a narrow, shiny and smooth transverse strip found on elytral base. Elytral interstriae ridged. Declivity gradually sloping posteriorly. Declivital face is moderately convex, whereas declivital striae and interstriae are distinctly marked as on the disc.

== Biology ==
A polyphagous species, it is found in many host plants.

=== Host plants ===
- Artocarpus chaplasa
- Canarium euphyllum
- Cinnamomum camphora
- Diospyros oocarpa
- Dipterocarpus turbinatus
- Hopea
- Shorea zeylanica
- Sterculia villosa
- Terminalia elliptica
- Terminalia manii
- Dipterocarpus grandiflorus
