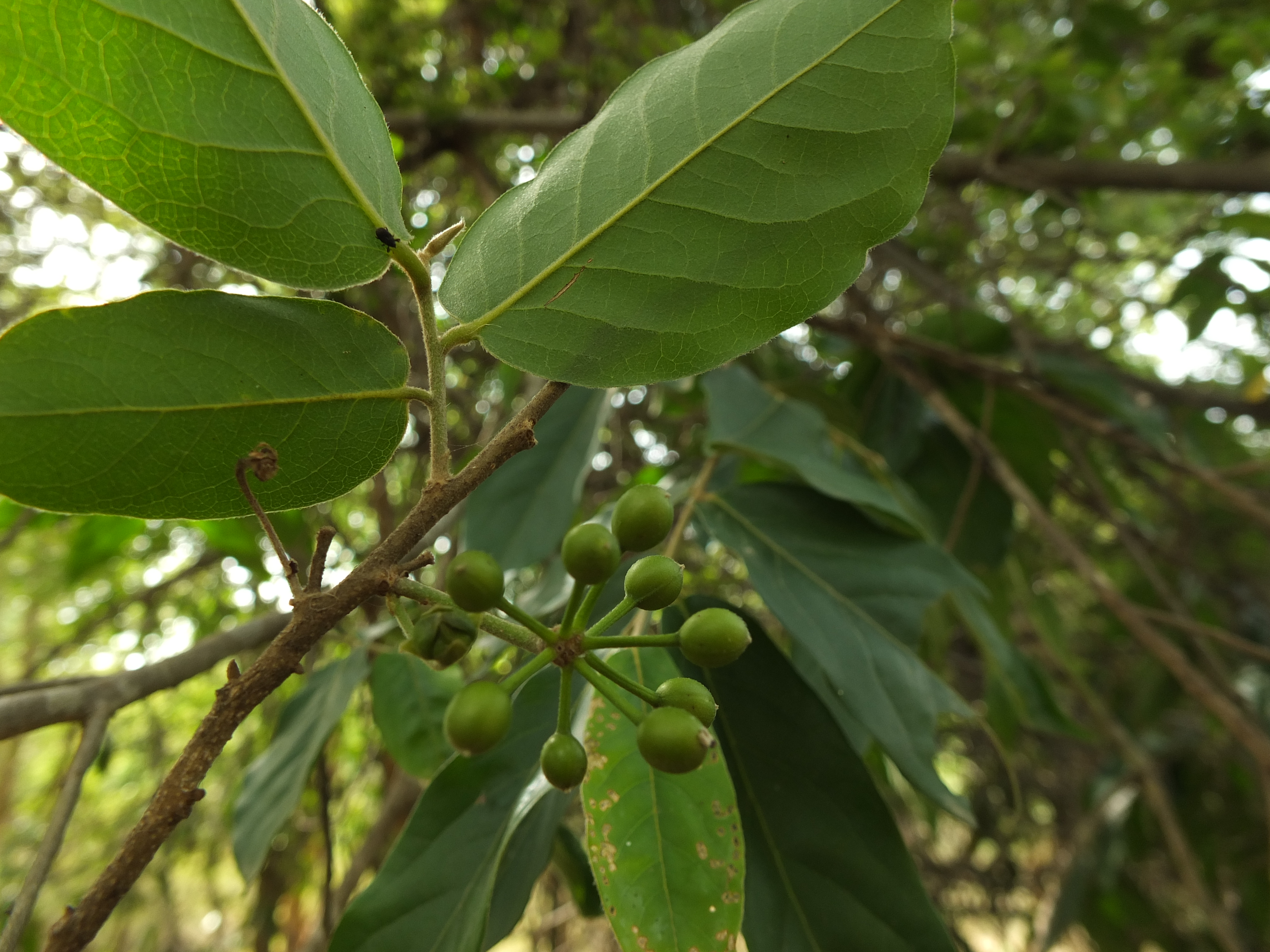
- Huberantha cerasoides (previously in genus Polyalthia)

Scientific classification
- Kingdom: Plantae
- Clade: Embryophytes
- Clade: Tracheophytes
- Clade: Spermatophytes
- Clade: Angiosperms
- Clade: Magnoliids
- Order: Magnoliales
- Family: Annonaceae
- Subfamily: Malmeoideae
- Tribe: Miliuseae
- Genus: Huberantha; Chaowasku

Synonyms
- Hubera Chaowasku

= Huberantha =

Genus of plants

Huberantha is a genus of plants in the family Annonaceae and tribe Miliuseae. It is distributed in Australia, tropical Asia, East Africa and some Pacific islands. Tanawat Chaowasku named the genus "Huber's flowers" in honor of the German botanist Herbert Huber and to highlight its flowers as a distinguishing feature of the genus. A number of species have been moved here from the genus Polyalthia.

== Description ==
The leaf veins of Huberantha form an interconnected net-like pattern. Their flowers are axillary. They have a single ovule and seed per ovary. A portion of their ovules remain fused to the seed coat forming a flat raphe. Their seed coats form spine-like intrusions into their endosperm. A layer of the outer pollen wall, called the infratectum, has a granular appearance.

== Species ==
Plants of the World Online lists:

- Huberantha amoena (A.C.Sm.) Chaowasku
- Huberantha asymmetrica I.M.Turner & Utteridge
- Huberantha capillata (A.C.Sm.) Chaowasku
- Huberantha ceramensis (Boerl.) Chaowasku
- Huberantha cerasoides (Roxb.) Chaowasku - type species
- Huberantha decora (Diels) Chaowasku
- Huberantha flava (Merr.) I.M.Turner
- Huberantha forbesii (F.Muell. ex Diels) Chaowasku
- Huberantha gracilis (Burck) Chaowasku
- Huberantha henrici (Diels) Chaowasku
- Huberantha hirta (Miq.) Chaowasku
- Huberantha humblotii (Drake ex Cavaco & Keraudren) Chaowasku
- Huberantha jenkinsii (Hook.f. & Thomson) Chaowasku
- Huberantha keraudreniae (Le Thomas & G.E.Schatz) Chaowasku
- Huberantha korinti (Dunal) Chaowasku
- Huberantha leptopoda (Diels) Chaowasku
- Huberantha loriformis (Gillespie) Chaowasku
- Huberantha luensis (Pierre) Chaowasku
- Huberantha mossambicensis (Vollesen) Chaowasku
- Huberantha multistamina (G.E.Schatz & Le Thomas) Chaowasku
- Huberantha nitidissima (Dunal) Chaowasku
- Huberantha palawanensis (Merr.) I.M.Turner
- Huberantha papuana (Scheff.) I.M.Turner
- Huberantha pendula (Capuron ex G.E.Schatz & Le Thomas) Chaowasku
- Huberantha perrieri (Cavaco & Keraudren) Chaowasku
- Huberantha rumphii (Blume ex Hensch.) Chaowasku
- Huberantha sambiranensis (Capuron ex Le Thomas & G.E.Schatz) Chaowasku
- Huberantha senjiana (R.Mural., Naras. & N.Balach.) R.Mural., Naras. & N.Balach.
- Huberantha stuhlmannii (Engl.) Chaowasku
- Huberantha tanganyikensis (Vollesen) Chaowasku
- Huberantha trichoneura (Diels) Chaowasku
- Huberantha verdcourtii (Vollesen) Chaowasku
- Huberantha vitiensis (Seem.) Chaowasku
- Huberantha whistleri I.M.Turner & Utteridge
