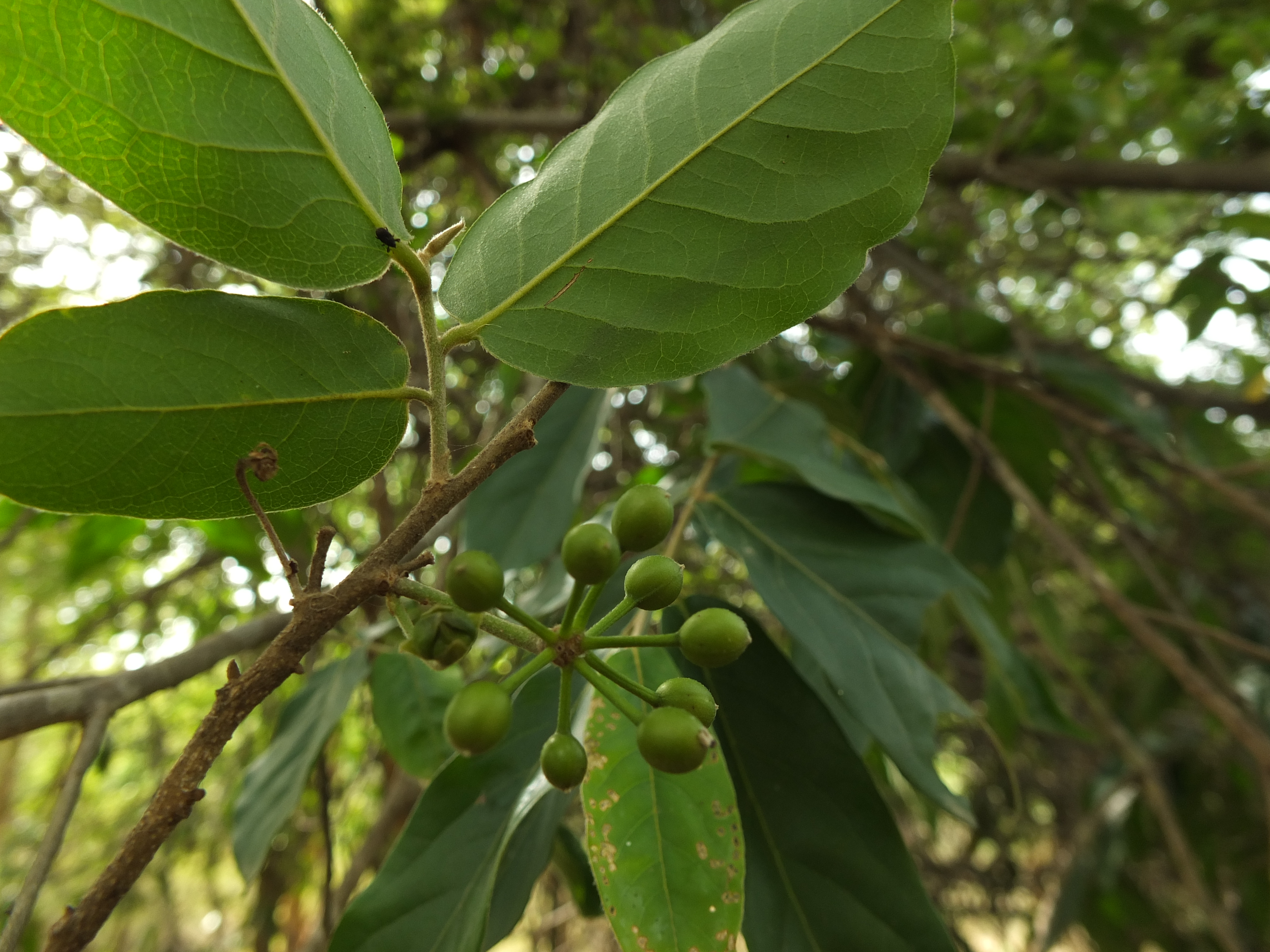

Conservation status
- Least Concern (IUCN 3.1)

Scientific classification
- Kingdom: Plantae
- Clade: Embryophytes
- Clade: Tracheophytes
- Clade: Spermatophytes
- Clade: Angiosperms
- Clade: Magnoliids
- Order: Magnoliales
- Family: Annonaceae
- Genus: Huberantha
- Species: H. cerasoides

Binomial name
- Huberantha cerasoides (Roxb.) Chaowasku

Synonyms
- Guatteria bifaria A.DC.; Guatteria cerasoides (Roxb.) Dunal; Hubera cerasoides (Roxb.) Chaowasku; Polyalthia bifaria (A.DC.) Hook.f. & Thomson; Polyalthia cerasoides (Roxb.) Bedd.; Polyalthia crassipetala Merr.; Unona cerasoides (Roxb.) Baill.; Uvaria cerasoides Roxb.

= Huberantha cerasoides =

Species of flowering plant

Huberantha cerasoides (synonym Polyalthia cerasoides) is a species of trees in the family Annonaceae and tribe Miliuseae. It is the type species of the relatively new genus Huberantha.

It is native to southern China including Hainan, Indo-China, India, Bangladesh, and Sri Lanka.

== Description ==
This is a small tree species with yellow flowers and single-seeded fruit, in clusters (see illustrations).

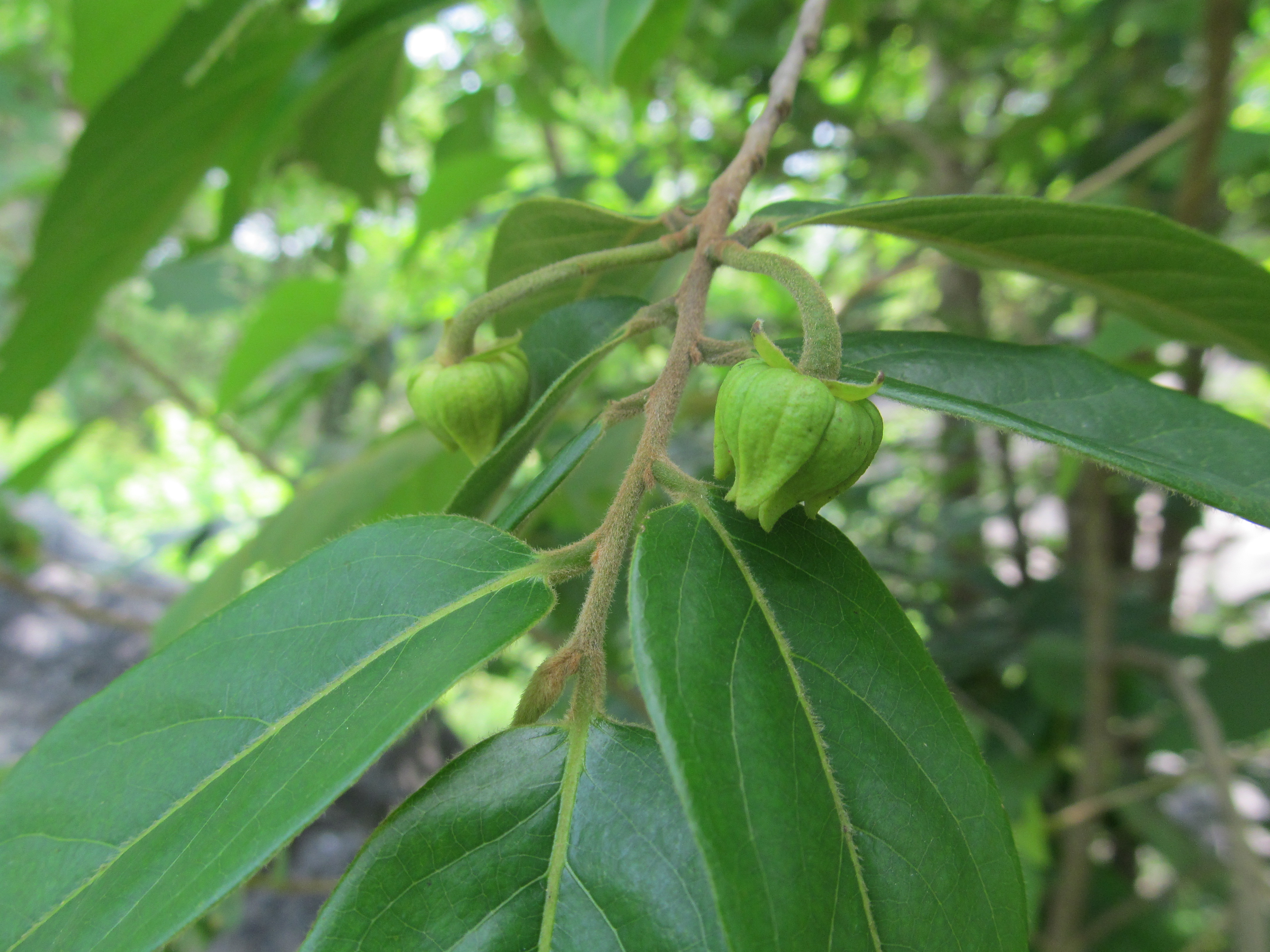

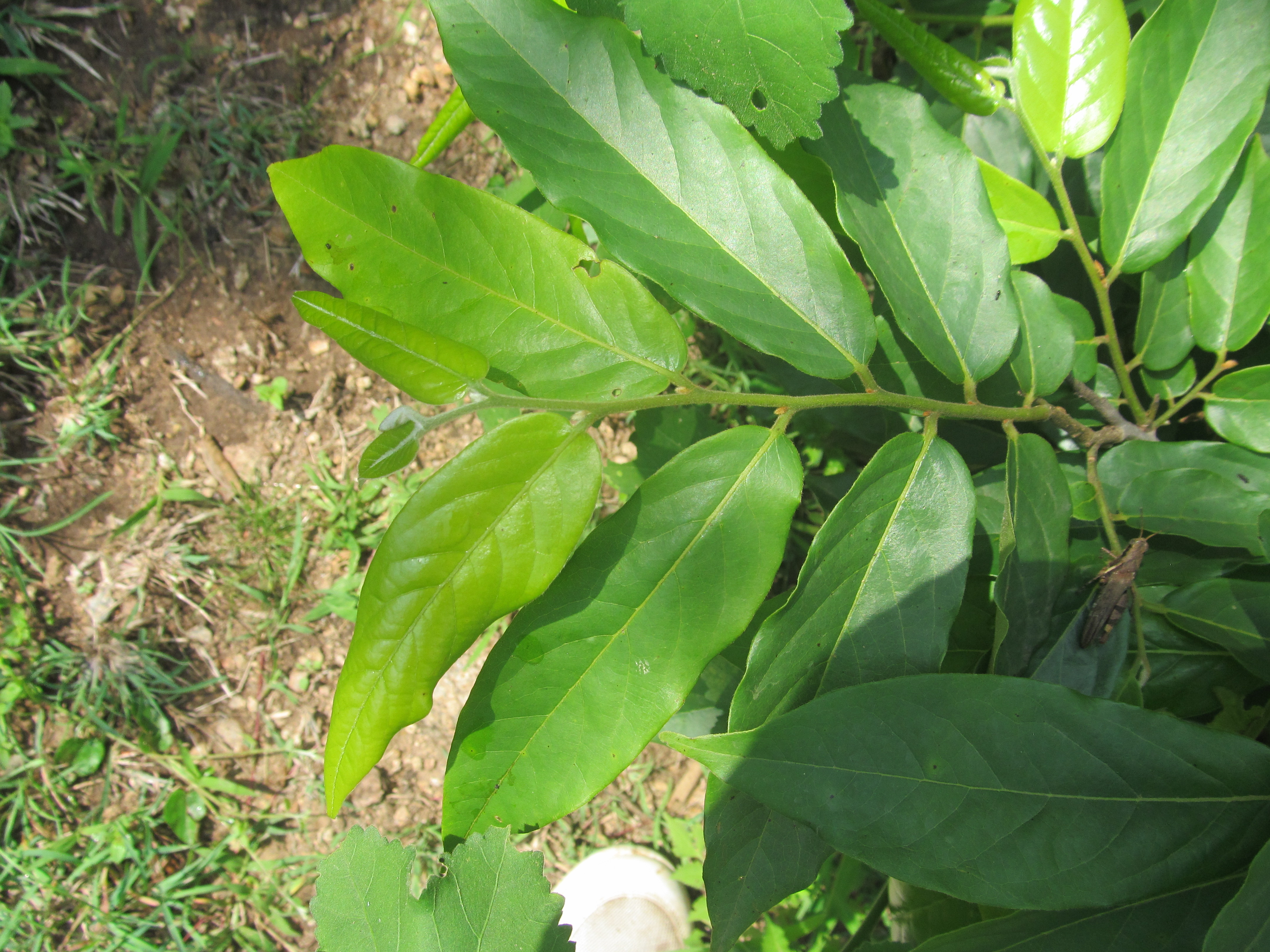

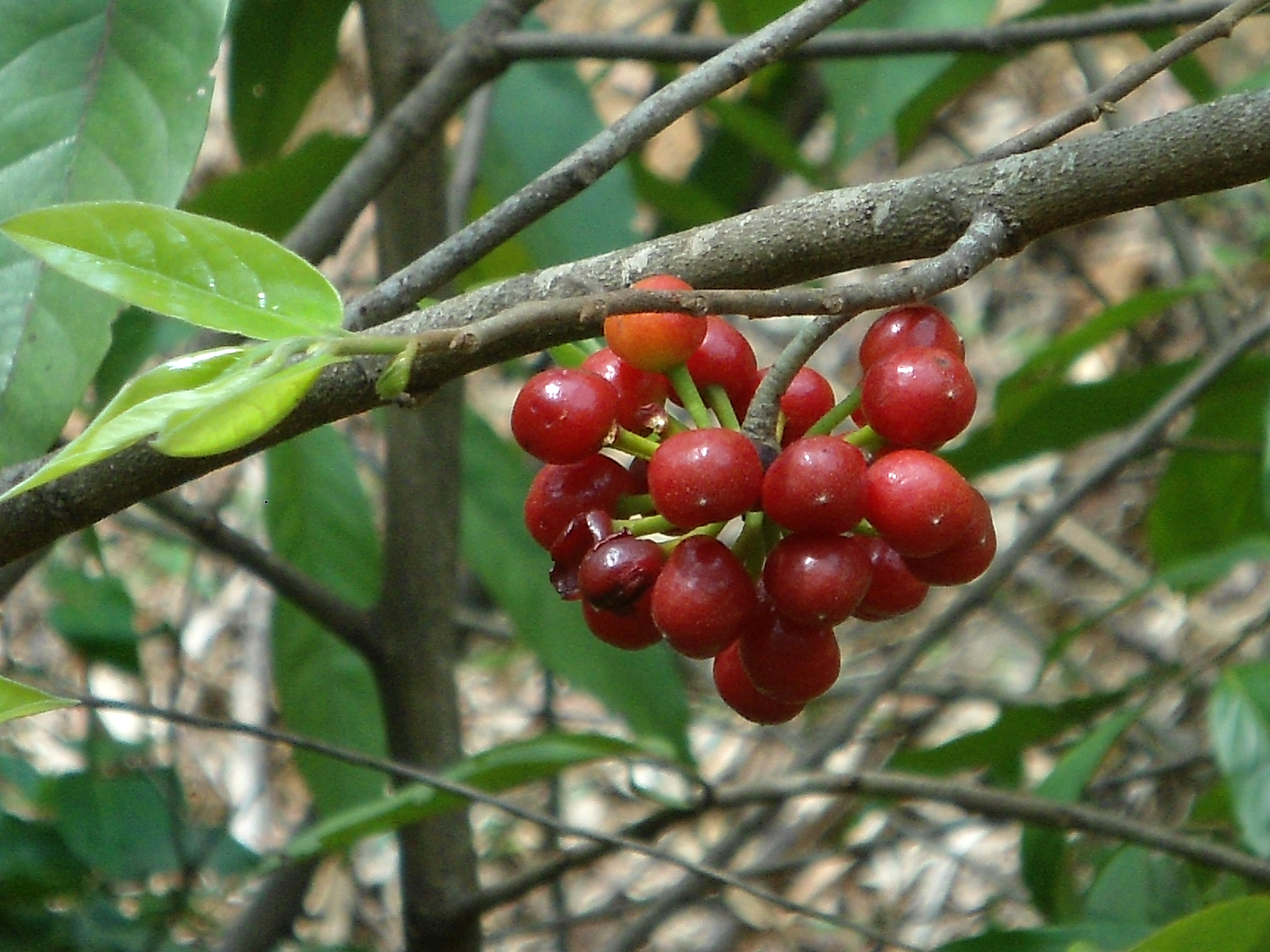

== Vernacular names ==
This species is known as "පට්ට උල් කෙන්ද - patta ul kenda" in Sinhala Language and quần đầu trái tròn in Vietnamese.
