= Huberantha whistleri =

Conservation status
- Critically Endangered (IUCN 3.1)

Scientific classification
- Kingdom: Plantae
- Clade: Tracheophytes
- Clade: Angiosperms
- Clade: Magnoliids
- Order: Magnoliales
- Family: Annonaceae
- Genus: Huberantha
- Species: H. whistleri

Binomial name
- Huberantha whistleri I.M.Turner & Utteridge

Species of flowering plant

Huberantha whistleri is a species of flowering plant belonging to the custard apple family (Annonaceae). It is endemic to Samoa. This taxa was named after the discoverer Arthur Whistler, a botanist who focused his studies on the Pacific studies, especially Samoa.

== Description ==
A tree up to 8 m (26 ft) tall, this species has smooth twigs and thin, papery leaves with 9–12 pairs of lateral veins. Its inflorescences grow from the axils of fallen leaves, bearing 1–2 flowers with hairy, triangular sepals and narrow petals up to 20 mm (0.8 in) long that enclose numerous stamens and carpels. The fruit consists of 16 or more small, egg-shaped monocarps covered in scattered hairs and borne on individual stalks.
