= Huberantha palawanensis =

Conservation status
- Critically Endangered (IUCN 3.1)

Scientific classification
- Kingdom: Plantae
- Clade: Embryophytes
- Clade: Tracheophytes
- Clade: Spermatophytes
- Clade: Angiosperms
- Clade: Magnoliids
- Order: Magnoliales
- Family: Annonaceae
- Genus: Huberantha
- Species: H. palawanensis

Binomial name
- Huberantha palawanensis (Merr.) I.M.Turner

Synonyms
- Polyalthia palawanensis Merr.

Species of flowering plant

Huberantha palawanensis (synonym Polyalthia palawanensis) is a species of plant in the Annonaceae family. It is endemic to the Philippines.
