= Huberantha flava =

Conservation status
- Vulnerable (IUCN 3.1)

Scientific classification
- Kingdom: Plantae
- Clade: Embryophytes
- Clade: Tracheophytes
- Clade: Angiosperms
- Clade: Magnoliids
- Order: Magnoliales
- Family: Annonaceae
- Genus: Huberantha
- Species: H. flava

Binomial name
- Huberantha flava (Merr.) I.M.Turner

Synonyms
- Polyalthia flava Merr.

Species of flowering plant

Huberantha flava is a species of flowering plant in the family Annonaceae. It is native to the Philippines. Elmer Drew Merrill the American botanist who first formally described the species, using the basionym Polyalthia flava, named it after its brilliant yellow flowers (flavus in Latin).

== Description ==
It is a tree reaching 12 meters (39 ft) in height. Its young branches are covered in dense rust-colored hairs. Its mature branches are gray with a striated appearance. Its petioles are 5 millimeters long and covered in fine, rust colored hairs. Its leathery, oblong leaves are 7–12 by 3-4.5 centimeters with tapering tips and wedge-shaped bases. The upper surfaces of the leaves are hairless and shiny, while the undersides have sparse hairs. The leaf veins form an interconnected net-like pattern. Its bright yellow, odorless, solitary flowers are 5 centimeters in diameter and occur in axillary positions on peduncles that are 2 centimeters long. The peduncles are covered in fine rust colored hairs and have 2–3 basal bracts. Its calyx have oval lobes that are 4 millimeters long with pointed tips. The lobes of the calyx are covered in fine rust colored hairs. Its flowers have 6 petals arranged in two rows of three. The elliptical to oval, fleshy petals are 2.5 by 1.5–1.8 centimeters with shallowly pointed tips. The petals are hairless except for their base which has fine hairs. Its flowers have numerous stamen that are 1.8 millimeters long. Its flowers have numerous carpels with 1.3 millimeter-long ovaries that are covered in fine hairs. The ovaries have a single ovule at their base.

=== Reproductive biology ===
The pollen of H. flava is shed as permanent tetrads.

== Habitat and distribution ==
It has been observed growing in hill forests at elevations of 200 meters (660 ft).
