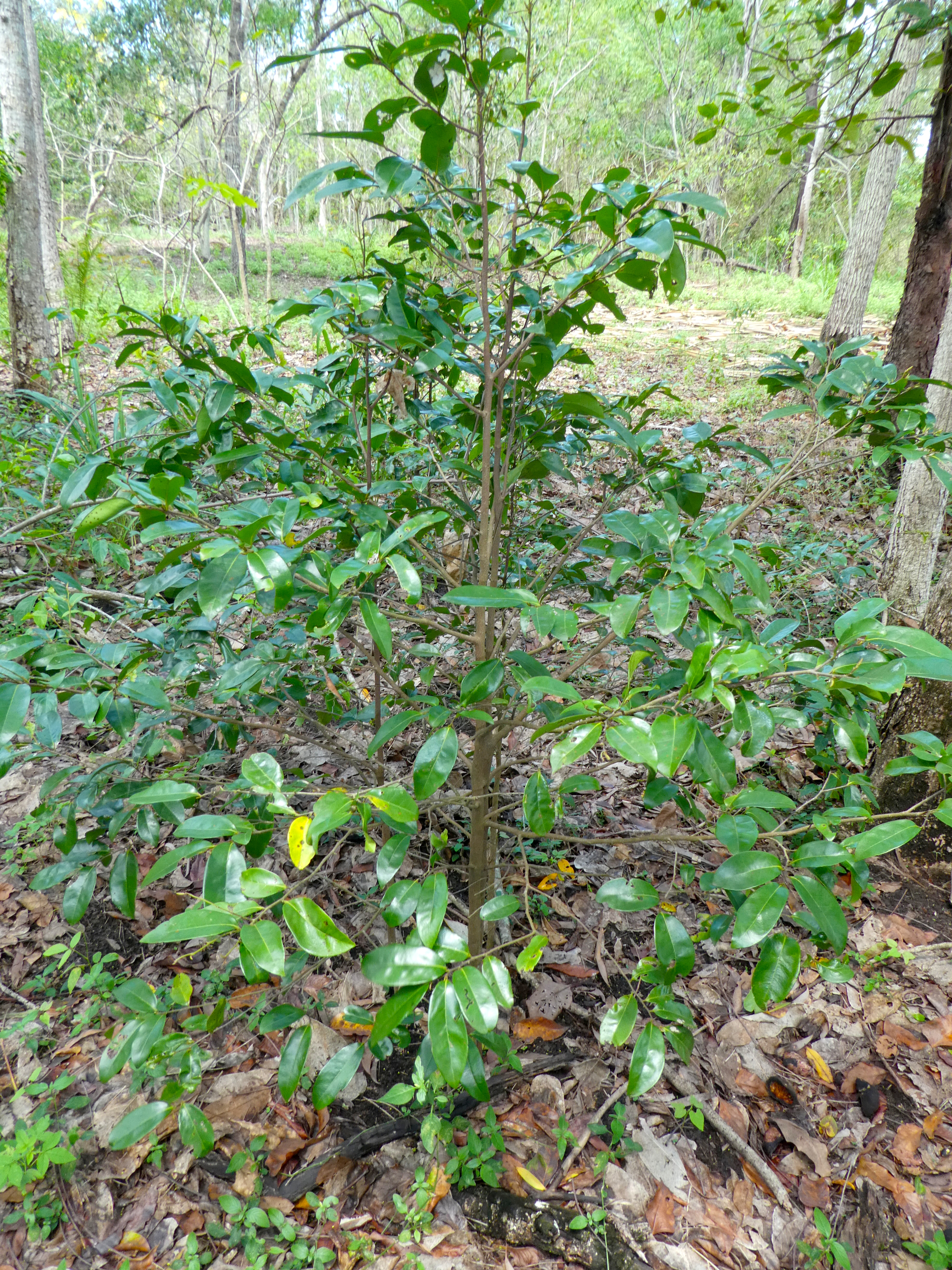

Conservation status
- Least Concern (IUCN 3.1)

Scientific classification
- Kingdom: Plantae
- Clade: Embryophytes
- Clade: Tracheophytes
- Clade: Spermatophytes
- Clade: Angiosperms
- Clade: Magnoliids
- Order: Magnoliales
- Family: Annonaceae
- Genus: Huberantha
- Species: H. nitidissima

Binomial name
- Huberantha nitidissima (Dunal) Chaowasku

Synonyms
- Hubera nitidissima (Dunal) Chaowasku; Polyalthia nitidissima (Dunal) Benth.; Popowia novoguineensis Miq.; Unona fulgens Labill.; Unona nitens F.Muell.; Unona nitidissima Dunal

= Huberantha nitidissima =

Species of flowering plant

Huberantha nitidissima, commonly known as canary beech or shiny leaf tree, is a plant in the custard apple family Annonaceae. It is found in seasonal tropical forests and along moist watercourses in New Caledonia, Vanuatu and the Australian states of New South Wales, Queensland, and the Northern Territory.

== Description ==
Huberantha nitidissima is an understorey shrub or small tree up to about 12 m (39 ft) tall. The leaves are ovate to elliptic and may be up to 11 cm (4.3 in) long and 5 cm (2.0 in) wide. They have 6–9 pairs of lateral veins each side of the midrib, are shiny dark green above and lighter underneath. Domatia are often present as tufts of hairs.

Flowers appear singly or in pairs. Sepals are green and about 2 mm (0.08 in) long, the yellow petals number six (two rows of three each) and are about 20 mm (0.79 in) long. The fruit is a botanical berry about 10 mm (0.39 in) long and 9 mm (0.35 in) wide. They may be yellow, orange or red and they contain a single brown seed.

== Taxonomy ==
This plant was first described in 1817 as Unona nitidissima by French botanist Michel Félix Dunal. In 1863 the English botanist George Bentham transferred it to the genus Polyalthia, published in his book Flora Australiensis. Later studies found that Polyalthia was not monophyletic, and in 2012 Tanawat Chaowasku published a paper in which this taxon was transferred to the novel genus Hubera. However he was forced to revise the name of the new genus after a ruling under the International Code of Nomenclature for algae, fungi, and plants, and so renamed the genus Huberantha in a paper published in 2015.

=== Etymology ===
The genus name Huberantha was chosen to honour the German botanist Herbert Huber, with the suffix -antha 'flower' reflecting the importance of floral features which separates this genus from close relatives. The species epithet nitidissima is from the Latin word nitidus (shining) and refers to the glossy leaves.

== Distribution and habitat ==
The canary beech is found in the Top End of the Northern Territory, throughout the northernmost part of Cape York Peninsula, and all along the east coast of Queensland as far south as northeastern New South Wales. It has also been observed in the southern portion of New Guinea adjacent to Cape York, and in New Caledonia and Vanuatu in the Coral Sea.

It inhabits drier rainforest types such as monsoon forest and beach forest. In north Queensland the species' elevational range is from sea level to about 800 m (2,600 ft).

== Conservation ==
As of December 2024, this species has been assessed to be of least concern by the International Union for Conservation of Nature (IUCN) and by the Queensland Government under its Nature Conservation Act.

== Ecology ==
This species is a host plant for larvae of the green spotted triangle, the green triangle and the pale green triangle butterflies. The fruit is eaten by pigeons.

== Gallery ==
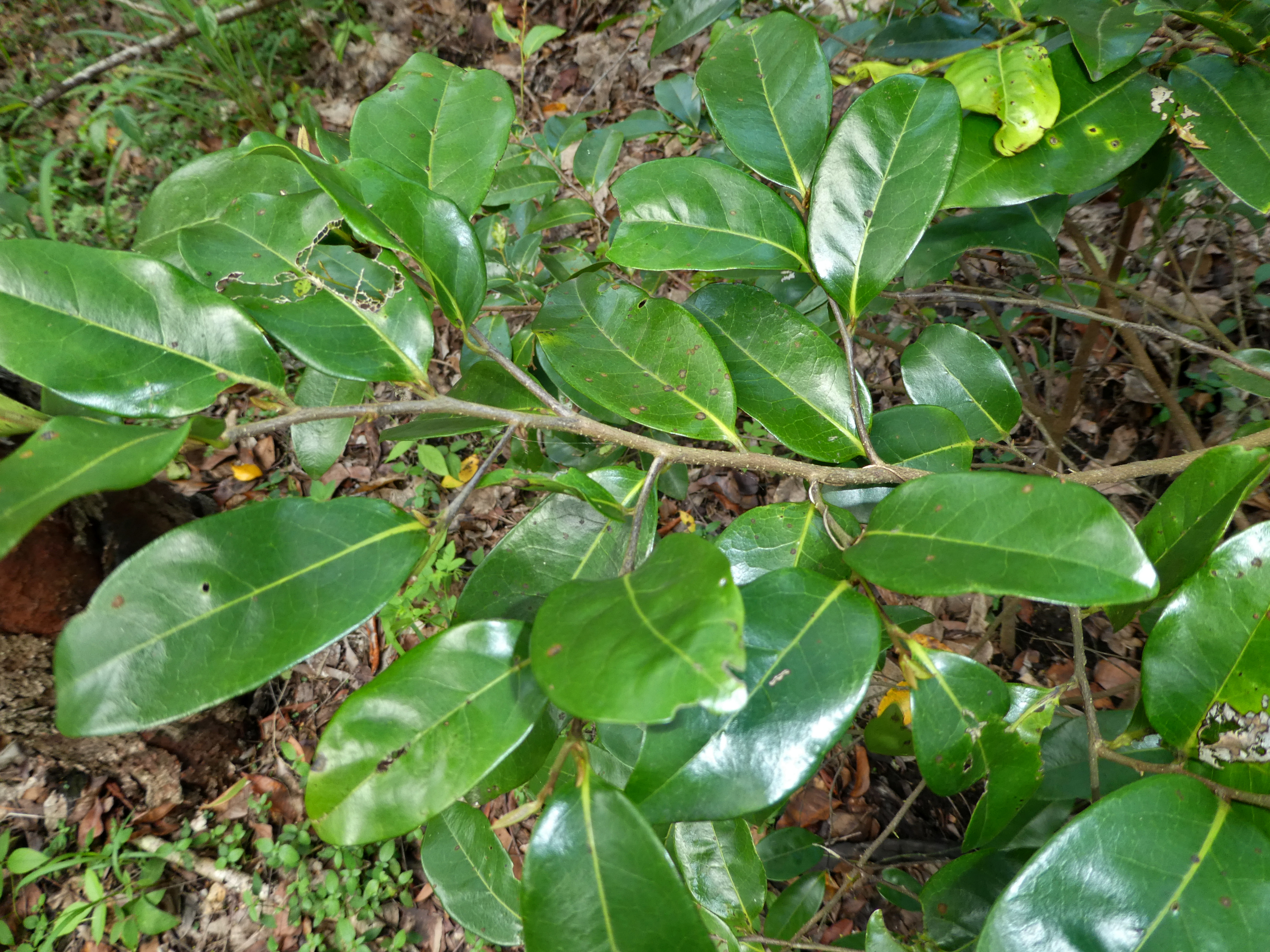
Foliage

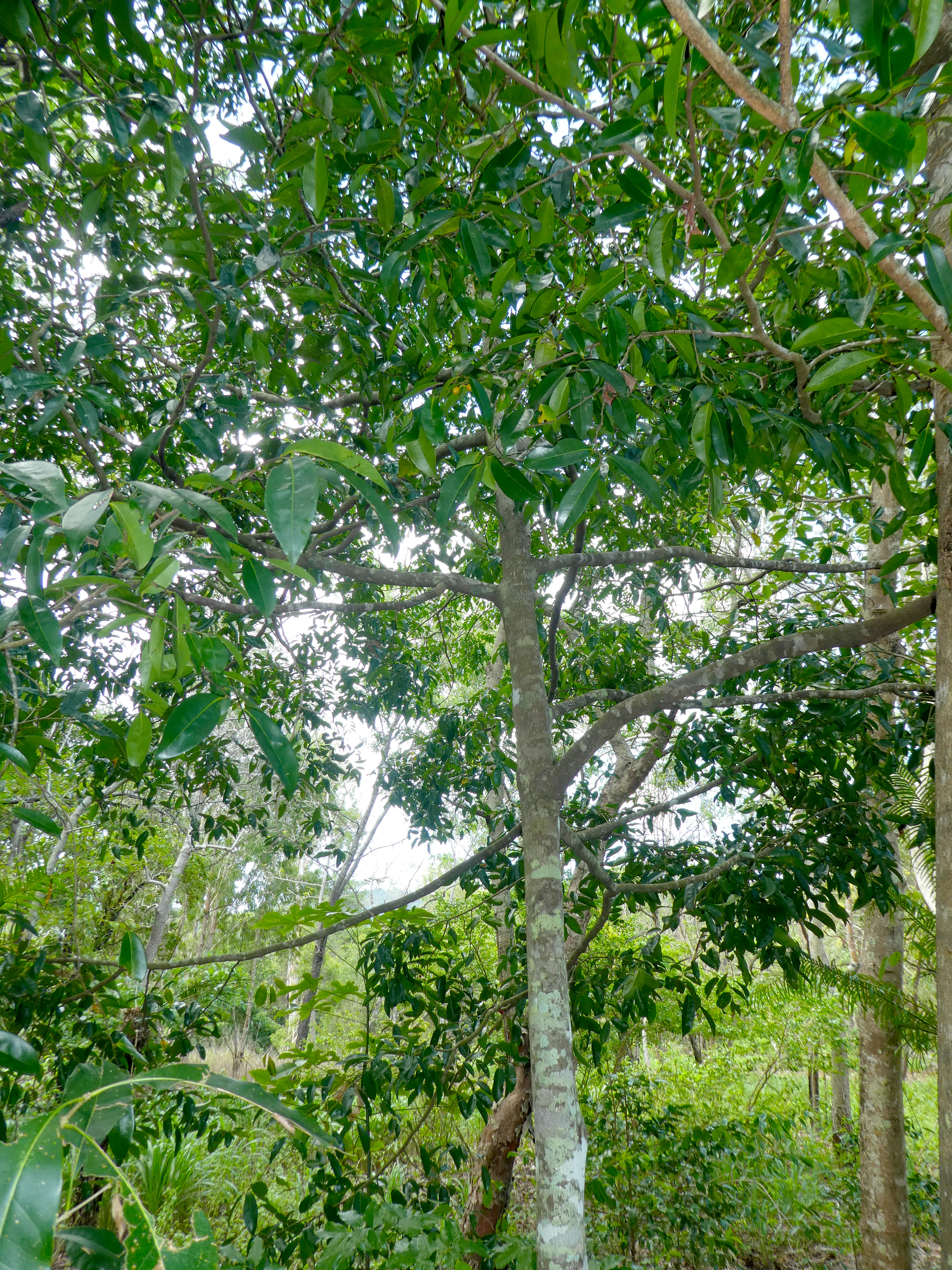
Branches

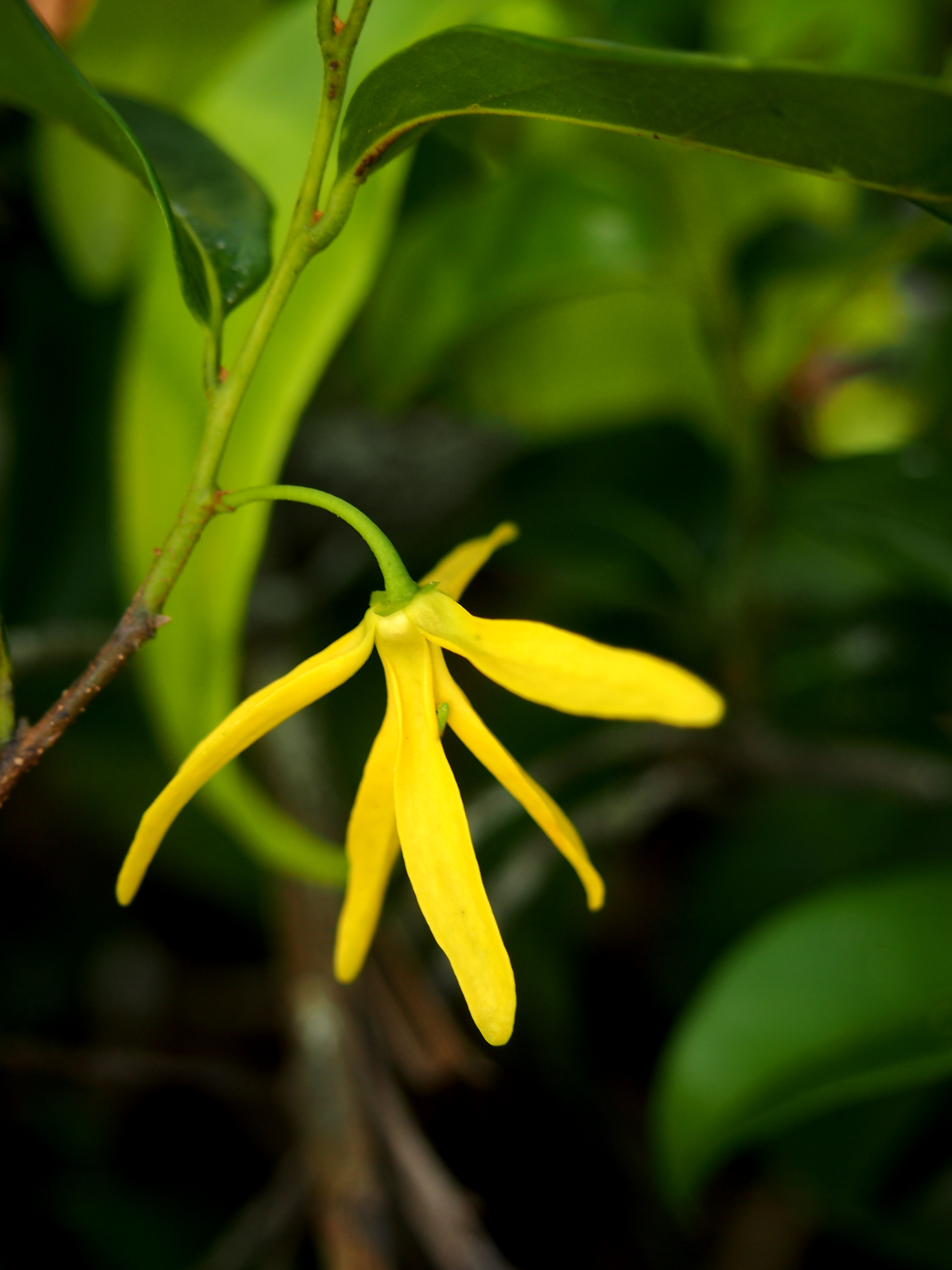
Flower

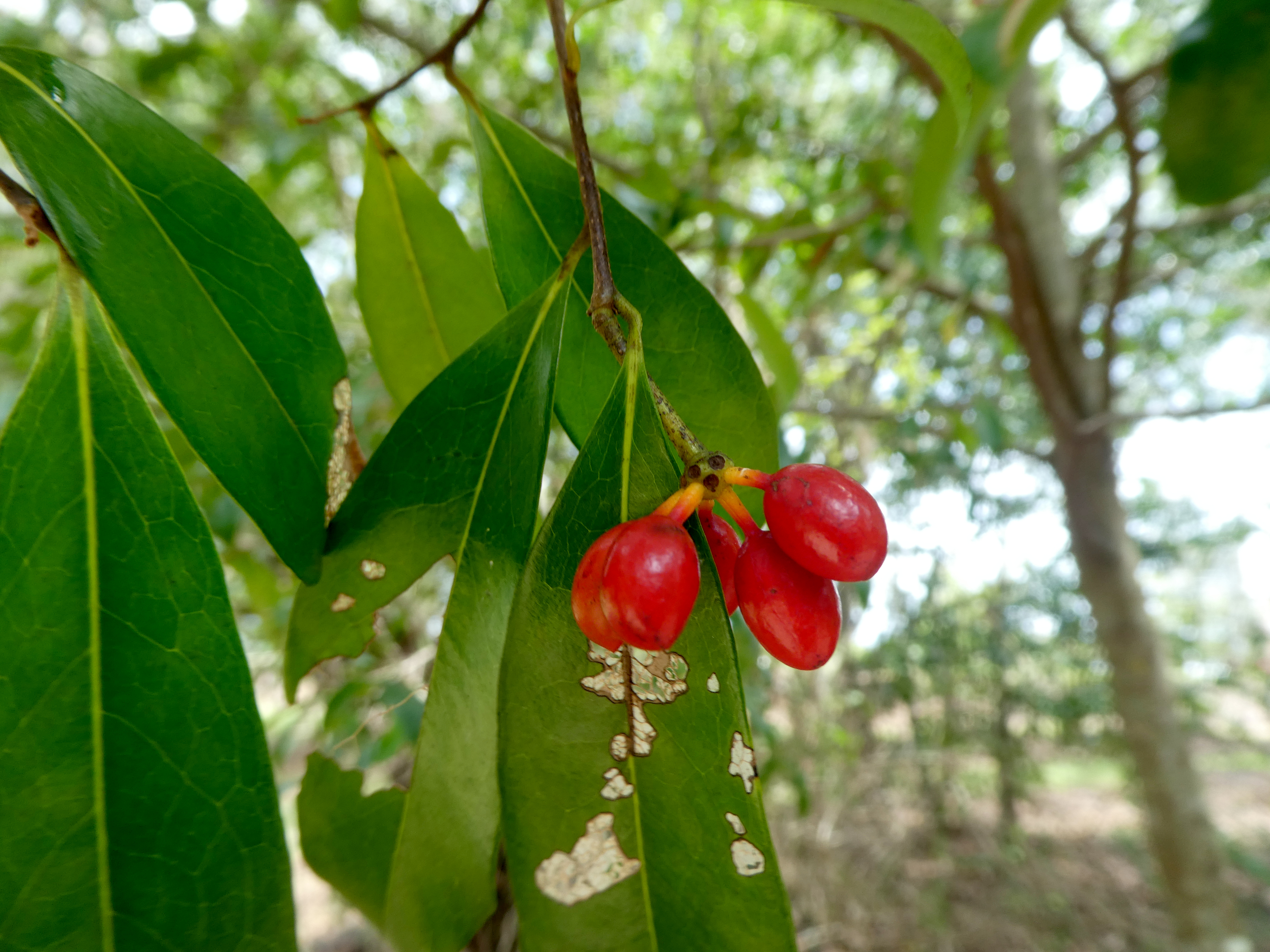
Fruit
