= Eugenia rotundata =

Conservation status
- Vulnerable (IUCN 2.3)

Scientific classification
- Kingdom: Plantae
- Clade: Tracheophytes
- Clade: Angiosperms
- Clade: Eudicots
- Clade: Rosids
- Order: Myrtales
- Family: Myrtaceae
- Genus: Eugenia
- Species: E. rotundata

Binomial name
- Eugenia rotundata (Trimen) Trimen

Synonyms
- Eugenia amoena var. rotundata Trimen

Species of flowering plant

Eugenia rotundata is a species of flowering plant in the family Myrtaceae. It is a shrub endemic to Sri Lanka.

The plant was first described as Eugenia amoena var. rotundata by Henry Trimen in 1885. In 1894 Trimen described the variety as a distinct species, Eugenia rotundata.
