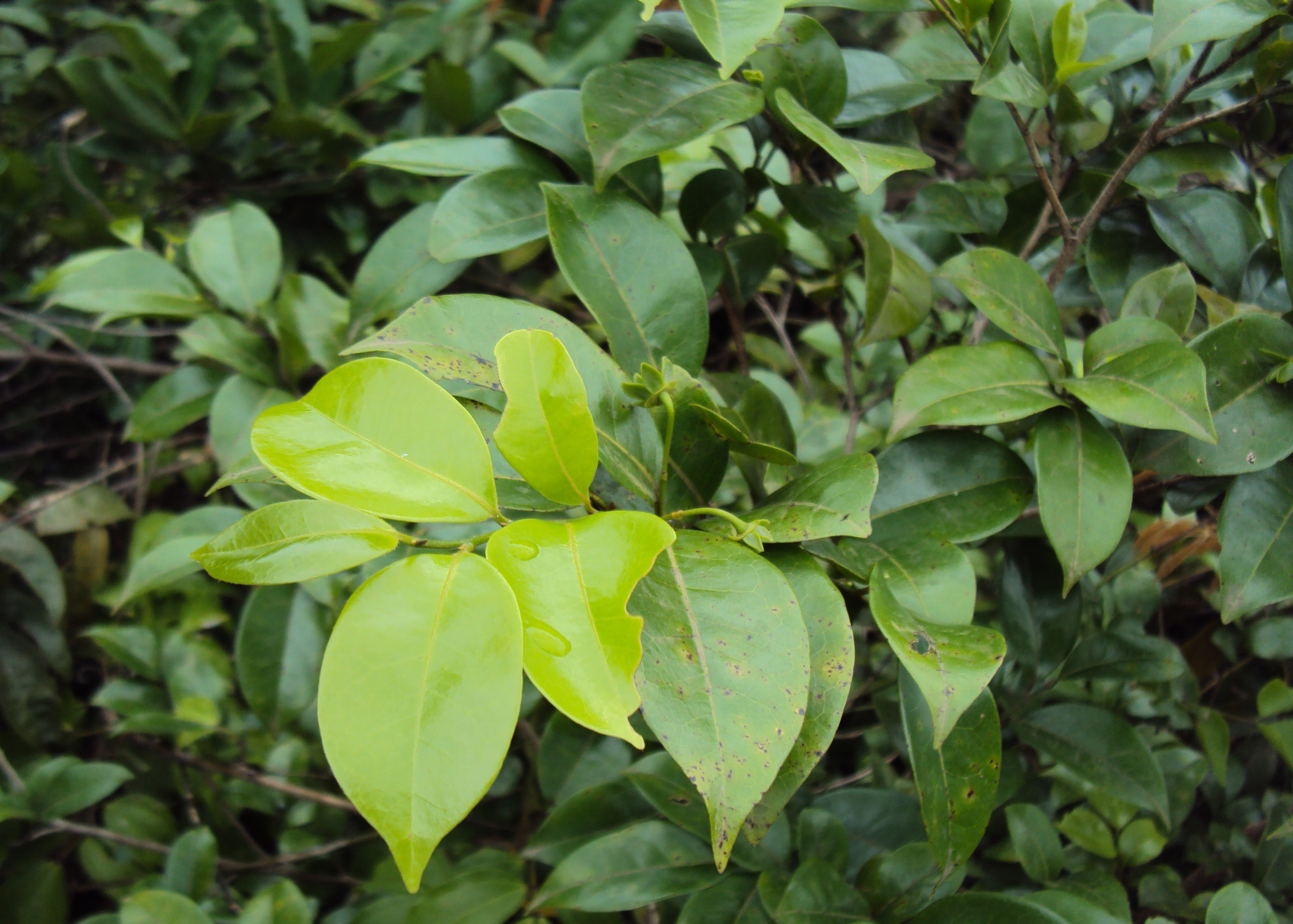

Conservation status
- Least Concern (IUCN 3.1)

Scientific classification
- Kingdom: Plantae
- Clade: Embryophytes
- Clade: Tracheophytes
- Clade: Spermatophytes
- Clade: Angiosperms
- Clade: Magnoliids
- Order: Magnoliales
- Family: Annonaceae
- Genus: Huberantha
- Species: H. korinti

Binomial name
- Huberantha korinti (Dunal) Chaowasku

Synonyms
- Guatteria korinti Dunal; Guatteria sempervirens Dunal; Hubera korinti (Dunal) Chaowasku; Polyalthia korinti (Dunal) Thwaites; Uvaria mangattensis Dennst.

= Huberantha korinti =

Species of flowering plant

Huberantha korinti is a species of flowering plant in the Annonaceae family. It is a shrub or tree native to southern India and Sri Lanka. It grows in lowland moist forest and mangrove forests.

== Uses ==
Its fruits are edible.
