= Anton Ludwig Ernst Horn =

German physician

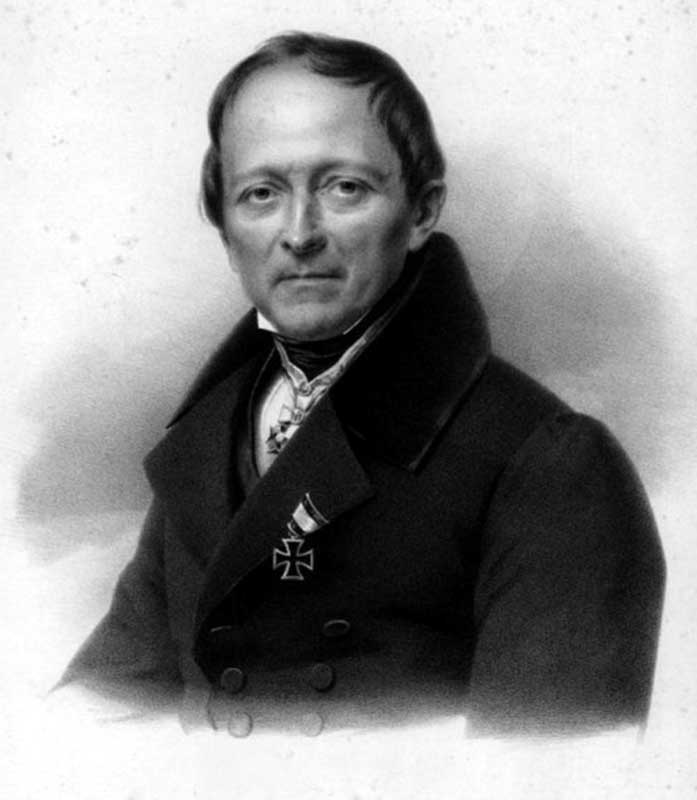
Anton Ludwig Ernst Horn

Anton Ludwig Ernst Horn (24 August 1774 – 27 September 1848) was a German medical doctor who was a native of Braunschweig.

In 1797 he received his doctorate from the University of Göttingen, and later worked as a physician at the clinical institute in Braunschweig. For a short period of time he was a professor of medicine at the Universities of Wittenberg (1804) and Erlangen (1805), and in 1806 went to work at the medical hospital at the Charité in Berlin. One of his well-known students was Moritz Heinrich Romberg (1795–1873).

Horn is considered the first practicing psychiatrist at the Charité. In the early 19th century, psychology as a scientific discipline was in its infancy, and barbaric, coercive methods were generally used to treat mental patients. Horn believed that mental illness was largely due to physical suffering, and used an assortment of mechanical devices for therapeutic purposes. He extensively used centrifugal devices such as the "rotating bed" and "rotating chair" for treatment of hysteria at the Charité, and reportedly believed that his patients derived benefits from such practices.

In 1803 Horn published a practical textbook on pharmaceuticals titled Handbuch der praktischen Arzneimittellehre für Ärzte und Wundärzte. He is also credited for providing an early description of tabes dorsalis.
