= August Wilhelm Henschel =

German botanist and medical historian

August Wilhelm Eduard Theodor Henschel (Breslau, 20 December 1790 – Breslau, 24 July 1856) was a German medical doctor and botanist, best known through his works on history of medicine and about Schola Medica Salernitana.

== Biography ==
=== Education ===
He was educated at the medical and surgical college at Breslau, the Ober-Collegium medicum in Berlin, and the universities of Heidelberg and Breslau (Medicinae Doctor in 1813). He practised medicine in Breslau from 1813 to 1816, and in the latter year was appointed Privatdozent in pathology at the university of that city.

Henschel was of Jewish origin, the son of the physician Elias Henschel (1755–1839); in 1820 he converted to Christianity.

=== Scholarly and main works ===
In 1820, Henschel published his first important work, Von der Sexualität der Pflanzen, on the linnaean taxonomy, which attracted considerable attention in the world of science. He was appointed assistant professor at his alma mater in 1821, and in 1832 professor of anatomy, physiology, and pathology.

Henschel is best known through his researches into the history of medicine, the results of which he published in the medical periodical Janus, Zeitschrift für Geschichte und Litteratur der Medizin (Breslau, 1846–49). Of his other works may be mentioned: Vertheidigung der Entzündlichen Natur des Croups (in Anton Ludwig Ernst Horn's Archiv für medizinische Erfahrungen, 1813); Commentatio de Aristotele Botanico et Philosopho, Breslau, 1824; Über einige Schwierigkeiten in der Pathologie der Hundswuth, Breslau, 1829; Zur Geschichte der Medicin in Schlesien, Breslau, 1837; and Das Medicinische Doctorat, seine Nothwendigkeit und seine Reform, Breslau, 1848.

== Works ==
The standard author abbreviation Hensch. is used to indicate this person as the author when citing a botanical name.

- (German) Schlesiens wissenschaftliche Zustände im vierzehnten Jahrhundert; ein Beitrag insbesondere zur Geschichte der Medicin (3 editions published between 1850 and 1967
- (Latin) Clavis Rumphiana botanica et zoologica: accedunt vita G.E. Rumphii, Plinii indici, specimenque materiae medicae Amboinensis, 3 editions published in 1833
- (German) Von der Sexualität der Planzen, 1820
- (Latin) Commentatio de Aristotele botanico philosopho by August Wilhelm Eduard Theodor Henschel, 4 editions published in 1824
- (Latin) Vita G. E. Rumphii, Plini indici: accedunt specimen materiae Rumphianae medicae clavisque herbarii et thesauri Amboinensis, 2 editions published in 1833
- (Latin) De Aristotele botanico philosopho, 2 editions published in 1823
- (German) Zur Geschichte der Medicin in Schlesien. 1. Heft, Die vorliterärischen Anfänge, 3 editions published between 1837 and 1967
- (Latin) Synopsis chronologica scriptorum medii aevi medicorum ac physicorum quae codicibus bibliothecarum Vratislaviensium continentur, 3 editions published in 1847
- (Latin) De praxi medica Salernitana commentatio: cui praemissus est Anonymi Salernitani de adventu medici ad aegrotum libellus e Compendio Salernitano saec. XII. MSS. editus, 1850
- (Latin) Antonio Krocker ... Summos In Medicina Et Chirurgia Honores Halis Ante Haec Decem Lustra Initos A. D. XIII. Cal. Novembr. A. MDCCC Gratulatur Universitatis Literarum Vratislaviensis Ordo Medicorum Interprete A. G. E. Th. Henschel : Inest 1. Anonymi Salernitani De Adventu Medici Ad Aegrotum Libellus Ex Compendio Salernitano Saec. XII M. S. Editus; 2. Commentatio De Praxi Medica Salernitana Compendio Et Libello Isto Maxime Illustrata, 1850
- (Latin) Praemissae sunt de bibliothecarum Vratislaviensium codicibus manuscriptis medii aevi medicis ac physicis observationes generales, 1847
- (Latin) Inest synopsis chronologica scriptorum medii aevi medicorum ac physicorum quae codicibus bibliothecarum Vratislaviensibus continentur, 1847
- (Italian) (Salvatore de Renzi and Charles Victor Daremberg coauthors), Collectio Salernitana: ossia documenti inediti, e trattati di di medicina appartenenti alla scuola medica Salernitana, 5 volumes, Tipografia del Filiatre-Sebezio, Naples, 1852 (Google book search)

== Sources ==
- This article grounds essentially on Isidore Singer and Frank Cramer, "Henschel, August Wilhelm Eduard Theodor" from the public domain Jewish Encyclopedia
