= Eugenia amoena =

Conservation status
- Vulnerable (IUCN 2.3)

Scientific classification
- Kingdom: Plantae
- Clade: Tracheophytes
- Clade: Angiosperms
- Clade: Eudicots
- Clade: Rosids
- Order: Myrtales
- Family: Myrtaceae
- Genus: Eugenia
- Species: E. amoena

Binomial name
- Eugenia amoena Thwaites

Species of flowering plant

Eugenia amoena is a species of flowering plant in the family Myrtaceae. It is a shrub or tree endemic to Sri Lanka. It is known only from Ratnapura District, where it grows in lowland evergreen rain forest. The IUCN Red List assesses the species as Vulnerable.

The species was described by George Henry Kendrick Thwaites in 1859.
