= Padhanaghara =

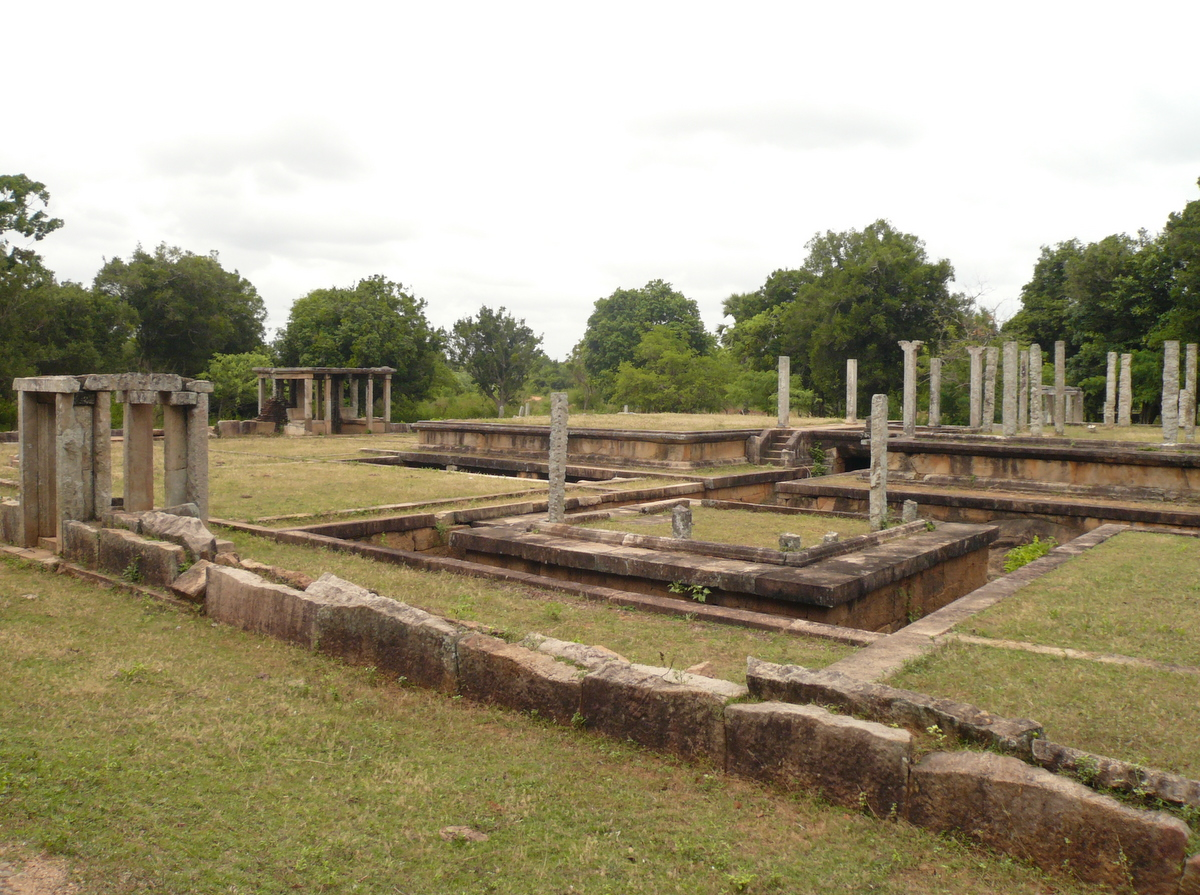
Double platform buildings, surrounded by a moat (Western monasteries at Anuradhapura)

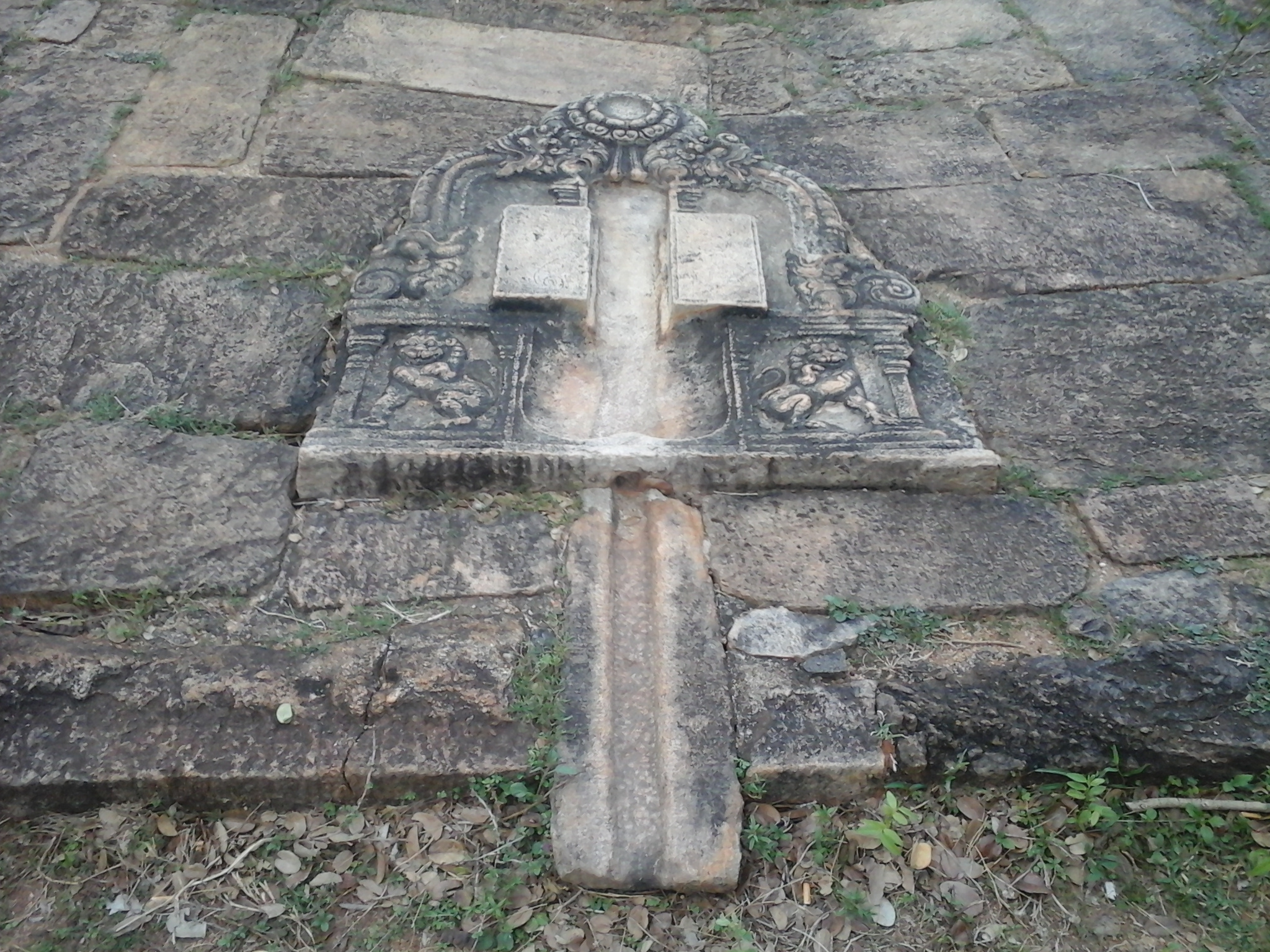
Only urinal and lavatory stones have been built with ornate carvings (Western monasteries)

Padhanaghara (Pali: Padhanaghara, Sinhala: Piyangala) is a special type of Buddhist structures unique to Sri Lanka. They were mainly built for Bhikkus who engaged in meditation. The meaning of the word Padhanaghara is given in Pali as the house of meditation. Constructed following a special architectural tradition, they are usually located at a distance from the main monasteries and human settlements. Padhanagharas became popular and developed into large-scale complexes during the latter part of Anuradhapura period. Western monasteries at Anuradhapura, Ritigala, Arankele, and Veherakanda are examples of this type of monasteries.

All Padhanaghara buildings, found in Sri Lanka have followed a typical plan, consisting of two raised platforms (Pasada and Malaka) built on a rock outcrop surrounded by a shallow artificial stream or a moat. The two platforms made out of well-dressed blocks of stones are linked to each other by a narrow but large monolithic stone bridge spanning across the stream in-between. The outer platform is usually larger than the inner platform and open to the sky while the inner platform has provisions for meditation house. Although the buildings are not decorated with any carvings and sculptures, urinal and lavatory stones have been built with ornate carvings.
