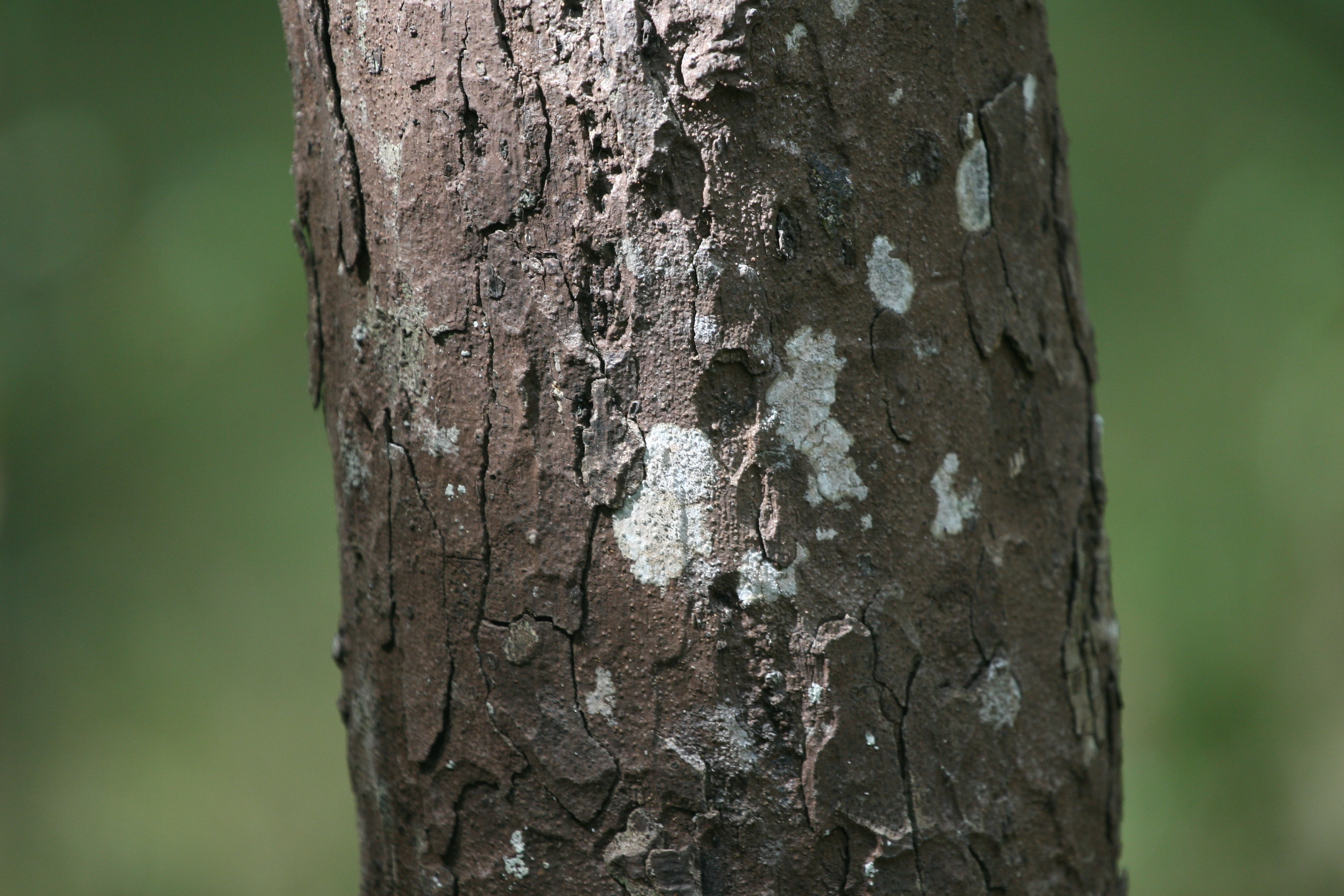

Scientific classification
- Kingdom: Plantae
- Clade: Tracheophytes
- Clade: Angiosperms
- Clade: Eudicots
- Clade: Asterids
- Order: Ericales
- Family: Ebenaceae
- Genus: Diospyros
- Species: D. oocarpa

Binomial name
- Diospyros oocarpa (Thw.)

= Diospyros oocarpa =

Species of tree

Diospyros oocarpa, is a tree in the family Ebenaceae, native to Central and North Malanad of Central Sahyadri of Western Ghats and Sri Lanka. Sometimes, it is classified as a synonym of Diospyros marmorata.

== Common names ==
- Tamil: Vellai karankali,
- Sinhala: Kalu-kadumberiya (කලු කැඩුම්බේරිය)
- Malayalam: Karunkali

== Ecology ==
Trees can be from canopy to subcanopy in evergreen forests, up to 800 metres (2,600 ft).
