= Hospitals in medieval Scotland =

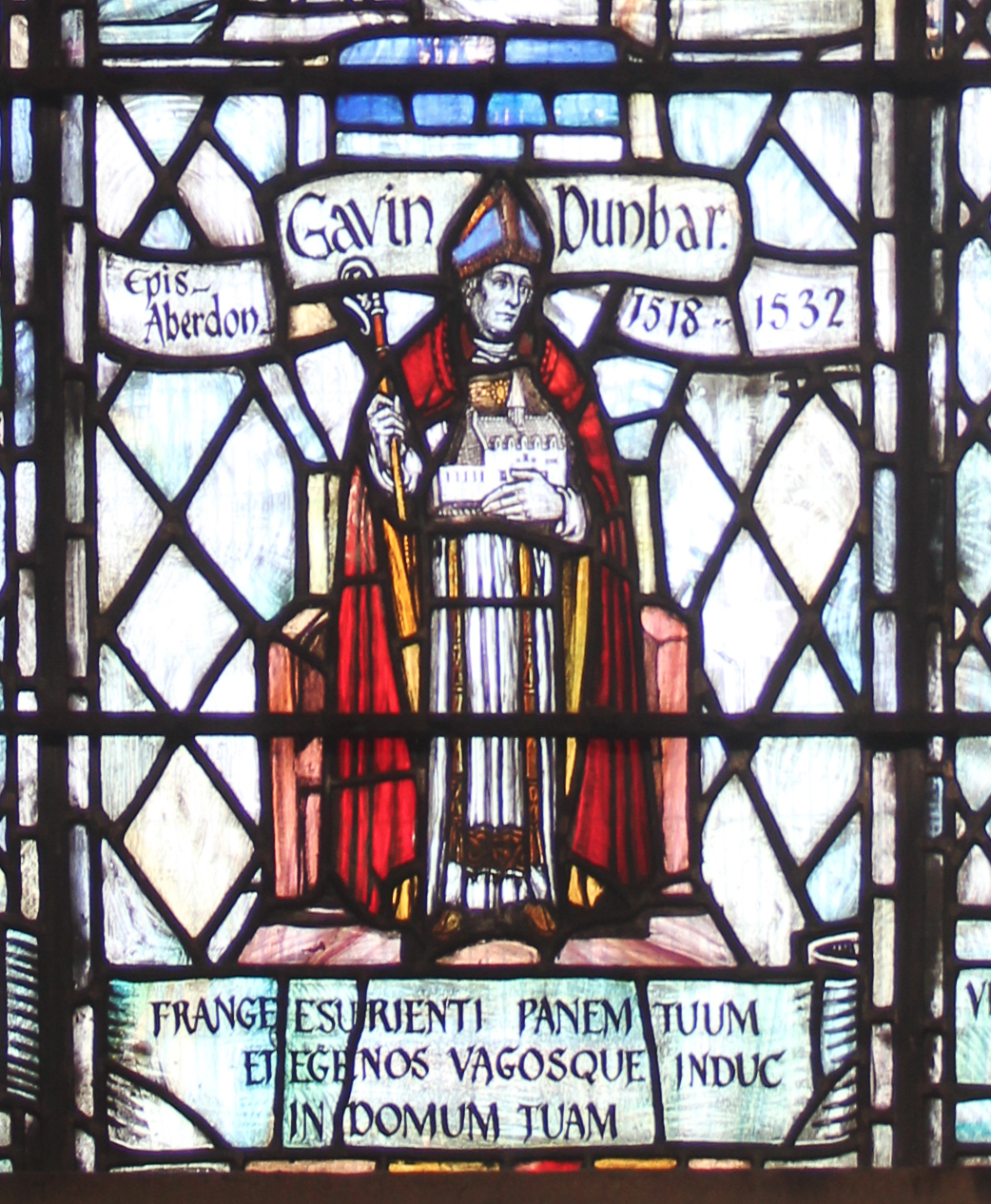
Bishop Gavin Dunbar Founder of St Mary's Hospital (1531) Old Aberdeen

Hospitals in medieval Scotland can be dated back to the 12th century. From c. 1144 to c. 1650 many hospitals, bedehouses and maisons Dieu were built in Scotland.

There are many terms that apply to, or describe a hospital. The origin of the English term, "hospital", is probably from the French or Latin. English and European terms for hospital appear to have a common root. "Hospital" – from the Latin – "a place of rest for guests". Other terms are recognized. Almshouse; bede house; (Note: The term "bede" refers to a prayer. The spelling varies with different texts. It can be "bede" or "beid" or "bead". As a result a "Bede House" is a place where prayers were said for the dead by "Bedesmen".) chantry; God's house; infirmary; spital; Domus hopitalis Sancti Spiritus (Latin); Gasthuis (German); Godshuis (Dut); Hôpital (Fr); Hôtel-Dieu (French); Krankenhaus (German); Maison dieu (French); ospedale (Italian); Sjukhus (Swedish); xenodochium (Greek).

Records provide evidence of more than 180 hospitals in Scotland. The term "spit(t)al" or "temple/templar" may also indicate land endowed by churches or monasteries as well as sites associated with the Knights Templar and the Knights Hospitallers. Many hospitals were in the north-east of Scotland in the cities of Dundee, Old Aberdeen and Aberdeen and across Aberdeenshire.

== Background ==
Close to one thousand hospitals in England, Scotland, Wales and Ireland were founded during a period of six hundred years. To begin with the causes for the building of hospitals across Europe and in Great Britain can be found in the Western Catholic Church's teaching related to Charity and Piety together that of Purgatory. In practice, the theologies of charity, piety and purgatory supported each other. Piety had three related meanings. First the sense of showing compassion; second the religious sense of Godliness and devoutness; and third, the sense of duty and respect. Taken together these meanings for piety suggest "a sense of compassion and respect driven by a religious duty". Similarly, poverty was seen as the normal condition of having few materials possessions or wealth. The nobility and royalty had wealth and influence. It was "normal" for others to be "poor". (Note: In many ways the Church’s teachings supported the early medieval civic approach to begging and beggars. See Beggar's badge.) Poverty for many was close to a state of complete destitution. The Church taught that piety was a duty born in religious conviction. Also that poverty was not necessarily a fall from grace, rather it was an opportunity to follow the Christian teaching "Blessed are the merciful: for they shall obtain mercy...." (Matthew, 5:7) In this complex of supporting and contrasting theories hospitals were built by the Church for multiple reasons. In Great Britain, it was not until the Reformation in the sixteenth century that civic authorities had to face poverty, ageing and a revised approach to charity and piety by the churches.

=== Hospitals in England and Wales ===
Before considering Scotland, the situation in England and Wales provides a relevant context.

Hospital building in England and Wales
Dates	New Hospitals	Existing hospitals	Total
1080-1150	68		68
1151-1200	191	61	252
1201-1250	164	225	389
1251-1300	152	144	496
1301-1350	101	440	541
1351-1400	71	437	508
1401-1450	69	444	513
1451-1500	69	483	552
1501-1530	67	518	585
Total Hospitals Built	952		

Out of 952 hospitals built, some 585 were still in existence when the records were collected at beginning of the "English" Reformation. (Note: At the time of the Abolition of Chantries Acts, 1545 and 1547) In England The Great Hospital in Norwich and the Bedehouse in Ewelme are well documented. An important hospital was amongst the Church buildings in York. Rotha Mary Clay provides the most definitive account of English Hospitals in the late nineteenth century. Care for the poor was not institutionalized by civic authorities until the middle of the nineteenth century. The almshouse or poorhouse can be seen as a development of the medieval hospital.

== Scotland ==
It is estimated that between 160 and 170 hospitals were built in Scotland. Based on Hall's classification comparable figures to those above can be adduced for Scotland. The nineteenth century survey in Keith et al. lists only 28 hospitals. It must be assumed that Spottiswood was selective amongst the available records. (Note: Hall's classification and register of hospitals is much more constrained than that provided by Cowan, David; Edward Easson, and Richard Neville Hadcock, Medieval Religious Houses, Scotland with an Appendix on the Houses in the Isle of Man. 2nd Edn, (London: Longman, 1976). This is in part due to a more rigorous selection process and in part due to the provision of location information often absent in Cowan & Easson.)

Scottish hospitals from 1150 to 1600
Dates – by century	Almshouse	Poorhouse	Leper hospital	Traveller's inn/pilgrim's rest	Hospice	Bede house	Unclassified
12th	3	2	3	2	1		3
13th	4	8	4				13
14th	1	4	4				12
15th	10	13	7				20
16th	5	5	3		1	1	12

The data provided by Hall are based on the known date of building the hospital. A comprehensive database of places of worship (churches) provides information on ruined buildings including hospitals. (Note: The current database has identified 132 sites with the name "hospital". Also identified are seven called "maison-dieu", and ten as "leper houses". Only three bede houses are included in this database – (1) Bede House Site, Cullen (Cullen, Grampian); (2) Bedehouse Wood Hospital, Oyne (Oyne, Grampian); (3) Rathven Bede House (Rathven, Grampian) – see above in the text.) The earliest hospital in Scotland was probably St Leonard's in St Andrews, founded by Bishop Robert of St Andrews in 1144. This was both a hospice and traveller's inn. Another early development was a traveller's inn founded in North Berwick in about 1154. Up to 1400, as many as 60 hospitals were founded. Many of these hospitals also served as leper houses or leper colonies. Cowan & Easson together with Hall identify about twenty Leper Houses. (Note: Leprosy appeared in Europe in the 11th century and by the end of the 15th century had almost disappeared.)

The best indicator of the remains or site of a medieval hospital is the use of the phrase "spital" in place names. Across Scotland, the Ordnance Survey lists 58 places with the phrase "spital" in a place name. (Note: Additionally, street names often include "Spital" or "Bede", for Bedehouse, in their designation.)

=== The north east of Scotland ===
Listed below, in a summary table, are the recorded hospital sites in the north east of Scotland. Some of the locations remain uncertain. Details of the dates founded and "terminated" are provided where known. In some cases the designation (i.e. type) is a composite. Leper houses are included, as they may have had a dual purpose. The designation maison Dieu is generally a description from land or map records. The term is usually synonymous with "bedehouse".

For details of the various sites and notes see Cowan & Easson.

Hospital sites in the north east of Scotland
Location	Date founded	Founder	Type
Aberdeen	1363	?	Lepers
Aberdeen	1531	Bishop Gavin Dunbar	Bedesmen
Aberdeen	1179	Matthew Bishop of Aberdeen	Sick
Aberdeen	1459	Master John Clatt	Poor/sick
Aberdeen	1459 ?	?	Unknown
Aberdeen	1632	Unknown	Bedeswomen
Aberdeen	1443 ??	?	Unknown
Arbroath	1352	?	Almshouse/ resident
Balgownie	1418	Unknown	?
Banff	1560?	?	Lepers
Banff	1600 ?	?	Bedeswomen
Brechin	1267	William de Brechin	Poor
Cullen	1657 ?	Findlater	Unknown
Dundee	1498		Lepers
Dundee	1390	Sir James Lindsay	Poor/sick
Elgin	1360	?	Lepers
Elgin	1360?	Bishop of Moray	Unknown
Elgin	1237	?	Poor/sick
Fyvie	1427 ?	?	Unknown
Glen Muick	1732	?	Travellers/pilgrims
Kincardine O'Neil	1244	Alan Durward	Poor/sick/travellers
Kintore	1551 ?	?	Unknown
Montrose	1245 /1516		Poor
Monymusk	?	?	Unknown
Newburgh	1261	Alexander Cumyn Earl of Buchan	Unknown
Portincraig	1187	Earl of Angus	Unknown
Rathven	1224 / 1226	John Byseth	Lepers
Spey Bridge	?		Unknown
St Nicholas (Boharm)	1235	Muriel de Polloe	Travellers/pilgrims
Tarves	1584 ?	William Forbes of Tolquhon	Unknown
Turriff	1272	Earl of Buchan	Almshouse/residents

Derek Hall provides some additional data. The table below shows the locations for north east Scotland and Dundee hospitals.

Hospitals in the north east of Scotland
Description	Place	Founded	Type	Grid reference	Latitude	Longitude
St Peters Aberdeen	Aberdeen	1179	Hospitals for the care of the sick	NJ 94000 07600	57.159224	-2.1008261
St Mary Kincardine O'Neil	Kincardine O'Neil	1224	Poor houses / traveller's inn / Chantry	NO 59200 99800	57.087379	-2.6748258
St Nichola Boham	Boham	1232	Poor houses	NJ 31800 51600	57.549345	-3.1411705
Maison Dieu Elgin	Elgin	1237	Poor houses	NJ 22300 62600	57.646592	-3.3033868
Monkshome Newburgh	Newburgh	1261	Almshouse	NK 00000 25400	57.319158	-2.00164
St Mary & St Congan Turriff	Turiff	1272	Almshouse	NJ 72000 49000	57.53028	-2.46923
Aberdeen Leper	Aberdeen	1333	Leper hospitals	NS 59100 64430	55.852419	-4.2523287
Lazarite House, Elgin	Elgin	1358	Unknown function	NJ 21000 62000	57.640977	-3.3249631
Nethergate Dundee	Dundee	1390	Poor houses	NO 39990 29890	56.457324	-2.97532
St Anthony Dundee	Dundee	1442	Unknown function	NO 41820 30940	56.466986	-2.94586
St Thomas Martyr Aberdeen	Aberdeen	1459	Poor houses Hospitals for the care of the sick	NJ 94100 06200	57.146649	-2.0991392
Dundee	Dundee	1498	Leper hospitals	NO 11000 21000	56.37289	-3.4425359
St Marys - Bishop Dunbar Old Aberdeen	Old Aberdeen	1531	Almshouse / bedehouse	NJ 93838 08800	57.169998	-2.1035385
Banff	Banff	1544	Leper hospitals	NJ 68400 63200	57.657582	-2.5312076
St Peter Rathven	Rathven	1224/1226	Leper hospitals	NJ 44300 65600	57.676796	-2.9355767
Cullen	Cullen	Unknown	Bedehouse	NJ 50860 66080	57.681873	-2.8256982
Oyne	Oyne	Unknown	Hostels for travellers	NJ 69340 23580	57.301774	-2.5104659

=== Hospitals in Old Aberdeen and Aberdeen ===
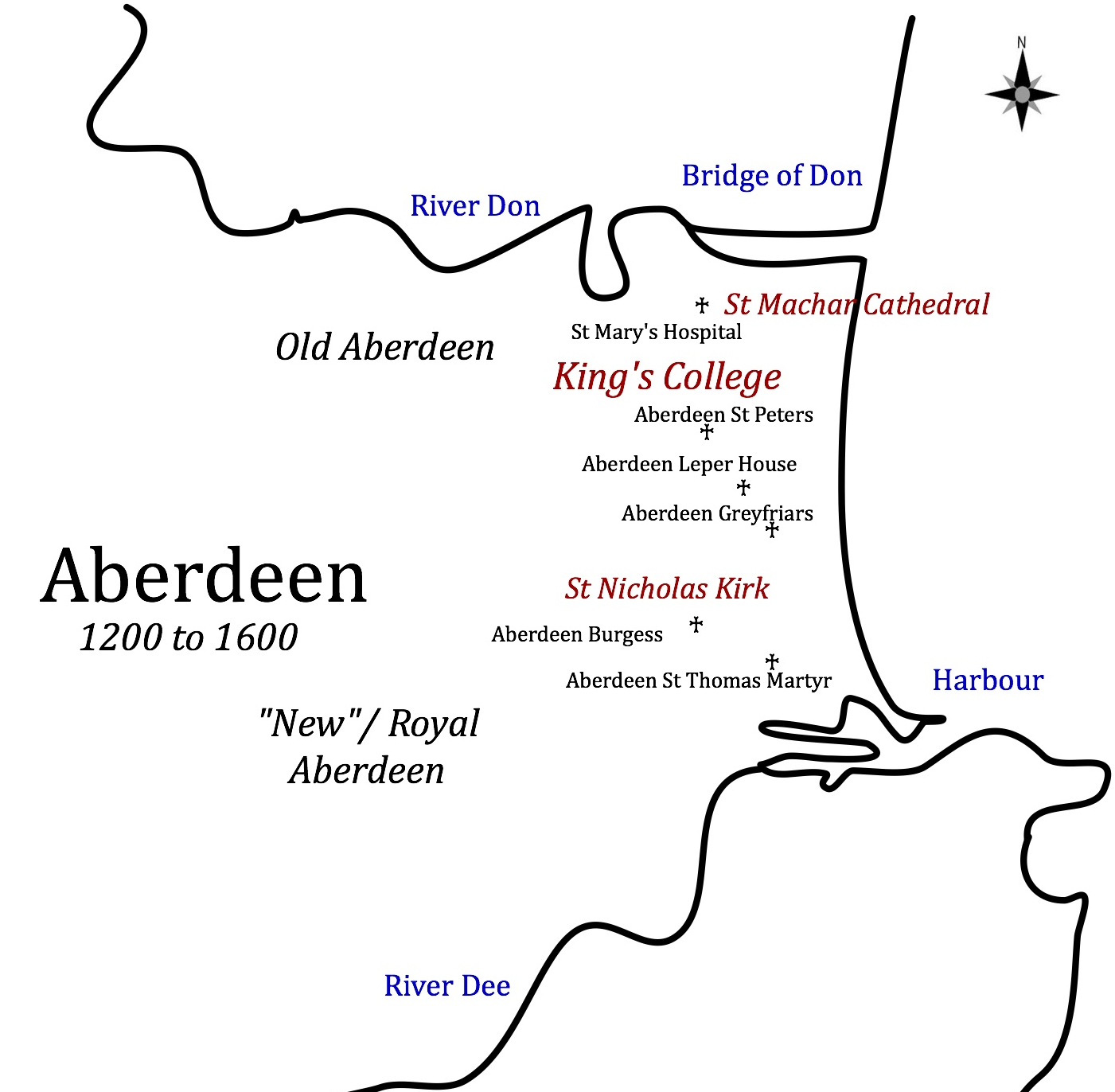
Hospitals in Old Aberdeen and "New" Aberdeen - 1200 to 1600

There are records for nine hospitals in Aberdeen and Old Aberdeen. Just before the Scottish Reformation, Bishop Gavin Dunbar founded St Mary's Hospital (NJ 93838 08800) - also known as Bishop Dunbar's Hospital in 1531. Much earlier, a hospital for the sick and elderly, St Peters (NJ 94000 07600) was founded in 1179. The Aberdeen Leper House dates from 1333 (NS 59100 64430). See map on the right.

== Types of hospital ==
It is impossible to provide an exact classification for Scottish hospitals. Cowan & Easson and Hall use differing terms. Many of these institutions were known simply as hospitals. The term "almshouse" or "poorhouse" was sometimes given to these institutions. In general, hospitals were Church foundations. As such, they served the elderly and provided care for the sick within Western Christian practice. Some would have had a primitive "hospital" function (in the modern sense) with an adjacent herbal or "physic" garden. Both men and women would have been admitted. In most cases it was elderly men. In addition, the Church instituted a class of hospital that was akin to a monastery. These sub-monastic hospitals (e.g. St Mary's in Old Aberdeen – known as Bishop Dunbar's Hospital) in addition to caring for the elderly provided a chantry function with bedesmen praying for the dead. (See Bede House, Old Aberdeen) As such they are sometimes known as "bede houses". In addition leper houses served a specific function with regard to leprosy. Hospitals, in addition to providing care for the elderly and infirm, were places where pilgrims or travellers would rest. It is likely that such institutions would have provided spiritual aid to travellers. Travellers's "hospitals" would have been on or adjacent to what are now called "heritage routes". It is possible that some "traveller’s hospices" would have been akin to the chapels built at bridges to allow travellers to stop and offer prayers for their safe transit. It is likely that any medieval hospital on or adjacent to such routes would have served several purposes.

=== Traveller’s inns ===
It would be expected that inns or hostels would be situated on roads and paths. Paths normally follow natural contours across hilly territory. North - south travel across the north east of Scotland have to traverse the Grampians and Cairngorms. Across these hills paths take advantage of gaps between hills, that is passes. There are some fourteen passes over what is sometimes called the Mounth. (Note: A ridge of hills running east to west from Durris (outside Aberdeen) to Glas Maol south of Braemar.) Recently the various paths and passes have been categorized in a project by the Scottish Rights of Way Society. These are: Causey or Cowie Mounth (Stonehaven to Aberdeen); Elsick Mounth (Stonehaven to Drum); Slug Road Stonehaven to Durris); Cryne Corse Mounth (Laurencekirk to Durris); Stock Mounth (Glenbervie to Strachan); Builg Mounth (Glenfarquhar to Bridge of Dye); Cairnamounth (Fettercairn to Kincardine o' Neil); Forest of Birse Mounth (Tarfside to Aboyne); Fir Mounth (Glen Esk to Glen Tanar); Mounth Keen (Invermarkie to Ballater); Capel Mounth (Glen Clova to Glen Muick); Tolmounth (Glen Clova to Glen Clunie); Monega Pass (Glen Isal to Glen Clunie); Cairnwell (Glen Shee to Braemar). (Note: Other south to north crossings, roads and passes increase this number to eighteen. Some of these may have served as pilgrim's routes and drover's roads during the period when hospitals were built.) (1928) provides nine crossings of the Mounth these passes are confined to the eastern ranges, especially the province of Mar. Fraser (1980) and Smith add additional routes. Additional passes extend westward towards Inverness and Nairn.

These paths had stopping places for travellers and as a result a number of the hospitals were located adjacent to or on these routes. In addition, where paths crossed rivers by bridges, fords or ferries, traveller's inns were located. It is notable that the Mounth passes also linked Castles across the whole of Scotland. This is clearly shown in the north east. It appears that the location of Hospitals on Mounth paths (e.g. Kincardine O’Neil, Spital of Loch Muick and perhaps the hospital at Boat O’Brig on the River Spey) were associated with travellers between settlements and castles. Simpson (1928) provides a detailed analysis of the Castles of Mar and their association with Mounth paths. The Cairnnamount path links Castlehill, Kincardine O’Neil and Lumphanan castles. The Capel Mounth, after traversing Loch Muick, passes Kinord Castle and the Loch Davan Motte before running past Migvie Castle. A western branch of the Capel Mounth path passes Loch Callater – to the west of Loch Muick – to Kindrochit and Braemar castles before leading towards Corgarf Castle.

There is clear evidence that hospitals were built to accommodate travellers or pilgrims on these routes. Across Scotland there are in excess of 400 "heritage" roads/tracks/routes. Of these, there are 27 military roads (e.g. Ruthven Military Road, Grampian/ Aberdeenshire); 14 pilgrim's routes (e.g. St Duthac's Way, Moray); 20 coffin roads (e.g. The Monks' Road, in Fyfe); and 108 drove/drover roads (e.g. Moniaive to Sanquhar Drove Road, in Dumfries and Galloway). In Grampian/ Aberdeenshire there are 16 heritage roads/tracks. Five Medieval roads are also considered as pilgrim roads and two (Causey Mounth and Firmounth) as drove roads.

=== Aberdeenshire and the Cairngorms ===
==== Eastern hospitals ====
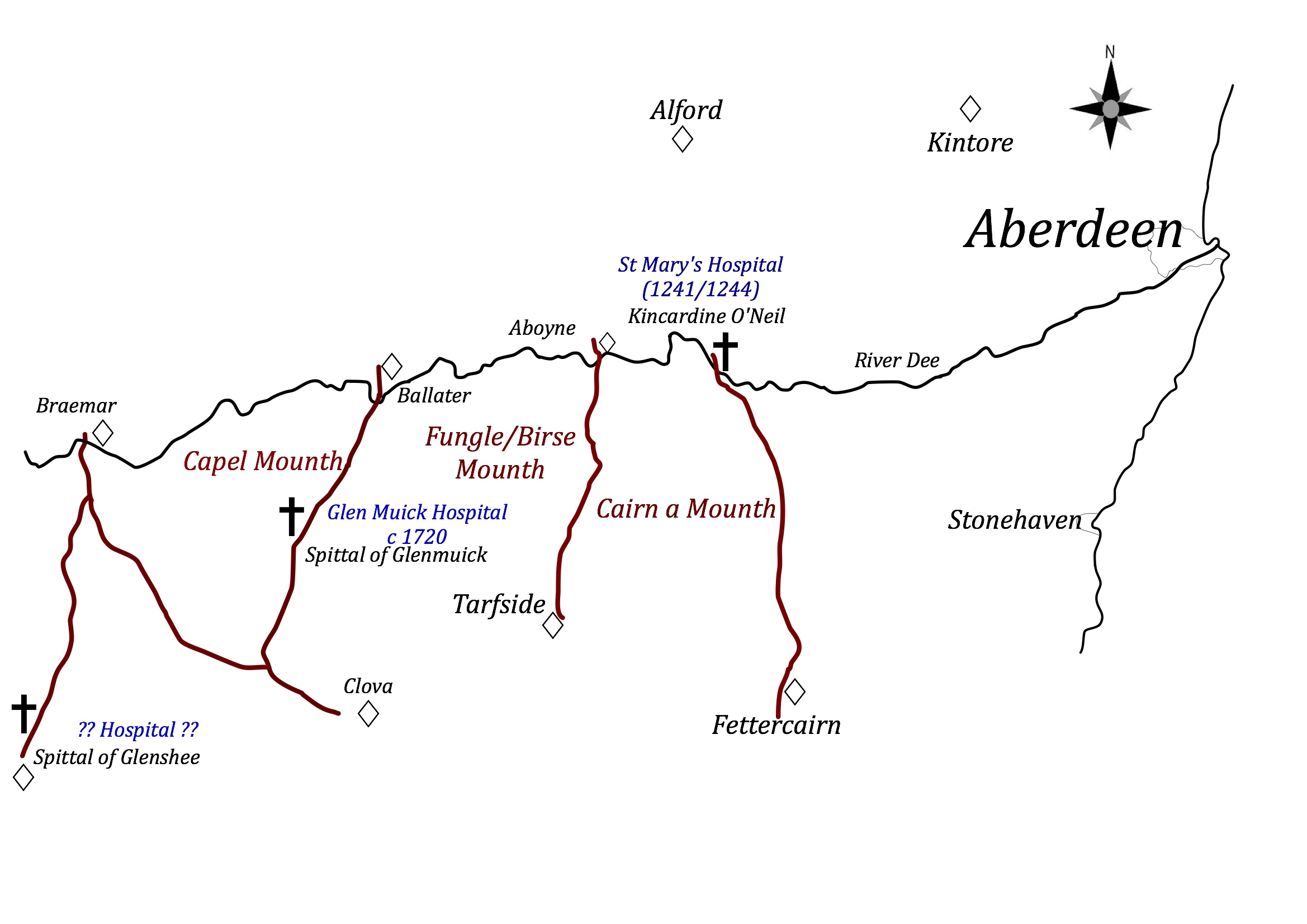
Selected Deeside drover roads - as far as the River Dee

Hall (2006) includes, in Aberdeenshire, the Hospital at Kincardine O’Neil (NO 59211 99644) which served the dual purpose of a Hospice and a Hostel for Travellers – see adjacent map.

The location close to the River Dee on the Cairn a Mounth road supports this classification. (see Kincardine O'Neil Hospital, Aberdeenshire) Of the many definite hospital sites, the evidence for Kincardine O’Neil being a traveller's inn is most persuasive.

To the west of Kincardine O’Neil the Capel Mounth, a Drovers' road led past Loch Muick and an eighteenth-century ruined hospital or traveller's inn. (NO 3074 8500). The earliest reference to it is found in estate papers.

" ....to “the sheallings called hospital haugh” allied to Braichlay, at the foot of the Glen, in 1709 (Instrument of Sasine In Favour of Isaac Fullerton, 1709, Invercauld Papers); and a sub-tack of 1754 which required the sub-tacksman to re-roof “the house in Spittall” (Sub-tack, Lewis Mackenzie to Donald Glass, 1754, Invercauld Papers).

Fraser (1931) writes:

" ...Easson states that its existence cannot be verified but Jervise says that, “... a religious house and hospice were early established at the Spital of Muick by the Bishop and Chapter of Aberdeen, and was superseded by a hostelry until about 1850 near the old site...”

Fraser mentions that "...extensive foundations of the Spital... near the loch... can still be seen..."

The Royal Commission on Ancient and Historic Monuments in Scotland provides recent archaeological evidence about the Spital of Glen Muick. In its Notes on archaeological work at Glen Muick RCAHMS repeats a claim made by Sheila Sedgwick that:

“.... The Spittal (Spittelhauche in 1600) was the highest place of abode in the Glen (Muick)... . It stood on the south side of the river, about a mile east of the loch. For generations it had been a hospice for drovers crossing the Capel Mounth to Glen Clova, and in medieval time monks ran a shelter there, to cater for travellers to and from the south by the Capel Mounth. The religious house there was under the auspices of the Bishop and Chapter of Aberdeen. In 1764 Donald Glass kept thirty sheep, twenty four lambs and a goat. Up until about 1880 the inn was a busy place. .....”

There appears to be a confusion by the authors of the report and Sedgwick with regard to the " ... monks .. (and) .. the Bishop and Chapter of Aberdeen ...".

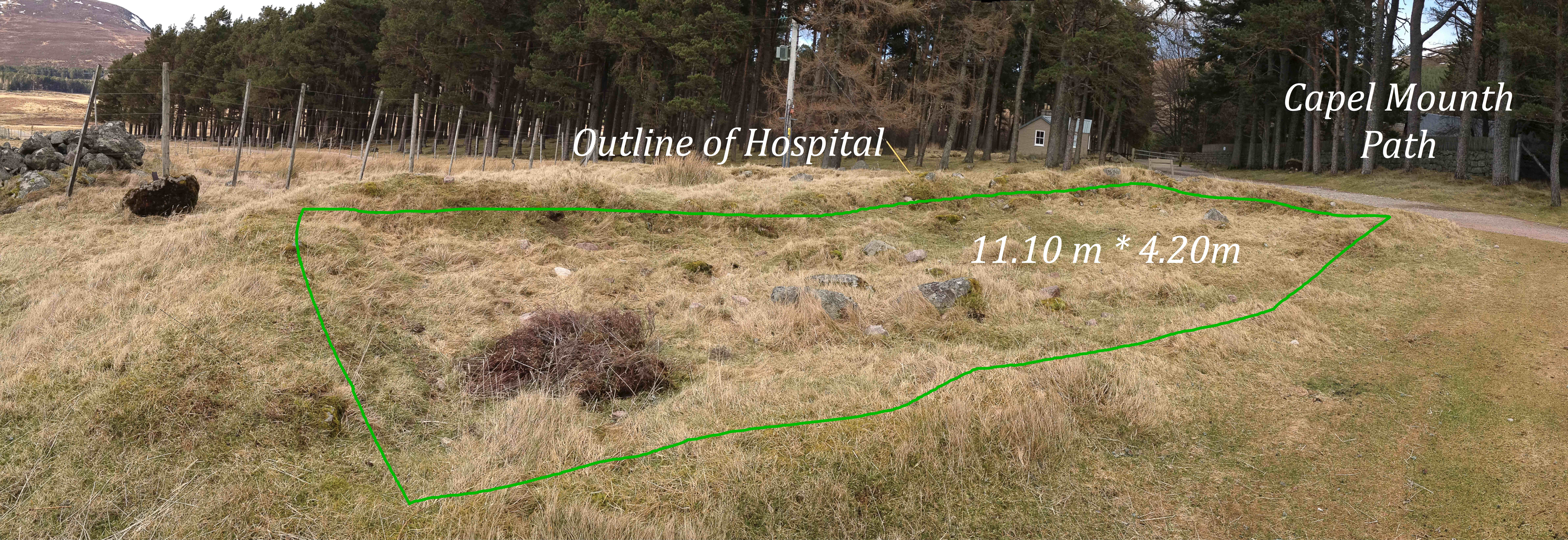
Spital of Loch Muick Hospital c. 12th century

There is no evidence of any hospital in this location run by a monastic order. It is probable that the Bishop of Aberdeen founded such an establishment. So far the specific charters from the Bishop of Aberdeen have not been identified. However, there is a charter from 1195x1197 that concerns:

...Matthew, bishop of Aberdeen, for Michael the clerk; at the presentation of Prior Gilbert de Vere and the rest of the Hospitallers in England, he has given and granted the churches of Glenmuick (ABD), and has canonically instituted him as parson in those churches, rendering to the house of the Hospitallers 9 marks...”

.

It is possible that this charter may have been misinterpreted. The "hospitallers" referred to above were the military order of the Knights of Saint John and Order of Saint John, the Knights Hospitaller.

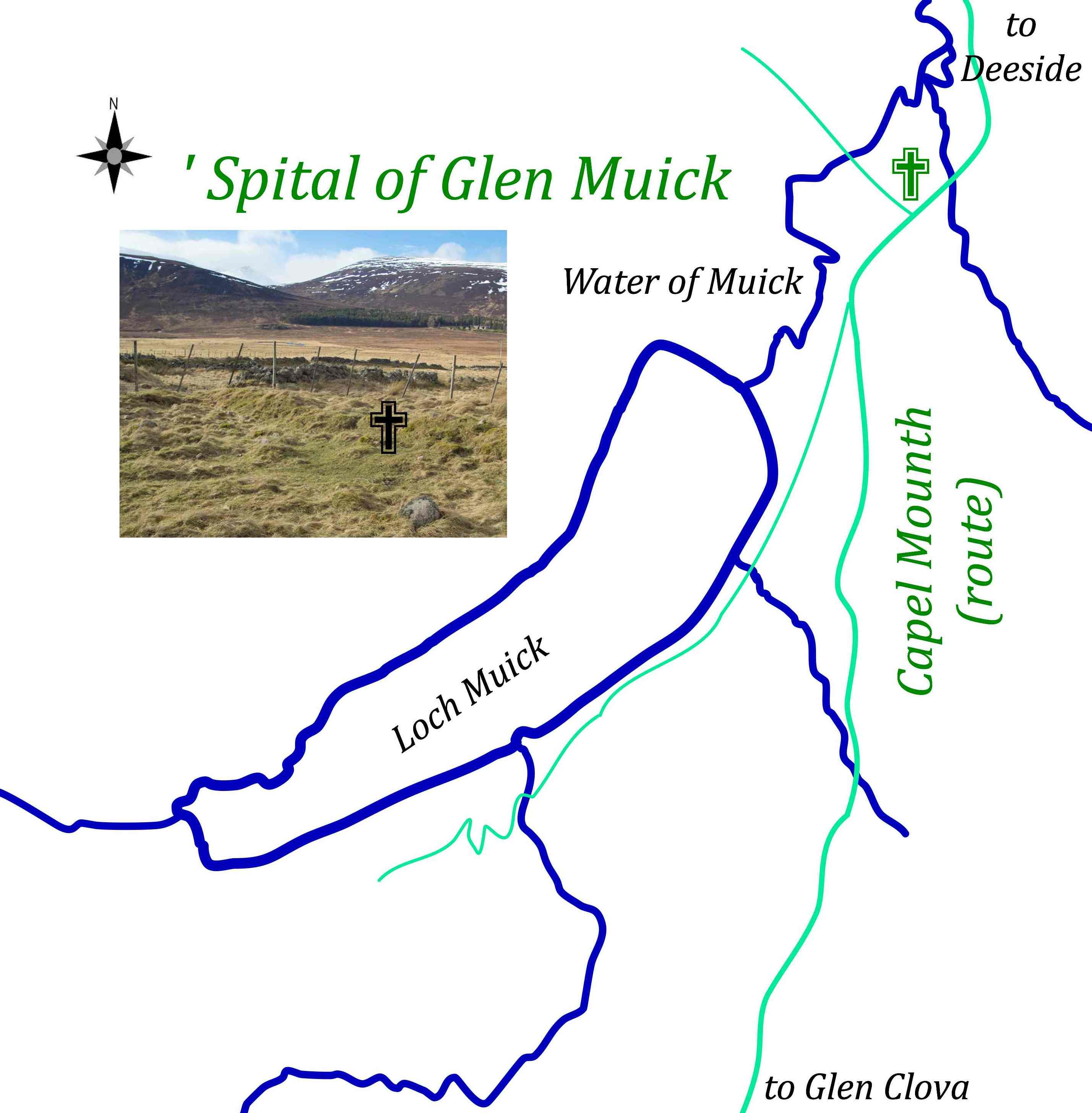
The Hospital at the 'Spital of Glen Muick - on the Capel Mounth Path

This charter suggests that the Church at Glen Muick was "given" to the Hospitallers by Bishop Matthew (Kinnimund) of Aberdeen (1172-1199).

In recent times the Visitor's Centre at the Loch Muick suggests that the hospital was founded in the 15th century and run as a traveller's inn for the comfort of travellers – akin to a motorway service station.

Sedgwick provides a detailed account (pp 107 to 116) of the building known as the "Spital" at Glen Muick from c1800. It clear that it served as an inn for drovers, agricultural workers and perhaps for smugglers. There is a possibility that in the last three centuries the building had two stories. The stones from the remains were probably used to build more recent buildings in the adjacent "Teetaboutie".

One final possibility is that this and other hospitals located on pilgrim routes or ancient drover's roads were used by travellers might have had a similar religious function to bridge chapels where travellers "rested" and said prayers before continuing their journey.

On balance there is sufficient circumstantial evidence regarding the Hospital to believe that it did serve some function for those who travelled on the Capel Mounth route.

==== Western hospitals ====
Further west a drovers' road ran past the Spit(t)al of Glenshee towards the River Dee at Braemar. While the name "spit(t)al" is normally associated with a hospital, there is some evidence that in this case the term may have a Gaelic origin. The Royal Commission on the Ancient and Historic Monuments in Scotland (RCAHMS) suggests:

“ ... It is generally believed locally that “spit(t)al” is a corruption of the Gaelic word meaning - '.. narrow pass between the hills ..' and is not associated with a hospital. If this translation is correct the name Spittal fits the position perfectly....”.

An early reference to this hospital may be the ownership of a "station" or "house" at Glenshee by the Knights Hospitallers. J. Cuthbert Hadden (1910) says:

“.. the Knights Hospitallers had a station here and performed such services as are now discharged by the Monks of St Bernard on the Alps...”

This authors also suggests that during the 16th century, it was a shelter for "belated travellers" avoiding bands of wolves.

There are some inconclusive references to a hospital at the Spital of Cairnwell, some 5 miles to the north of the Spital of Glenshee. The earliest reference appears to be in an unpublished manuscript by Keith entitled "View of the Diocese of Aberdeen. This document is printed in "Collections for a History of the Shires of Aberdeen and Banff by the Spalding Club in 1843. It reads:

“ ...Ther was an Hospitall at Cairnwall, (called Shean-Spittal, or Old Hospital,) wher ther is a road over the Grampian hills. 'Tis said ther were several other such hospitals for poor travellers passing over Granzbin....”

.

It is likely that the site at Glenshee is confused with that at the Cairnwell Pass.

An interesting example of a Travellers' Inn may be one at the Boat O'Brig on the River Spey. (NJ 3185 5167) It is first recorded in 1232. There may have been a bridge over the Spey here from Roman times, known as Pons de Spey. The hospital belonged to the Chapter of Elgin Cathedral. There is an interesting charter from Muriel de Rothes, daughter of Peter de Pollock, in 1232, part of which reads in translation:

“ ... know all men present and to come, I have given and granted and by this my charter have confirmed the Hospital of Saint Nicholas ... to serve the maintenance of the poor ...”

An ancient Drove road, going north-east from Tomintoul approaches the Spey near Craigellachie about 6 miles from Boat O'Brig. The hospital may have accommodated travellers as well as paupers. The "Registrum Episcopatus Moraviensis" (1837) reports:

“ ... It appears to have been situated at the passage of the Spey, still called the Boat of Brigg, where a new bridge has been lately erected. The hospital of St Nicholas, erected close to the bridge, and endowed for the reception of travellers, is now probably no longer to be traced. It is said that some remains of the foundations of the ancient bridge were lately visible. The super structure was probably of wood....” (f.n. pIII)

Additional evidence for the use of the Hospital of St Nicholas is provided by Shaw, L and J. F. S. Gordon in The History of the Province of Moray.

”...At the beginning of the 13th century, Muriel de Pollock, daughter of Peter de Pollock, heiress of Rothes, bequeathed her estate of Inverorkil, or Inverlochtie, where a bridge was first built by her, for an Hospital to God, the blessed Virgin Mary, and S. Nicholas (the patron Saint of all who travel by water) for the reception of poor travellers. The wooden bridge existed at the Reformation, but having fallen into neglect and disrepair it was swept away by the Spey, and its place was supplied by a ferryboat, whence the spot was termed " Boat o' Brig." ...”

There are no traces of the Hospital of St Nicholas or the 13th-century bridge at present.

==== Scottish Borders ====
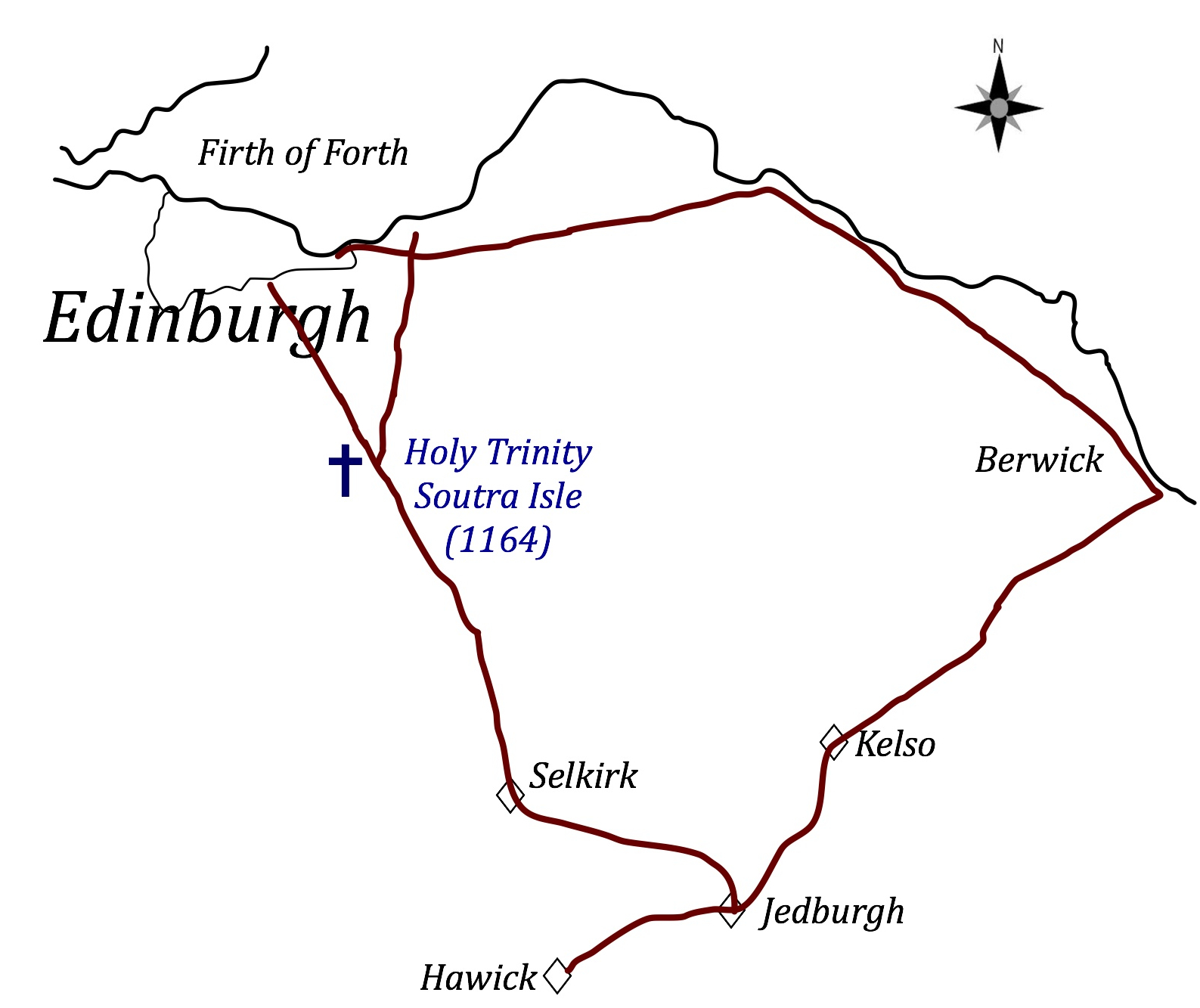
Soutra Aisle Hospital and Drover Roads in the Scottish Borders

In the Scottish Borders, a clear example of a traveller's inn is at Soutra Aisle (NT 45254 58409).

In this case, a drover's road that ran north towards Edinburgh suggests a probable association. There were two main drover's roads starting in Hawick and dividing at Jedburgh into an easterly and a westerly route north. The westerly route passed through Selkirk and adjacent to Soutra Isle Holy Trinity. – see adjacent map. It is probable that Dere Street(North) (Start NT 453 582; End NT 482 545) is the likely route. The RCAHMS records the evidence as:

“ ... Soutra Hospital is said to have been founded by Malcolm IV in 1164, for lodging travellers, but the foundation was probably somewhat earlier. In 1236, specific mention is made that the rule of St Augustine shall be observed, and it is called the house or hospital of the Holy Trinity. Reference to residents in the hospital are found up to 1583-4, but in the 17th C., it is described as utterly ruined....”.

=== Leper houses / hospitals ===
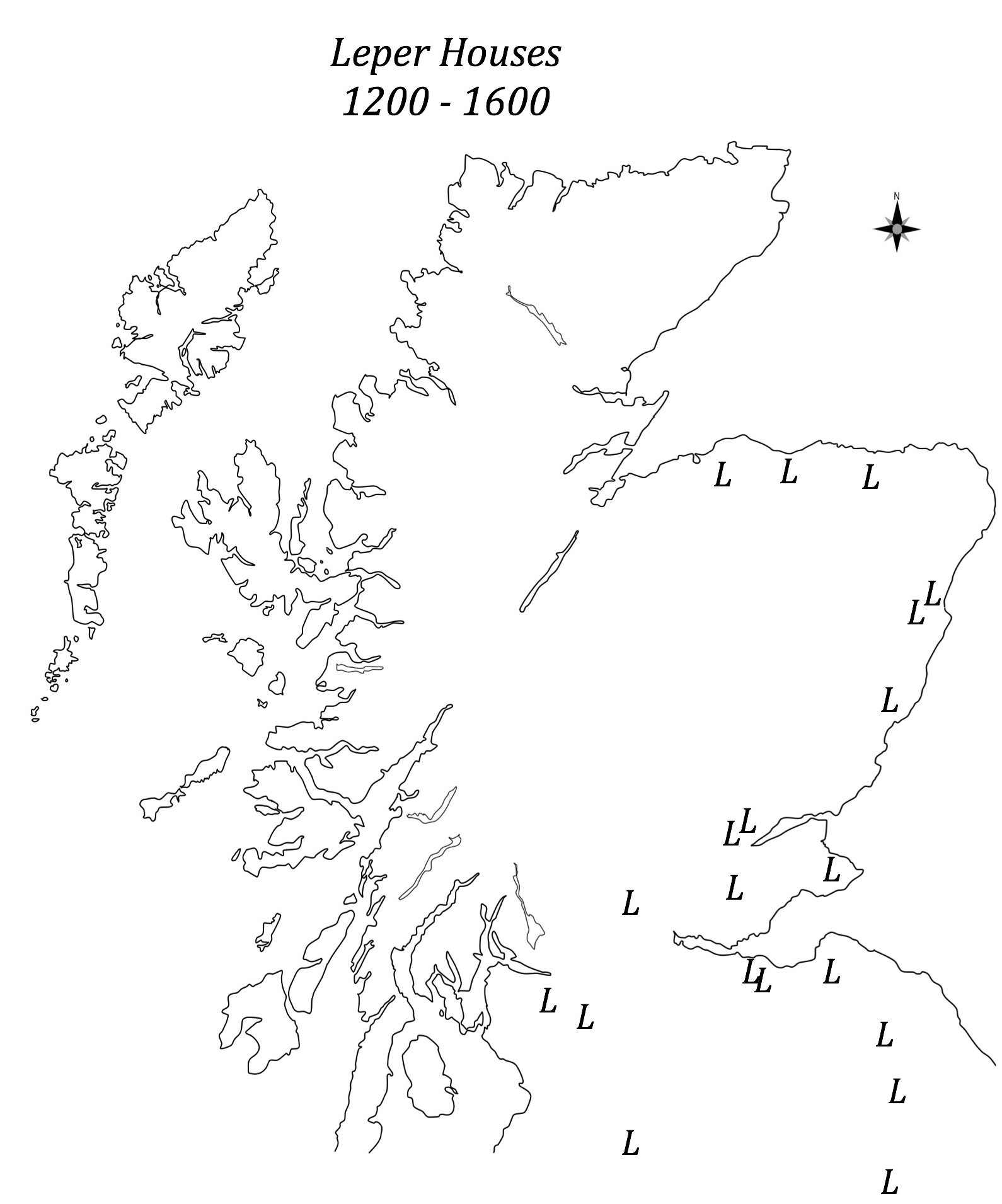
Leper houses in Scotland: 1200 to 1600

It is normal to include leper hospitals, leper colonies or lazar-houses in any classification of Medieval Hospitals. Both Cowan & Easson and Hall identify buildings where those suffering from leprosy were looked after. Leprosy or Hansen's Disease (lepra tuberculosa), may have come into Britain in the 4th century with Roman soldiers. The disease became a serious problem, north and south of the border, by the middle of the 11th century. By the late 16th century hospitals in Scotland were no longer considered necessary to care for lepers.

The origin of the Leper hospital draws on two contrasting aspects of the Christian theology of charity, firstly a conflict between "inclusion with care" and "exclusion with care". Christian New Testament teaching emphasized the need for "inclusion with care". Second, and in contrast, Third Council of the Lateran (1179) of the Medieval Western Christian Church subscribed to a policy of exclusion. The translation of Canon 23 of the Third Council of the Lateran makes it clear that "charity in exclusion" was the policy of the Bishops:

“...we decree, in accordance with apostolic charity, that wherever so many are gathered together under a common way of life that they are able to establish a church for themselves with a cemetery and rejoice in their own priest... let them take care, however, not to harm in any way the parochial rights of established churches. For we do not wish that what is granted them on the score of piety should result in harm to others...”

This was more in tune with an Old Testament Jewish tradition found in Deuteronomy.

In Old Testament Biblical times, leprosy was prevalent in Palestine. Not only was it looked upon as a divine punishment, but at all times the Hebrews believed it to be contagious and hereditary, hence it was considered as a cause of defilement and involved exclusion from the community. In his seminal work on leprosy, Sir James Simpson writes:

"...laws were enacted by Princes and Courts to arrest (lepsosy’s) diffusion, the Pope issued. Bulls with regard to the ecclesiastical separation and rights of the affected, a particular order of knighthood was instituted to watch over the sick, and leper hospitals or lazar-houses were everywhere instituted to receive the victims of the disease..."

Often leper hospitals were sited on roads into and out of towns. Many of the hospitals were civic foundations. Some were connected with cathedrals. The Elgin Leper House, founded in 1360, may have been under the supervision of Elgin Cathedral. In Scotland leper houses were generally under the control of a "custos" (i.e. a guard) and sometimes a prior. Overall, records show that some 20 leper hospitals were built between 1200 and 1600. The sites are marked with an L on the adjacent map.

=== Bede houses ===
The term "bede house" is sometimes applied to poorhouses or almshouses. Strictly, the designation should only apply to hospitals where the male residents lived a sub-monastic life as bedesmen. That is, they followed Divine Office throughout the day and said or heard prayers for the dead. The term "bede" comes from the old root of "prayer". It is likely that many of the hospitals built between the eleventh century and the Reformation in Scotland followed this practice. After the Reformation, residents of some hospitals were often called bedesmen. St Mary's Hospital – known as Bishop Dunbar's Hospital in Old Aberdeen – was a bede house. (NJ 93844 08795) It is likely that the almshouse at Newburgh, Aberdeenshire (NK 00000 25400) served as a bedehouse. In the foundation charter Alexander Comyn, 2nd Earl of Buchan writes:

“...nouerit uniuersitas vestra nos diuine caritatis intuitu et pro salute anime nostre et Isabelle comitisse sponse nostre et pro animabus antecessorum nostrorum et successorum nostrorum dedisse concessisse et hac presenti carta confirmasse sex pauperibus prebendariis apud nouum burgum in Buchane ... “

Translated:

“... (be it) known to all of you that we divine the sake of charity and for the salvation of our soul, and Isabella countess of our spouse, and for the souls of our ancestors and of our successors, have given, granted and by this present charter have confirmed to the six to the poor prebendaries with the new burgh and their successors in the same place for the sake of alms in the Buchan... “

The wording of the charter is typical for a hospital set up as a "chantry" to house priests to say prayers for the dead, in this case Alexander and Elizabeth (Isabella) de Quincy, his wife. Alexander died in 1289 and his wife in 1282. There are no remains of the hospital visible in the village of Newburgh. It is likely that any remains were covered by an inn in the 18th century. It is possible that the Pittodrie Bede House in Aberdeenshire was a Travellers' Inn. However, the foundation date - c. 1639 suggests that the residents did not follow Divine Office. Recent archaeological work has found evidence of a two story building. (NJ 69330 23560). The data provided by Hall (2006) lists six bedehouses. (See the table below.) This is an uncertain classification as pre-Reformation hospitals would require bedesmen to say prayers for the dead and following Divine Office. Before the Scottish Reformation most hospitals would have been ordered on a religious regime, and as a result the term "bedesman" was self-evident in common parlance.

Bedehouses in Scotland
Hall (2006) description	Place	Latitude	Longitude	Founded – where known
St Marys - Bishop Dunbar Old Aberdeen	Old Aberdeen	57.169997	.10305385	1531
St John Baptist Corstorphine	Edinburgh	55.913622	-4.8816252	1538
Buchannan's Hospital Dumbarton	Dumbarton	55.943063	-4.5666828	1636
Pittodrie	Pittodrie Bede House - Aberdeenshire	57.301594	-2.5106293	Possibly 1639
St John the Baptist	Edinburgh	55.940665	-3.2823293	1538
Monkshome, Newburgh	Aberdeenshire	57.319159	-2.0016443	1261 - Alexander Comyn - 2nd Earl Buchan
Cullen	Cullen - Aberdeenshire	57.301774	-2.5104659	Unknown

Hall's classification of almshouse or poorhouse would have contained hospitals that were known locally as bedehouses. St Mary's Wynd Hospital (1438) in Edinburgh (NT 2618 7354) was probably a bedehouse for women. It is possible that the hospital at Rathven (NJ 4433 6568) may have served as a bedehouse for some time. Cowan and Easson (p 153) say it was founded in 1224/6 by John Byseth for a "...Chaplain, seven lepers and a servant...". There is evidence that in the nineteenth century, this "hospital" served elderly men in a similar fashion to the bedehouse in Old Aberdeen.

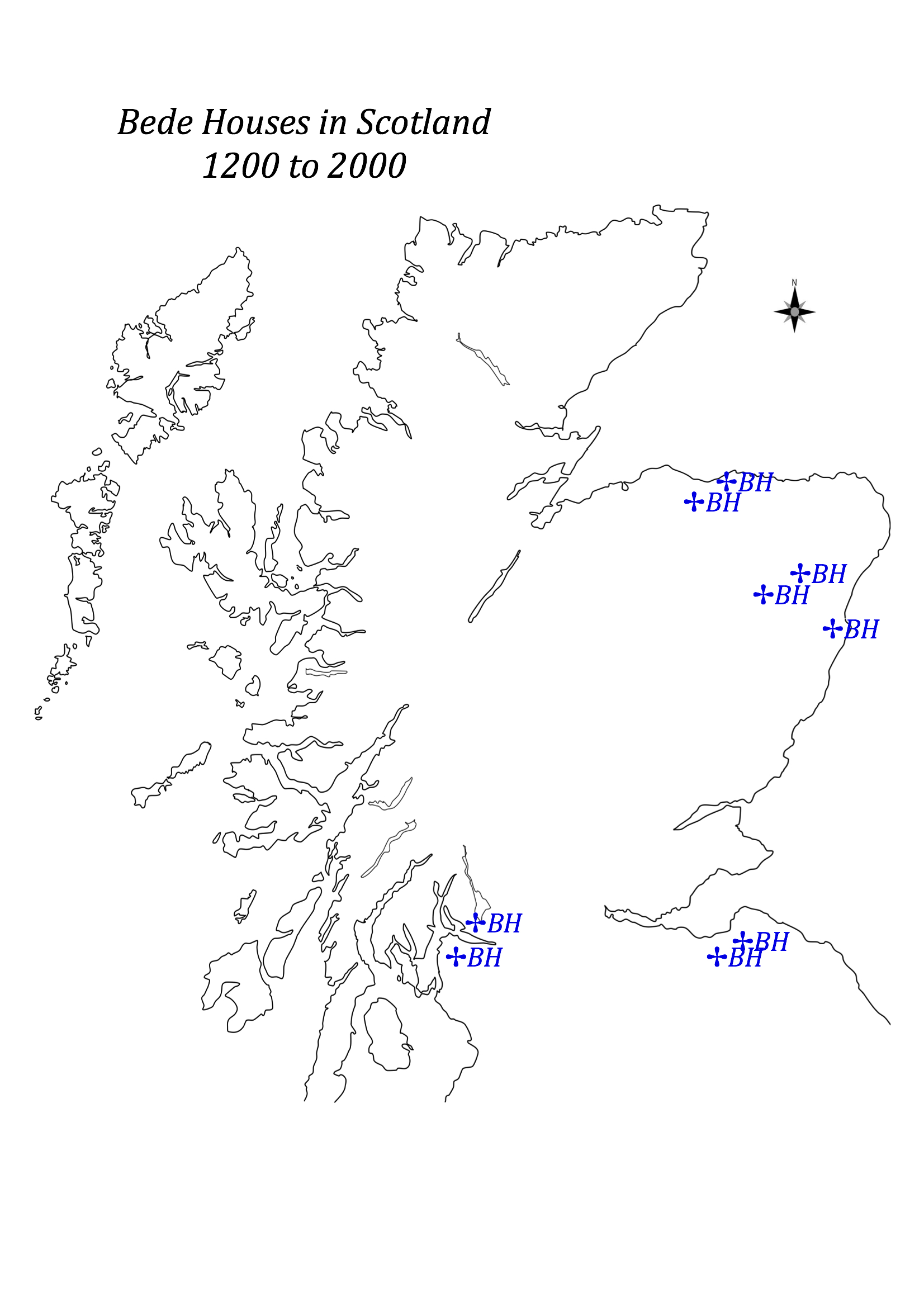
Bede Houses in Scotland

"There is a Bede-House still in being, though in bad repair, and six bede-men on the establishment; but none of them lives in the house. The nomination to a vacancy is in the gift of Lord Findlater, as proprietor of Rannes; and the yearly income of the bede-men is as follows: from the lands of Rannes, every bede-man has half an acre of land during life, and one boll of oat-meal annually; from the lands of Findochtie, eight shillings, a penny and a farthing; and from Freuchnie, formerly part of the lands of Rannes, one shilling, four pence and three farthings, making in all nine shillings and sixpence yearly."(The Statistical Account of Scotland, xiii. p, 412.)

Also:

"The Bede-House is still standing in the village of Rathven, and was very lately repaired: two of the six bede-men, who are still maintained on the establishment, at present live in the house."(The New Statistical Account of Scotland, xxxviii. p. 268.)

The Bedehouse in Tarves (NJ 87491 30824) founded by William Forbes of Tolquhon in 1684 is post Scottish Reformation but the term "bedesmen" was used for 4 resident men for many years. It was claimed that:

“...in return for food clothing a stipend and lodging the poor men had to attend the local church to pray for the founder’s soul..."

This reference to Bedesmen saying prayers for the dead has to be considered very carefully. Prayers for the dead were not considered necessary or theologically sound by the Reformed Church in Scotland. Further, after the Scottish Reformation some parishes were slow to adopt change from Pre-Reformation practice. Across the NE of Scotland parishes of both the “Scottish Episcopal Church” and the Reformed “Church in Scotland” varied in the way each church choose to treat bedesmen. In general, more Episcopal parishes continued to hold this practice. The Tarves bedehouse is also known as "Boghouse". In Illustrations of the Topography and Antiquities of the Shires of Aberdeen (p. 330) the description of the parish of Tarves claims:

"…here is a hospital (hard by the church) founded by William Forbes of Tolquhon for four poor men who were to eat and lye here and to have each a peck of meal and three shillings a penny and two-sixths of a penny, Scots, weekly: also, some malt, peats etc. The meal and money they still have; but their house which is slated is neglected and quite waste…”

Overall, the designation "bedehouse" is ambiguous. (See adjacent map) It appears that in common parlance the term "bedesman" was applied to any resident of almshouses, poor houses, maison-dieu and possibly former leper houses, or those supported by hospital trusts after the Scottish Reformation (1559/1560).

== Summary ==
Medieval hospitals or "spitals" provide a record of the development of help for the poor, the sick and the widowed. Hospitals built between 1144 and c1650 highlight the many changes to the landscape, the settlements and the people who lived in Scotland. It is impossible to put a religious boundary around the period of hospital building as the social values developed pre-Reformation were continued for at least hundred years after 1559. The names of hospitals record epidemics such as leprosy. Their locations give a clue to the way travellers, drovers and perhaps smugglers traversed the landscape. The foundation of sub-monastic bede houses highlights the importance of prayers for the dead and a belief in Purgatory in the pre-Reformation Catholic Church. Mortifications setting up hospitals etc. record the influence and wealth of the nobility and the Church. The remains of medieval hospitals can still be seen. (Note: e.g. Soutra Aisle, Scottish Bedesmen, Kincardine O'Neil Hospital, Aberdeenshire.) Their existence throws light on life in Scotland, England and Wales and Europe to this day.

== See also ==
- Aberdeen poorhouses
- Aberdeen trades hospitals
- Scottish Bedesmen
- Beadsman
- Beggar's badge
- Bishop Dunbar's Hospital
- Brechin
- Elgin Cathedral
- Elgin, Moray
- Hospital chantry
- Hospital of St John the Baptist, Arbroath
- Kincardine O'Neil Hospital, Aberdeenshire
- Mitchell's Hospital Old Aberdeen
- Provand's Lordship - the "physic" garden in Glasgow
- Soutra Aisle
- Trinity College Kirk
