= Kincardine O'Neil Hospital, Aberdeenshire =

Hospital of St Mary; and Hospital of St Erchard
- St Machar's Cathedral
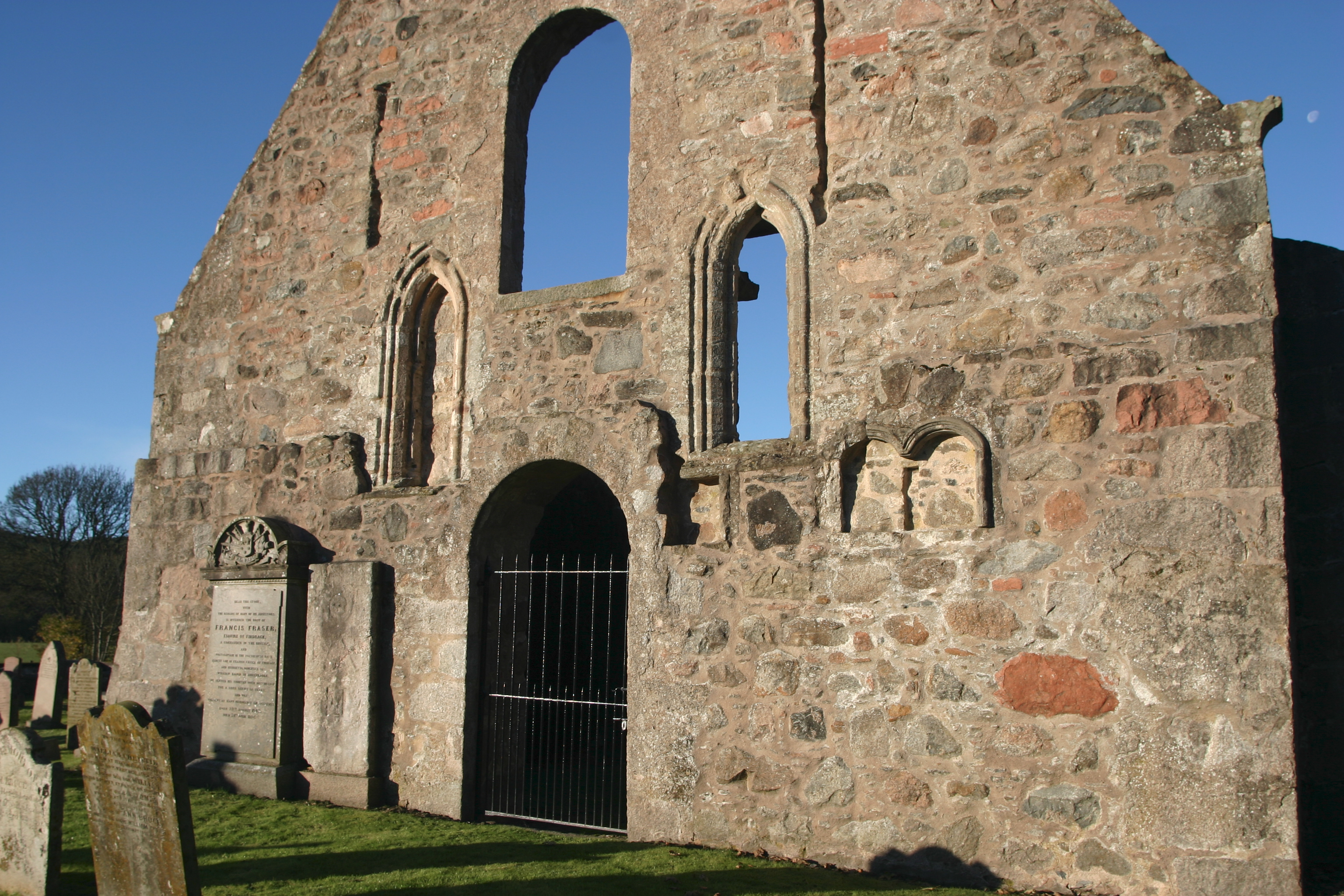
- East end of adjoining Church of St Erchard (ruins) with lancet windows and internal aumbries.

Geography
- Location: Kincardine O'Neil, Aberdeenshire, Scotland
- Coordinates: 57.0859°N 2.6744°W

Organisation
- Care system: Medieval Sub-Monastic care
- Type: Medieval Hospital
- Patron: Probably Bishop Adam de Kald or Bishop Gilbert de Stirling or Alan the Durward, Justiciar of Scotland

History
- Founded: c1225x1230
- Closed: c. Before 1450
- Demolished: Before 1400

Links
- Other links: Hospitals in medieval Scotland

Scheduled monument
- Official name: Kincardine o'Neil
- Type: Ecclesiastical: church
- Designated: 31 March 1936
- Reference no.: SM88

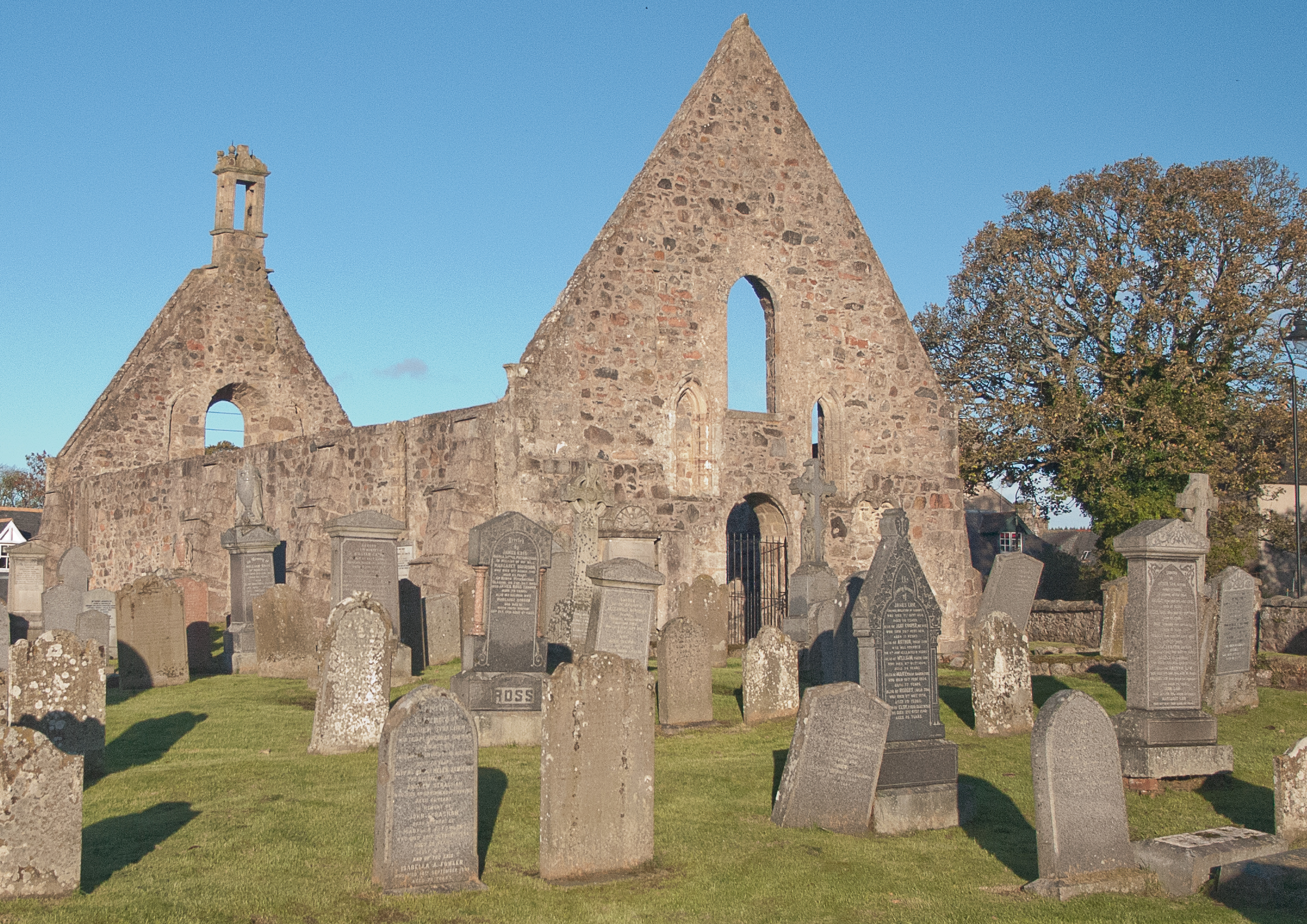
Ruins of St Erchard's Church adjacent to the hospital site in Kincardine O'Neil

Kincardine O'Neil Hospital was founded in the 13th century in the village of Kincardine O'Neil in Scotland. Almost certainly it served as a traveler's inn and as a hospice for elderly and "poor" men. The hospital was situated adjacent to a bridge over the River Dee and may have been a chantry (Note: See chantry for a discussion of the origins of chantries against developments in Catholic theology of Purgatory.) for the early Bishops of Mortlach (See Bishop of Aberdeen). Remains of a building can be seen abutted to the Auld Parish Church in Kincardine O'Neil. (Note: Since this article was first written, conflicting evidence has emerged. McAleese, in two publications brings the evidence up to date (2015). Currently (28/11/15) - interest in the foundations of the ruins and the Auld Kirk raises the possibility that the East wall of the Auld Kirk may have been part of the ruins - NOT, as previously thought, part of the Auld Kirk. The Ruins and the surrounding ground including the Cemetery, are owned by Aberdeenshire Council. Work is being planned to investigate further this possibility. See - Ray McAleese, 'St Mary's Hospital Kincardine O'Neil', Scottish Local History Journal, April (2015), 12-20; and, Ray McAleese, 'The Kincardine O'Neil Hospitals', The Leopard (2015)) This building may have been a later or second hospital. It is also possible that these ruins may have been part of St Erchard's Church - a.k.a. St Marys' or the Auld Kirk.

== History ==
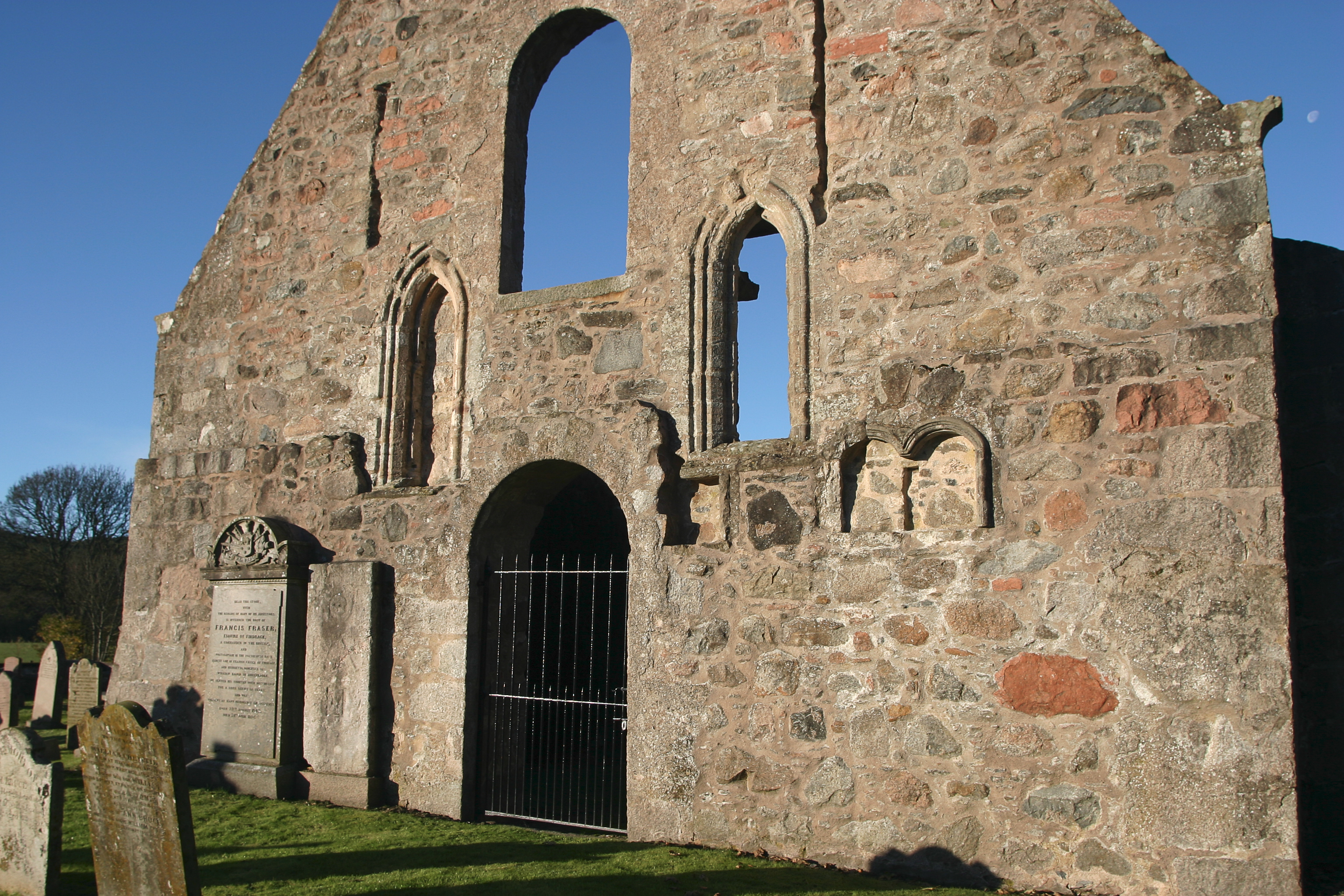
East end of the Church showing the lancet windows. To the right (North) of the right hand window are the remains of an aumbry or wall-press.

There is no certainty with regard to the Hospital or its location. The first reference to a hospital being built comes from the 1233 Charter by Alan the Durward. Confirmatory evidence can be found in 1296 in the Second Ragman Roll. (Note: The Ragman Rolls are lists of the Scottish nobility and religious leaders who signed an oath to be loyal to Edward I (1272-1307), King of England, in 1291 and again in 1296 after the death of Queen Margaret (1286-1291). The name "Ragman" may come from the way the signatories affixed their wax seals to the parchment along with their own ribbon on the wax. It is also possible that the name refers to a specific statute from Edward I - " (The name of) a statute of Edward I of 1276, which provided for the appointment of justices to hear and determine complaints of injuries done during the preceding 25 years (4 Edw. 1)" (OED) See: Bannatyne Club (Edinburgh Scotland), and Thomas Thomson, Instrumenta Publica, Sive Processus Super Fidelitatibus Et Homagiis Scotorum Domino Regi Angliae Factis, A.D. Mccxci-Mccxcvi (Edinburgh,1834), pp. xxii, 183, xlvii p.. A searchable list of the signatories can be found at: http://www.electricscotland.com/history/articles/ragman_rolls.htm (Page Retrieved 5/6/2014.) On 28 August 1296 " …Wautier master of the hospital of Kincardine ou Neel …" signed the Roll at Berwick on Tweed. (Note: I am grateful to Norman Abbot for this source, Personal Communication, 5 May 2014.) Two possible sites have been identified. Most likely, it was founded by Alan or Thomas Durward between 1241 and 1244 abutting St Erchard's Church. (Note: A Charter from Alan the Durward granting the Church of Kincardine O'Neil to the Hospital Exists.) It was later built near St Mary's Church – the "Auld Kirk" in Kincardine O'Neil. In 1330 the hospital and its church was erected into a prebend of Aberdeen Cathedral. It may have stood in a field known locally as "Bladernach" near a 19th-century ferryboat station on the river Dee at NO 5874 9933. There was no local knowledge of Bladernach in June 1972 when visited by the Ordnance Survey. The following description comes from Places of Worship in Scotland:

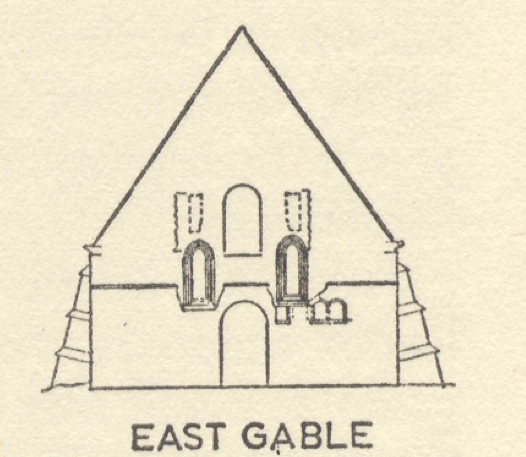
East gable end plan of Church showing internal windows of the hospital and the 3 aumbries. [Based on details in Simpson (1968)]

The church is thought to stand on, or near, the site of the first church established by St Erchard, the patron saint of Kincardine O'Neil, who brought Christianity here in the 5th century. He was taught at nearby Banchory by St Ternan. The church is located near a river (as common in early Christian sites), in this case the River Dee. There was an important river crossing point here, on the main route between Strathmore and Mar. The current church remains are thought to date to the 14th century. It was recorded that the church was built as a gift by Duncan, Earl of Fife. Alexander Kyninmund, Bishop of Aberdeen, rebuilt the church some time in the mid 14th century. A hospital was attached to the east of the church (thought to be in 1330) but was demolished some time before the church itself went out of use, leaving just the foundation stones (There was also an earlier hospital site in Kincardine O'Neil - see other site, 'Kincardine O'Neil Hospital Site'.). The church became ruinous after a new church was built in 1862. The interior was later converted into burial plots. The graveyard surrounding the church has many gravestones, mostly from the 19th century.

== Historical evidence ==
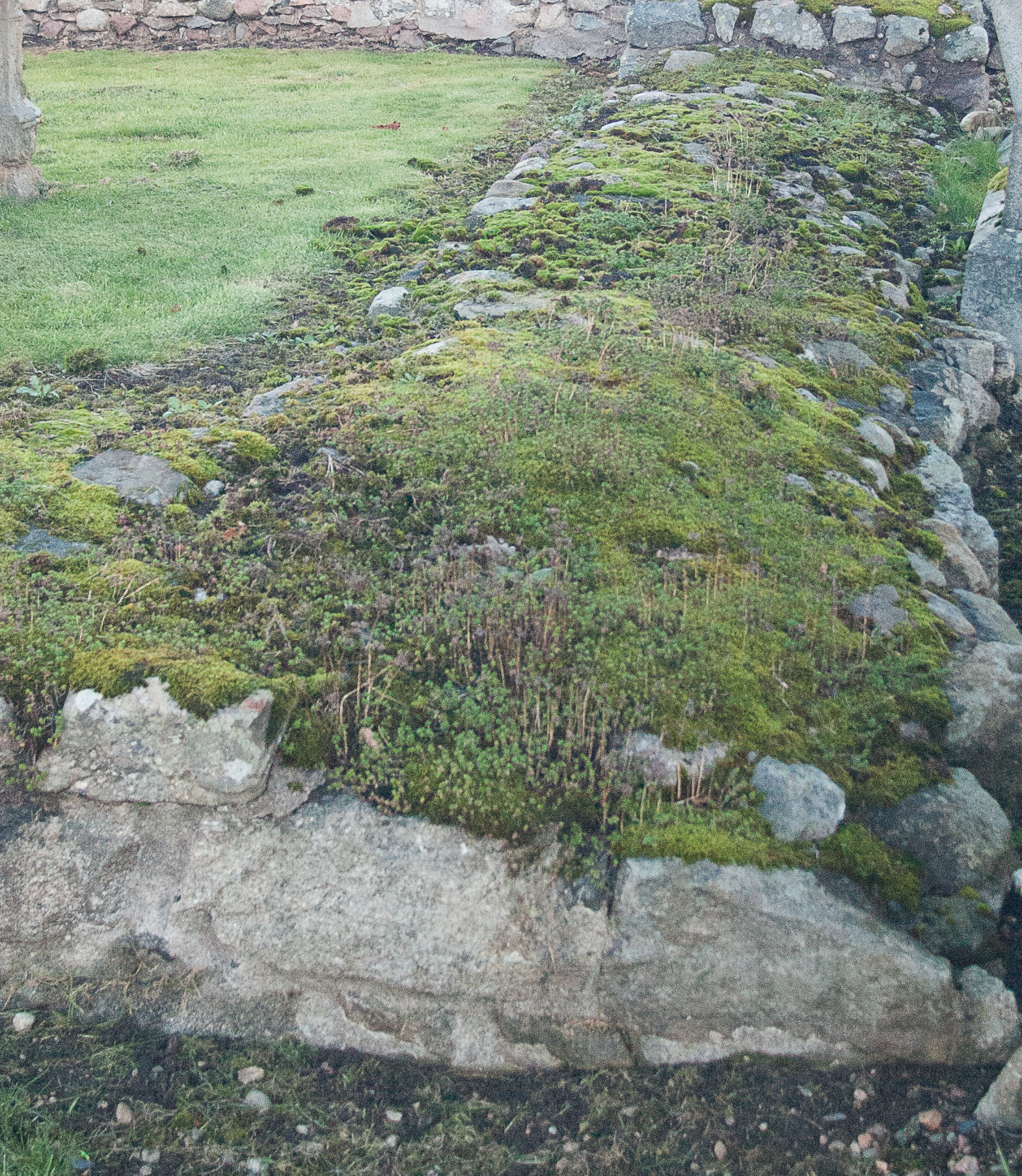
East wall of the ruined hospital in Kincardine O'Neil

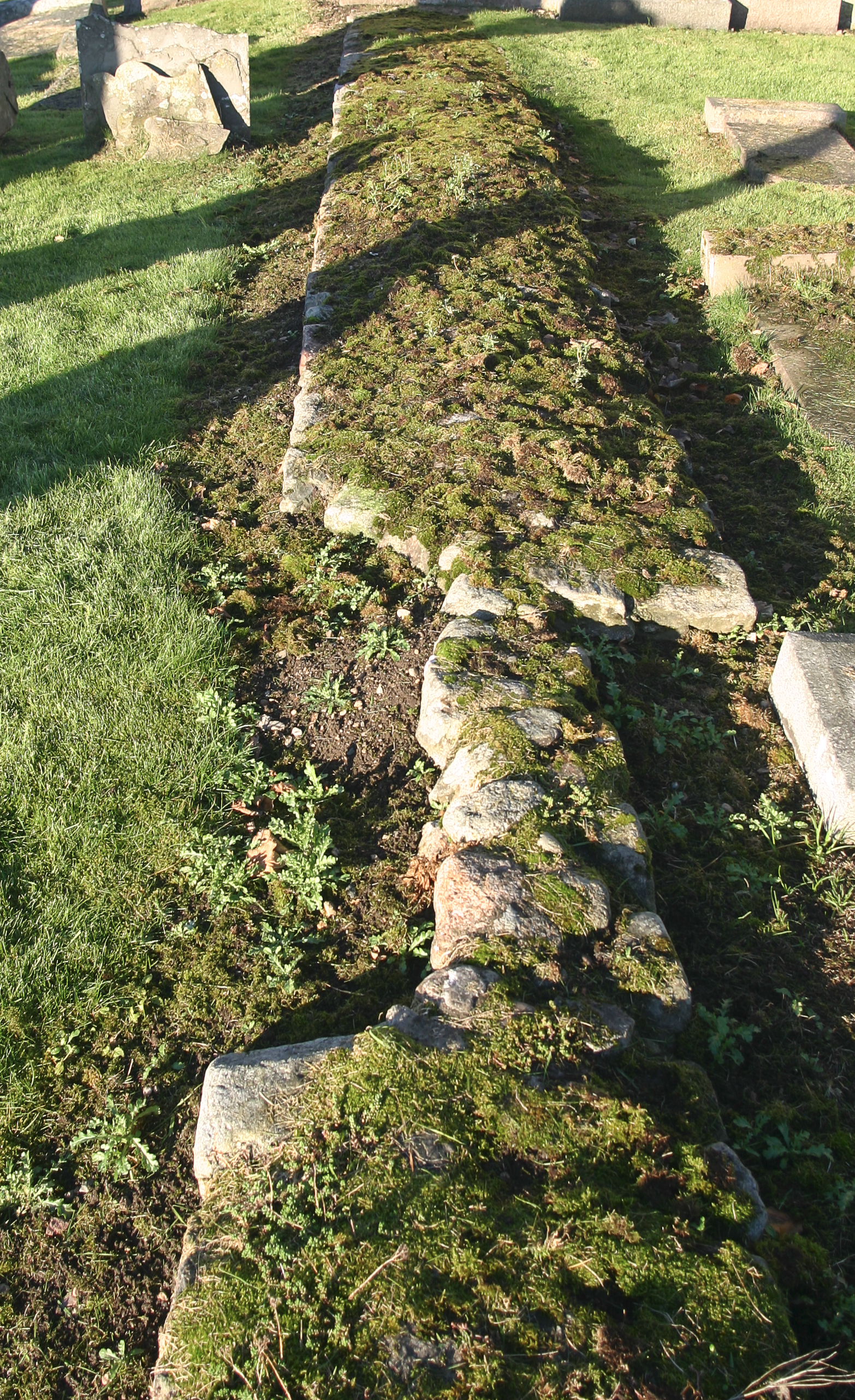
North wall of the ruined hospital in Kincardine O'Neil

The most comprehensive archaeological survey of the Church and the remains of the hospital are found in Douglas Simpson's book. In this he identifies the lancet windows in the east gable as strong evidence for the existence of the abutted building - the hospital. His argument is that the residents of the hospital - both travellers and the sick or needy would be able to hear Mass from the Church through the windows. The windows, when viewed from the outside of the church ruins (the east end) are clearly internal windows. See the photograph alongside. Douglas Simpson writes as follows:

on the outside of the present east gable are three aumbries ... and above this the gable is traversed by a scarcement for a floor. ... on the other side of the inserted windows are the sides of two original windows opening into the church. ... There can be little doubt the eastern ... portion of the building contained the hospital, a two storied annex of which the upper room will have formed the dormitory in which bed-ridden inmates would have herd services … a somewhat similar structural association of hospital and chapel is known in Belgium… or in the Preceptory of the Knights Templar at Torphican in Midlothian. (p170)

The definitive account of medieval hospitals in Scotland by Cowan & Easson concurs with this assessment.

Circumstantial evidence with regard to the location of the hospital being abutted to the church comes from several other medieval hospitals. In England, the monastic infirmary at Christ Church Canterbury; the infirmary at St Mary Chichester; St Bartholomew, Chatam and St James Dulwich are built with an infirmary abutting the respective chapels. The infirmary hall of St Mary Magdalene at Glastonbury also follows this structure.

The 19th-century volume Registrum Episcopatus Aberdonensis provides further evidence.

=== Registrum Episcopatus Aberdonensis ===
Alan Durward is recorded making provision for an existing Hospital, probably founded by his father Thomas de Lundin or Thomas Durward. (Note: Alan "Hostiarius" i.e. "door keeper or usher" is known as "Durward". The family name was " ..of Lundie" The name "hostiarius" coming from his father Thomas who held the honorific post of King's usher or "door ward" from William the Lion (1165-1214). Alan Durward became Justiciar for Scotland. During the minority of Alexander III of Scotland (1249-1286) for a time he was effectively the ruler of Scotland.) The first occasion is in 1233 when he makes a grant of a "davach/davoch" of land called Slutheluthy to support the Hospital. (Note: Davoch is a measure of land roughly equal to 400 Scots acres.) The 1845 transcription into Latin reads:

"….Alanus Hostiarius omnibus amicis et hominibus suis salutem Sciant presentes et futuri me dedisse concessisse et hac presenti carta mea confirmasse Deo et beate Marie et hospitali eiusdem genetricis Dei sito iuxta pontem quem pater meus fecit construi super Dee et fratribus in eodem hospitali Deo seruientibus et seruituris in perpetuum in puram et perpetuam elemosinam ad sustentationem eorundem et pauperum receptionem unam dauacham terre que dictur Sutheluthy per suas rectas diuisas et cum omnibus iustis pertinenciis suis et ecclesiam de Kyncardyn in Marr cum omnibus iustis pertinenciis suis Quare uolo et concedo ut predictum hospitale et fratres in eo seruientes Deo et seruituri in perpetuum predictam ecclesiam et predictam terram habeant tenneant et possideant in puram et perpetuam elemosinam per suas rectas diuisas et cum onmibus iustis pertinenciis suis in terris et aquis in bosco et plano in pratis et pascuis in moris et marresiis in lacubus et piscariis in viis et semitis in feris et auibus in stagnis et molendinis adeo libere quiete plenarie et honorifice sicut aliqua elemosina in regno Scotie liberus quietius plenius honorificentius ab aliqua domo religiosa habetur tenetur et possidetur …"

This charter makes it clear that Thomas Durward. Alan Durward's father, had the hospital built at some time before his death in 1231. The hospital appears to have been run by "brothers" and its function was to shelter the poor – "pauperum receptionem".There is no precise location for the Hospital:

"… me dedisse concessisse et hac presenti carta mea confirmasse Deo et beate Marie et hospitali eiusdem genetricis Dei sito iuxta pontem quem pater meus fecit construi super Dee et fratribus in eodem hospitali Deo seruientibus et seruituris in perpetuum in puram et perpetuam elemosinam ad sustentationem eorundem et pauperum receptionem …"

In summary, this translates to indicate that the gift of land at Sutheluthy is to support the Hospital dedicated to St Mary that is located close to the bridge over the river Dee erected by his father.

A further charter of Alan Durward is dated 1250 announces that he has granted to the brothers of the hospital at Kincardine O'Neil two davachs of land called Sudluyth and Kincardine O'Neil (together with two lands within the davach of Kincardine O'Neil, called Pathkellok and Garslogay). It also mentions that with the consent of Bishop Peter of Aberdeen and the Cathedral chapter the hospital has received a grant of the church of Kincardine O'Neil with all its pertinents, and two acres containing the church of Lumphanan, with the right of patronage and its chapel of Forthery. These grants are apparently made in return for the establishment of a chantry for the salvation of Alan himself, his forebears and heirs. Alan undertakes a forinsec service to the King for these lands, for which the remainder of his land of O'Neil is to answer in perpetuity. He also prescribes brief rules for replacing the brothers and the master of the hospital (leaving it largely to them, but subject to subsequent presentation to himself for his heirs). The document is sealed at Inverurie. A subscription by Alexander, Bishop of Aberdeen, in 1330 on the creation of a cathedral prebend, states that he understands none of the above to have been vitiated or abolished ('non viciatam nec in aliqua sui parte abolitam').

The following year, 1251 there was a papal bull from Innocent IV 'to his beloved sons the master and brothers of the hospital of the poor at Kincardonel'. They have told him about the grants from Alan Durward, with the consent of the Bishop of Aberdeen. He now confirms them with his apostolic authority, which no one is to infringe.

=== Other evidence ===
The paper by Derek Hall includes a comprehensive list of Scottish Hospitals. In the 19th century Andrew Jervise looked for the hospital; he concludes as follows:

no trace remains of the hospital which Alan the Durward founded here, and endowed with considerable property, about 1233. Tradition says that the hospital stood in a field called Bladernach, between the village of Kincardine O'Neil and the present ferryboat station on the Dee. Alan's father erected a stone bridge near the latter place, in connection with the great thoroughfare from the south to the north, by Cairn-o'-Mounth ...(1875)

The Cairn-o'-Mounth is a "Heritage Path" or Drovers' road. (Note: see also Causey Mounth.)

== Evidence from the Royal Commission on the Ancient and Historical Monuments of Scotland ==
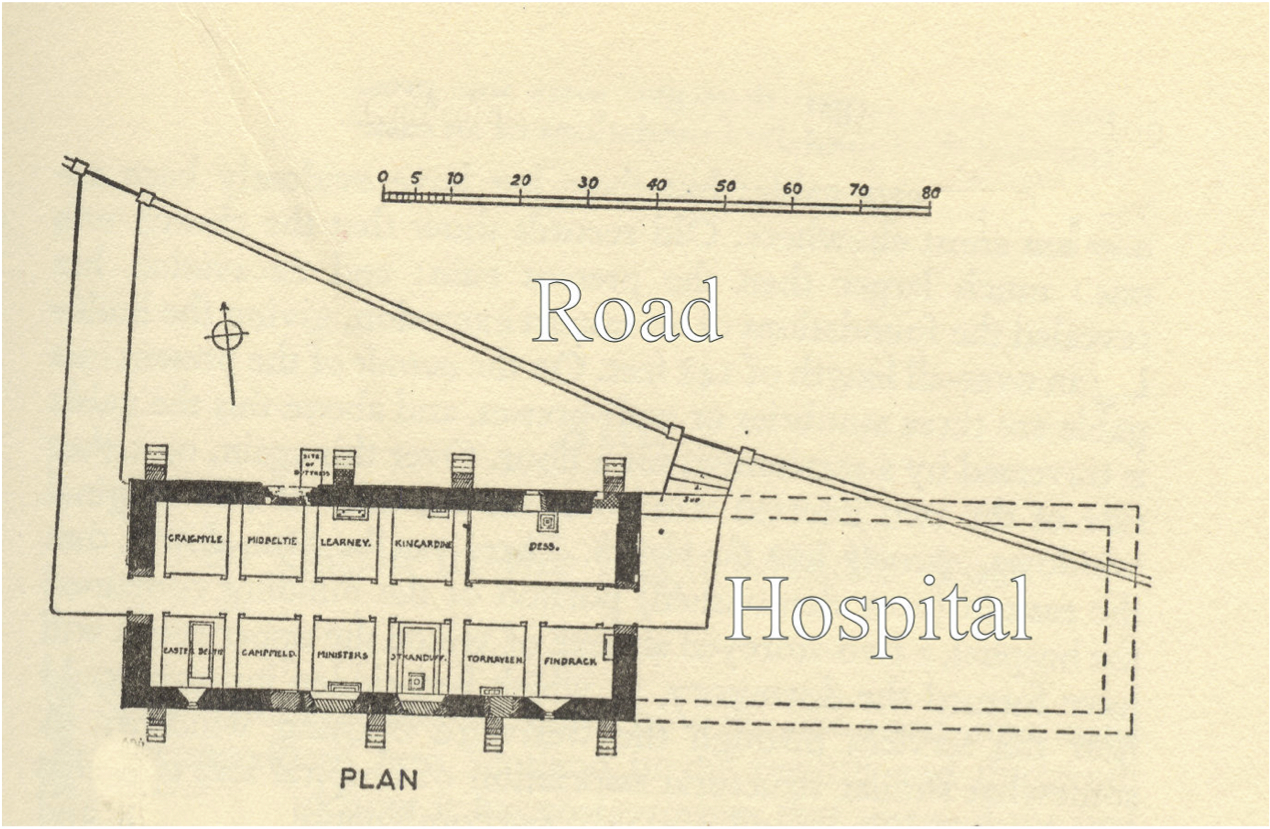
Site plan of church ruins and the hospital. [Based on details in Simpson (1968)]

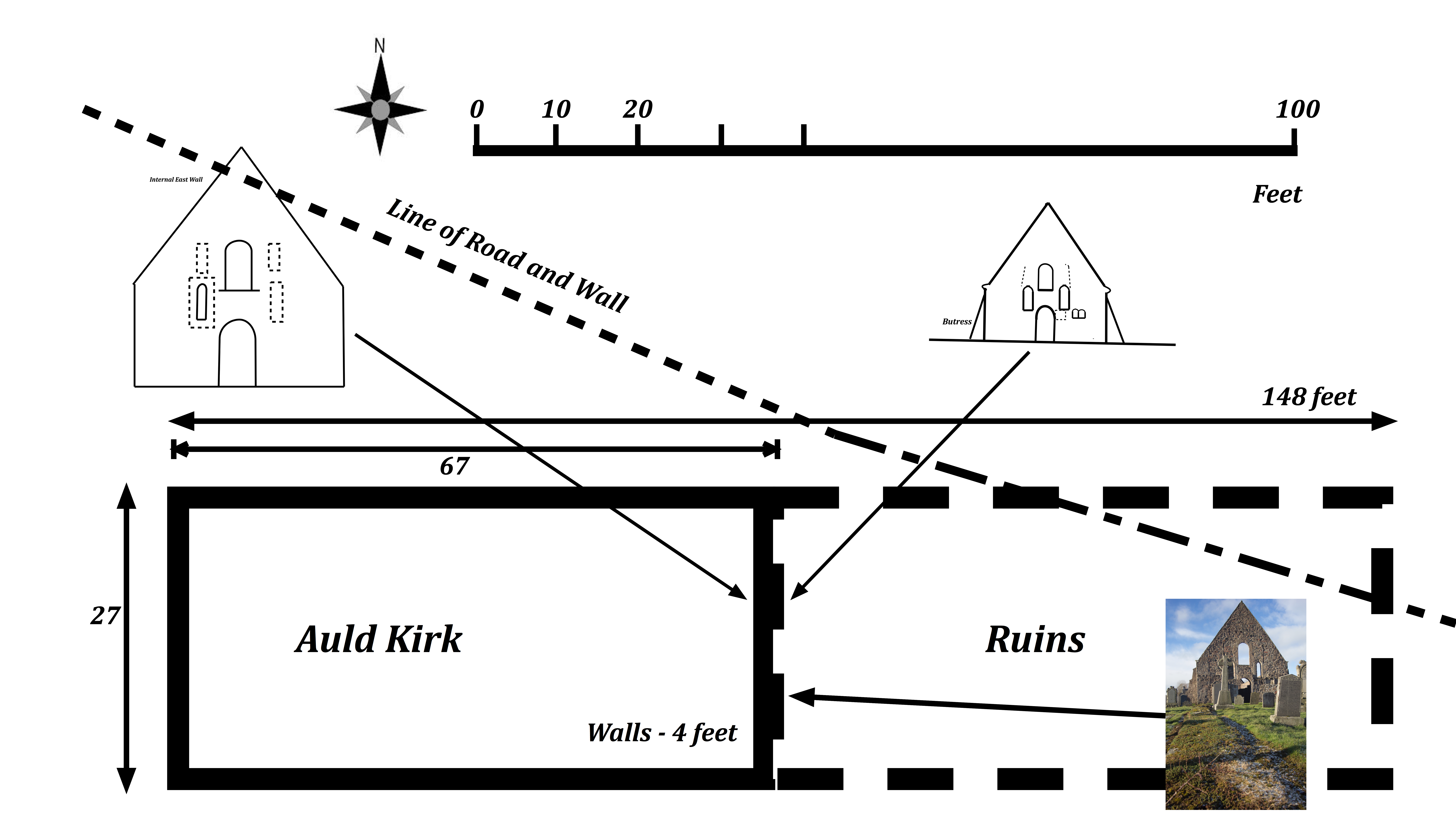
Plan of Auld Kirk in Kincardine O'Neil with ruins to East

RCAHMS provides a summary of the architectural evidence on the history of the hospital. Across a number of documents they report:

The remains of the former parish church dedicated to St Erchard and the Virgin Mary, which appears from documentary evidence to have been a minster in origin. St Erchard is said to have been a local disciple of St Ternan and to be buried in the church. The ruin, of small stones and run lime was repaired and stripped of ivy etc in 1931 to reveal possible 14th century detail including a fine walled-up north door and lancet windows. The granite belfry probably dates from about 1640. The date of foundation of the church is not known but it passed into the possession of the hospital in its foundation before 1231. Foundations which extend 22 meters east of the east gable and architectural peculiarities of the gable itself suggest that the hospital may have adjoined the church on the east. Two windows in the upper part of the gable look into the church as if from an upper floor of the adjoining building as occurred in some monastic buildings in order that sick persons might hear the service. In this case the lancet windows in the east gable would be later insertions, probably dating from the period when the adjoining building was removed. They may in fact have belonged to that building. The church was in use until 1861 when a new church was built. The roof was removed in 1862 and in 1869 the interior was divided into private burial grounds for the ministers and certain of the heritors. Granted with all its pertinents to the hospital of Kincardine O'Neil by its founder, Alan Durward, before 1231, this grant was confirmed in 1250. Along with this church apparently passed its four pendicles of Glentanar, Lumphanan, Cluny and Midmar. The last two of these may, however, have been granted to the hospital independently and were served by vicars in 1274, the hospital master then being taxed 'pro omnibus eclesiis'. In 1330 the hospital with its annexed chapels was erected with the consent of Duncan, earl of Fife, into a prebend of Aberdeen cathedral by Bishop Alexander de Kyninmund. The residual fruits of this prebend with its four annexed chapels were appropriated in 1501 to the Chapel Royal at Stirling, provision being made for vicar pensioners, but it is doubtful whether this was effective. The prebend itself remained with a canon of Aberdeen cathedral, who possessed the parsonage and vicarage teinds of all four pendicles, but only the parsonage teinds of the mother church, the cure being served by a perpetual vicar. The church measures 20.6m by 8.3m with walls 1.0m to 1.3m thick. The foundations on the east side are clearly visible, just protruding through the turf and denote a building of similar dimensions to the church. The North-East corner of the foundations are destroyed.

== The hospital today ==
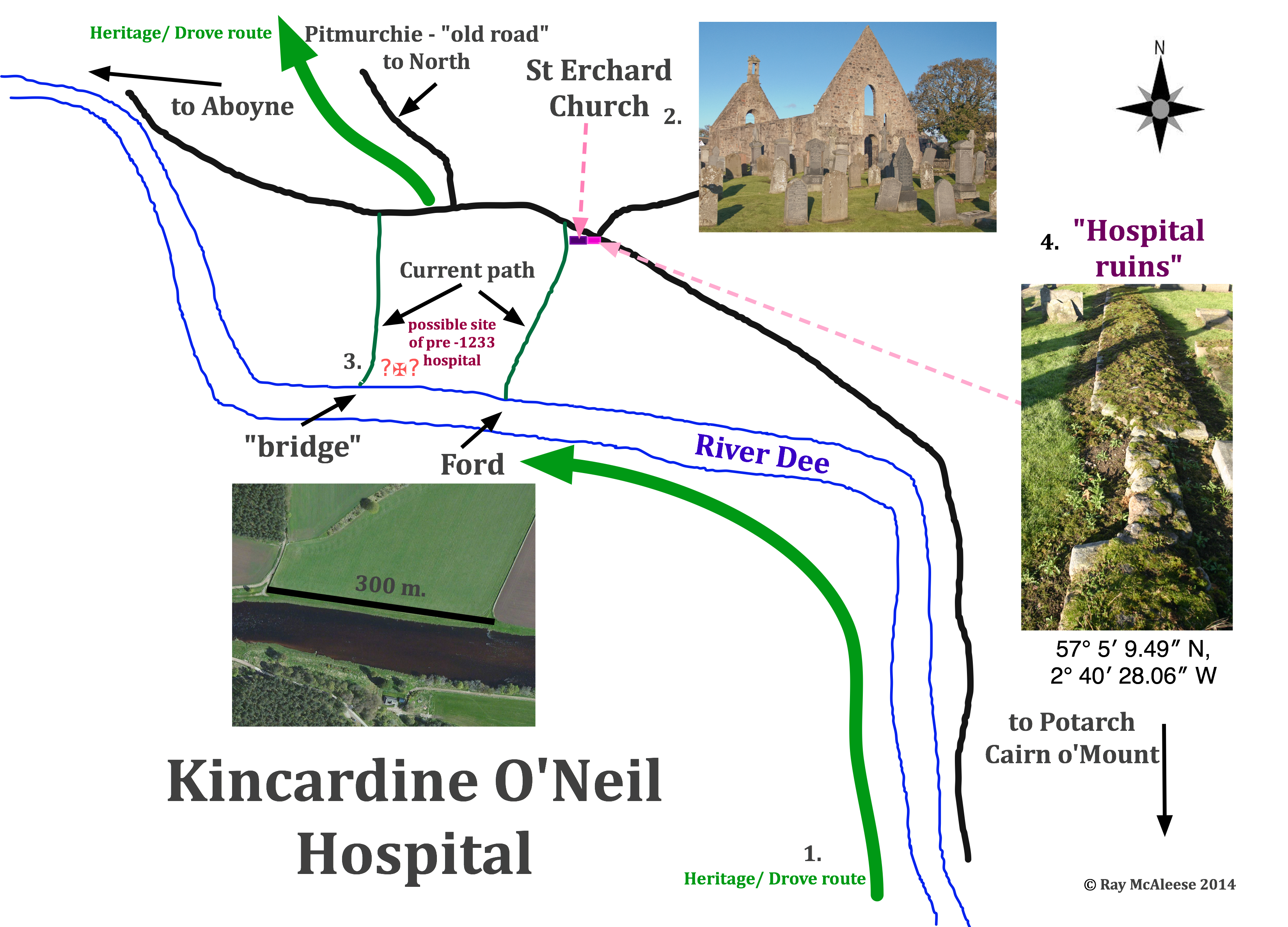
Sketch plan of the Hospital's location in Kincardine O'Neil and the possible site of an earlier "hospital". This map summarises the locations of the "possible" hospital remains abutted to Auld Kirk / St Mary's / St Erchard's Church and indicates the most likely site for a previous hospital that Alan the Durward refers to in the 1233 Charter. 1. Route of Drove or Heritage route from the south over Cairn O'Mount through Kincardine O'Neil to the north. 2. The church of St Erchard or St Mary. St Erchard may have built a church here c. 5th century. 3. The possible location of a "hospital" adjacent to a bridge over the River De built by Thomas de Lundin ( Durward) c1225/ 1230. 4. The visible ruins of what appears to be a hospital abutted to the "old" church.

Taken together with the other sources above, this Hospital must be seen as a significant medieval establishment. It served a number purposes; especially the provision of a sub-monastic care home for locals. There is no clear evidence about the inclusion of women. The location of the hospital adjacent to a river crossing on the drove road indicates that it was a travellers inn. The hospital at Soutra Aisle in the Scottish Borders served a similar purpose. In addition to being a Traveller's Inn, it may have been a Chantry for the Cathedral in Old Aberdeen.

== See also ==
- Bishop Dunbar's Hospital
- Beggar's badge
- Soutra Aisle
- Bede House, Old Aberdeen
- Hospitals in medieval Scotland
- Hospital chantry
- Mitchell's Hospital Old Aberdeen
- Hospital of St John the Baptist, Arbroath
- St. Lesmo of Glen Tanar
