= Kinord Castle =

Ruined castle in Scotland

Location
- Location in Aberdeenshire
- Coordinates: 57.0841°N 2.9252°W

Site history
- Built: 14th century
- Demolished: 1648

Kinord Castle, also known as Loch Kinord Castle, was a 14th-century castle on Castle Island in Loch Kinord to the south of Old Kinord, Aberdeenshire, Scotland.

== History ==
First mentioned in 1335, when supporters of David de Strathbogie sought refuge after the battle of Culblean. The castle is mentioned further in 1505 and was used by the Alexander Gordon, Earl of Huntly as a mansion in 1511. Restored and garrisoned in 1646, the castle was razed by an act of Parliament in 1648.

Slight traces of the castle are visible above ground.
