= Aberdeen charitable trusts =

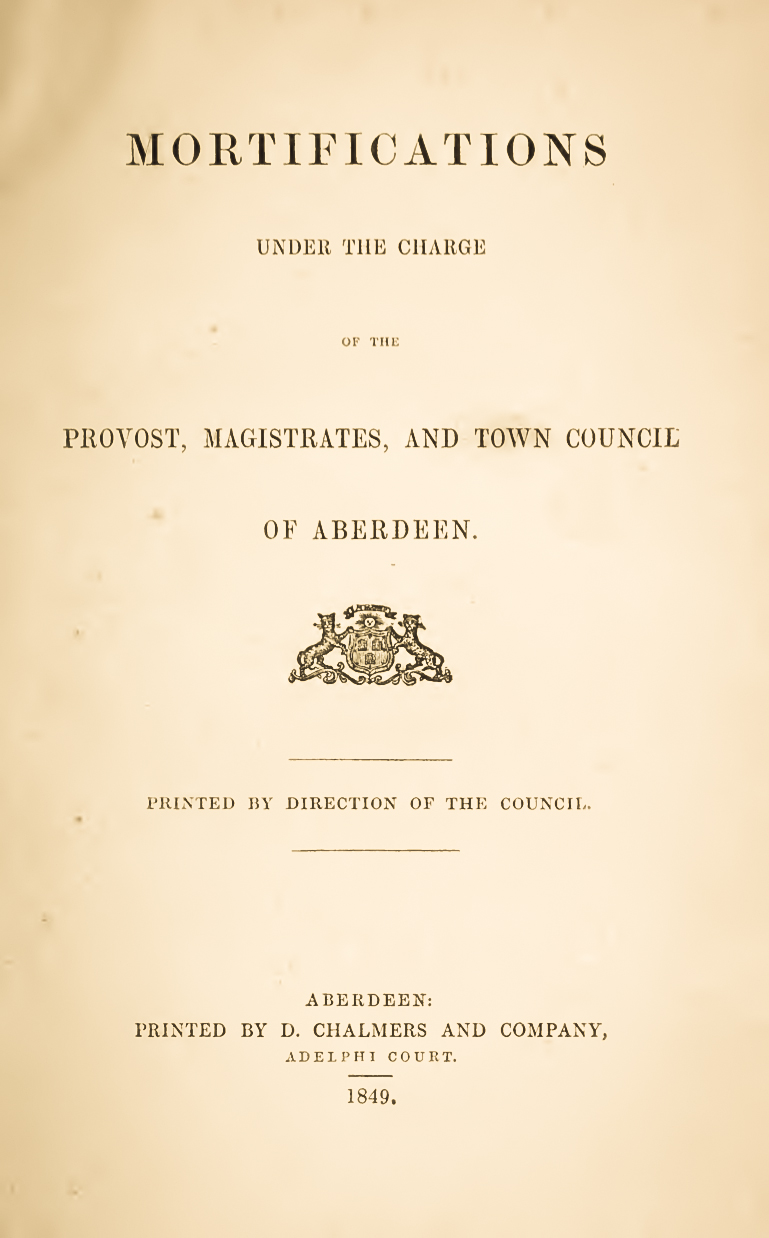
Title page of "Mortifications Under the Charge of ... Aberdeen", 1849, Chalmers & Co. containing details of mortifications held and values in 1849.

Across the United Kingdom, many services such as hospitals and schools depend on private or corporate donation. In the sixteenth century,(before 1560 in Scotland) the Church and the nobility were the only source of such support. By the nineteenth century, government and local authorities had taken over this responsibility. Poor Laws in the nineteenth century provided a more secure form of help for the poor and gradually the use of mortifications declined. Sometimes a hospital, Bedehouse, or care home was given money directly to further its purposes. The City of Aberdeen like many across Scotland, and in the rest of the United Kingdom, administers charitable trusts to benefit its residents (approximately £8m in 2013). Some of these date back to the fourteenth and fifteenth centuries. In general these mortifications were endowed to benefit Guildry members, the poor, medical, educational, cultural, arts and heritage purposes individuals and groups. Recently the City Council has re-organised these charities together with OSCR. Some of the charities have been wound up with residual funds allocated to other charities with similar purposes in Aberdeen.

== Mortifications for the poor ==
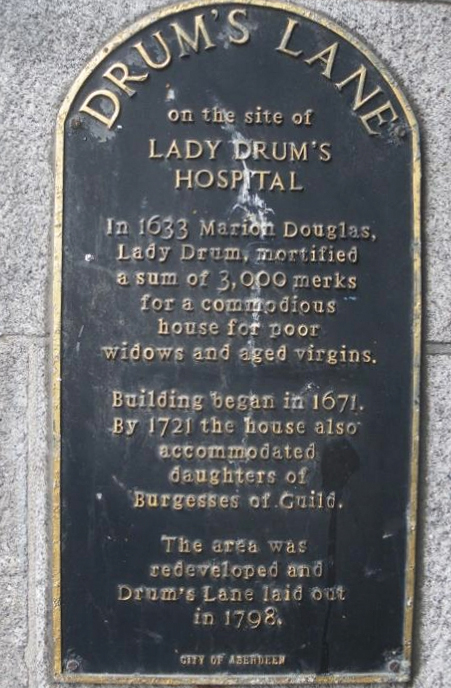
Plaque commemorating the location of the Lady Drum's Hospital in Aberdeen. Drum's Lane is off Upper Kirkgate, near Marischal College.

The city of "new" or Royal Aberdeen has been in receipt of many bequests from individuals and organizations. Some of these were intended to alleviate the poverty of widows, guild or Trades and craft members. The bequest by Marione Douglas, Lady Drum in 1633 was supplemented by a number of other benefactors. Lady Drum gave 3000 Scots Merks

"... to Widows of that have beine the wyffes of burgesses of Aberdeine, and who have leived, both in ther widowheide, and in the tyme of ther life and mariage and cohabitatione with ther hushands, .... of good lyfe and conversation, frie of anie publict scandle, or offence, ...."

A hospital or house was commissioned to provide a lodging for the ladies. It was known as Lady Drum's Hospital. In 1634, Jean Goold or Guild mortified 50 Merks Scots (In 1849, this sum was worth some £26 15s 6d). to assist "poor widows and virgins". Jean Guild was the "relick" or widow of a David Anderson(e) of Finzean, a burghess of Aberdeen. The text of the document indicates the strict standards to be met when allocating the funds.

" ... be it kend till all men, be thir present letters, Me Jeane Goold, relict of umquhile David Andersone of finzeauch, burges of Aberdeine, to the honor of Almightie God, to have frielie given and mortified to the provost Baillies Councell and Communitie of the said brugh of Aberdeine, and to ther Successors, in all tyme enmeing, for the use underwreittin, the Soume of fyve hundreth nierkes, usuall money of Scotland, to be bestowed and employed upone anuel rent where most convenient employment can be hade be advyse of the Provest Baillies and Councell of the said brugh, for the tyme, and the yeirlie anuel rent therof, I ordayne to be given and bestowed, be the master of the mortified moneyes of the said brugh, for the tyme, to Bessie Leask, .... and Beatrix Mollysone, and efter both ther deceiss, I appoynt and ordayne the anuel rent of the said fyve hundreth markes to be given and bestowed, from then furth, towards the helpe and maintenance of poore vidowes and virgines, within the said brugh of Aberdeine, of the qualitie efter specified, viz : to widowes that lies beine the wyiffes of burgesses of Aberdeine, merchands, or craftsmen, livand, both in the tyme of ther widowheide, and in the tyme of ther mariage and cohabitatione with ther husbandes, of good lyfe and conversatione, frie of anie publict Scandell or offence, and to aiged virgines who are borne bairnes in Aberdeine, and who have lived in the state of virginitie, and continowes in that estate .. to ther lyves end, frie of publict Scandell, as said is .. and if anie of the saids widowes or virgines, that sail happen to be admitted, sail prove scandelous, efter ther admissione therunto, I ordayne them to be simpliciter discharged therof, upon just tryall and notice taken of ther scandelous carriage, be the Provest Baillies and Councell of the said brngh, whome I appoynt to be judges for trying of the said Scandell or miscarriage ...."

Additional bequests were made to the initial money by Lady Drum by several benefactors until the end of the seventeen hundreds (Alexander Galloway £226 13s 4d (Scots) 17 February 1700; Mrs Agnes Durie (Divvie?) 1000 Merks Scots (£55 11s 1d); Jean Cattanach £200 0s 0d and Miss Bell Cattanach of £100 (Sterling)). The 1633 mortification by Lady Drum led to the building of a hospital in 1671. In 1721, maiden daughters of Burgesses of Guild were also admitted. This house was demolished in 1798. The City of Aberdeen has a plaque adjacent to the spot where the "hospital" was located on Upper Kirkgate.

== The present ==
The Aberdeen City Council has decided to wind up a number of these charities that have insufficient funds to operate efficiently. An interesting example relates to the house or hospital founded by Lady Drum in 1633. After discussions with OSCR the residual funds from the Lady Drum Hospital have been allocated to another local charity, the Instant Neighbour scheme. OSCR have decided that historic charities should be amalgamated to maximize potential income to beneficiaries. OSCR's functions in Scotland, amongst others are to: Keep a public Register of charities; Encourage, facilitate and monitor compliance by charities with the provisions of the Charities and Trustee Investment (Scotland) Act 2005. In general, the future of many "historic" charities or trusts is in doubt. Many Pre-reformation hospital charities or trusts have been wound up in recent years due to the absence of beneficiaries and diminishing income from mortification and the old "Feu" system. Feuing was in practice abolished in Scotland in 2000. An example was the Bishop Gavin Dunbar's Hospital, SC003765 which no longer operates.

== See also ==
- Aberdeen poorhouses
- Aberdeen trades hospitals
- Bishop Dunbar's Hospital
- Cowane's Hospital
- Hospital chantry
- Kincardine O'Neil Hospital, Aberdeenshire
- Hospitals in medieval Scotland
- Mitchell's Hospital Old Aberdeen
- Scottish Bedesmen
