= Aberdeen trades hospitals =

Scottish hospitals built by merchants

Coordinates: 57.146649°N 2.0991392°W

Several Aberdeen trades hospitals were built by the merchants and trades associations of Aberdeen ("New" and Old Aberdeen) in Scotland from the sixteenth to the nineteenth century. Traditionally hospitals had been built by the church.

In addition to hospitals that served the needs of the poor and elderly, "hospitals" were built as schools. Robert Gordon's College was founded by a wealthy merchant in 1731. In "Royal" Aberdeen and Old Aberdeen the incorporated trades formed associations to serve the needs of the craftsmen. Similar incorporated trades associations are to be found in Elgin, Edinburgh, Irvine, Stirling, Dundee, Kirkcubright and Glasgow.

In addition to such hospitals, there were "correction houses" and workhouses or poorhouses.

== Pre-Reformation hospitals ==
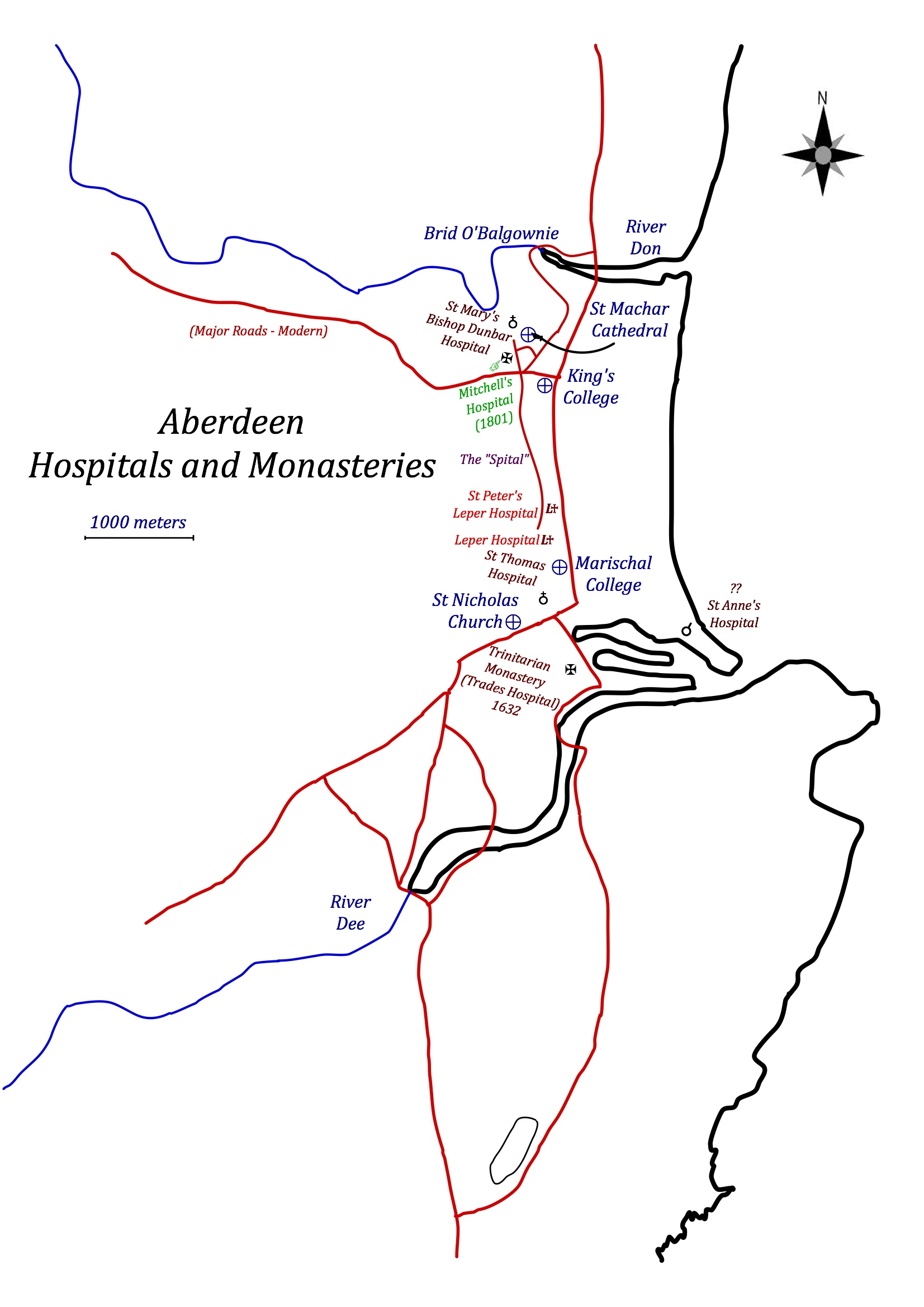
Aberdeen monasteries and hospitals

From the early twelfth century, hospitals had been built by church foundations across Europe to meet the needs of the poor and elderly (see Hospitals in medieval Scotland for more details on medieval hospitals). In general the church applied a doctrine of charity in which the elderly, infirm and those suffering from diseases such as leprosy were cared for in hospitals. Few Pre-Reformation hospitals provide what is now called "health care". The general concern in Pre-Reformation times was for "spiritual health"; in Post-Reformation times the concern was for "physical health". Some hospitals did have physic gardens. The growth of incorporated trades organizations and merchant societies offered an alternative of community care for members and their "relicks". Church hospitals founded before 1559/1560 were: Aberdeen Leper House, St Anne c1363 to 1573; St Peters c 1179 to 1427; St Thomas the Martyr 1459 to uncertain; St Mary's Old Aberdeen 1531 to 2013.

== Post-Reformation developments ==
=== Trinitarian Monastery ===
A Trinitarian Monastery and Hospital had been founded in Aberdeen in 1181 - possibly 1211. The location was west of Market Street and on the north side of Guild Street. At the time of the Reformation the buildings were attacked and destroyed. William Guild bought the lands and buildings in 1632 for the Incorporated Trades in order to create a new Hospital. (See below) The location was probably at NJ 9427 0607.

=== Hospital of St Thomas the Martyr ===
The Hospital of St Thomas the Martyr was founded in 1459 by "Master" or Canon John Clatt for the reception of the poor and infirm. The residents have were referred to as "Bedesmen". The site is probably to the north of Union Street in Aberdeen, adjacent to Correction Wynd(NJ 94100 06200). In a document dates 28 May 1459, the foundation is recorded thus:

“...Mr. John Clatt, canon of the Churches of Aberdeen and Brechin ... did ... for the reception of the poor and infirm who shall come into the said hospital. Of which hospital, and the lands and possessions assigned, or to be assigned, and also of the poor and infirm persons dwelling in it after its construction, he created and ordained Sir John Chawmer to be Master and Rector, and gave to him the chaplaincy of the same; he assigned the patronage of the chaplaincy of the said hospital, after his own decease and that of the said Sir John, to the Provost for ever ...”

The hospital appears to have worked in a satisfactory manner; although little more is known of its creation or the nature life for the residents. It is known that the Bedesmen entered the Hospital: ".. separate from the world of all worldly employments and relations ...(professing) to betack themselves to Godlivership ..." They were distinguished by a russet gown and an identifying badge. They received new clothes annually and were banned from asking for alms outwith the Hospital. Almost certainly they lived a sub-monastic life – similar to the Bedesmen who lived in Bishop Dunbar's Hospital in Old Aberdeen. A reference to their life in the archives of Aberdeen Council records that they spent: "... their days in prayer, reading mortification conference and other suchlike Christian exercises.." What is also known is that tensions grew between the Merchants and the Craftsmen or Tradesmen over entry to the Hospital. In practice the Merchants monopolized the use of the Hospital. This came to a head in 1609 (1 March) when the Aberdeen Council enacted a clear discrimination in favour of Merchants. The Aberdeen Council Records notes the decision as follows:

.. The said day the provost, baillies, new and old counsell, considering that divers persons his been admitted and received to the hospital of this burght in times bygone wha hes not been Burgess of gild, express against the terms of the foundation of the hospital, be the whilk it is specially provided that none sail be admitted thereto except decayed brither of gild of this burght allenarlie. Therefore to avoid the said abuse hereafter, and in respect that the rent of the said hospital is given and mortified thereto be the brither of gild of this burght, and be nane others, they enact and ordain that nane sail be admittet nor received to the said hospital in time coming unless that they be burgesses of gild of this burght according to the tenor of the foundation thereof, excluding hereby all craftsmen of this burght, extranears or utheris whomsoever from having any place in the said hospital ... unless the foundation thereof be altered, and that livings be deited and mortifiet thereto be craftsmen...” Council Register, vol. xliii, p. 884.

It is believed that Dr William Guild came to found what became known as The Trades Hospital in 1632/3 as a result of this decision.

=== William Guild Mortification and the Trades Hospital ===
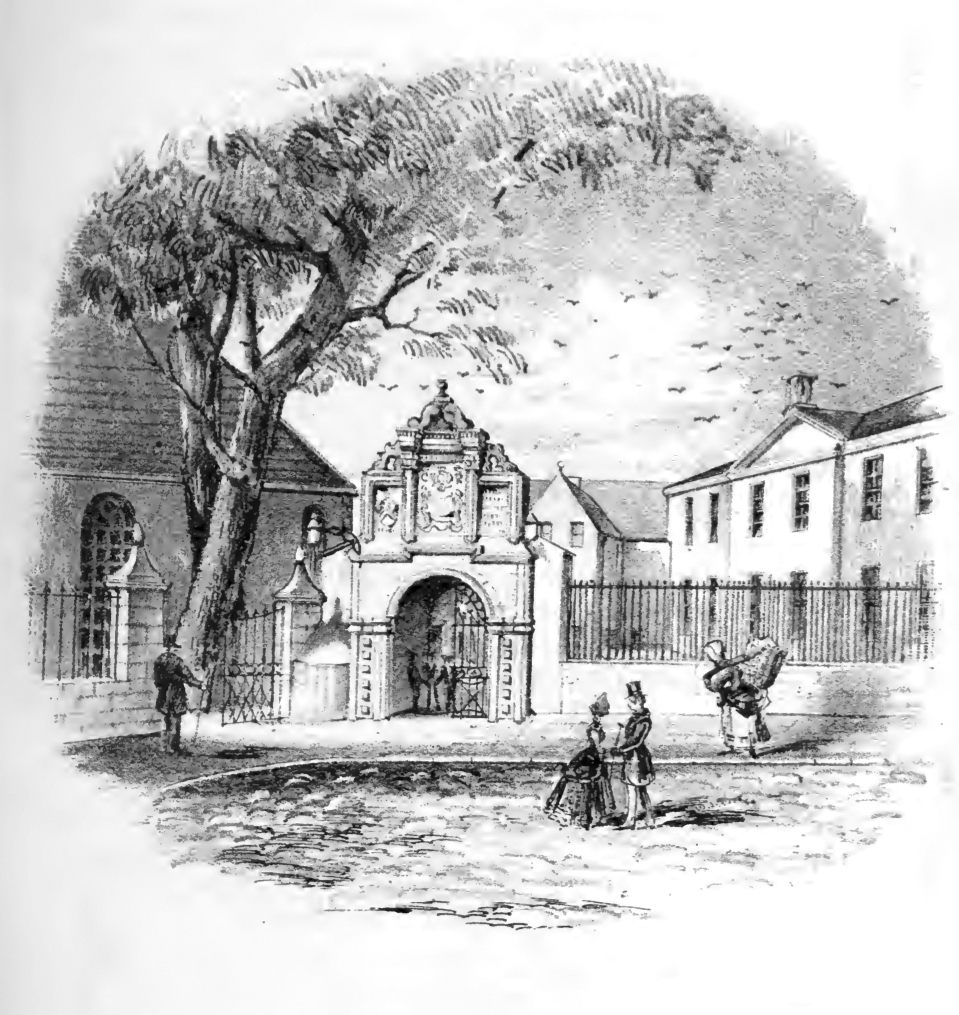
The Trades Hospital Aberdeen, c1830 at Trinity Corner. Behind the Dr. Guild Gateway are Trinity Hall and the Trades Hospital (to the right).

In 1632/3, Dr. William Guild (1586–1657), endowed Trades Hospital in a Mortification and received confirmation from King Charles I dated 24 June 1633. Guild, the son of Matthew Guild a wealthy armourer, was a complex character. He was generous to the Incorporated Trades and gifted part of the land and buildings of the Trinity Monastery (See above) as a Meeting House and Hospital. The benefits were applied to the Hammer men; the Bakers; the Wrights and Coopers; the Shoemakers and the Tailors. The residents were to be "decayed craftsmen". They would be known as "Beidmen". Guild was very specific about the way the "Beidsmen" were to behave. The following sections from the Confirmation indicate the strict Reformed Protestant and Christian values that Guild himself maintained and required from the residents.

I WILL also, that they be always present at the Sunday and weekly sermons (unless they be confined to their beds by sickness), as also at the public morning and evening prayers (especially in summer)...

ALSO, I ordain that in their own chapel a portion of the Word of God be read twice daily, and prayers offered up by a suitable reader (who shall have fifty merks paid him therefore yearly), to be properly chosen by the patron, which service shall be between nine and ten in the morning or forenoon, and between three and four in the evening or afternoon and whoever (except through sickness) shall be once absent, let him be admonished; if twice, punished by the director; and if thrice, removed from the hospital...

I WILL also, that no woman dwell in the said hospital (although the wife of one that is admitted), or stay therein for a moment; and that no one who is admitted wander in any way forth thereof through the town or streets; and that they all be always clothed with gowns of a single and decent colour; MOREOVER, that the said beadmen be subject and obedient to the commands and admonitions of the foresaid director, and that they be an honest, godly, and peaceable conversation. And if any of them wander without, or be troublesome within to any of their comrades, or commit any other fault, or be found disobedient, or a breaker of the rules of this mortification, he shall be punished in his person, or removed from the hospital, by the said director, who, however, in this case shall take the advice and consent of the foresaid minister of the Word of God and deacon convener, who have, and by these presents shall have power, one poor man dying or removing from the said hospital or being otherwise withdrawn, to choose and put in another poor man in his place, in form aforesaid. ...

I WILL also, that one of the foresaid poor men be janitor of the said hospital weekly, having the keys of the doors and gates thereof (except the keys of the private rooms); and keep this order First, in the morning, he shall open the outer gate and the door of the house and chapel at half past seven hours, that they may go to public prayers in the church, or to hear a discourse, and at that same hour shall ring the bell a little, that by ringing thereof the rest being awakened may make themselves ready for the foresaid exercises: Next, the same janitor shall ring the bell regularly about the ninth hour in the morning, and the third hour in the evening, to summon the rest to hear prayers and the reading of the Scriptures in the chapel : And from thence they are to go to their own private rooms, and use their trade till the eleventh hour in the forenoon, and the sixth, in the evening, and then they shall assemble in the common hall, and under a common president dine and sup together, the hebdomadar always publicly giving thanks...

From the beginning, a Master of Hospital was appointed. This position effectively controlled the Hospital, its "Bedesmen", their conditions of life and the offers of places to the Incorporated Trades members. The first Master of Hospital was Thomas Gardine, a tailor, was appointed in 1632. The Incorporated Trades record the nature of the first master as follows:

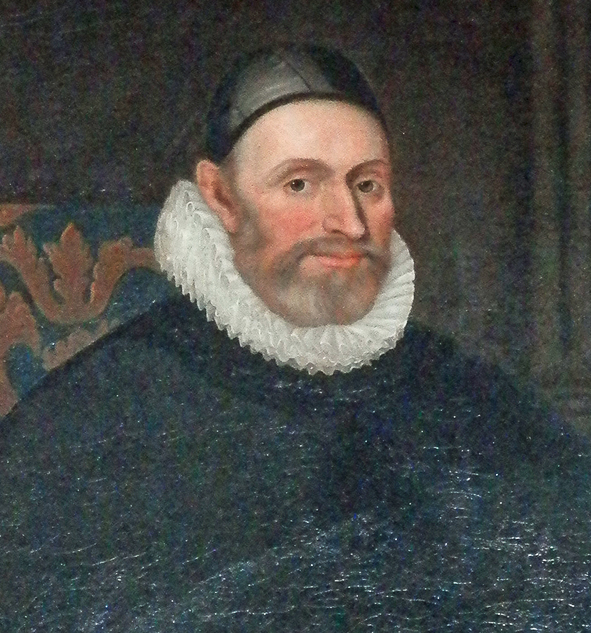
William Guild - Founder and Patron (1633) of the Aberdeen Trades Hospital - selection from a portrait held by the Seven Incorporated Guilds, Aberdeen

... a faithful, Christian, honest man, one of the said traids, shall be chosen yearlie by advice of the patron and his successors, as patrons, with consent of the members of the Deacon Conveener Court, to collect the whole rents and casualties belonging thereto,...

In addition the Hospital had a Patron, a Housekeeper and eventually a Catechist. Guild was the first Patron, serving from 1633 to 1657. The Catechist was to:

...to instruct ( the residents) in the points of faith, professed in this National Church, and necessary to salvation. Salary... 50 merks Scots, during his continuance in said office and good behaviour..

In the course of time, the "Bedesmen" rebelled against the strict regime imposed by Guild. By the late seventeen hundreds, the hospital could not be sustained by the Incorporated Trades and eventually a "Decreet of Declarator" was sought from the Court of Session in Edinburgh to allow the "Beidesmen" to be supported with stipends in the community. This application for judicial review also dealt with the use of Mortifications to the Hospital from John Turner of Danzig and Dr. Partrick Sibbald. The appellants claimed:

...it is not only inexpedient, but in so far as no person will accept of the foresaid Charitable Institutions on the conditions specified in the original Deeds of Mortification, It is impracticable literally to follow all the rules and regulations therein laid down...

The Court of Session agreed on 10 March 1803. The result was that the Hospital was used less and less as a residential hospice. The practical outcome was that a stipend was paid to retiring members on 15 May and 11 November of each year. The members lived "in the community". While care for the poor was still an important civic issue, the use of residential Hospitals went out of favour.

When the Hospital ceased to operate as a Care Home for residents, the meeting house Trinity Hall, continued to serve the Incorporated Trades as their headquarters. However, towards the middle of the nineteenth century (c1844) "Trinity Ha" - as it was known – gave way to the railway which eventually came to Aberdeen (c1850). The Incorporated Trades moved Trinity Hall to Union Street (NJ 94013 06113) and then in 1965 to its current site at the end of Great Western Road Aberdeen. (NJ 93195 05445)

The Incorporated Trades of Aberdeen still look after the aged and "decayed" craftsmen by paying annuities to retired members, together with widows and family. The Seven Incorporated Trades in Aberdeen is a significant organization in the City of Aberdeen. Its purpose is, apart from its continuing links with the old 1623 Hospital, to carry out charitable and educational work – concentrating on the crafts and trades.

=== Lady Drum Hospital ===
As a result of the Guild Mortification, the dowager Lady Drum mortified £2000 to establish a hospital for guild widows and spinsters in 1664. Dennison et al. suggest that " ".. (this initiative) .. helped to fill a void in female society in Aberdeen, which lacked any institutional focus since the nunneries closed..." The terms of the legacy, dated 26 May 1633, were explicit. The income from rents from land and property etc were to support:

...widows of that have beine the wyffes of burgesses of Aberdeine, and who Burgesses of have leived, both in ther widowheide, and in the tyme of ther mariage and cohabitatione with ther hushands, of good lyfe and conversation, frie of anie publict scandle, or offence, and aged virgines, who are borne bairnes in Aberdeine, and aged virgins ... who have leived in the state of virginitie, and continues to that state, to ther lyves ende, frie of publict scandle, as said is, of Aberdeen, ...

A hospital was established off the Gallowgate, in what is now called Drum Lane, (NJ 94132 06452) in Aberdeen in 1664/67. It is believed that the delay in founding the hospital was in part due to the Magistrates of Aberdeen spending money on their clothes and finery for the Coronation of Charles I at Holyrood in 1633.

It is believed that a house was used from c1671 as a refuge for women until c 1798. During this time the residents received about £27/annum to cover their needs. The same hospital housed daughters of burgesses of Guild from 1721.

=== Litsters Hospital ===
Some evidence suggests that a hospital was used by "distressed women" associated with the Litsters Guild. This guild, the dyers guild, was not incorporated into the seven Incorporated Trades. Dating back to the twelfth century, it was principally concerned with ceremonial banners – especially for Church events before the Reformation.

=== The Trades Hospital in Old Aberdeen ===
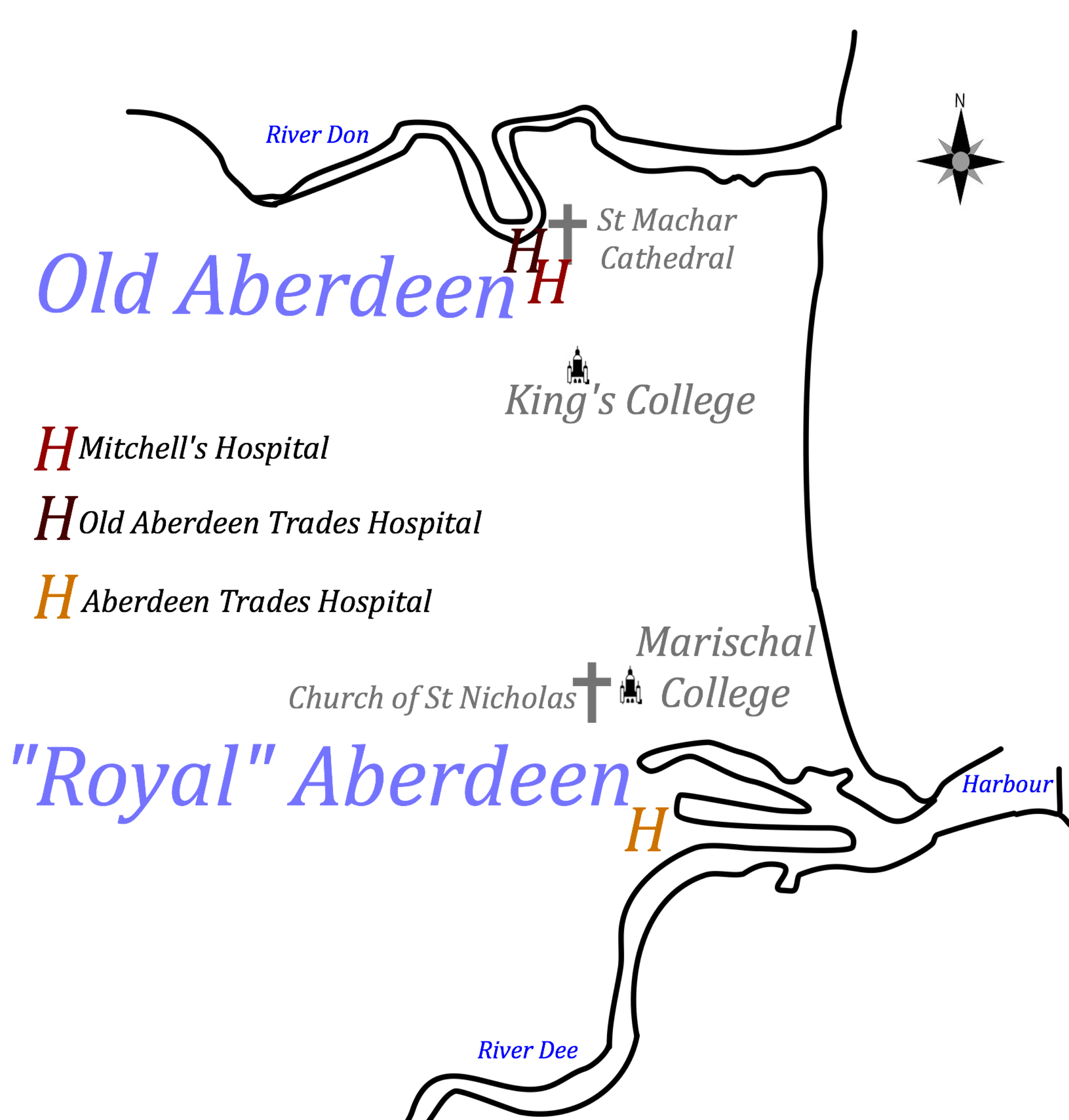
Trade Hospitals in Aberdeen

At the beginning of the eighteenth century, an important development took place in Old Aberdeen. It should be remembered, that although the burgh of Old Aberdeen is now part of the City of Aberdeen, in the eighteenth century, the two burghs had separate civic authorities, along with trades and merchant organizations. From records of the Incorporated Trades in Old Aberdeen, in 1708, an initiative to seek support for a Hospital for elderly members was started. It was a cautious beginning with a book for subscriptions being opened. The Records of the Trades Council concerning the Hospital are recorded in the Records of Old Aberdeen. which provides the following narrative.

The first entry from 13 March 1708, reads:

... the said day anent ane overture given in to the Court be the Convener for making of ane hospital of the traids house for friemens relicts and orphants reduced to povertie ... to sie what collections may be obtained for that effect and to gett there subscriptions in the sd. book...

The hospital is described as follows:

“” ane laith house of one story high of two couple lenth of ston and mud and the dyks to be helped ...””

On 11 November 1710, little progress appears to have been made. However, the Deacon Court decided to seek out a Patron "" .. discreet gentleman of a pious lyfe and conversan .."" to ""..to oversee and manage all affairs relative thertoo .."".

“... the Deacons and masters of the said Court that it would be very convenient and necessary for the Relicks of decayed Tradesmen if any feasible methods might be thought upon for building a hospital! for them to live in .. ...”

By 28 April 1711, progress had been made and a plan for the hospital had been drawn up and the relative contributions from the then five trades in Old Aberdeen appear to be secure.

... the said day it is statute and ordayned with consent of the haill court the work of the new hospitall in the Traids land shall be caried on with all dilligence to witt to build it thrie roume lenth, two storie heigh, to witt five foott and ane halff above the jest of ston work one of the thrie heigh roumes to be a little heigher then the rest with ane stone gavell and with two back and bosom chimleys therin and to be tylled above with thrie doors in the laich storie and two doores in wpper storie for which the haill fyve Traids ar to advance so much moe at first for carreing on the work...

By November of that year discussions started with regard to the allocation of rooms for the residents. The allocation was to be in relation to the contribution and influence each of the individual Trades exercised. In 1712, when the building was complete, the Convener Court were able to ask the Principal of King's College, Dr. George Middleton (1684-1717), to be the Patron of the Hospital.; On 24 May 1712, the Trades Council visited the building which had been completed to carry out the negotiations between the different Trades as to who was given which room for their relicks. Attendance on the day appears to have been important as the Fleshers were allocated a room by default as they had not been in attendance!

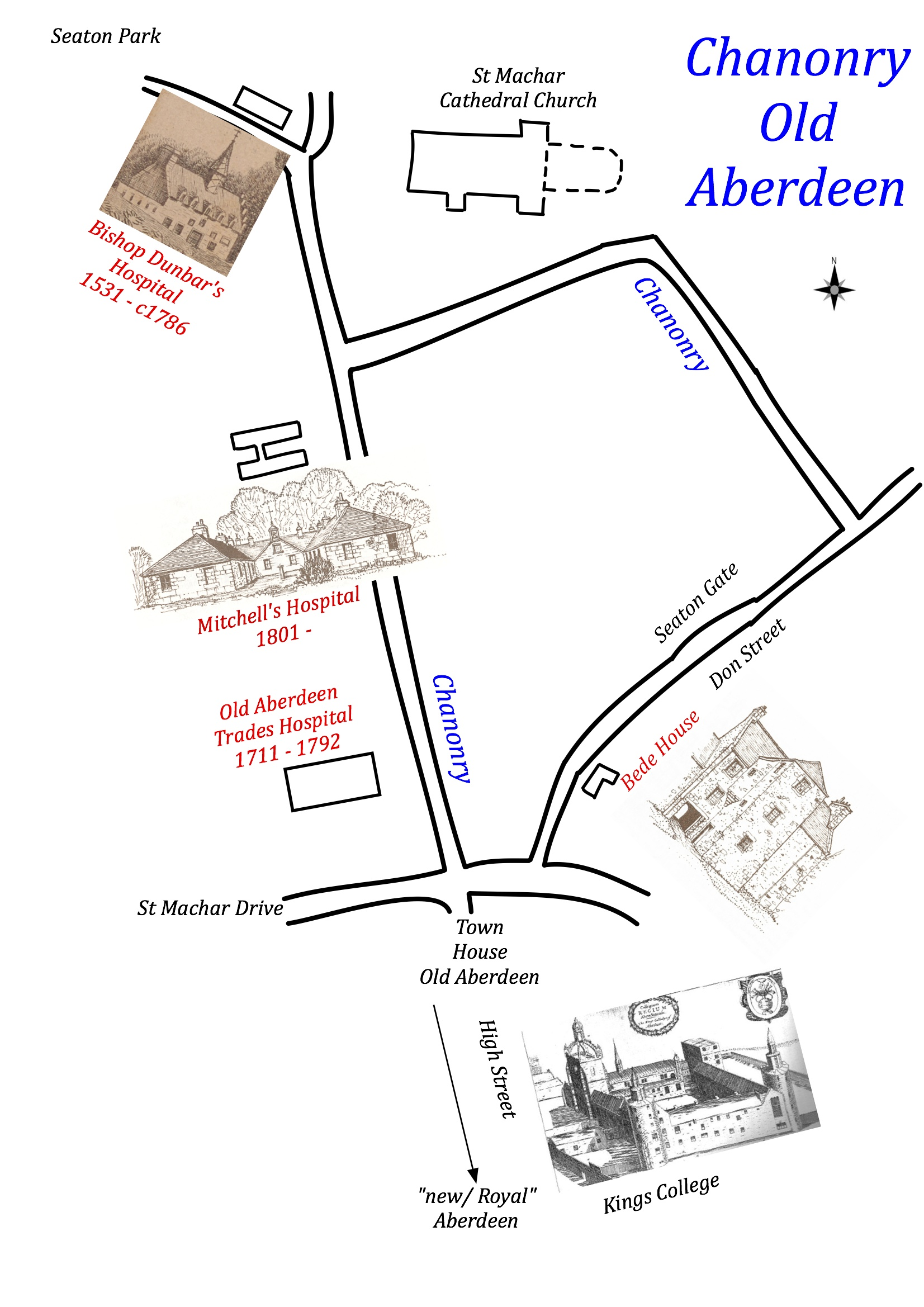
The Chanonry Old Aberdeen - Bedehouses, Hospitals - 1532 to 2014

“... the hammermen made choisse of the laigh vest chalmer forgainst the well The weavers made choisse of the midle laigh roome nixt the hammermen The tyliours made choiss of the laigh roome nixt the street The shoomaker trade made choisse of the uppermost east chalmer and the fleshers did not apear that day for which causs we referd the fifth roome being the midle roome above for them and the bakers Being all fuly satisfied w' the sd. rooms the sd. James Dugied present conviner did go frome the consull housse table and deliverd the severall keys to the severall respective trads and ther deacons in order to put in the widows into ther severall respective rooms...”

The story continues in an account of Old Aberdeen written by the Town Clerk, William Orem in 1725. Orem records:

... the said trades have built in the close of the aforesaid manse (Endowed by the Parson of Turriff) .. an hospital for ten poor widows, tradesmen's relicts, anno 1711. This hospital was built by contributions, and the poor women living it have not much allowance. There are an handed merks mortified to them by the deceast Alexander Mitchell, late clerk to the trades of New Aberdeen. The trades of Old Aberdeen give them some money quarterly; and they get charity from several persons of said town. There are now in it eight women, anno 1725, who get each of them quarterly twenty millings Scots from said trades, who likewise have appointed little hail-yards for them within said close. To the trades belongs the big house, which pays yearly twenty-eight pounds Scots money; and the yard and house on the street pay ??? merks...

It appears that continued funding of the hospital presented a major problem. The Records of Old Aberdeen are selective in recording the development of the hospital. Only two further entries suggest that while the hospital had been open in 1712 within fifty years disputes had broken out within the Trades and that finally, in 1792, a decision was made to sell the building.

“...their being a complaint made by the Boxmaster anent the weavers haveing applyed to the Magistrates in a matter anent placeing a woman in the hospitall contrary to the acts of the Court Which difference being laid before the Patron was settled by him But in order to prevent abuses for the future The Court unanimously agree that for the future there shall be no person received into the hospitall without calling a court of the Conveener Boxmaster and Deacons... ”

Finally, on 5 May 1792, this entry is recorded:

... in a full meeting of the Trads of Old Aberdeen it was represented to the Trades that there was a proposall to the trads for celling the house belonging to them comenly called the Hospitle and being delibrated upon they came to the following resoulation that they would cell it for fifty pound sterling and impowrs the Convneer and Box Master to make the best bargain they cane with a desctirany power for the same...

There does not appears to be a full explanation of why the hospital was closed. It is unlikely that there was no longer a need. It is more likely that the relationship between the individual Trades associations broke down with regard to the placement of elderly relicks. Perhaps the strict regime placed on the residents became intolerable. Perhaps, there were more possibilities for dependents to live with extended families in the community. For whatever reason a solution to the problem of supporting "relicks" and other family members of Incorporated Trades members was to emerge from outwith the Incorporated Trades. It came from a rather unlikely source, a graduate from Marischal College in Aberdeen. This was David Mitchell who had been born in Old Aberdeen but lived for some forty years in Holloway Down, then in Essex.

== See also ==
- Aberdeen charitable trusts
- Scottish Bedesmen
- Bishop Dunbar's Hospital
- Mitchell's Hospital Old Aberdeen
- Cowane's Hospital
- Kincardine O'Neil Hospital, Aberdeenshire
- Hospitals in medieval Scotland
- Aberdeen poorhouses
- Hospital chantry
