= Hospital chantry =

Part of a hospital dedicated to prayer

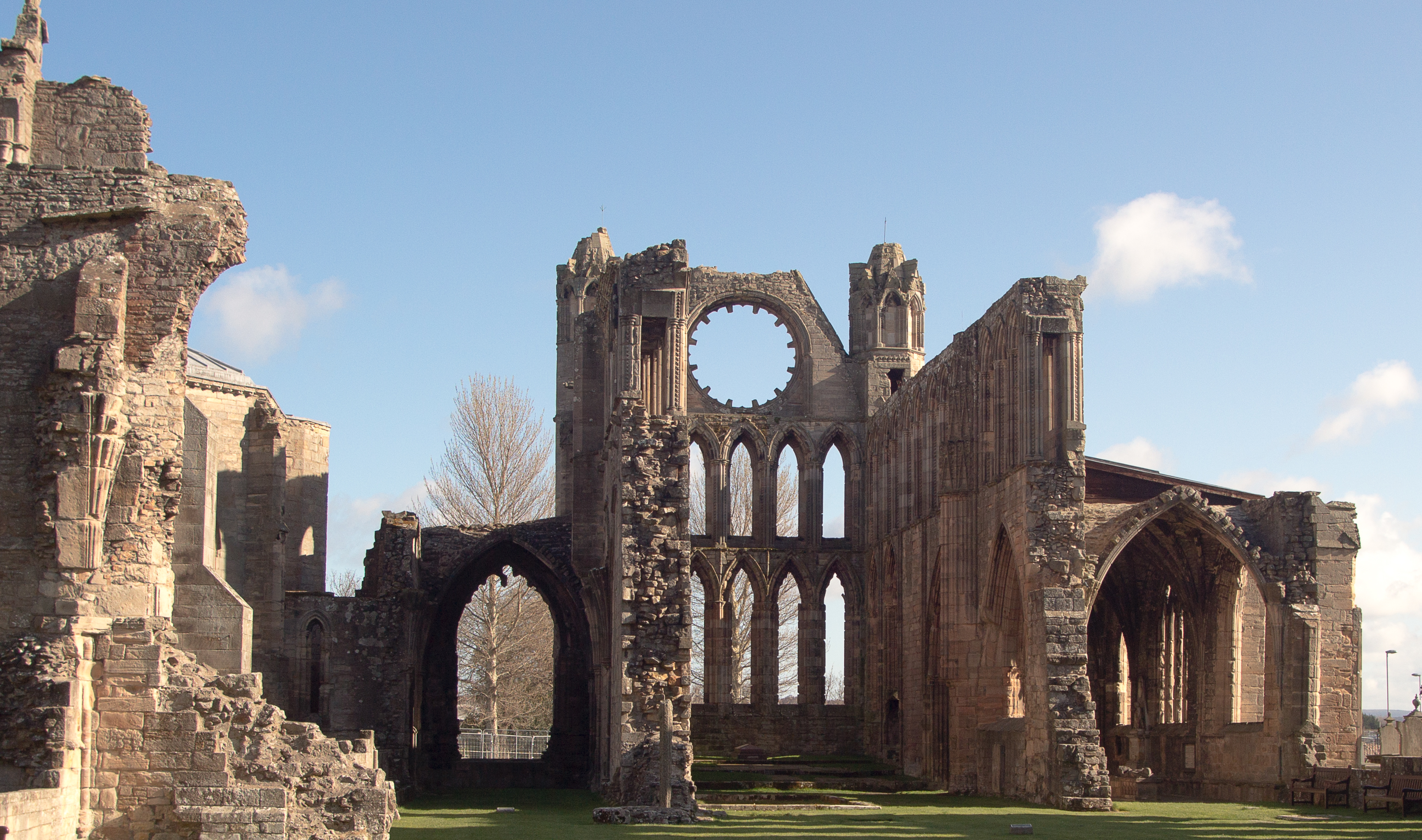
Ruins of Elgin Cathedral – location of chantry endowed in 1529 by Bishop Gavin Dunbar of Aberdeen, with two priests to say prayers for his father and mother, Sir Alexander Dunbar and Isabel Sutherland

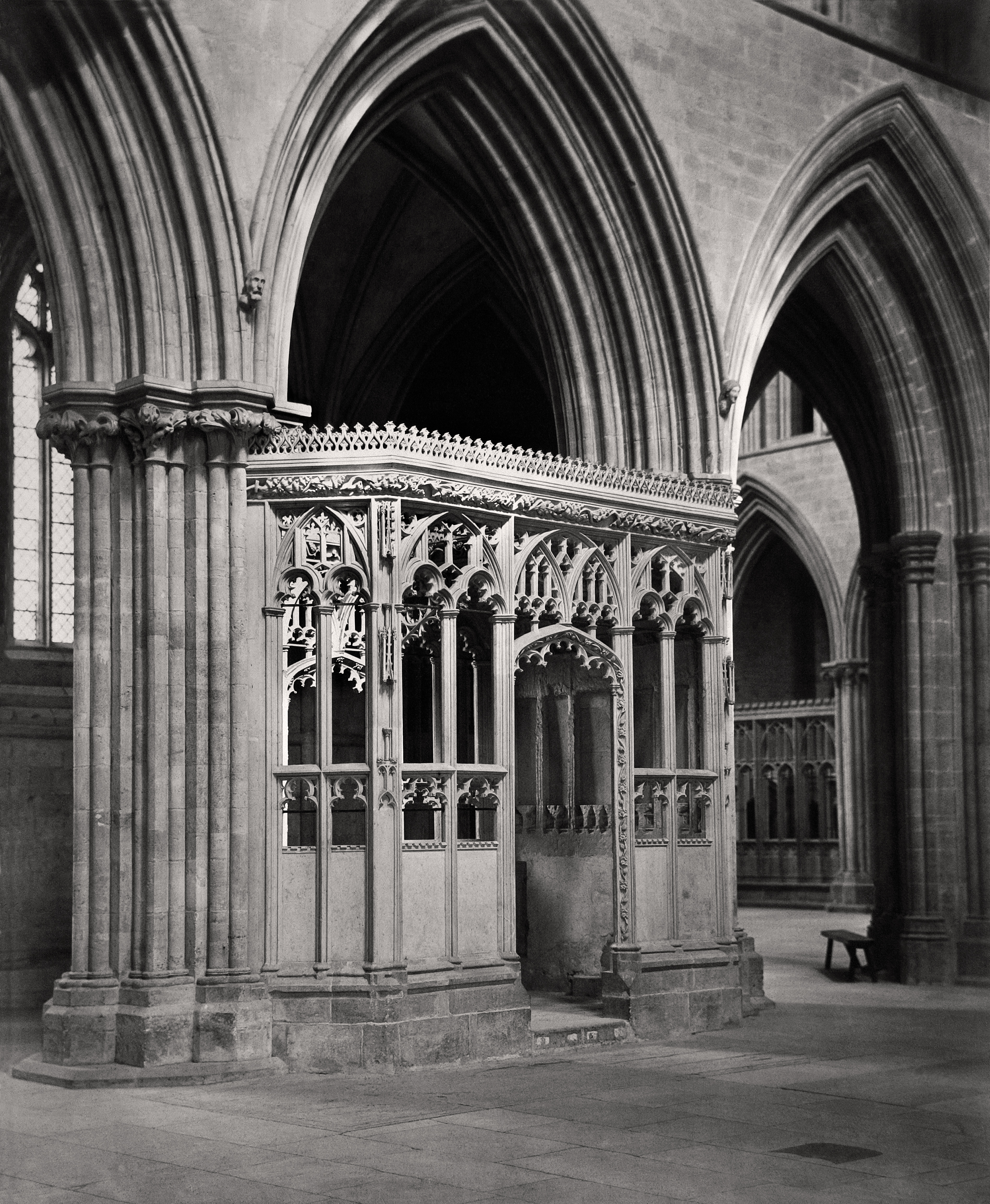
Wells Cathedral, chantry in nave by Francis Bedford

A hospital chantry is a part of a hospital dedicated to prayer.

== History ==
During the period 1100 to 1600 the western Latin Church developed a comprehensive theology of charity and what came to be known as Purgatory. In Scotland together with England and Wales, different traditions developed in the provision of care for the elderly, the sick and the dying.

In Scotland hospitals provided a number of functions: Travellers’ rest, care homes for elderly men and women; and sub-monastic prayer communities. Hospitals such as Bishop Dunbar’s Hospital in Old Aberdeen were in part prayer communities and in part care homes. Most hospitals or maison Dieu had a place or room set aside as a chantry chapel, or an oratory. (Note: In Old Aberdeen, St Mary’s Hospital (Bishop Dunbar’s Hospital) had a "…a common room sixteen wide, and thirty-six feet long, for all the poor … and opposite to it, in the south side of the house, there will be an oratory well furnished and of the same size as the common room of the house, and provided with an altar…") In the Kincardine O’Neil Hospital, the situation on a drove road offered a travellers’ rest as well as a care and prayer community. Cowan et al. provide details of some 165 hospitals that offered all or some of these functions. In England, similar conditions from the early to late medieval period applied.

In addition to care for the elderly, the church in Scotland and England became dominated by what might be called a theology of care for the elderly, (Note: The biblical teaching of charity provided a rationale for the care of the living; purgatory provided a rationale for the treatment of the dying and the dead.) The theology and practice of purgatory came to dominate the church and the country as a whole.

Across the Western world charity and purgatory became the two themes that were often in conflict. Bedehouses and hospitals were founded to meet the requirements of charity and purgatory. In response to this theology individuals often made provision for their after-life by endowing priests and others to say what became known as the Requiem Mass.

The chantry became the place where such masses where said. (Note: In general chantries were largely found in England. The Abolition of Chantries Acts of 1545 and 1547 were an attempt to withdraw power and wealth from the Church.) Chantries owe their name and function of providing an endowment or place for the maintenance of priests to sing daily mass for the souls of founders.

In some cases altars or chapels in churches were endowed in this fashion. (Note: In some cases the term "obit" is used to describe services or offices for the souls of deceased persons at the request and often expense of families. "Obit" is sometimes recorded as "obiit" – Latin for "he/she/ it died".)

In Scotland Bishop Dunbar, in the months before he died in 1532, founded a "chantry" or chapel in Elgin Cathedral in memory of his father and mother. The mortification records his wishes and obligations as follows:

…in honorem Sanctse Trinitatis et fanctorum Columbae et Thomae martyris, et pro falute animarum Regis ejufque predeceflbrum et fucceflbrum, Alexandri Dunbar de Weftfeld militis et dominse Elizabethie Suthirland ejus fponfse…"

Howard Colvin provides a definitive account of the origins of chantries in England. Further evidence of their Anglo-Norman origins is provided by David Crouch. Colvin summarizes the situation as follows:

… in origin the chantry can therefore be seen as the answer to what was essentially a monastic problem: how to continue effectively to intercede for an army of the dead whose ranks were already growing uncontrollably even before the official recognition of Purgatory had drawn fresh attention to their predicament. It was a privatised means of salvation devised to cope with an increasing demand for intercession with which the established monastic corporations could not cope … the chantry may well have satisfied, in a way acceptable to the Church, the deep-rooted desire for a religious establishment under private control which, in its grosser forms, had been stamped out by the reforms of the twelfth century. Its flexibility in terms both of endowment and of duration enabled it – unlike the monastic foundation – to be adapted to the means of all ranks of society, so that what had begun largely as a form of seigneurial piety came in time to be adopted by the new squirearchy of the later middle ages and by self-made men like wool-merchants, who could identify with a parish church in a way that they perhaps could not with an old-established monastery of royal or baronial foundation …

In general functions provided in chantries where they were separate establishments – e.g. Noseley, St Anne's Chapel in Barnstaple, Devon and Lincoln Cathedral were the same as those provided in many of the medieval hospitals and bedehouses in Scotland. (Note: The term maison Dieu is also applied to these foundations. For example, Maison Dieu, Faversham.)

== See also ==
- Hospitals in medieval Scotland
- Aberdeen trades hospitals
- Mitchell's Hospital Old Aberdeen
- Kincardine O'Neil Hospital, Aberdeenshire
- Scottish Bedesmen
