= Beggar's badge =

Identifying insignia once worn in Great Britain and Ireland

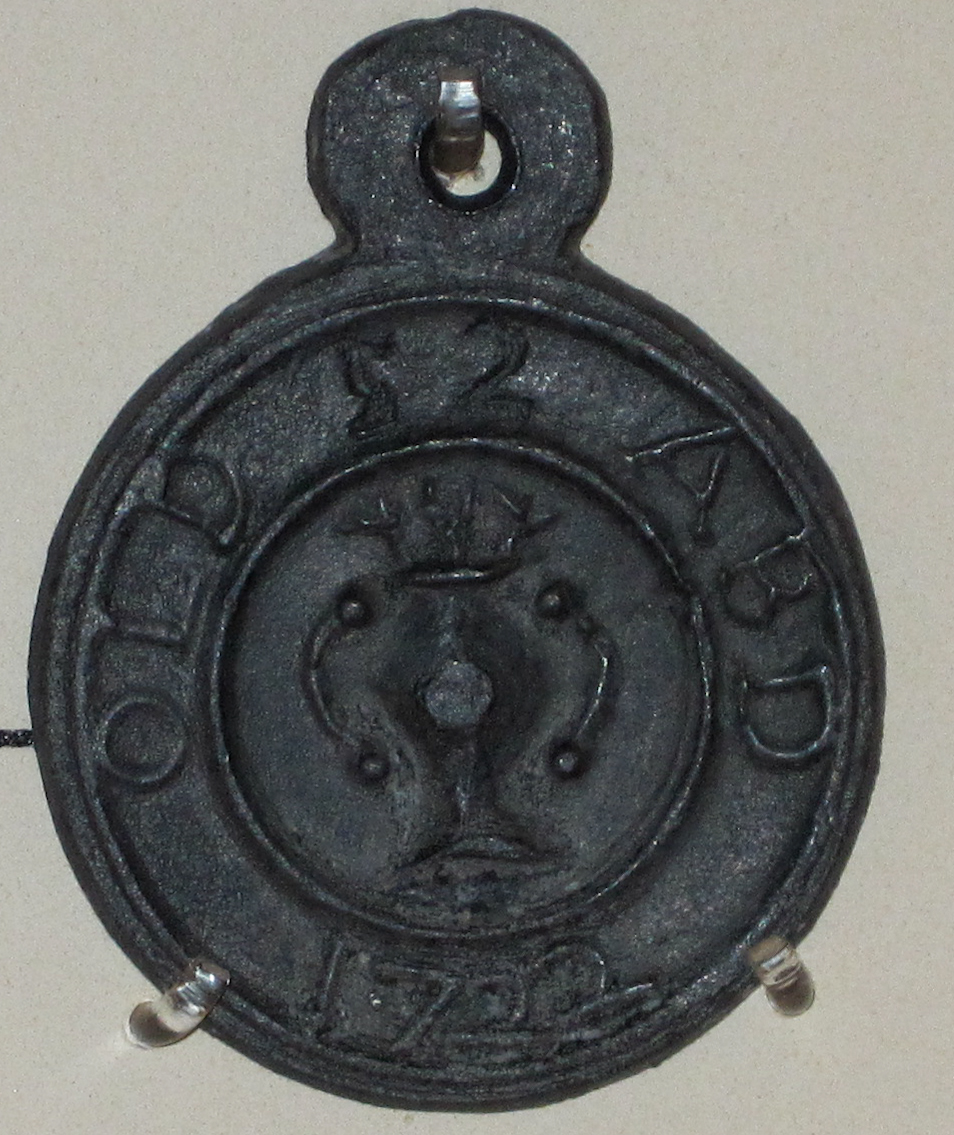
Old Aberdeen Beggar's Badge

Beggars' badges were identifying insignia worn by beggars beginning in the early fifteenth century in Great Britain and Ireland. They were physical badges or other markers, and they served two purposes; to identify individual beggars, and to allow beggars to move freely from place to place.

== Origins ==
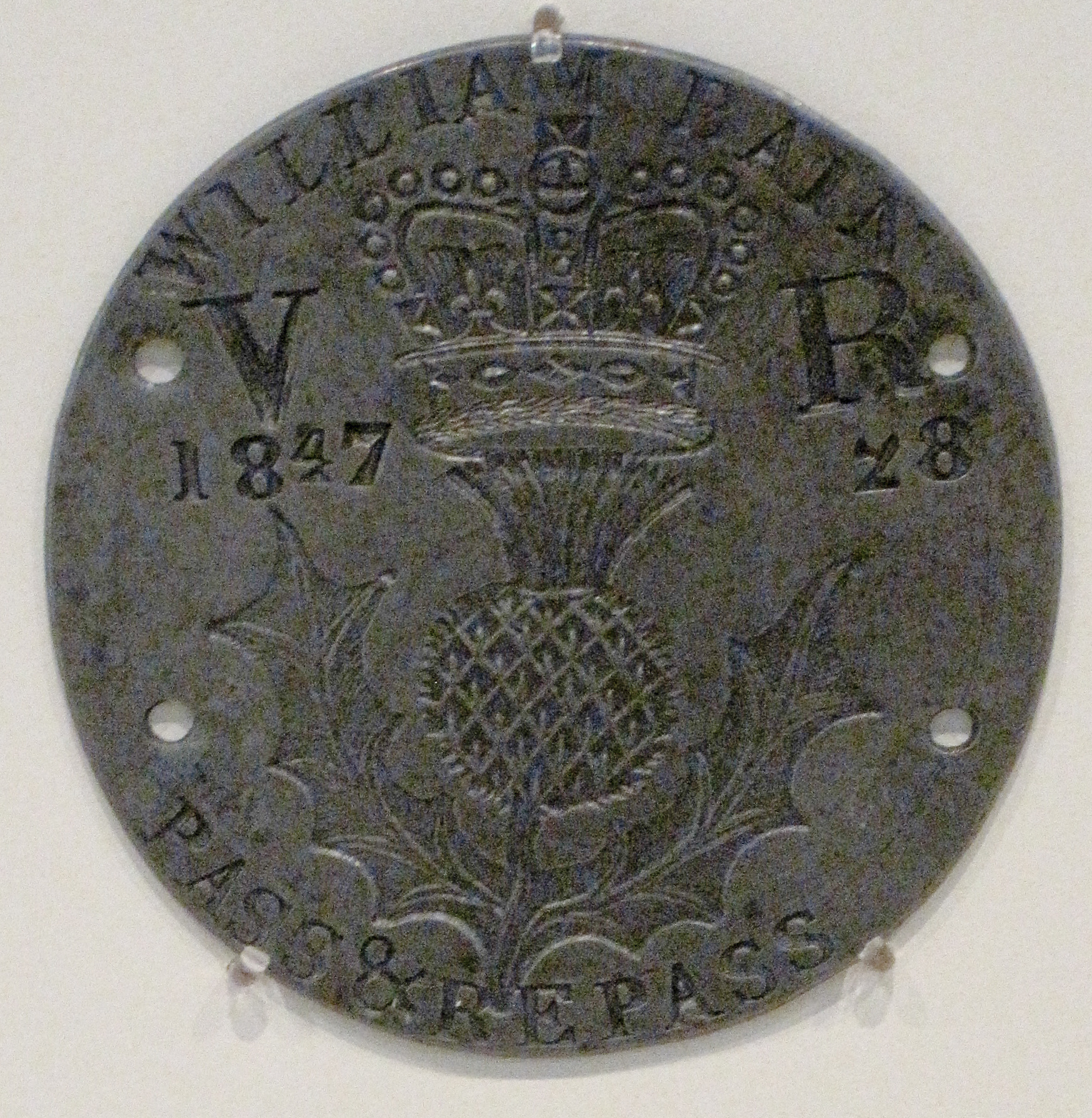
Scottish beggar's badge from the nineteenth century issued to a William Bain in 1847. Notice the "Pass & Re-Pass inscription.

It was not until the introduction of poor laws across the nations of Great Britain and Ireland that the "problem" of the poor was properly addressed. In England and Scotland, from the time of the old poor laws in Elizabethan times, some form of safety net was provided for the destitute. The Victorian poor laws set in place the basis for modern social care. In addition to unclassified poor, there were bedesmen. Bedesmen were elderly men and in some cases women, who were cared for by the Church or civic authorities. Bedesmen were housed in hospitals from the early twelfth century. Cowan and Easson provide the most comprehensive account of medieval hospitals. Many such hospitals were chantries with bedesmen.

However, many poor were left to fend for themselves in towns and villages across the whole country. Such an unregulated situation caused many local problems. The earliest known reference to beggars badges is quoted in Balfour Paul's survey of badges, published in the nineteenth century. He claims that there was a regulation in Valencia, Spain that required poor men to wear a leaden badge stamped with the arms of Valencia. In Britain, from as early as the fifteenth century, badges were introduced to identify beggars. Badges served two purposes; first they enabled civic and church authorities to control those who were allowed to ask for alms. For example, in 1425, an act of the Scottish Parliament declared:

... Alsua it is ordanyt that na thigar be thollyt to thyg nor bege nothir in burghe nor to lande betuix xiiij and iij score [and ten] of yheris of age bot thai be seyne be the consall of the toune or of the cuntre at thai may nocht vyne thar leyffing othir vays. And thai that sa beis fundin sall have a takin to land of the schera and in bwrowis off the aldirmen and baylyheis, and that undir the payn of birnynge on the cheyk and bannyssing of the cuntre ...

Translation:

... Also it is ordained that no beggar be suffered to thig [meaning to beg or ask for charity] or beg either in burghs or in the land between fourteen and seventy years of age, unless it is seen by the council of the town that they cannot make their living in other ways. And they that are so found shall have a token from the sheriff in the land, and from the aldermen and bailies in the burghs, and that under pain of burning on the cheek and banishing from the country ...

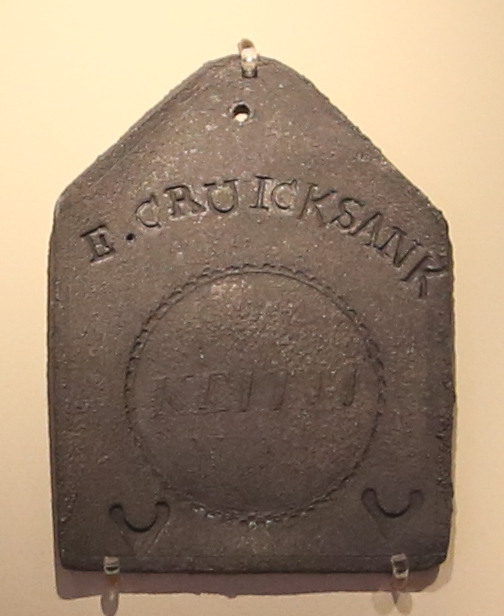
A Beggar's badge issued in Keith

The punishments indicated here were typical of the times. Similar sentiments were still prevalent in the eighteenth century. In Ireland, Jonathan Swift wrote a pamphlet supporting the control of beggars (Swift, 1737). In it he writes:

I have for some years past applied myself to several Lord Mayors, and to the late Archbishop of Dublin for a remedy to this evil of foreign beggars; and they all appeared ready to receive a very plain proposal, I mean, that of badging the original poor of every parish, who begged in the streets; that the said beggars should be confined to their own parishes; that, they should wear their badges well sewn upon one of their shoulders, always visible, on pain of being whipped and turned out of town; or whatever legal punishment may be thought proper and effectual.

Control of the "... evil of foreign beggars ..." was uppermost in Swift's purpose. In England, in the reign of Edward VI, an act of Parliament required beggars to:

weare openly upon him both on the breast and back of the uttermost garment some notable badge of token...

The second purpose badges served was to identify and permit the free movement of beggars from place to place. The royal bedesmen in Scotland wore a badge inscribed "Pass and Re-Pass" indicating their right to move from burgh to burgh to ask for alms without hindrance. While some bedesmen and royal bedesmen did have badges, it does not appear that bedesmen in general had such identifying insignia. Some bedesmen had to wear gowns – blue gowns in Scotland. However, there is no evidence that bedesmen in cities and such as Glasgow or Aberdeen had any insignia or badges.

== References in art and literature ==
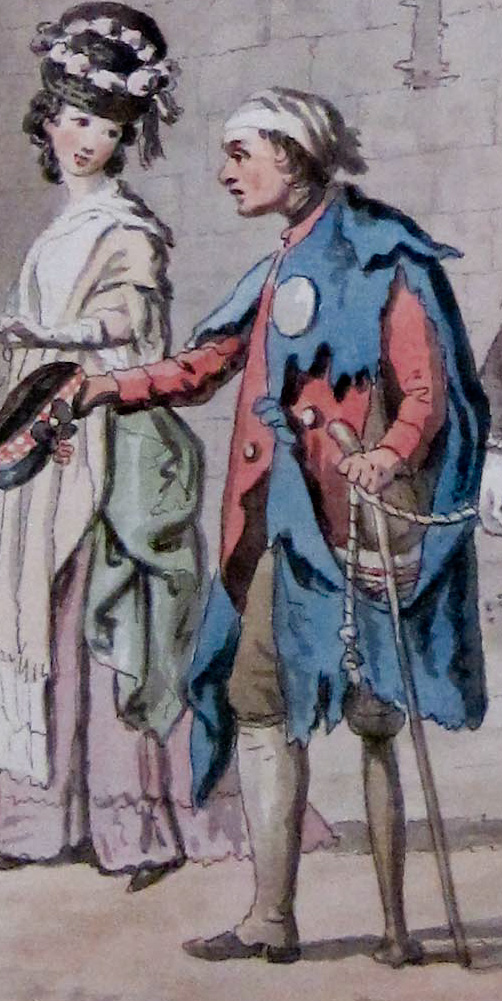
Portion of A Peg-legged Beggar, with Donkey and Children by David Allan

In art and in literature there are very few examples of beggars shown wearing badges. In a recent book on poverty in art, there are no images of beggars wearing badges. (Nichols, 2007) There is however one example in a print by the eighteenth-century Scottish artist David Allan called A Peg-legged Beggar, with Donkey and Children that shows a beggar outside Edinburgh Old Town wearing a badge. The beggar is disabled and appears to be an ex-serviceman. The blue gown (or cloak) suggests that he is a bedesman or blue gown.

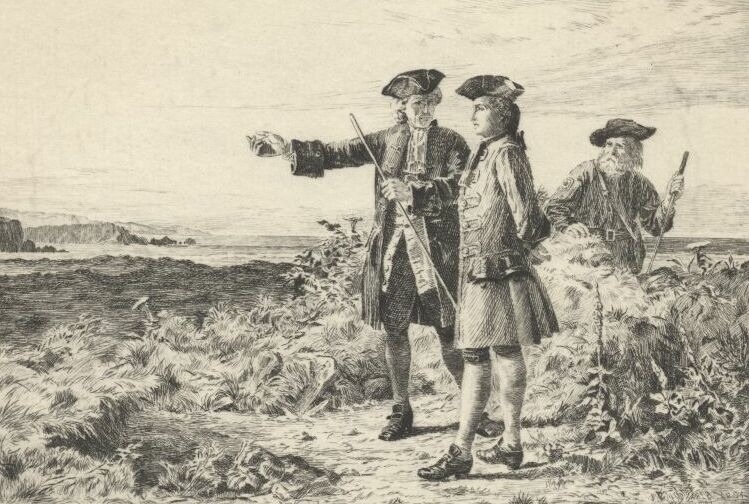
Eddie Ochiltree from the novel The Antiquary, by Sir Walter Scott

Probably the best known "beggar" is Eddie Ochiltree, a character in Sir Walter Scott's The Antiquary. In an extended preface Scott provides a context for the character based on a mendicant or beggar Andrew Gemmells. Scott bases Ochiltree on his own memories of Gemmells. Gemmells was probably not a royal bedesman but an eccentric character who travelled the Scottish borders, especially in Gala, Tweed, Ettrick and Yarrow. Andrew Gemmels died in 1789. During the late eighteenth century, mendicants were not uncommon across Scotland. Robert Burns also makes reference to beggars. It is likely that Burns and Scott were both referring to a small band of travelling mendicants who entertained people in order to be given alms. Some may have been royal bedesmen with the light blue gown and begging badge. Scott also references his time at the University of Edinburgh c. 1783/1784 when a "... venerable Bedesman ... stood by Potter Row ..." begging. By Scott's time the term bedesman was synonymous with beggar or mendicant. See also Scott's autobiography. Illustrations of Eddie Ochiltree published in early editions of The Antiquary do not show Ochiltree wearing a badge. While examples of badges in art or literature may not accurately reflect contemporary reality, their lack does suggest that badge wearing by beggars was not universal. The image from The Antiquary, showing Ochiltree in the background does not clarify if he is a royal bedesmen or if he is wearing a badge.

== Examples ==
There are many examples of badges including beggars' badges held in museums and some private collections across the UK. There appears to be a significant number of such badges in Scotland. In some cases, churches issued communion tokens in lieu of beggar's badges. Other civic organization also issued badges to street porters. There are examples of pilgrims' badges – worn by pilgrims on pilgrimages to shrines e.g. Santiago de Compostela. The scallop shell badge is still used by walkers and pilgrims on the Camino de Santiago (Way of St. James). The National Museum of Scotland has a collection of 110 badges, 20 of which are on permanent display. Glasgow Museums have four badges, one from Dundee, the others from Rothsay. The University of Aberdeen holds seven badges among which are examples of badges from Old Aberdeen and from across the north east of Scotland. Probably the finest example of a beggars badge is held at the National Museum in Edinburgh. It is a royal bedesmen badge inscribed "Pass and Re-Pass". This badge provides a strong link between bedesmen and beggars. A comprehensive survey of northern Irish badges is found in Seaby and Paterson.

== See also ==
- Bede House, Old Aberdeen
- Hospitals in medieval Scotland
- Aberdeen trades hospitals
- Kincardine O'Neil Hospital, Aberdeenshire
- Scottish Bedesmen
- Soutra Aisle
- Provand's Lordship – the "Physic" garden in Glasgow, Scotland.
- David Allan
- Bishop Dunbar's Hospital
- Aberdeen poorhouses
- Pilgrim badge
