= Jean Guild =

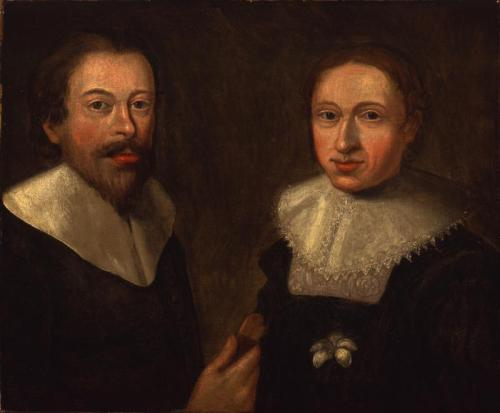
- Jean with her husband David Anderson
- Born: Jean Guild bap. 1573
- Died: 1667
- Other name: Jean Anderson
- Known for: philanthropy
- Spouse: Davie Do a'thing

Jean Guild became Jean Anderson (1573 – 1667), was a Scottish philanthropist in Aberdeenshire. She created an Aberdeen charitable trust that cared for orphans.

== Life ==
Guild was born in 1573. She had two sisters and her brother was William Guild and her parents were Marjorie (born Donaldson) and Matthew Guild. Her father was a wealthy armourer of Aberdeen, who was the Deacon of the Guild of Hammermen.

She married David Anderson who was a talented mechanic and engineer. He was of such renown that he was known as "Davie Do a'thing". One of the stories told of his cleverness was his success at removing a large rock that was blocking the entrance to the harbour in Aberdeen. Her husband designed and built a large raft constructed from casks. At low tide he attached the raft to the rock and as the tide came in it lifted the raft and the rock. At this point the raft and rock were moved away.

Her husband died on 9 October 1629 leaving her a rich widow, but with five daughters and a son, David. She used her money to fund a hospital where ten orphans could be cared for. She gifted enough land for the hospital and 4,700 Scots Merks to create the facility. The money was not only for the upkeep for these children but also for their education. Boys were to be looked after until they were eighteen. Girls were allowed in the facility but they had to leave when they were fifteen although they could leave sooner if they had a legal means of maintaining themselves.

Her husband has been given credit for creating the hospital but it was not created until after his death. She may easily have been inspired to this philanthropic act by her brother who was an advocate for good deeds as well as by the wishes of her dead husband. William gave a hospital to Aberdeen in 1633 for artisans to use. She incorporated the idea of education for her orphans although the gift would only be given to unknown orphans if there were none recommended by herself of her relatives.

She herself died on 9 January 1667 and she is thought to have been buried near her husband in the Kirk of St Nicholas in Aberdeen.
