= Aberdeen poorhouses =

Like most cities and towns across Scotland, Aberdeen and its twin city of Old Aberdeen had poorhouses to complement the provision for the poor and need provided by the church, the merchants and the trades. A Poor Hospital was founded in 1741. This replaced the "Correction House" dating from the 1636/7

== The House of Correction ==
A workhouse or what was known as a House of Correction was founded on the initiative of Provost Jaffrey from a patent granted by Charles I in 1636/7 for vagrants and delinquents, giving lodging and employment for those connected with the Cloth Trade. The building, in what is now Correction Wynd (NJ 94107 06250) adjacent to Union Street, was built at a cost of 2000 merks. The record of the Council decision, dated 8 February 1637 is as follows:

“ ...ane correctioun hous salbe erected within the same burghe, and the tred of making of bredcloath, carseyis, seyis, ... for advancing the wertew and suppressing the vyce amongst the commons...”

The Council laid down a very detailed plan for the funding, the building of the poorhouse and drew a wide group of likely beneficiaries:

“ ...all vagabonds, strong and sturdie beggares, idle and maisterles persones strong in bodie and habill to work, servants disobedient to maisteris, children disobedient to parentis, leud leivars, pyikers, commoun scoldis, and wncorrigible harlottis, not amending be the discipline of the kirk, ...”

The work ethic was "srtrict Puritan" with:

“...ane habill man to attend the saids prisoneris, and hald thame at wark, and to cans ane of his sei-vands evcrie Sabboth day reid jiraycris unto thame...”

The facility catered for 20 "...vagabonds, strong and sturdie beggares...(etc).." and 10 "obstinate sinners" set to "soul cleansing work". The cloth work and the punishing regime was abandoned in 1711. Almost certainly as the trade in cloth had declined and there was not sufficient benefit to the merchants. From the account of the Council it would appear that the hospital/ poorhouse/ "prison" served a dual purpose: first, it provided some care of the poor and needy in a secure institution; second, it allowed merchants and tradesmen access to cheap labour. It is likely that the merchants needs were greater than the needs of the poor. Conditions in similar "houses of correction" elsewhere in the country were also notoriously harsh. The treatment of the poor unwilling to work and those willing to work was often identical. Courts of law often used such establishments to punish what was then considered "criminal" acts.

(Aberdeen) “....30th August, 1640.... The same day ... Agnes Hay, guilty of fornication with William Ross, soldier, under promise of marriage, and bands proclaimed, was ordered to be carried to the correction-house, and, on Saturday next, to be taken to the cross, and set in the branks, having her head clipped; and to make her repentance on Sunday : and to be conveyed back to the correction-house, where she was to remain during the pleasure of the session......”

It appears that Christian Charity may have been a secondary consideration in the setting up of this Poorhouse in the seventeenth century.

== The Poor House ==
In October 1741 a Poorhouse was opened on the north side of the Castlegate. (NJ 94517 06369) It consisted of accommodation for men and women. The men's accommodation was for " .. males of vicious or disorderly habits, idle strollers and vagabonds..." They were taught or required to rasp wood, dress hemp, flax, and pick oakum. The women, were required knit stockings and weave linsey woolsey cloth. The regime was severe, almost puritanical. The founders, The City Council agreed:

“ ... to give George Gordon, merchant, a commission to buy for. each bed a harden sheet, a harden bolster, and two pairs' of Murray blankets, besides a covering of Steenhive sacking. Patrick Barron is to make a bed, as a pattern, in the easiest manner he can, in order to compute the price of the bedsteads; and the Committee are of opinion that the vagabonds doe lye in the vaults on straw, with a covering of sacking. A master, a mistress; and a clerk, to live in the House, are selected. The master's salary to be 100 pounds Scots; the mistress', 100 merks; and the clerk's, the same. Mr. James Kemp and his wife are the first master and mistress. ...”

The nature of the tasks changed but the puritanical regime continued until 1818. The Daily Task Books of the Poorhouse provide a fearful account of the life and times of both boys, men and women.

By 1845, Scotland had its own Poor Law (Scottish Poor Laws) Poorhouses and workhouses still provided some secure care for the needy and a cheap form of labour. Charitable organisation, e.g. The Bishop Dunbar Hospital Trust; The David Mitchell Hospital Trust and the Dr. William Guild Managers continue to provide care of "Bedesmen", "the Auld Maids" and retired members of the Incorporated Trades, their "relicks" and other dependents. The Seven Incorporated Trades of Aberdeen still provides charitable support for its members and their families as well as a wider community connected to the Trades.

== See also ==
- Beggar's badge
- Hospitals in medieval Scotland
- Aberdeen trades hospitals
- Kincardine O'Neil Hospital, Aberdeenshire
- Scottish Bedesmen
