= Cowane's Hospital =

- Patrons of Cowane's Hospital Trust
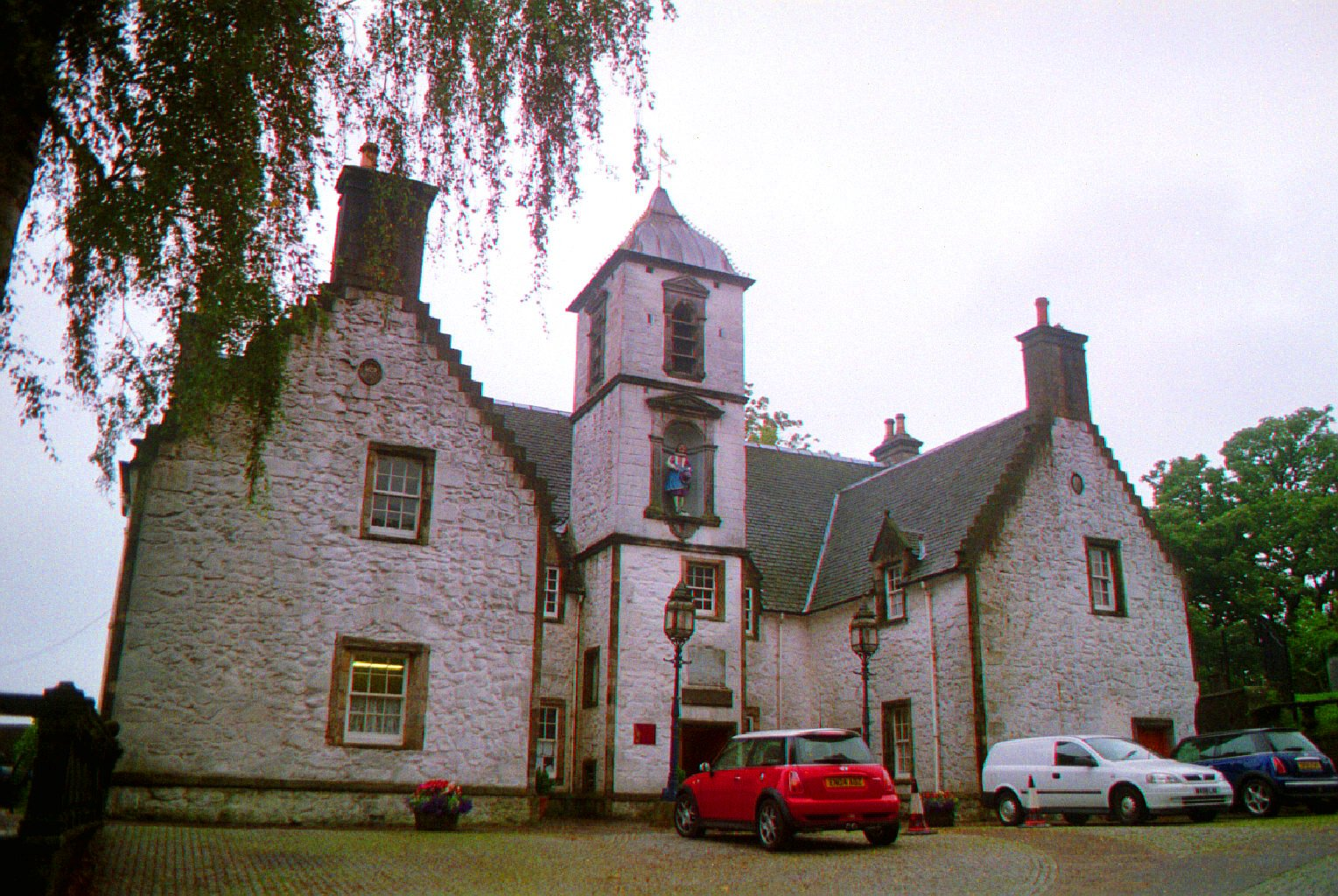
- Cowane's Hospital

- Shown in Stirling

Geography
- Location: Stirling, Scotland, United Kingdom
- Coordinates: 56.1205°N 3.9451°W

Organisation
- Care system: Almshouse
- Patron: John Cowane

Services
- Emergency department: No Accident & Emergency

History
- Founded: 1637

Links
- Lists: Hospitals in Scotland

Inventory of Gardens and Designed Landscapes in Scotland
- Official name: Cowane's Hospital
- Designated: 16 March 2012
- Reference no.: GDL00400

Cowane's Hospital is a 17th-century almshouse in the Old Town of Stirling, Scotland. It was established in 1637 with a bequest of 40,000 merks from the estate of the merchant John Cowane (1570–1633). Subsequently converted for use as a Guildhall the building is considered by Historic Scotland to be "a rare survival of 17th century burgh architecture and one of the finest buildings of its kind in Scotland." It was listed at category A in 1965. The gardens are also seen as a "rare survival" of an institutional garden of the 17th century, and were included in the national Inventory of Gardens and Designed Landscapes in 2012. The hospital is located on St John Street, between the medieval Church of the Holy Rude and the 19th-century Old Town Jail.

== John Cowane ==
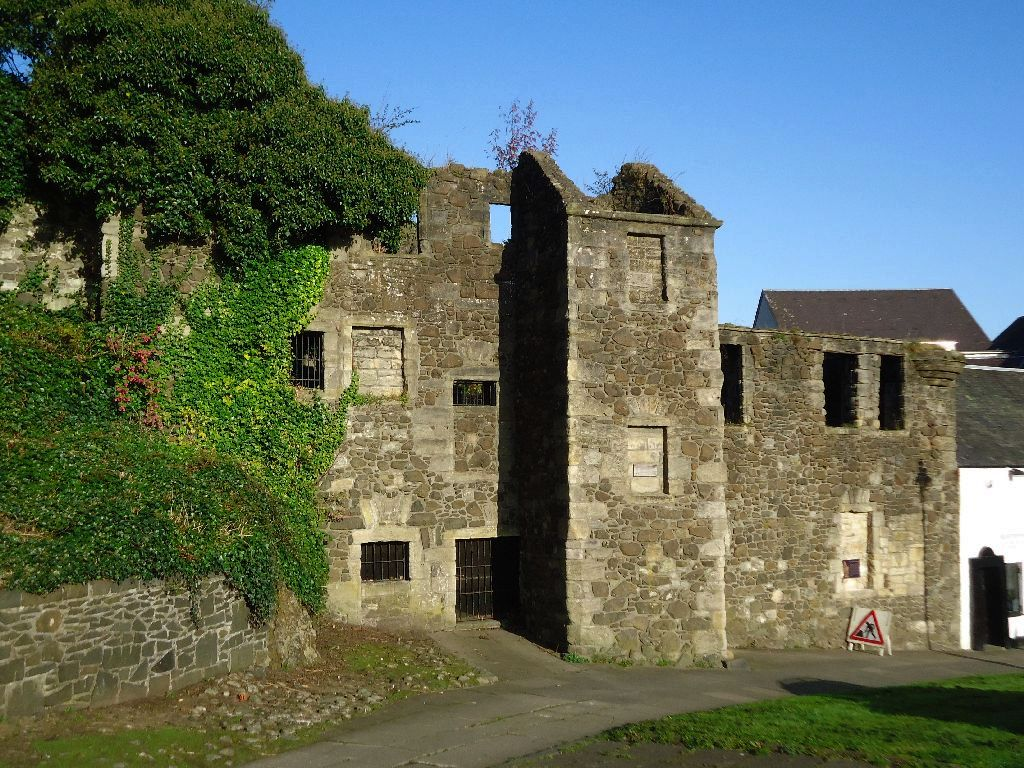
John Cowane's House, St Mary's Wynd

John Cowane was descended from a family of Stirling merchants who had been trading with the Dutch since the early 16th century. The Cowanes exported fish, coal and wool in exchange for luxuries such as prunes, saffron and spices which were supplied to the royal court of James V at Stirling Castle. John Cowane also ventured into money lending, invested in shipping, and was a substantial landlord in the burgh. He served on the town council, was elected Dean of Guild in 1624, and sat in the Parliament of Scotland from 1625–1632. He never married, though in 1611 he was fined £6 for fathering a child out of wedlock: the mother was also fined and forced to do public penance. Cowane lived on St Mary's Wynd, in the building which still bears his name. John Cowane's house, though ruined, was purchased and preserved in 1924 by the trust he established.

On his death in 1633, Cowane was a wealthy man. He left sums of money to numerous charitable causes, including 500 merks to the Church of the Holy Rude. The largest bequest was the 40,000 merks which he left for the establishment of a hospital. This was intended to provide for "twelve decayed guild brethren", that is, elderly members of the Merchant Guildry of Stirling who could no longer support themselves. The establishment of a hospital, or almshouse, would allow them to live rent-free in their old age. In the 1630s a merk was worth two-thirds of a Scots pound, and was equivalent to one English shilling. The hospital was to be managed by a trust, overseen by Patrons who were drawn from the town council, the guilds, and kirk ministers.

== Establishment of the hospital ==
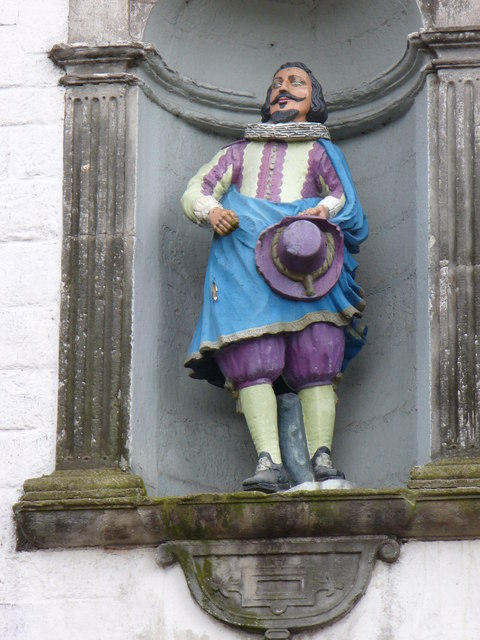
"Auld Staneybreeks": statue of John Cowane on the hospital building

John Cowane's brother, Alexander, acted as his executor and signed the hospital's Deed of Foundation on 13 February 1637. The land, sited adjacent to the Church of the Holy Rude in a prestigious part of the town, was transferred to the Town Council, and plans for the new building were commissioned from the royal master-mason John Mylne. As with Mylne's other architectural work, the design shows contemporary Dutch influences, notably the form of the bell tower and crow-step gables. In a niche on the tower is a statue of John Cowane, sculpted by Mylne and William Ayton. The statue, locally known as "Auld Staneybreeks" (old stone-trousers), is said to come to life and dance in the courtyard at Hogmanay (New Year).

The hospital was constructed by the master-mason John Rynd. Existing buildings on the site were demolished in early 1637, and the uneven ground was levelled by burning peat in order to shatter the hard underlying rock. At the rear of the site is the defensive town wall, which was constructed in the 16th century, and the hospital building may have been conceived as forming part of the town's defences. Building proceeded through the troubled period of the mid-17th-century, when a series of conflicts affected Scotland and Britain: the hospital was not completed until 1643, and may not have been fully complete until 1660. In any case the building appears to have been unoccupied until at least 1661 when repairs had to be made. In the 1660s the grounds of the hospital were levelled and laid out with ornamental gardens, as well as vegetable, fruit and herb gardens, and terraces overlooking the Carse of Forth to the east. An elaborate carved sundial was set up in 1673. William Stevenson, gardener at the hospital from 1667, is recorded as having ordered plants from Holland, including apricot, peach and almond trees.

== Conversion to the Guildhall ==
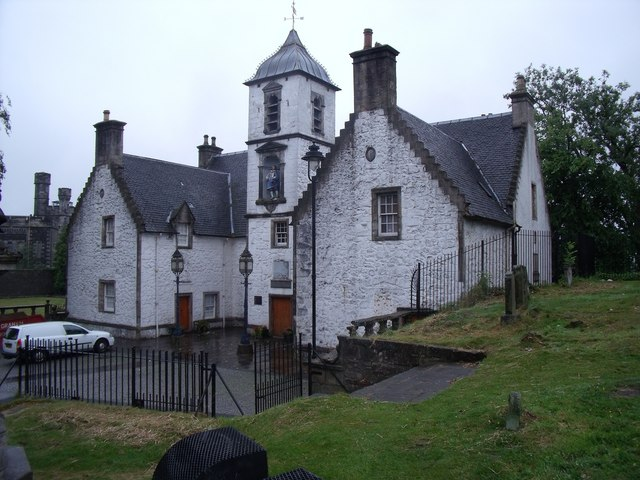
Cowane's Hospital seen from the adjacent churchyard

During the later 17th and early 18th century the hospital was well-used by pensioners, though a strict set of rules seems to have discouraged some from taking up residence. Further improvements to the gardens were ordered in 1712 when Thomas Harlaw, gardener to the Earl of Mar, was appointed to draw up plans for the site. A bowling green was subsequently laid out, surrounded by balustraded terraces and Dutch-style parterres of box hedging with herbs and flowers. Despite subsequent changes the gardens largely remain as they were laid out at this time. From around 1720 the trustees switched to a policy of providing for pensioners in their own homes, and the hospital was converted, by removing internal partitions, into a hall for use of the Merchant Guildry. The building was subsequently referred to as the Guildhall.

In 1832 the building was pressed into service as an isolation hospital during a cholera epidemic which killed around one-third of Stirling's population. Further alterations were made to the interior in 1852 to create a single large hall. The works were designed by Francis Mackison, burgh architect of Stirling, in the Gothic Revival style, and included a new roof, and a timber gallery and panelling. The exterior of the building remained unchanged.

== Later history ==
During the 19th century, the Patrons of the Cowane's Hospital Trust began to invest in property, acquiring a substantial holding of lands. From 1957 the income of the trust was divided, with half going to the Stirling Educational Trust, and half being used by the Patrons for the provision of housing. The role of elected councillors as Patrons of the Hospital Trust came into question in the later 20th century, following land deals between the trust and the council which, it was claimed, did not fully benefit the interests of the charitable trust. In 2003 the relationship was further questioned following irregularities over the sale of trust-owned land, for which the provost of Stirling, Tommy Brookes, was stripped of his office. In 2009 the trust petitioned the Court of Session to change their constitution, limiting the role of councillors in the decisions of the trust. Subsequent negotiation led to an agreement that councillors would continue to form the majority of the Patrons, in line with the wishes of John Cowane, but that their voting rights on certain matters would be limited.

The hospital building itself is now used as a venue, and remains in use by the Merchant Guildry. It is run by the Cowane's Hospital Trust, with the aim of using income from the building to secure its future.

In April, 2019, the Patrons of Cowane's Hospital Trust began a major conservation project at the Hospital initially concentrating on the restoration of the historic fabric of the building with specialist conservation work being carried out on the statue of John Cowane, the stained glass windows, forecourt lanterns and inscribed stone panels. The roof, windows and doors are being repaired or renewed and the walls harled and lime washed. These works will be completed in December, 2019. The Patrons have now agreed to proceed with a second phase of improvement works focusing on the interior of the Hospital. The Hospital repairs are programmed for completion by late summer, 2020 when the fully restored venue will again be available for hire.

== See also ==
- Hospitals in medieval Scotland
