= Mitchell's Hospital Old Aberdeen =

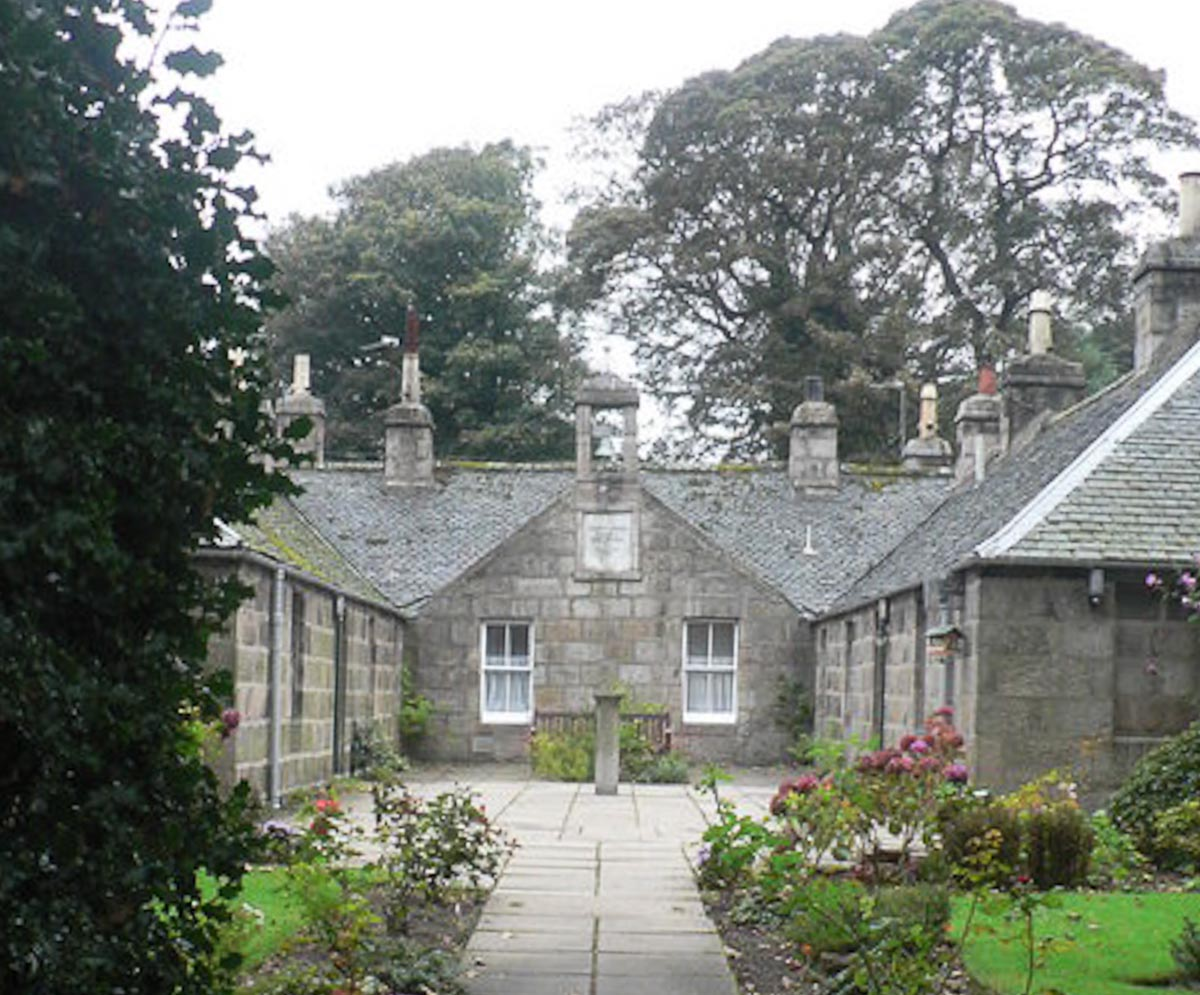
- Mitchell's Hospital 2012

- Shown in Aberdeen

Geography
- Location: Aberdeen, Scotland, United Kingdom
- Coordinates: 57.168819°N 2.1035680°W

Organisation
- Care system: Public NHS
- Type: General

History
- Founded: 1801
- Closed: 1924 (converted to flats)

Links
- Lists: Hospitals in Scotland

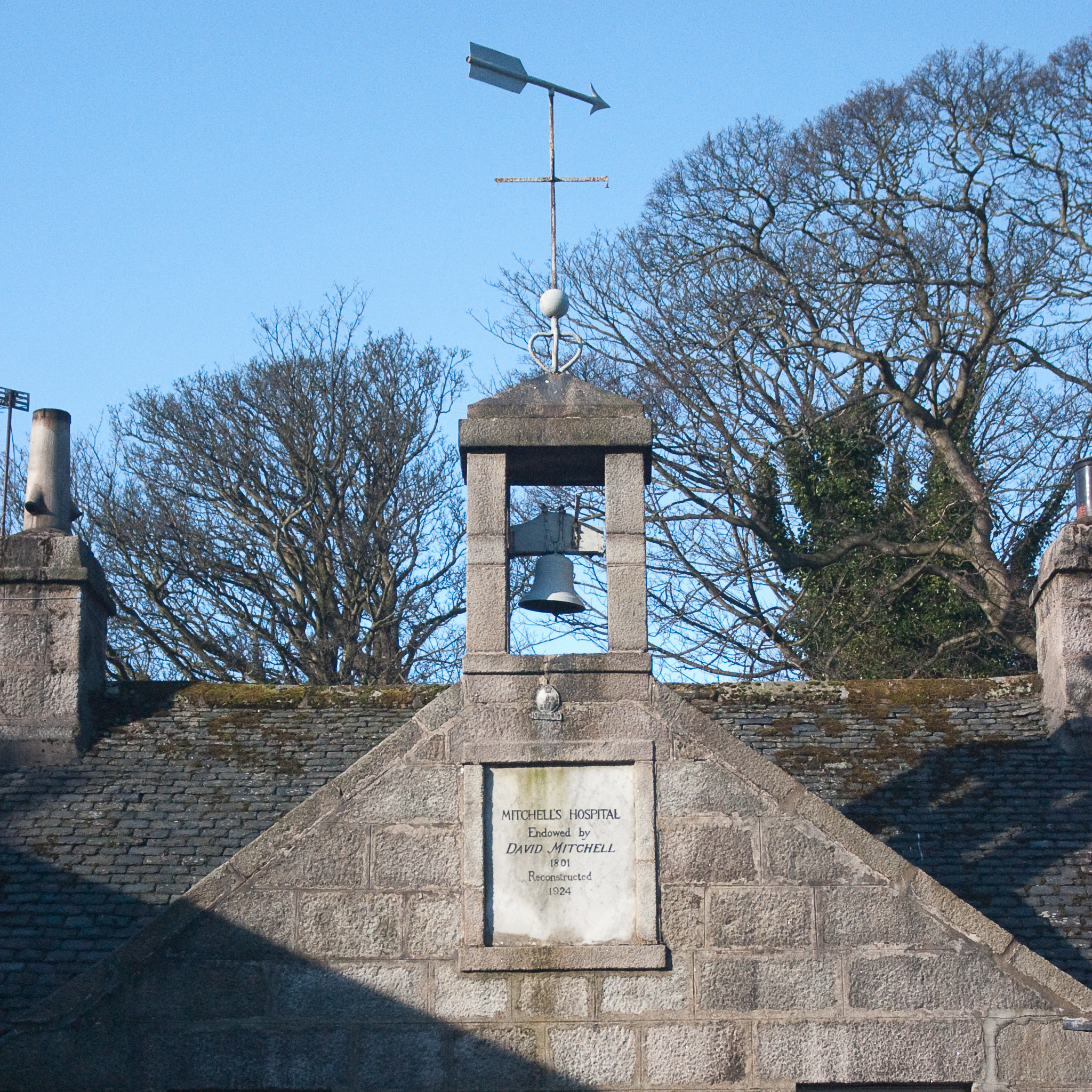
Mitchell's Hospital Bell Tower - foundation date and the date of the early Twentieth Century alterations

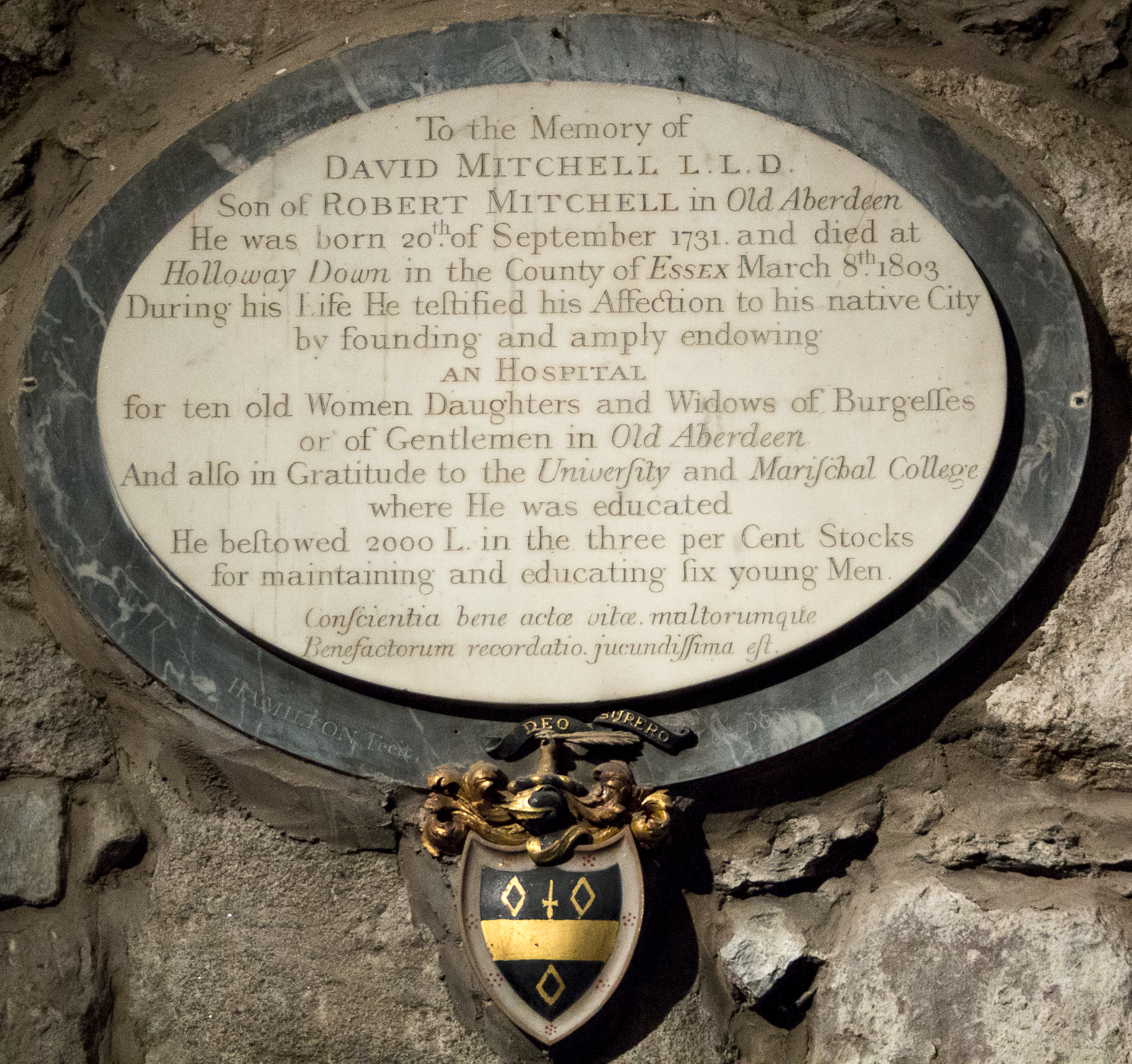
Plaque in The Cathedral Church of St Machar, Old Aberdeen commemorating David Mitchell.

Mitchell's Hospital, Old Aberdeen, in Old Aberdeen, Scotland, was founded by the philanthropist David Mitchell in 1801 as follows: " .. from a regard for the inhabitants of the city of Old Aberdeen and its ancient college and a desire in these severe times to provide lodging, maintenance and clothing for a few aged relicks and maiden daughters of decayed gentlemen merchants or trade burgesses of the said city.. ". See the text of the 1801 Mortification or the conditions of the endowment. The Hospital is owned and managed by the University of Aberdeen, Aberdeen City Council, and the Cathedral Church of St Machar in Old Aberdeen. The origins of the Hospital are due to various attempts by the Incorporated Trades and Merchants in Old Aberdeen to provide a "care home" for their elderly and infirm members and their "relicks".

From 1801 until the beginning of the twentieth century, the hospital served as a refuge for "relicks" of Old Aberdeen Trade Burgesses. Mitchell's mortification laid down very specific conditions for eligibility. One of which gave preference in selecting residents to those who had the name "Mitchell". Originally, the residents lived a communal life with a strict system of management and care. A Board of Management carried out Mitchell's wishes to the letter. The operation of the hospital has been modified twice in the twentieth century to provide self-contained flats for elderly ladies. However, the original mortification by Mitchell determines its overall operation - within twenty-first century financial constraints.

== History ==
=== David Mitchell ===
David Mitchell came from a large family in Old Aberdeen. He had nine brothers and sisters. There is a record of his baptism on 24 September 1731. His father was Robert Mitchell, possibly a vintner and his mother was Christian Forbes. He studied at Marischal College in Aberdeen from 1748, graduating in 1752. It appears that he was the only member of the family who studied at either Kings or Marischal Colleges. For almost fifty years very little more is known about him. It is not until he intimates his wishes to found as hospital in Old Aberdeen that any secure record for him occurs. It is likely he spent his life in Holloway Down in Essex and he owned what was then called Holloway Down Farm. The village of Holloway Down is now in the Leytonstone/Waltham Forrest district of London. It is probable that he was a Stock Broker. His other interests were in insurance and shipping. He was the owner of at least three ships that traded for the East India Company. Mitchell is recorded as investing £1,500, in 1797, to a Government "Loyalty Bond". His brother Alexander came to London and worked for the East India Company as a ship's purser on Mitchell's ships. Alexander died in 1788. It is probable that Alexander had a son called Alexander and one daughter. David Mitchell's sister Mary came to live in London. The only record of her time there appears in an obituary from 1807.

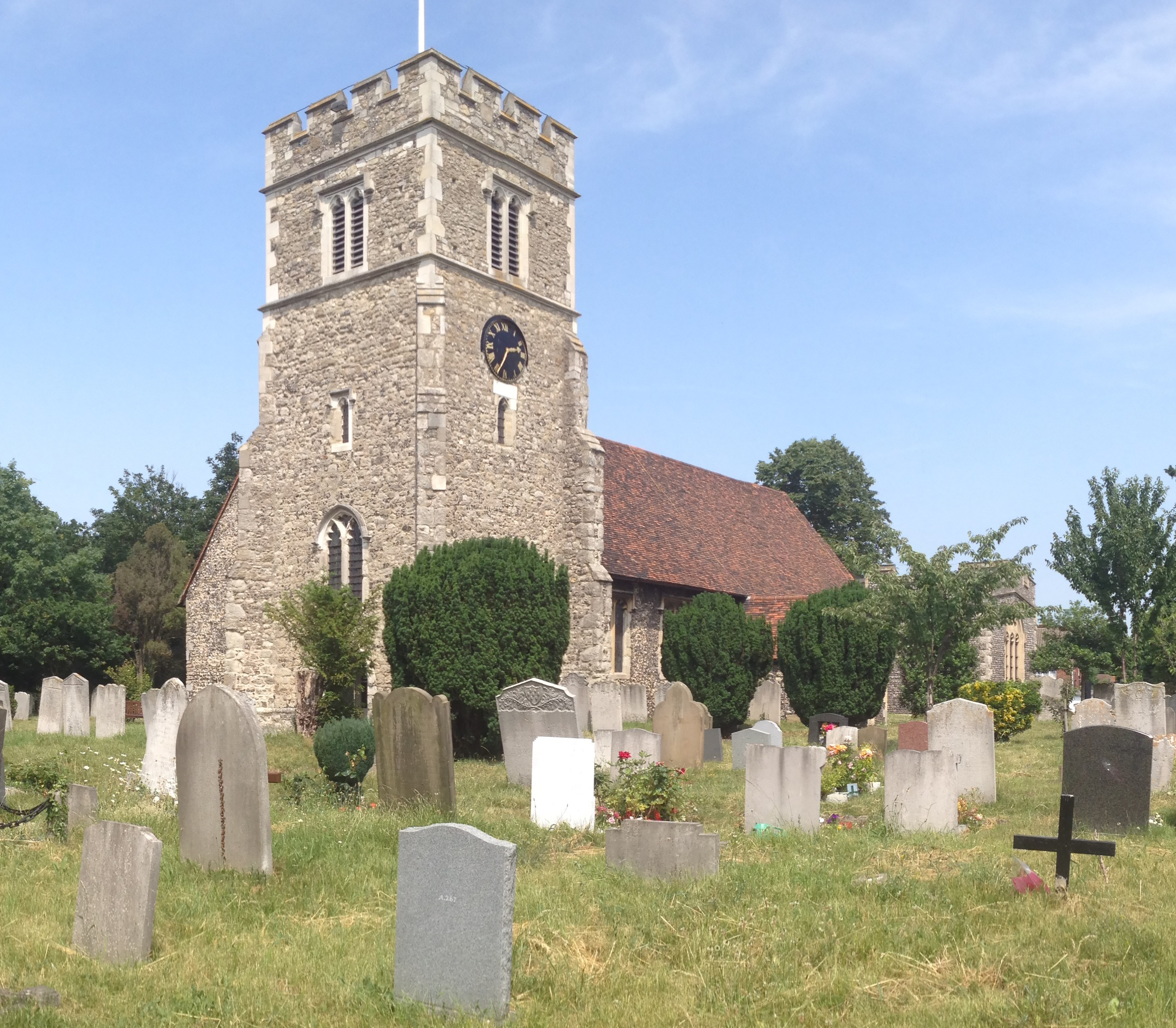
St Paulinus Church, Crayford Kent.

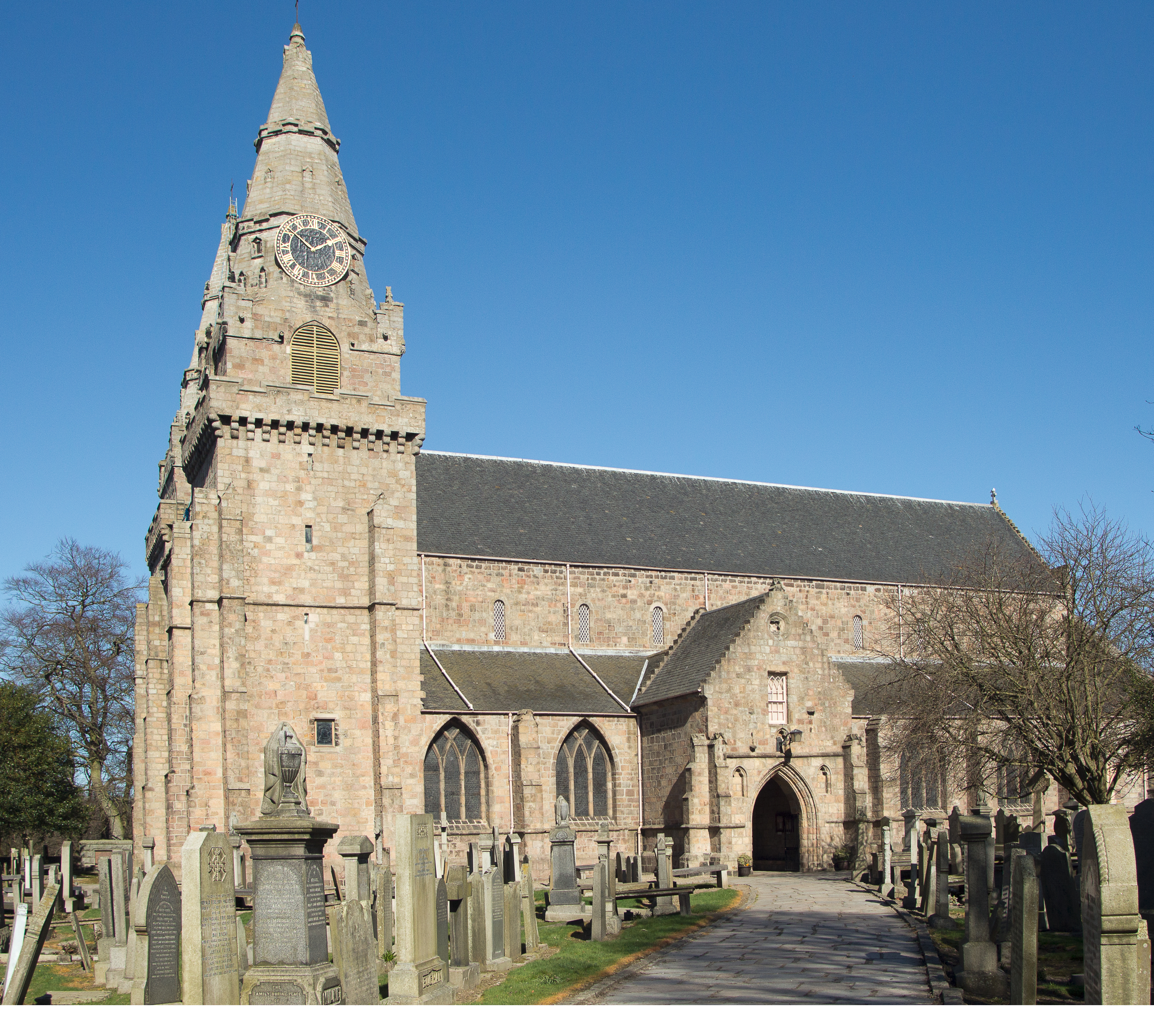
The Cathedral Church of St Machar, Old Aberdeen - - burial site for the Mitchell family (David, Alexander and Mary are buried in Crayford Kent)

Curiously David didn’t leave a will. A sense of his standing comes from a public notice by an administrator selling his farm lists the farm as follows:

'Lot 1 A very compact and desirable detached leasehold residence pleasantly situated on Holloway Down five miles from London on the road leading to Epping Forrest. The premises stand removed a short distance from the road with fore court; excellent pasture and kitchen gardens fully planted with fruit tress; and well cropped orchard and paddock; with comfortable cottage nearby adjoining; with coach house, stabling and lofts and various outbuildings, tack years etc.; well supplied with fine water comprising in the whole five acres with right of common.

Lot 2 A piece of copyhold land in front of the above on the opposite side of the road held of the Manor of Wanstead and Stonehall.

While he did not own a large estate, he appears to have had a very comfortable life as a gentleman bachelor. Before he endowed the hospital, he acquired a family coat of arms. It is not clear how this happened as he adopted the arms of Mitchell of Craigend in Stirlingshire. He was not given any rights to have his own. There is no known link between the Mitchell's of Old Aberdeen and the Stirlingshire family. It appears that David Mitchell adopted the Mitchell of Craigend coat of arms late in life – perhaps when he was thinking about his estate and legacy.

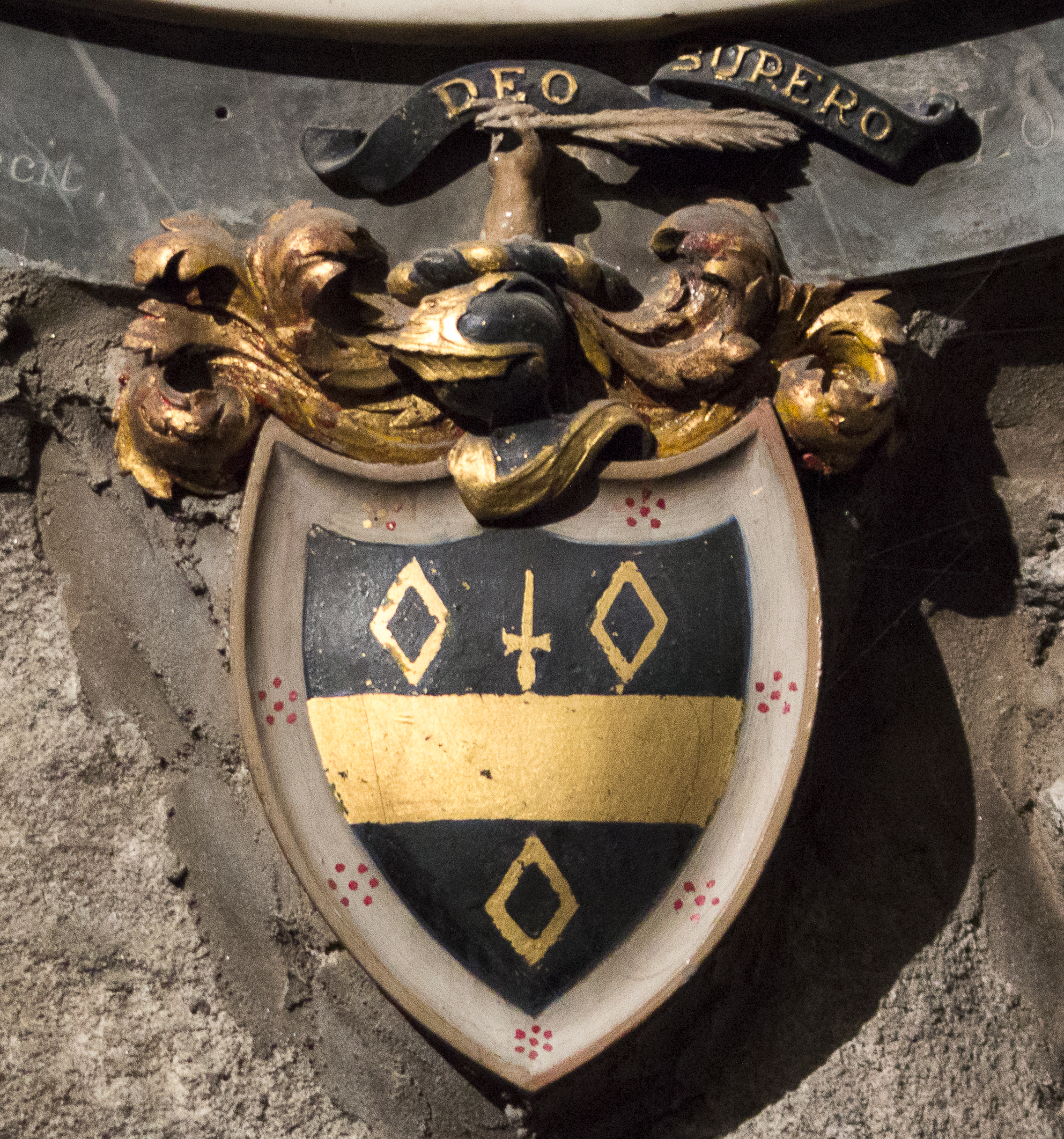
Mitchell's claimed Coat of Arms - Cathedral Church of St Machar, Old Aberdeen

A further act of Mitchell's generosity was the endowment of six studentships to Marischal College in 1801. As a result of his endowments of the Hospital and Marischal, he was elected a Burgess of Old Aberdeen and "new" Aberdeen and granted an honorary LL D degree from Marischal College in 1801.

=== Early Days of the Hospital ===
On or about 19 November 1800 the Principal of King's College Old Aberdeen, Dr. Roderick MacLeod, received a communication that ".. an unknown gentleman had an intention of founding and endowing an Hospital for the maintenance of 10 old women of this city ..…". This brief entry, in the records of Mitchell's Hospital Old Aberdeen, records the creation the "Auld Maids Hospital". While David Mitchell was ".. an unknown gentleman.." the proposal was warmly received. The College contacted the Merchant Society, the Magistrates and the Trades Council to seek support for "… founding and endowing an Hospital for the maintenance of ten old women of this city ..…". The residents were to be ".. five aged relicks and five maiden daughters of decayed gentlemen or merchants or trade burgesses… " William Jack, the Sub-Principal of Kings College reported that the Magistrates and Town Council of Old Aberdeen had agreed unanimously that land would be acquired and granted gratis to the College for use by a Hospital. James Stronach, Convener of the Trades Council said they prepared to contribute their share to have a hospital built. James Jaffrey, Clerk to the Merchants Society responded that the Society considered the matter to be of the highest importance and would an appoint members to a committee to further the build of a hospital. In a very short time the idea of a hospital for aged relicks and maiden daughters was turned into practice.

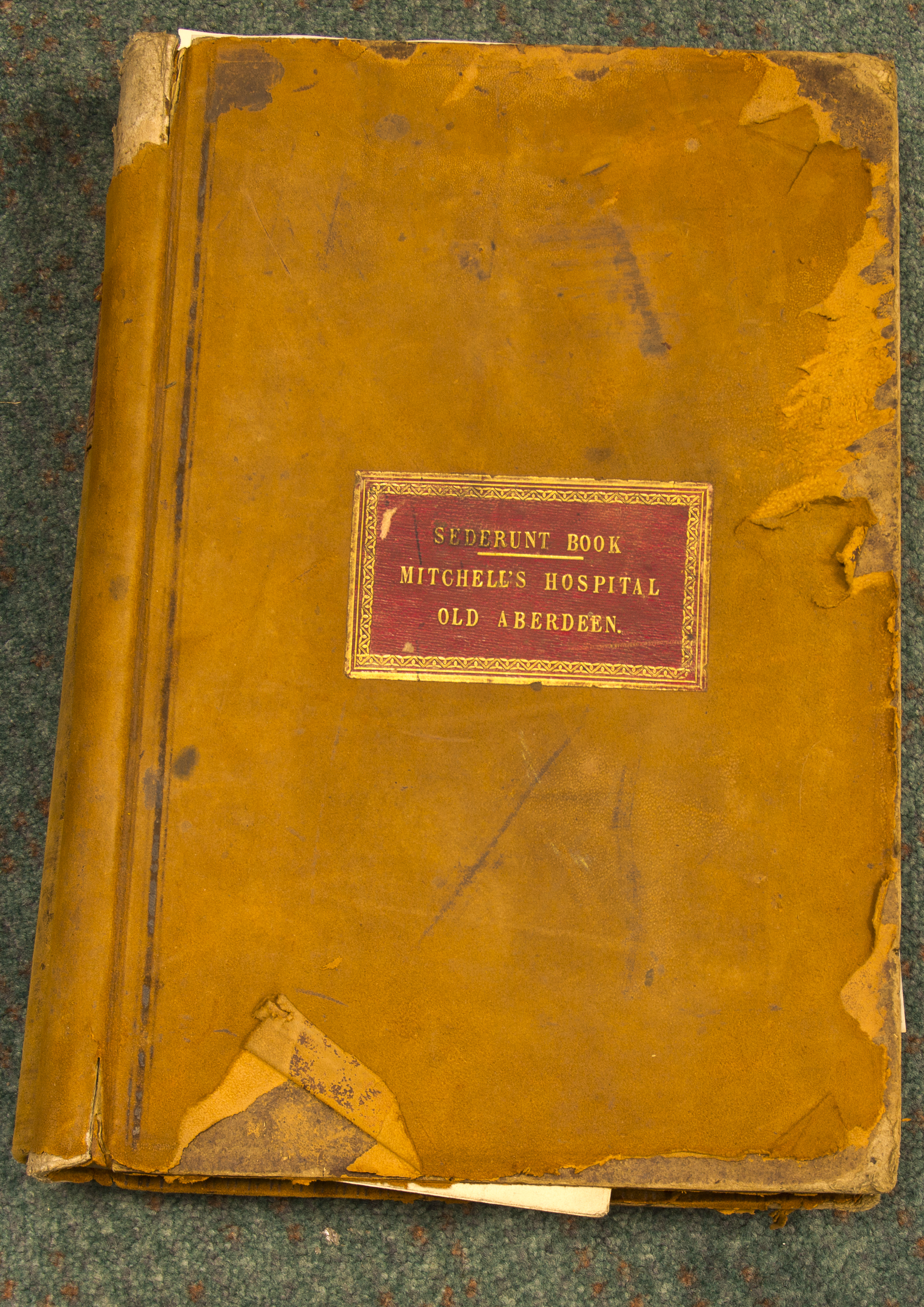
Part of the Mitchell's Archive - Sederunt Volume 1

Mitchell gave by Deed of Mortification dated 25 May 1801, the sum of £5500 consolidated 3% Government annuities for the purpose. Of the total sum the interest on £500 was to be allocated to repairs to the building. The hospital was " ".. for all time is to be called Mitchell's Hospital..". The Mortification was a very detailed document that determined how the hospital was to run, who were eligible for residence, what they were to wear and what type of food was to be provided. The selection of residents was very precisely drawn. The Mortification specified that the ladies had to be virtuous and of good moral character ".. of the names of Mitchell or Forbes in equal numbers...". In addition the residents were to wear " gowns of a deep blue colour.." resulting in residents being called " .. auld maids in blue gowns..". The issue of eligibility was an early problem for the Governors. Exceptions were made, in particular for a Christian Mitchell. This lady was not related to the Mitchell family but was a "name-daughter" after the founder's mother Christian Forbes. The Governors decided to make an exception for her but not to allow this to be a precedent for others. Along with the Mortification Mitchell executed on 19 August 1801 further detailed Regulations containing minute directions as to the management of the hospital, the admission, qualification, behaviour and even diet of the residents together with the appointment of a governess or matron and the duties of a board of Managers or Trustees.

The trustees were to be drawn from King's College, the Church of Old Machar, the town council of Old Aberdeen and the Trades Council. Nothing was left to chance. On 5 January 1802, the Trustees met and agreed an advert be placed in the Aberdeen Journal and on the principal gate of the hospital with an entry date set for the last Monday in January, 1802 The Governors met on the 23rd and 25th Of January and admitted nine women. Two of the applicants were rejected ".. though their moral character, age and indigence was fully ascertained.." because they could not provide proof of their husband's link to the Incorporated Trades. The state of one of those accepted, a Mary Weir, underscores the real need that was being met. A minute of the Governor's on 2 February 1802 records that she ".. came over from the new town in a cart, she being unable to walk on account of the poor state of her health..". By 20 May of that year, a Governess had been appointed after a detailed exchange of letters with the founder. Mitchell continued to take a keen interest from where he lived in London about the residents, the building, its insurance and its boundaries until he died in 1803. His immediate family became involved in providing for the ladies and the hospital's organization. Mitchell's nephew, Alexander Mitchell provided a large hand bell and a clock to alert residents to the time for meals and the closure of the doors at night time. His sister Mary was very insistent that a long wooden bench seat be provided in Old Machar Church for the ladies to occupy on Sundays. An unnamed brother provided a large marble table for the dining room. This involvement was to continue after Mitchell's death with marble tablets commemorating his generosity erected in the public room of the hospital and also in the Old Machar church. In addition, horn beakers with silver rims were given to the hospital which were used to issue drinks to the residents. These beakers were used by the "auld maids", the Governors, the Matron and visitors at an annual Founders Day celebration on 31 December each year.

=== 20th century ===
The facility was restored in 1924 and again in 1965 to provide self-contained flats for elderly ladies.

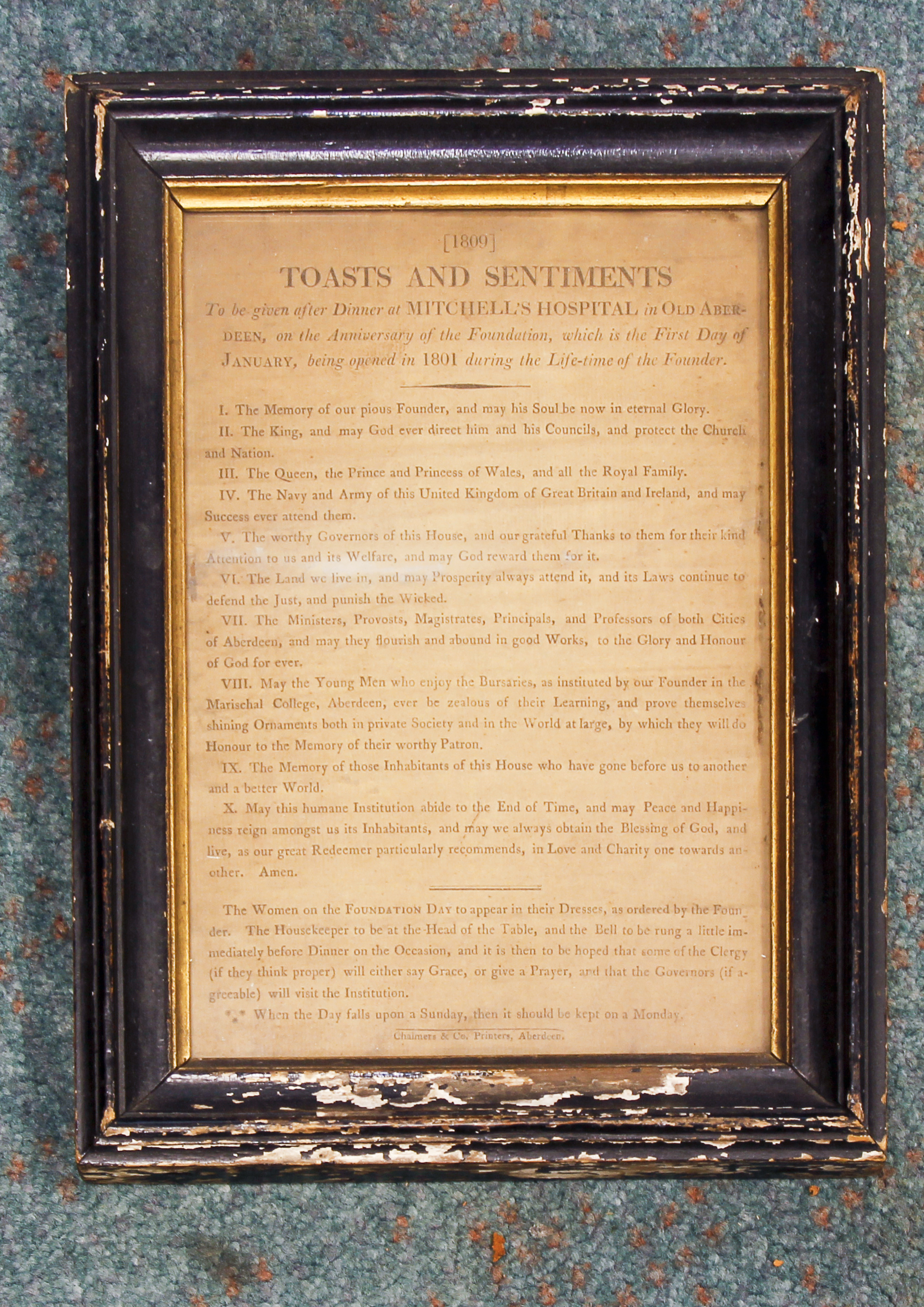
Toasts to be said at Founder's Dinner 31 December - each year.

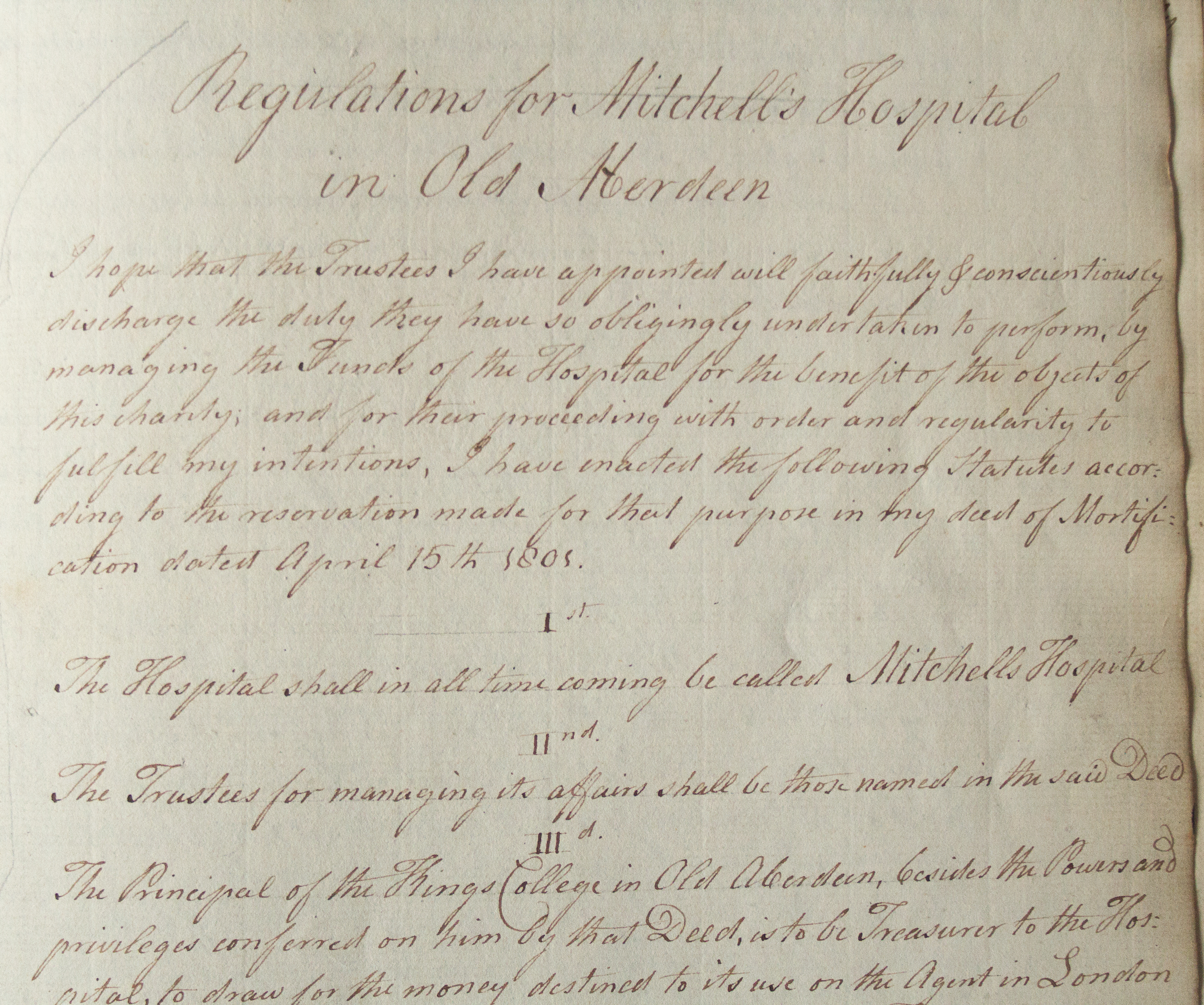
Mitchell's Hospital Excerpt from Rules and Regulations in 1801

== See also ==
- Beggar's badge
- Bishop Dunbar's Hospital
- Hospitals in medieval Scotland
- Kincardine O'Neil Hospital, Aberdeenshire
- Scottish Bedesmen
- Soutra Aisle
- Physic garden
- Provand's Lordship - the "physic" garden in Glasgow.

== Sources ==
- Anderson, P. J., New Spalding Club (Aberdeen Scotland), et al. (1898). Fasti academiae Mariscallanae Aberdonensis. Aberdeen, New Spalding Club.
- East India Company. and A. Farrington (1999). Catalogue of East India Company ships' journals and logs, 1600-1834. London, British Library.
- Farrington, A. and British Library. (2002). Trading places : the East India Company and Asia 1600-1834. London, British Library.
- Hackman, R. d. (2001). Ships of the East India Company. Gravesend, World Ship Society.
- Hardy, C. and East India Company. (1811). A register of ships employed in the service of the East India Company from 1760-1810. London,.
- Marischal College and University., P. J. Anderson, et al. (1889). Fasti Academiae Mariscallanae Aberdonensis : selections from the records of the Marischal College and University, MDXCIII-MDCCCLX. Aberdeen, Printed for the New Spalding Club.
- Maxwell, A. S. (1986). Monumental inscriptions, Old Machar churchyard, Aberdeen, Scotland. Aberdeen.
- Munro, A. M. (1899). Records of Old Aberdeen, 1157-1891. Aberdeen, New Spalding Club.
- Munro, A. M. and New Spalding Club (Aberdeen Scotland) (1899). Records of Old Aberdeen, MCLVII-MDCCCXCI (MCCCXCVIII-MCMIII) Vol. 2. Aberdeen, Printed for the New Spalding Club.
- Unknown (1800). A List of Brokers of the City of London at Michaelmas 1800. London, Henry Fenwick, 63 Snow Hill London.
