= Bede House, Old Aberdeen =

Seventeenth-century Scottish town house

Coordinates: 57°10′03″N 2°06′06″W

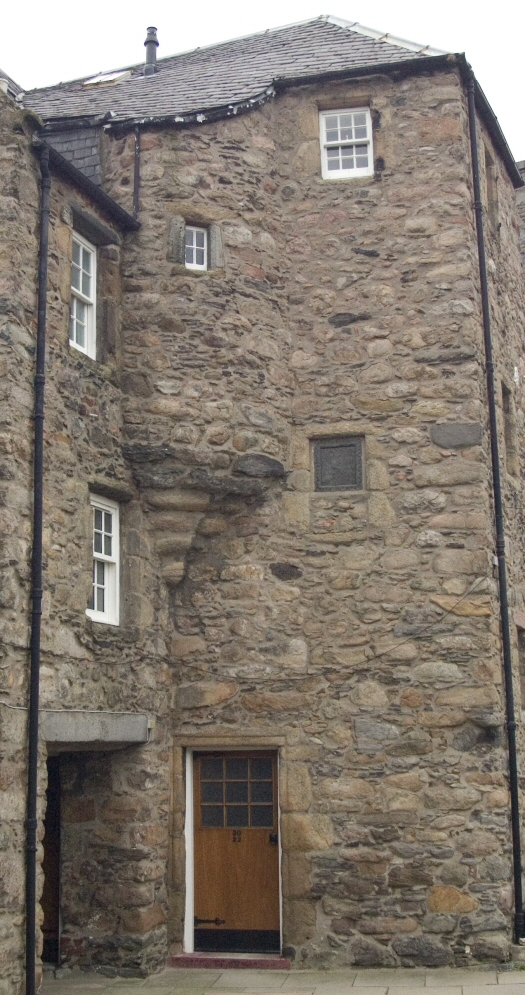
Bede House, Old Aberdeen, 1676

The Bede House in Old Aberdeen, Scotland, is a 17th-century Scottish town house. It was built in 1676 as a residence for Bailie William Logan and his wife Jean Moir of Stoneywood. During the late 18th century, Old Aberdeen Bedesmen moved from their original hospital beside St Machar's Church to the former Logan house in Don Street. In the 19th century the house changed hands. It was first owned by the Burgh of Old Aberdeen, then, by the City of Aberdeen after the merger of the two burghs in 1891. The house was refurbished by the City of Aberdeen Council in 1965. It was divided into two flats or apartments. The flats are now in private ownership. Much of the 17th-century building is in its original form. It is an excellent example of an L-shaped Scottish Town House, built on three floors with an attic. The house is designated as a Category A listed building.

== History ==
The story of a Bede House in Old Aberdeen starts in 1531 when Bishop Gavin Dunbar of St Machar's Cathedral, under the instruction of James V of Scotland, had built a hospital for the elderly poor in Old Aberdeen. The church of St Machar, founded in the 5th century, was a centre of community life in the area of Aberdeen immediately to the south of the river Don in what is now Seaton Park. The Bishop, whose predecessor William Elphinstone had helped found the University of Aberdeen, was a reforming cleric who took seriously his responsibilities to his flock. Such hospitals were not uncommon in medieval times with many in Scotland and England. There was another hospital, St Peters, just outside the 16th-century settlement in Aberdeen. These houses acted as refuges for elderly men.

In 1676, a Bailie of Old Aberdeen, William Logan, married Jean Moir of Stoneywood and as a senior member of the burgh they had built a town house on a plot of land on the East side of Don Street. The plot was based on an existing croft of 40 roods on the east side of Don Street leading from Old Aberdeen to the Brig O’ Balgownie. Don Street was the main artery north out of Aberdeen heading north past the St Peter's hospital and Old Kirkyard along what is now called the Spital and past the King's College of what is now the University of Aberdeen. Bailie Logan and his wife lived in their house until he died in 1680. Jean Moir continued to live there until her death in 1700. They are both buried in St Machar's Cathedral. By 1786, the old Bede House, adjacent to St Machar's Church, was in disrepair and the owner of the land, James Forbes-Seaton, negotiated a move of the Bedesmen to the house in Don Street. This house, has been known since as The Bede House, Old Aberdeen. Recent developments around the property also use the name – e.g. Bede Court. Bedesmen lived in Don Street for a short period. However, by the early 20th century the building needed repairs. After the union of Old Aberdeen and Aberdeen burghs in 1891, the City Council of Aberdeen used the Bede House as rented accommodation. In 1965, a complete refurbishment of the building was undertaken and two modern style flats or apartments created. The City retained its ownership until the tenants exercised their right to buy under local government legislation in the nineteen eighties. The properties remain in private ownership.

== Building ==
The Bede House is described in a few written accounts. It is recalled by Roger (1902) as "a good specimen of a seventeenth century Scottish Town House". The original house consisted of three stories and an attic. Entry to the house from Don Street is through a "pend" or alleyway leading to two doors. To the left is access to what is now cellars, the second door opens into a spiral stone staircase leading to the upper floors. The pend has a gate dating from 1965. The tower at the rear, which is capped with a pyramidal roof, carries the stairs to the second floor. From the second floor to the attic there is a set of stairs with a corbelled turret. These stairs are now closed off but can be accessed through a bedroom from one of the flats. The first floor would have been a "great hall" in Logan's time. A plaque commemorating William Logan and Janet Moir is attached to the square tower above and to the right of the door. It reads

GULLIELM LOGAN ET EIUS CONIX JANETA MOIR HANC DOM ..... AEDIFICARl JUSSERUNT ANNO DOMINE 1676

In English, "William Logan and his wife had the house built to their orders in the year 1676". Early prints show the house (probably in the 18th century) as having a building attached at right angles to the main building accessible from the courtyard to the rear. No records exist to confirm that there was a substantial building attached. The remains of the wooden roof beam are still visible. It is likely that some of the closed off arches along the internal stairway from the ground floor to the first floor, led into this building. To the right of the square tower was a chimney, again no longer present. However, bricks can be seen high in the wall of the tower indicating the chimney's location. The remnants of a beam forming the roof of the outbuilding are also visible, high in the wall of the house to the right of the square tower. Adjacent to the Bede House on Don Street nearer the university is a low two story building. There is evidence that this house was built from stones from the central tower at St Machar's Cathedral that fell in a storm in 1688.

== Scottish Bedesmen ==
The earliest account of Bedesmen across Scotland comes from the reign of James VI, in 1607. While there had been Bedesmen in Old Aberdeen since 1531, the practice of a community supporting the "puir" does not appear to be widespread. In an 1885 book, the following record from 1607 highlights the dress of the Bedesmen and their prayerful approach to life.

June 2
The Privy Council refer to "a very ancient and loveable custom" of giving a blue gown, purse and as many Scottish shillings as agreed with the years of the King's age, to men "auld puir men" as likewise agreed with the king's years and seeing it to be "very necessary and expedient that the said custom should continuit" they gave orders accordingly.
The "auld puir men" so favoured were called the King's Bedesmen, notwithstanding any general enactments that might exist against mendicancy. Their blue cloak bore a pewter badge which assured them this right. They were expected to requite the king's bounty by their prayers; and, doubtless as they had such an interest in the increase of his years, their intercessions for his prolonged life must have been sincere. The distribution of the cloaks and purses used to take place on the king's birthday, at the end of the Toolbooth of Edinburgh, till a time not long gone by.

Although there are many fine examples of "beggars'" badges, there is no evidence that all Bedesmen had a badge. Examples of beggars' badges in the National Museum in Edinburgh, include an 1857 "King's Bedesman or Blue Gown Badge".

Recent evidence suggests that Old Aberdeen Bedesmen may have been called "Blue Coats". In the minutes of the Kirk Session of St Machar's Cathedral Church, for 11 February 1644, a Johone Gordone was given 6 shillings. He is referred to as "ane kings beidsmen". On 8 December of that year, 1644, he is awarded 12 shillings. In this entry in the Kirk Session records, he is referred to as "ane poor man and "ane blue gowne". This is compelling evidence to suggest that the Dunbar Hospital Bedesmen were referred to as Blue Gowns. The implication, is that they may have worn a blue cloak and may have had a badge to identify their position. See beggar's badge.

== Aberdeen Bedesmen ==
The Bedesmen were almsmen who received support from the local community. In Old Aberdeen, the main pillars of the community were the church, the Church of St Machar also now known as St Machar's Cathedral, and the Town Council. Latterly, the Principal of the university and the Minister of St Machar's Cathedral have until recently acted as a committee to ensure the Bedesmen were looked after. In an article in the local press in 1968, Cuthbert Graham claims the Bedesmen only lived in the house for a few decades. The article contains an account describing the existence of the Bedesmen that is very similar to an account of the Bede House of Higham Ferrers. The foundation charter of Bishop Dunbar's Hospital, dated 24 February 1531, relates that Bishop Dunbar claimed "when something is left after supplying the needs of the church and our own life, and remembering the words of Almighty God, ... give of they bread to the hungry and the poor and the wandering under the shelter of the house and clothe the naked we resolve to make a hospital". The drawing by Andrew Gibb gives a clear impression of the structure. In Aberdeen the men lived in separate rooms each 14 ft. long and 12 ft. broad in a building some 100 ft. long and 32 ft. wide. On the north side of the house was a common room and on the south side an oratory. There was a wooden bell tower and a bell. The men were to be maintained out of the revenue of the burgh of Old Aberdeen the sum of £100 (Scots) – roughly equal to £8 in modern currency. In the 16th century the men rose at 7 a.m. on the call of the Janitor – one of the Bedesmen – and they went to pray in St Machar's Cathedral. They dined at 11 a.m. The day proceeded with prayers; work in the gardens and a supper at 6 p.m. So the day continued with prayers and "good conversation" until 3 a.m. the next day with a strict instruction from Dunbar that "at all times they should be seemly in conversation and not in any manner whatever receive women into their apartments". Praying was central to their existence. By the 1860s a sum of 8 shillings a month was given to the Bedesmen. The number of Bedesmen had increased from 12 to 16 by 1902. The eldest two were also given two salmon from the River Don. In the late nineteen sixties, there were only eight Bedesmen each receiving 15 shillings or £0.75 from the Church Officer of St Machar on the last Thursday of each month. (See Latterly the monies received by the Church were insufficient to support a payment to the Bedesmen and residual funds were amalgamated with other Poor Relief funds.

The most recent and probably only picture of the Bedesmen shows eleven gentlemen in formal suits greeting Queen Mary on a visit to St Machar's Cathedral Aberdeen on 12 September 1922. Katherine Trail calls them Royal Bedesmen. The last Bedesman died in 1988. See also...Beadsman

== Bedesmen, beggars and pilgrims ==
There are doubts about the relationship between Bedesmen, beggars and Pilgrims. There are many fine examples of beggars' badges and there is evidence that Royal Bedesmen had an identifying badge. This badge would carry the motto "Pass and Re-Pass" to indicate that they were permitted to move from community to community. Travellers and Pilgrims often had a badge to identify them as bone fide.The shell badge is an example. It is open to question if bedesmen in general had any identifying garment or badge.

== Secret passages ==
Andrew Cluer recounts the story of a recent "secret" passage. It is claimed that this blocked-off passage leads from the Bede House to the cathedral. This is a distance of some 500 metres. The book goes on to relate that "the Beadle (of St. Machar's) used to buy the minister booze, at the grocer's shop by the Town House and smuggle a "carry out" into St. Machar's". Cluer also reports that "evidence" of this was the bottles found in the secret passage when it could be walked "in living memory". There is a similar interesting story about a "secret passage" from the adjacent Spital (Number 45) to St. Peter's Cemetery. The Spital (See) form part of the road from Don Street, through the High Street into Aberdeen. Number 45 Spital was a leper hospital and a secret passage leading directly to the cemetery of St Peter's Church. The passage story is disputed by Diane Morgan. The similarity of the stories is coincidental – but it does indicate the way many local inhabitants built links between buildings, people and unlikely circumstances. As evidence of this one of the recent residents in the Bede House also believed there was a passage from the Bede House to St Machar's Cathedral. He claimed to have seen it when the houses were being renovated in 1965. There is no evidence to support this claim.

== See also ==
- Beadsman
- Soutra Aisle
- Kincardine O'Neil Hospital, Aberdeenshire
- Mitchell's Hospital Old Aberdeen
- Chantry
- Hospitals in medieval Scotland
