= Sena II =

King of Anuradhapura

Sena II දෙවන සේන
- Maharaja; Sirisangboyi Mapurmuka; Abhā Siri Saṅg-bo
- Kongollava Pillar Inscription of Sena II

King of Anuradhapura
- Reign: 853 – 887
- Predecessor: Sena I
- Successor: Udaya II
- Spouse: Mahesi Sanghā
- Issue: Kassapa V
Names
- Sena; Mugayin-väsi Sen; Siri Ganga bo Sirisambo
- Dynasty: House of Lambakanna II
- Father: Adipāda Kassapa
- Religion: Theravada Buddhism

Sena II (Sinhala: දෙවන සේන) was a king of the Anuradhapura Kingdom who reigned 853–887 CE in Sri Lanka belonging to the Moriya clan of the Lambakanna dynasty, who ascended the throne upon the death of his uncle, Sena I. His thirty-four-year reign was distinguished by disputed overseas military campaigns as well as significant patronage of Buddhist institutions within the kingdom. Sena II launched an expedition against the Pandya kingdom in South India. As per Culawamsa, In 862 CE, his general, Senpathi Kutthaka, captured and plundered the Pandya capital of Madurai, installed Varuguna II as a ruler, and recovered royal treasures that had been seized during earlier invasions. The Pandyan side of the evidence makes the ruling king Srimara Srivallabha successful in repelling a Maya Pandya and Sinhalese forces thus keeping his throne to himself at the end of the struggle.

== Early Life and Ascension to the throne ==
=== Family Background ===
Sena II, who reigned as king of Anuradhapura from 853 to 887 CE, was the son of Adipāda Kassapa, a prominent nobleman and brother of King Sena I. As the nephew of his immediate predecessor, his accession reflected the continuation of dynastic succession within the ruling royal lineage.

Sena II married Sanghā (sometimes spelled as Samgha), the eldest daughter of Kittaggabodhi, the former ruler of Rohana, and elevated her to the rank of Mahesi. The marriage served to reinforce political ties between the royal court at Anuradhapura and the southern province.

=== Rise to Power ===
King Sena I of the Anuradhapura kingdom died in 853 CE following a reign characterised by defensive conflicts against repeated South Indian incursions. His death was followed by a smooth transfer of authority to his nephew, Sena II, whose accession reflected established dynastic succession within the Lambakanna lineage. As Sena I’s brothers had predeceased him, potential claimants from that branch of the royal family had already been eliminated, facilitating an uncontested succession.

Before ascending the throne, Sena II held the office of Mahādipāda, a senior military command under the administration of his uncle. This position likely strengthened his standing within the royal court and provided administrative and military experience that prepared him for kingship. Chronicles record no major factional disputes or palace intrigues following Sena I’s death, allowing Sena II to assume power without significant opposition.

The political circumstances surrounding his accession were marked by instability within the Anuradhapura Kingdom, largely owing to continued pressure from South Indian powers, particularly the Pandya Dynasty. During the reign of Sena I, the Pandyan ruler Śrīmāra Śrīvallabha had invaded Sri Lanka in the 840s CE, sacking Anuradhapura, killing several members of the royal family including Sena II’s father, Adipāda Kassapa and carrying off sacred and royal treasures. These events left the kingdom weakened and strongly influenced the defensive and retaliatory priorities of Sena II’s early reign.

== Reign and Administration ==
=== Domestic policies ===
Sena II ascended the throne in 853 CE following the death of his uncle, Sena I, inheriting a kingdom recovering from foreign invasions and internal tensions within the Lambakanna dynasty. His reign, which lasted until 887 CE, is described in the Cūḷavaṃsa as a period of relative domestic stability, marked by the absence of major rebellions or political upheavals. This stability has been attributed to his careful administration and efforts to consolidate royal authority through the maintenance of loyalty among provincial governors and senior officials, thereby strengthening centralized control over Anuradhapura and its surrounding territories. No recorded challenges to either his accession or his rule are noted in Cūḷavaṃsa.

In support of social and economic recovery, Sena II is credited with implementing welfare measures intended to alleviate hardship and promote social cohesion. According to the Cūḷavaṃsa, these included regular almsgiving and the annual distribution of garments to members of the Buddhist Saṅgha as well as to the poor. Such acts of royal generosity reinforced his image as a benevolent ruler and contributed to internal stability following decades of disruption. Although contemporary sources do not describe specific taxation reforms or commercial regulations, the absence of recorded economic unrest during his reign suggests effective fiscal management sufficient to sustain these charitable initiatives.

Administrative policy under Sena II emphasized centralization through the appointment of trusted officials to oversee important districts, continuing earlier efforts toward political consolidation associated with the reign of Sena I. Epigraphic evidence from the period reflects the continued stability of the Lambakanna dynasty, allowing the king to focus primarily on governance and reconstruction rather than internal conflict. This environment of domestic peace provided the foundation for extensive public works and religious patronage undertaken during his reign.

=== Irrigation and public works ===
Sena II undertook the restoration and maintenance of irrigation infrastructure in Sri Lanka’s Dry Zone, particularly in the vicinity of Anuradhapura, where earlier Pandyan invasions had caused significant damage. His initiatives focused largely on repairing existing reservoirs and canals in order to revive agricultural productivity in a region dependent on managed water systems for rice cultivation. Among the works attributed to his reign was the restoration of the Minipe Ela irrigation system near Nachchaduwa, an important canal network that distributed water from major reservoirs to surrounding agricultural lands.

The king also supervised the maintenance and possible improvement of tanks in the Mahiyangana region, contributing to the wider hydraulic network that sustained the kingdom’s agrarian economy. An inscription dating to his reign records administrative arrangements concerning the Mahidavava tank (identified with modern Mamaduwa), located approximately 65 kilometres north of Anuradhapura, which supported irrigation grants and local farming communities. Although large-scale new constructions are not prominently recorded, these restoration efforts followed the long-standing Sinhalese tradition of adaptive hydraulic engineering described in historical chronicles such as the Mahāvaṃsa.

The rehabilitation of irrigation systems strengthened agricultural output and reduced the risk of famine by ensuring a reliable water supply during seasonal droughts. By restoring damaged infrastructure, Sena II helped stabilise food production and sustain population recovery in the Dry Zone following the disruptions caused by earlier invasions.

=== Religious patronage ===
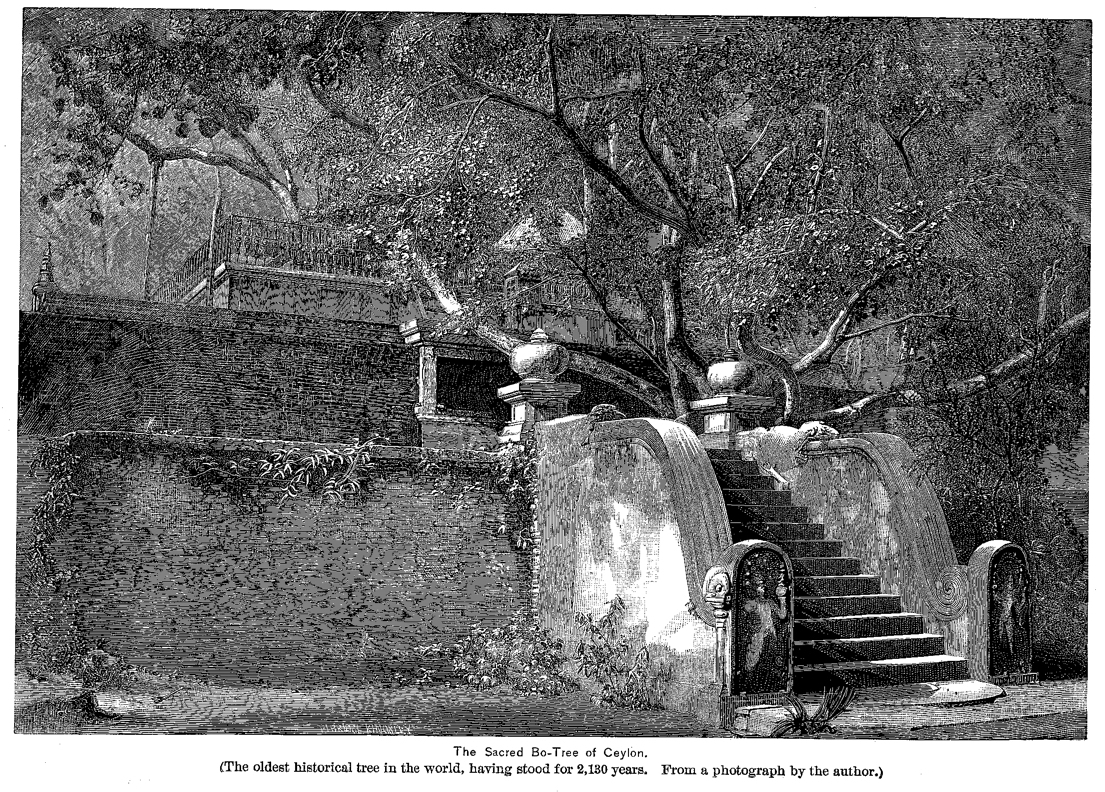
The Jaya Sri Maha Bodhi.

The reign of Sena II is associated with a revival of Buddhist religious life in the Anuradhapura Kingdom after the disruptions caused by Pandyan incursions in the preceding decades. According to the Cūḷavaṃsa, he sought to restore unity within the Buddhist Saṅgha by assembling the monastic community and enforcing disciplinary regulations impartially in order to distinguish legitimate ascetics and ensure institutional stability. He is also credited with reviving religious festivals and ceremonial observances, including a grand procession honouring the Sacred Tooth Relic, which symbolised both the restoration of Theravāda Buddhist traditions and the reaffirmation of royal legitimacy. The chronicle describes the king personally participating in the ceremony, riding his state elephant amid elaborate ritual observances.

Sena II undertook extensive restoration and endowment of major Buddhist institutions in Anuradhapura. He repaired the Lohamahāpāsāda, the multi-storeyed monastic complex within the Mahāvihāra precinct, and restored the sacred golden Buddha image which was previously looted during the Pandyan invasion under Sena I to the Ratanapāsāda pavilion. These acts contributed to the preservation of important architectural and artistic monuments while revitalising religious centres that had suffered neglect and damage. He also established a hospital at the Mihintale monastery, an important site in the early history of Sri Lanka, providing medical care for the resident monastic community. The Cūḷavaṃsa and Pūjāvaliya portray these undertakings as expressions of royal piety that strengthened Buddhist institutions.

Royal patronage further extended through grants and infrastructure supporting monasteries throughout the kingdom. Sena II is credited with expanding the Minipe dam on the Mahaveli Ganga and constructing an extensive feeder canal linking it to the Mahakaṇḍarava Wewa reservoir near Mihintale, thereby supporting agricultural lands associated with temple endowments. He also created a regulated water outlet for the Minneriya Wewa reservoir, benefiting regional monastic economies. These projects, recorded in later chronicles such as the Rājāvaliya and supported by modern scholarship, demonstrate the integration of hydraulic development with religious patronage. Contemporary sources also emphasise the king’s personal devotion, including frequent almsgiving to the Saṅgha and charitable assistance to the needy.

== Military Campaigns ==
In 862 CE, King Sena II of Anuradhapura launched a large-scale retaliatory expedition against the Pandya kingdom of South India in response to earlier Pandya invasions carried out during the reign of his predecessor, Sena I. Those attacks had culminated in the sack of Anuradhapura and the seizure of royal treasures, including a revered golden Buddha image. The campaign was also influenced by the arrival in Sri Lanka of Varaguna II, the son of the reigning Pandya monarch Śrīmāra Śrīvallabha (r. 815–862 CE), who sought military support after suffering ill treatment from his father. Sena II further strengthened his position by forming a coalition with the Pallava king Nriputungavarman (also known as Nriputunga I).

Preparing for the invasion, Sena II assembled a substantial expeditionary force composed of both naval and land units at the port of Mahātittha (modern Manthai) on Sri Lanka’s northwestern coast. Command of the campaign was entrusted to his loyal general Kutthaka, identified in inscriptions as Senevirad Kuttha. According to culawamsa, After successfully landing on the Pandya coastline despite potential hazards, taking advantage of the Pandya kingdom’s weakened condition following conflicts with the Pallavas, the Sinhalese army besieged Madurai. During the assault, Śrīmāra Śrīvallabha was severely wounded and reportedly died as per culawamsa while attempting to escape the city. Kutthaka’s forces captured and plundered Madurai, recovering treasures looted from Sri Lanka two decades earlier, including the sacred golden Buddha image, ceremonial victory drums, and a jeweled royal goblet. Additional wealth was seized, enhancing Anuradhapura’s prestige and resources.The expeditionary campaign ends with the enthronement of Varaguna II as the new Pandya king. Kutthaka returns to Anuradhapura with the treasures taken by the Pandyas during their earlier invasion.

The Pandyan side of the evidence makes the ruling king Srimara Srivallabha successful in repelling a Maya Pandya and Sinhalese forces thus keeping his throne to himself at the end of the struggle.

The Sinhalese sources and Pandyan sources vary with each other, as according to K. A. Nilakanta Sastri and other historians, Srimara Srivallabha successful in repelling Maya Pandya and Sinhalese forces and thus keeping his throne to himself at the end of the struggle. The Sinnamanur Plates from Tirukkalar records this as Pandyan victory.

Contemporary records such as the Iluppakaniya pillar inscription honors Sena II during the reign (20th regnal year) with the title Madhurā-dunu (“Conqueror of Madhurā”). Contemporary South Indian records says this as Pandyan victory.

== Works of Sena II ==
=== Religious ===
As mentioned in chronicles such as Culavamsa, Sena II has contributed to the development of Buddhist monasteries throughout the country as follows and besides the above-mentioned places, Sena II has developed a number of religious establishments which are not identified today;

1) Abhayagiriya: Restored the image house and his Mahesi Sangha placed a dark-blue diadem on the image.

2) Buddhagama Viharaya: Endowed to monks.

3) Jetavanaramaya: Added a Bodhisattva image to Manimevula Pasada.

4) Lovamahapaya: Restored Lohapasada

5) Mahasena Viharaya: Made a grant.

6) Mahiyanganaya: Donated a maintenance village to the Viharaya.

7) Medirigiriya: Granted villages to the Viharaya.

8) Ratnaprasada: Restored the building ransacked by the Pandyans.

9) Sobbha Viharaya: Built an image house.

10) Sri Maha Bodhi: Restored the trench and his Yuvaraja Mahinda (the brother of Sena II) built a Bodhi house.

11) Thuparamaya: Developed the Stupa.

12) Uttara Mula: Added a Pasada.

=== Social ===
Some of the social works carried out by Sena II are given below;

1) Kanavapi: Built a dam at Katthantanagara to augment the supply to the Kanavapi tank.

2) Mihintale: Established the famous Mihintale Hospital Complex.

3) Mahakanadarawa Wewa: Built a feeder canal.

4) Manimekhala Dam: Probably restored.

5) Minneriya Reservoir: Added a sluice.

== Images of works of Sena II ==
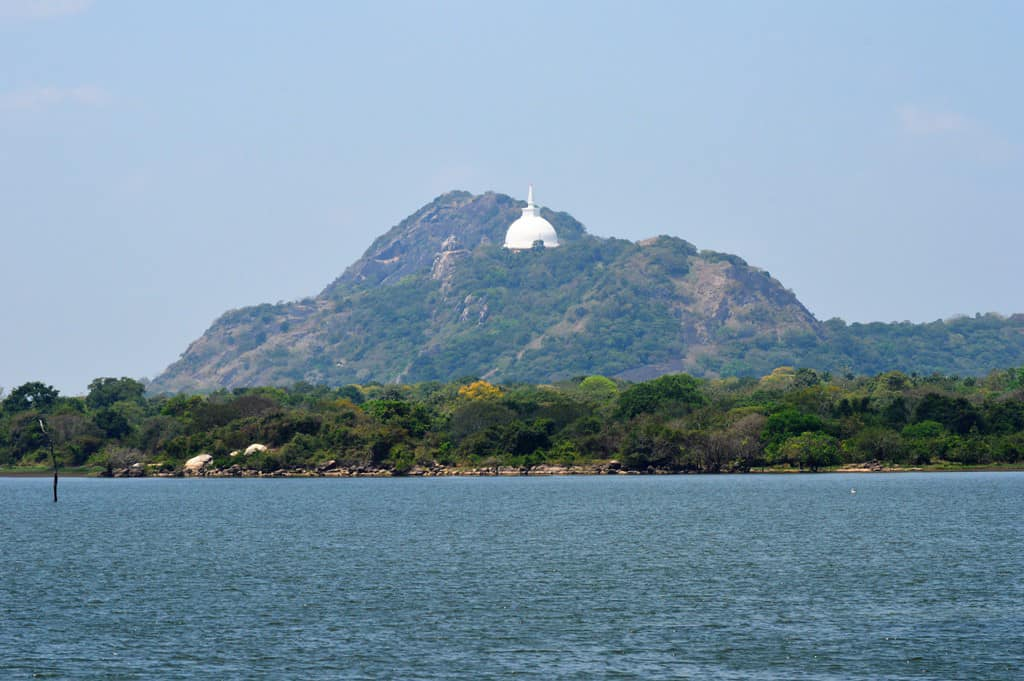
Mahakanadarawa Wewa

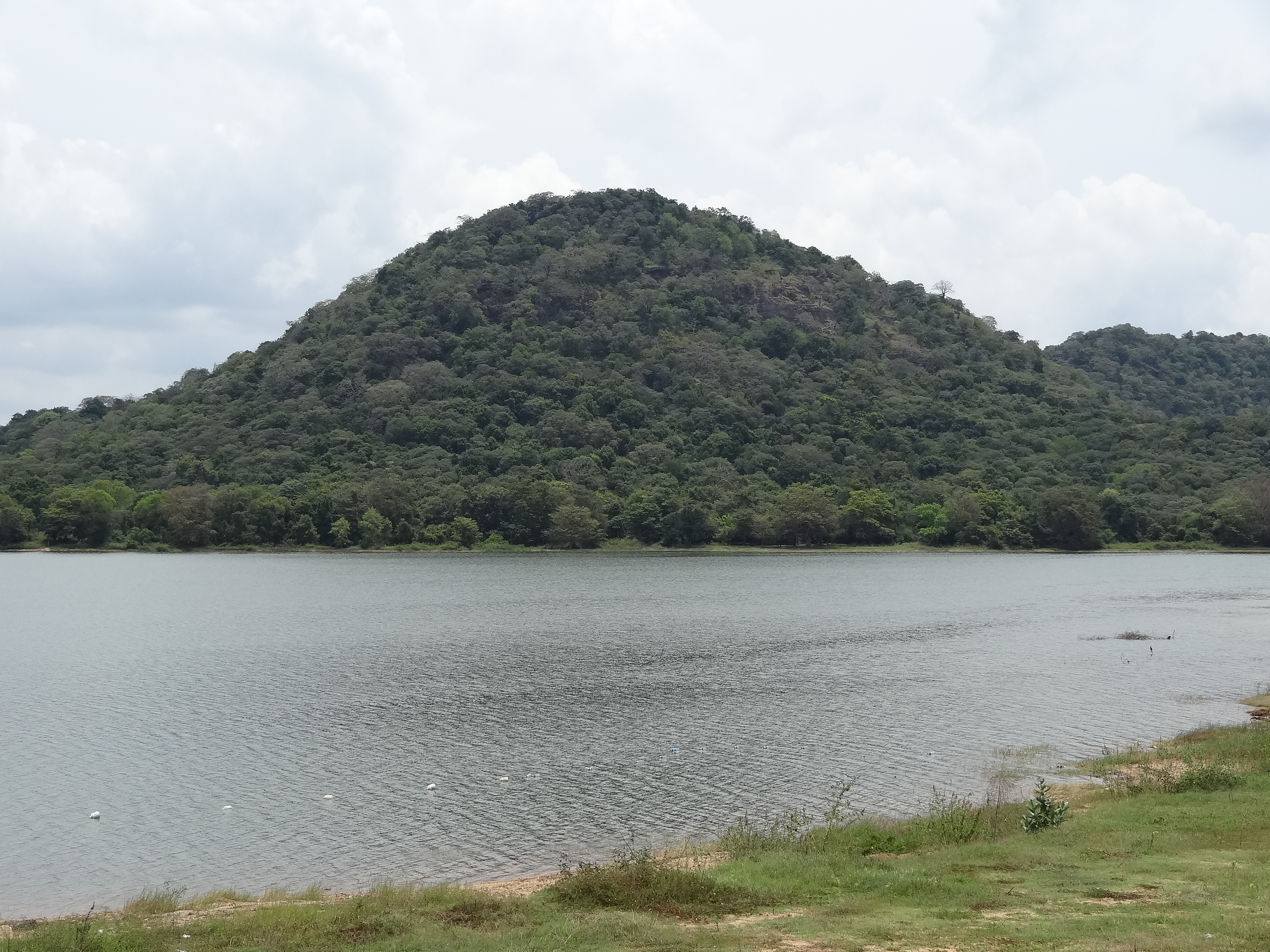
Minneriya Tank

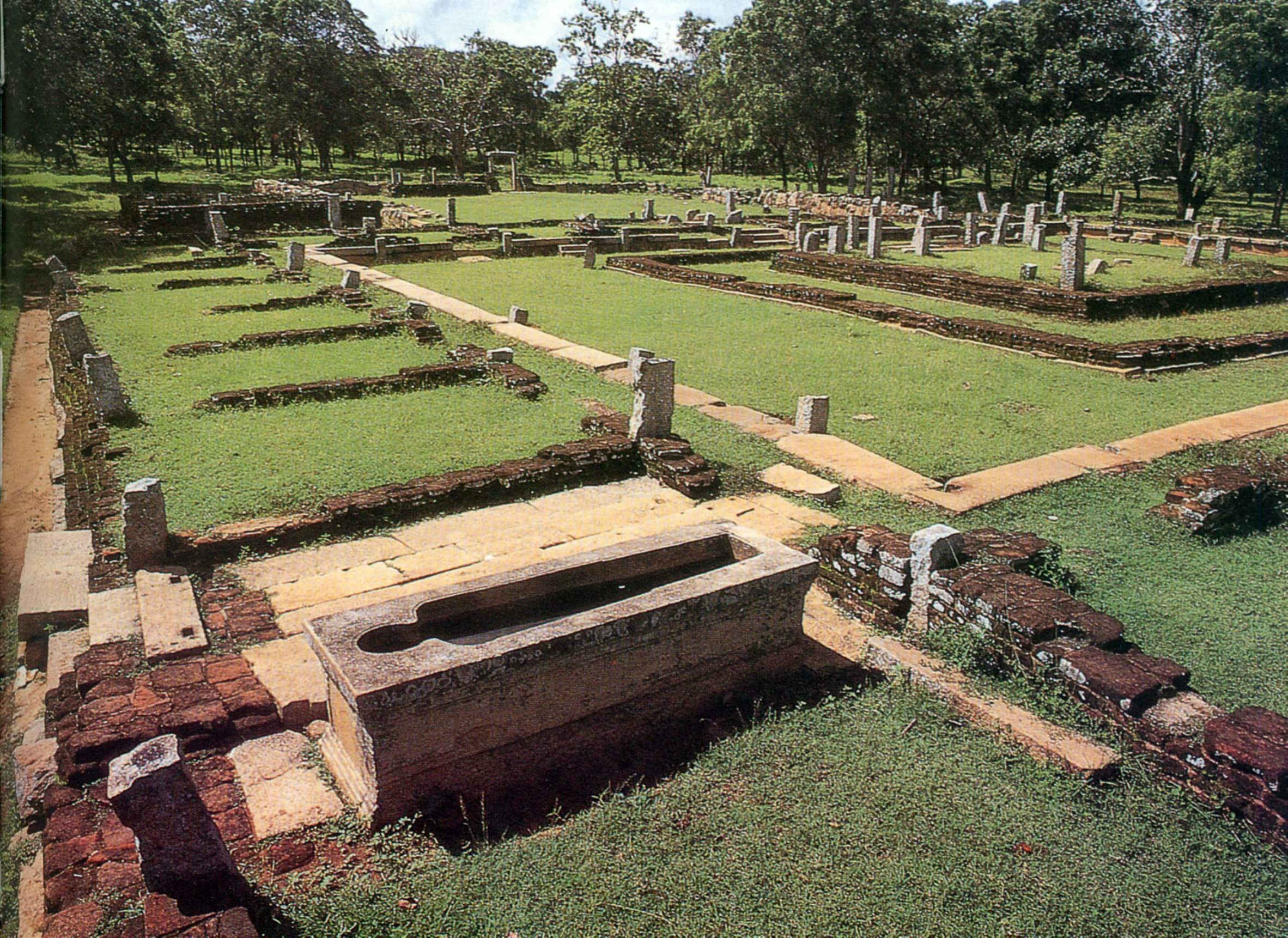
Ancient Mihintale Hospital Complex

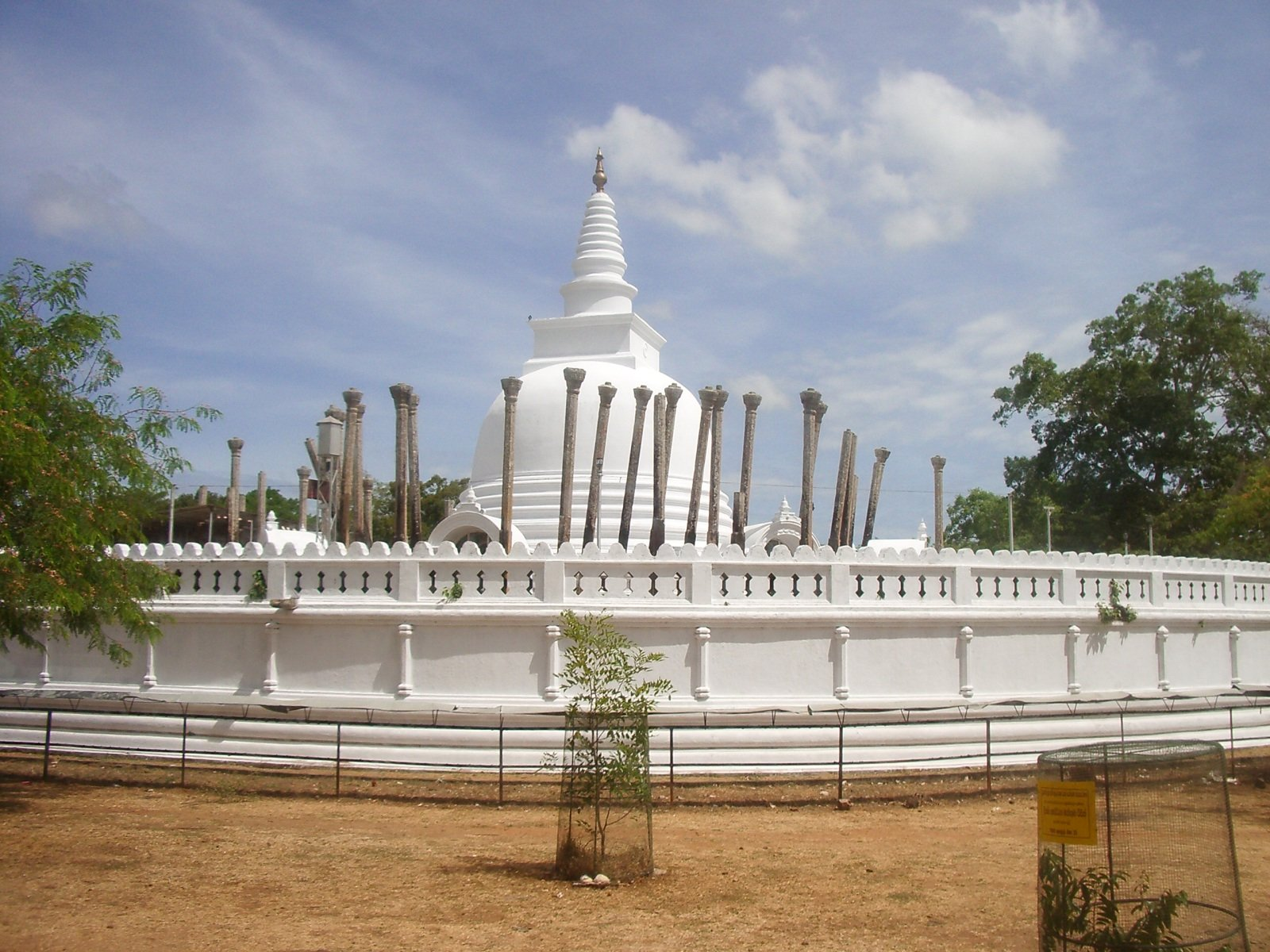
Thuparamaya

== Death and Legacy ==
Sena II died in 887 CE after a reign of thirty-four years, with the chronicles attributing his death to natural causes without providing further detail. His passing brought to a close a period of relative stability in the Anuradhapura Kingdom, achieved in part through successful campaigns that repelled and retaliated against Pandyan incursions from South India, although external pressures from the mainland continued to pose potential threats.

The succession proceeded without recorded dispute, and the throne passed to his younger brother, Udaya, who ascended as King Udaya I.

== See also ==
- List of Sri Lankan monarchs
- History of Sri Lanka

Sena II House of Lambakanna II Born: ? ? Died: ? ?
Regnal titles
| Preceded by Sena I | King of Anuradhapura; 866–901 | Succeeded by Udaya I |
