= Ancient Mihintale Hospital Complex =

Coordinates: 8.3555°N 80.5119°E

- පැරණි මිහින්තලේ රෝහල
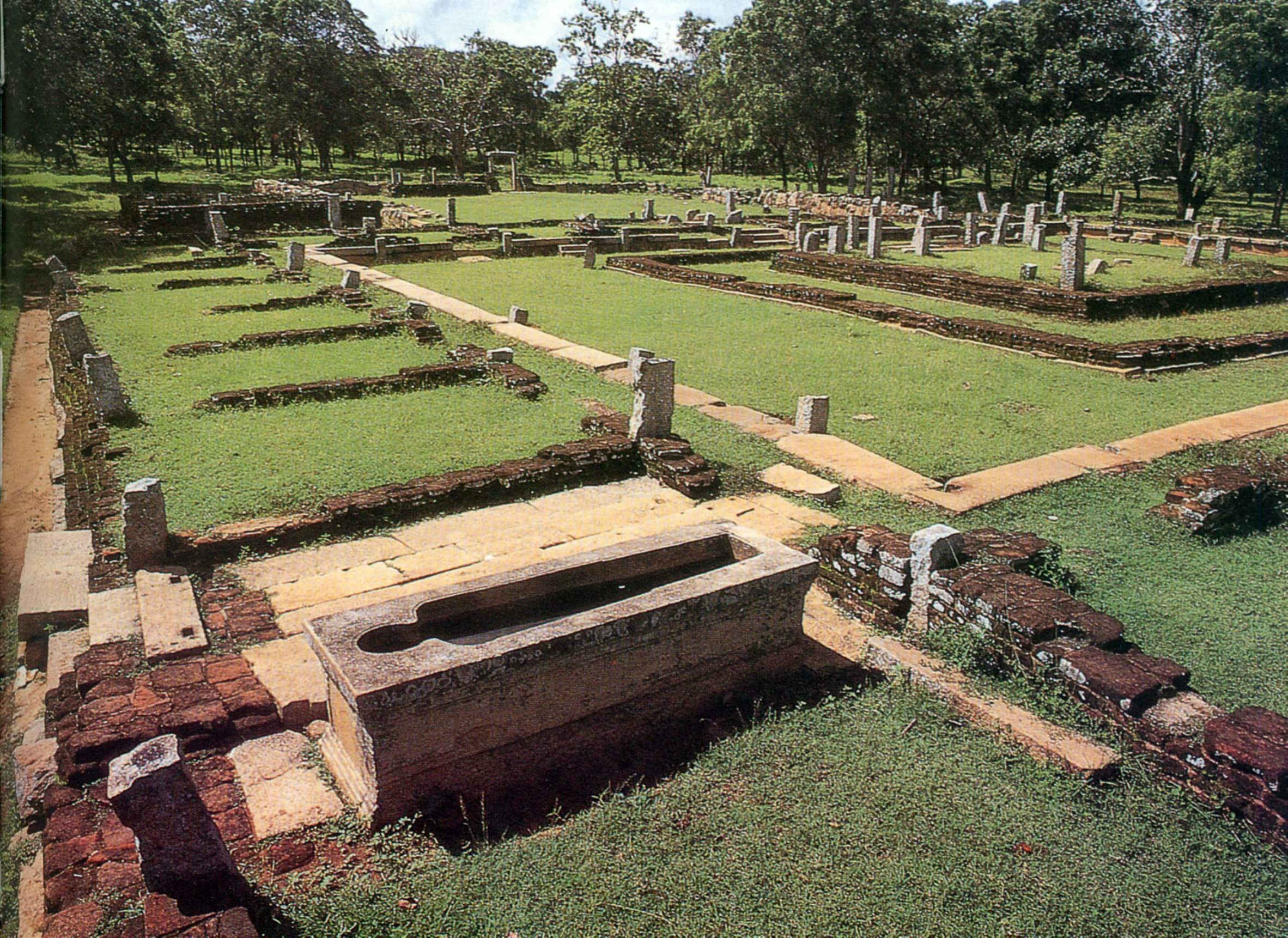
- Medicinal trough in Ancient Mihintale Hospital Complex

General information
- Status: Ruins
- Architectural style: Anuradhapura style
- Location: Sri Lanka
- Year built: Between 853-887 AD

Technical details
- Material: Brick and Stone
- Size: Length-118.6m Width-97.6m

The Ancient Mihintale Hospital Complex (Sinhala: පැරණි මිහින්තලේ රෝහල) is an archaeological site in Sri Lanka. Built by King Sena II between 853 to 887 A.D, it is considered one of the oldest hospital ruins in the world and the oldest existing hospital ruins in Sri Lanka.

== Background ==
The earliest records of hospitals in Sri Lanka show that they were built by Pandukábhaya in the 4th Century BC at various places throughout his kingdom. These consisted of lying-in-homes or homes of delivery for expectant mothers, as well as general hospitals for the treatment and care of the sick. Several other kings such as Upatissa I, Mahanama, Dhatusena, Dappula, Sena I, Sena II, Udaya I, Kashyapa IV, Kashayapa V and Parakramabahu I have also built hospitals.

Anuradhapura, the Rajarata capital, was said by Chinese traveller Fa-Hsien to have contained public gardens, baths, hospitals, and dancing and music halls.

The hospital complex is built near the renowned Cetiya hills, the hospital was said to have been built due to its location being close to the Mihintale monastery which was constructed top of the hill and was densely populated, houses that was built for the population can still be seen.

== Structure ==
Floor plan of the ancient Mihintale hospital complex.

Mihintale hospital complex contains multiple buildings-

- A- Consulting room
- B- Refectory
- C- Hot water baths
- D- Storage and concocting of medicine
- E- Patient rooms
- F- Tampita vihara (Shrine room with a Buddha and pillars)
- G- Ward for medical specialist

Rectangular building with a size of 18.6m long and 97.6m wide structure, containing a courtyard and a Tampita vihara, the main entrance to the complex is from the south and there are other side entrances to the north east of the complex.

Architecture of the Mihintale hospital complex is similar to other hospital complexes found in Medirigiriya and Alahana Pirivena.

Infirmary is found facing the center court and the Tampita vihara, staircase found near the infirmary towards the south is connected to the center court, main building constitutes of a inner and outer court called mandapa, inner court is much more extensive than the outer court, entrance to the inner court is found at the center of the building.

A kitchen is located to the east of the court, Towards the south east of the outer court a room with hot water baths is used to bath patients with hot or cold medicinal water and smearing of medicinal oil or a paste.

Mihintale hospital complex contains 27 rooms for patients, each room approximately has a size of 100 square feet for citizens and monks, a room with a Beheth Oruwa(medicinal trough) is also discovered at the north east of the complex, 3 wards for medical specialist are found close to the patient rooms in each side of the complex, a building for outdoor patients (OPD), Storage and concocting room for medicine and a surgery room was also found at the hospital complex.

== Overview ==
=== Inscription ===
The Mihintale complex itself was mentioned in the Anuradhapura Malwatuoya Pillar Inscription by King Kassapa IV or Udaya I:

On the tenth day of the waxing moon in the month of Mändin (February–March) in the first (regnal) year of His Majesty Abhā Salamevan; I, Sata of Galupula, the Body-Guard, I, Sangi of Kelala, who both came by commission of Perarad Mihindu, and I, Kudasala Kasubdet who came by commission of the Senior Scribe and Chief Guardian Sena, all of us, the executive officers of the Department of the Body-Guard, who came here, granted these immunities sanctioned by the Supreme Council as commanded (in respect of Kelägama) to the effect that the Mañggiva, Piyagiva, Melatti officers of the royal household, the officials of the Two Secretariats, and of the Two Treasuries shall not enter Kelägama which belongs to the General Hospital, situated in the District of Käranã; also carts, oxen, and men shall not be appropriated (for free service) from this village. If there be anyone who violates these commands, may he be born a dog or a crow.

=== Medical items found and further remarks ===
Archaeological excavations show that the Ancient Mihintale hospital is a complex structure. The site has been noted by UNESCO, as drawing a parallel with Medieval Christian churches in Europe in building a separate infirmary for aged and sick priests. According to archaeologist W.I Siriweera, the Mihintale hospital complex can be divided into four categories:

1. Monastic hospitals where in-house treatment was provided for ailing monks for short or long periods
2. Hospitals where in-house treatment was provided for laymen
3. Maternity homes
4. Hospitals where only outdoor treatment was provided

Medical instruments such as Mortar and pestle, quern-stones, pair of scissors, a copper instrument with hooks which is believed to be used to make incision, ceramic flask, pottery and clay jars for storing medicinal solutions, medicinal trough and metal instruments were also found at the site.

The staff in the hospital complex constitutes of physicians, management officials, apothecary and nurses applying leeches.

The medicinal trough (Sinhala: බෙහෙත් ඔරුව, Beheth Oruwa) is a sarcophagus-like stone object found in the inner court of the hospital complex. It has a length of 2.16m, a width of 0.76m, and a height of 0.59 m. It was used to treat patients with Rheumatism by lying them inside and submerging them with medicinal oil and herbs.
