= Aaron Friedenwald =

Aaron Friedenwald (December 20, 1836 – August 26, 1902) was an American physician and ophthalmologist.

== Life and career ==
Friedenwald was born on December 20, 1836, in Baltimore, Maryland, the youngest son of immigrant Jonas Friedenwald. He initially pursued a business career while studying mathematics, literature, German, French, and Hebrew in his spare time. At twenty-one, he began studying medicine at the University of Maryland. After graduating in the spring of 1860, he traveled to Europe to continue his studies in Berlin, Prague, Vienna, and Paris, specializing in ophthalmology.

Friedenwald returned to Baltimore in July 1862 and began practicing medicine. In 1873, he was appointed professor of diseases of the eye and ear at the College of Physicians and Surgeons in Baltimore. He was active in local medical societies and served as president of the Medical and Chirurgical Faculty of Maryland from 1889 to 1890. He also served on the medical staffs of several hospitals. In 1890, he helped found the Association of American Medical Colleges.

Friedenwald was active in local and national Jewish organizations and charities. He helped found the Baltimore Hebrew Orphan Asylum and served as a director for thirty-three years. He chaired the Baron de Hirsch committee in Baltimore and served as president of the Baltimore branch of the Alliance Israélite Universelle. He was also a founder and vice-president of the Jewish Theological Seminary Association, the Jewish Publication Society, the Federation of American Zionists, and the Union of Orthodox Congregations of America. In 1898, he traveled to the Holy Land to study conditions in the Jewish colonies.

Friedenwald lectured and contributed to medical literature. His publications included addresses on medical education, the history of hospitals, Jewish immigration, and Jewish colonies in Palestine. His most important publication was Jewish Physicians and the Contributions of the Jews to the Science of Medicine. He died in Baltimore on August 26, 1902.
