= History of hospitals =

The history of hospitals began in antiquity with hospitals in Greece, the Roman Empire, Sasanian Iran and on the Indian subcontinent as well, starting with precursors in the Asclepian temples in ancient Greece and then the military hospitals in ancient Rome. The Greek temples were dedicated to the sick and infirm but did not look anything like modern hospitals. The Romans did not have dedicated, public hospitals. Public hospitals, per se, did not exist until the Christian period. Towards the end of the 4th century, the "second medical revolution" took place with the founding of the first Christian hospital in the eastern Byzantine Empire by Basil of Caesarea, and within a few decades, such hospitals had become ubiquitous in Byzantine society. The hospital would undergo development and progress throughout Byzantine, medieval European and Islamic societies from the 5th to the 15th century. European exploration brought hospitals to colonies in North America, Africa, and Asia. St Bartholomew's hospital in West Smithfield in London, founded in 1123, is widely considered the oldest functioning hospital today. Originally a charitable institution, currently an NHS hospital it continues to provide free care to Londoners, as it has for 900 years. In contrast, the Mihintale Hospital in Sri Lanka, established in the 9th century is probably the site with the oldest archaeological evidence available for a hospital in the world. Serving monks and the local community, it represents early advancements in healthcare practices.

The first Western-style hospital in Japan was established in 1556 by Jesuit missionary Luis de Almeida. Early Chinese and Korean hospitals were founded by Western missionaries in the 1800s. In the early modern era care and healing would transition into a secular affair in the West for many hospitals. During World War I and World War II, many military hospitals and hospital innovations were created. Government run hospitals increased in Korea, Japan, China, and the Middle East after World War II. In the late 1900s and 21st century, hospital networks and government health organizations were formed to manage groups of hospitals to control costs and share resources. Many smaller, less efficient hospitals in the West were closed because they could not be sustained.

== Antiquity ==
In ancient history, hospitals have been documented in Greece, Rome, the Indian subcontinent, and Iran. In ancient cultures, religion and medicine were linked.

=== Greece ===
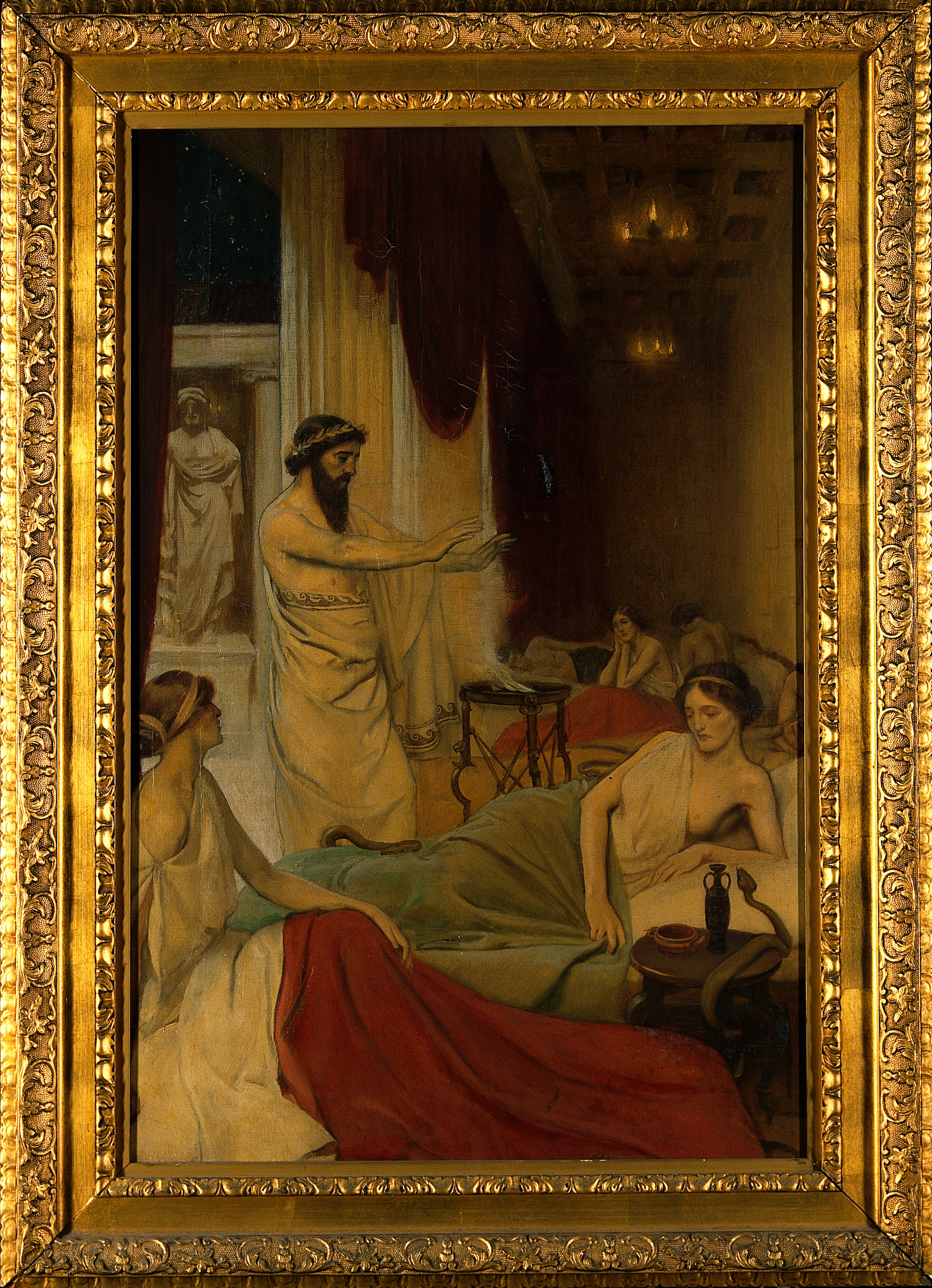
Painting depicting patients in an Asclepeion in Ancient Greece

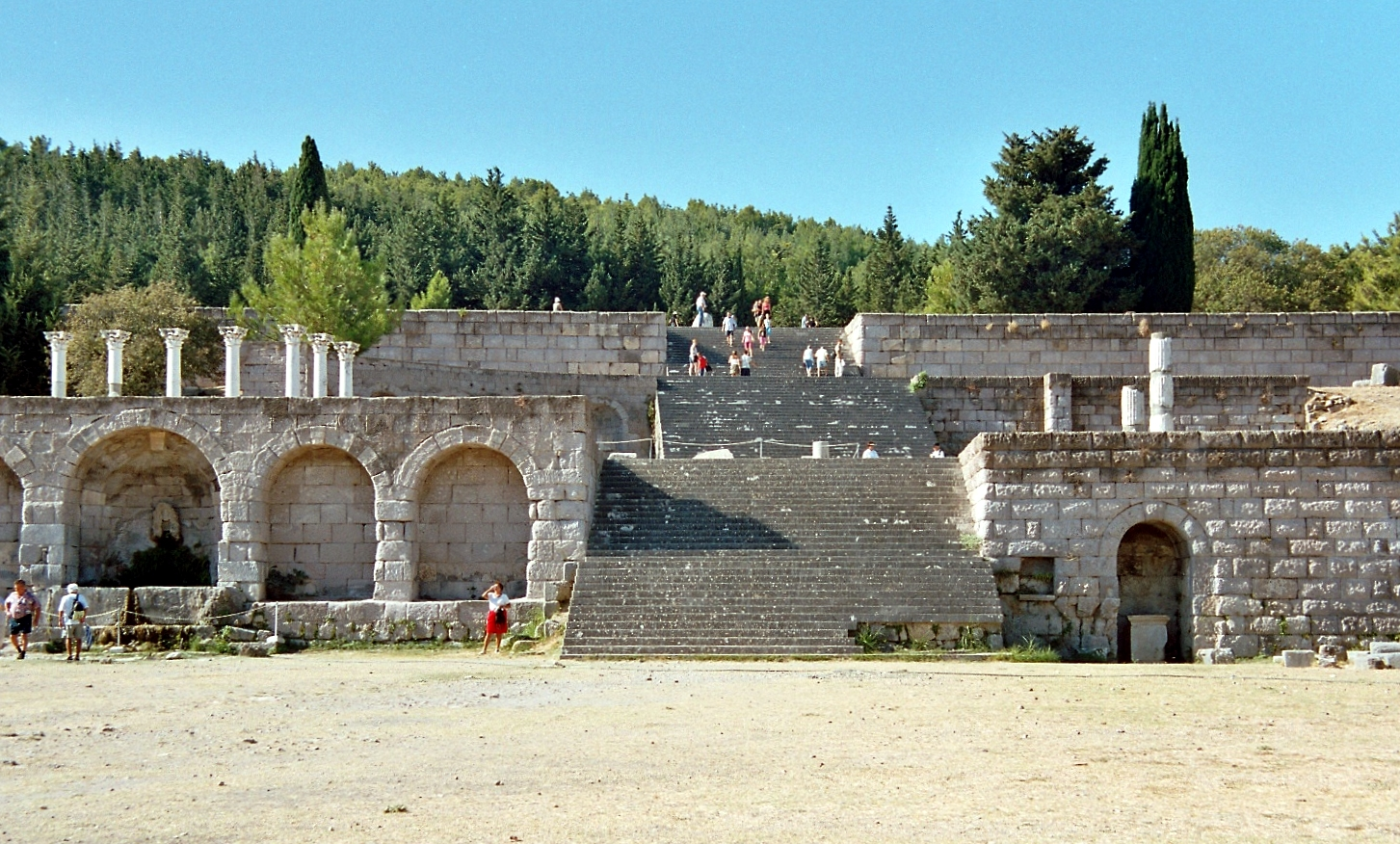
View of the Askleipion of Kos, the best preserved instance of a Greek Asklepieion.

In ancient Greece, temples dedicated to the healer-god Asclepius, known as Asclepieia (Ancient Greek: Ἀσκληπιεῖα, sing. Asclepieion, Ἀσκληπιεῖον), functioned as centres of medical advice, prognosis, and healing. Asclepeia provided carefully controlled spaces conducive to healing and fulfilled several of the requirements of institutions created for healing. Under his Roman name Æsculapius, he was provided with a temple (291 BCE) on an island in the Tiber in Rome (the Tiber Island), where similar rites were performed.

At these shrines, patients would enter a dream-like state of induced sleep known as enkoimesis (ἐγκοίμησις) not unlike anesthesia, in which they either received guidance from the deity in a dream. In the Asclepieion of Epidaurus, three large marble boards dated to 350 BCE preserve the names, case histories, complaints, and cures of about 70 patients who came to the temple with a problem and shed it there. Some of the surgical cures listed, such as the opening of an abdominal abscess or the removal of traumatic foreign material, are realistic enough to have taken place, but with the patient in a state of enkoimesis induced with the help of soporific substances such as opium. The worship of Asclepius was adopted by the Romans.

The Athenian Navy had a ship named Therapia, and the Roman Navy had a ship named Aesculapius, their names indicating that they may have been hospital ships.

=== Roman Empire ===
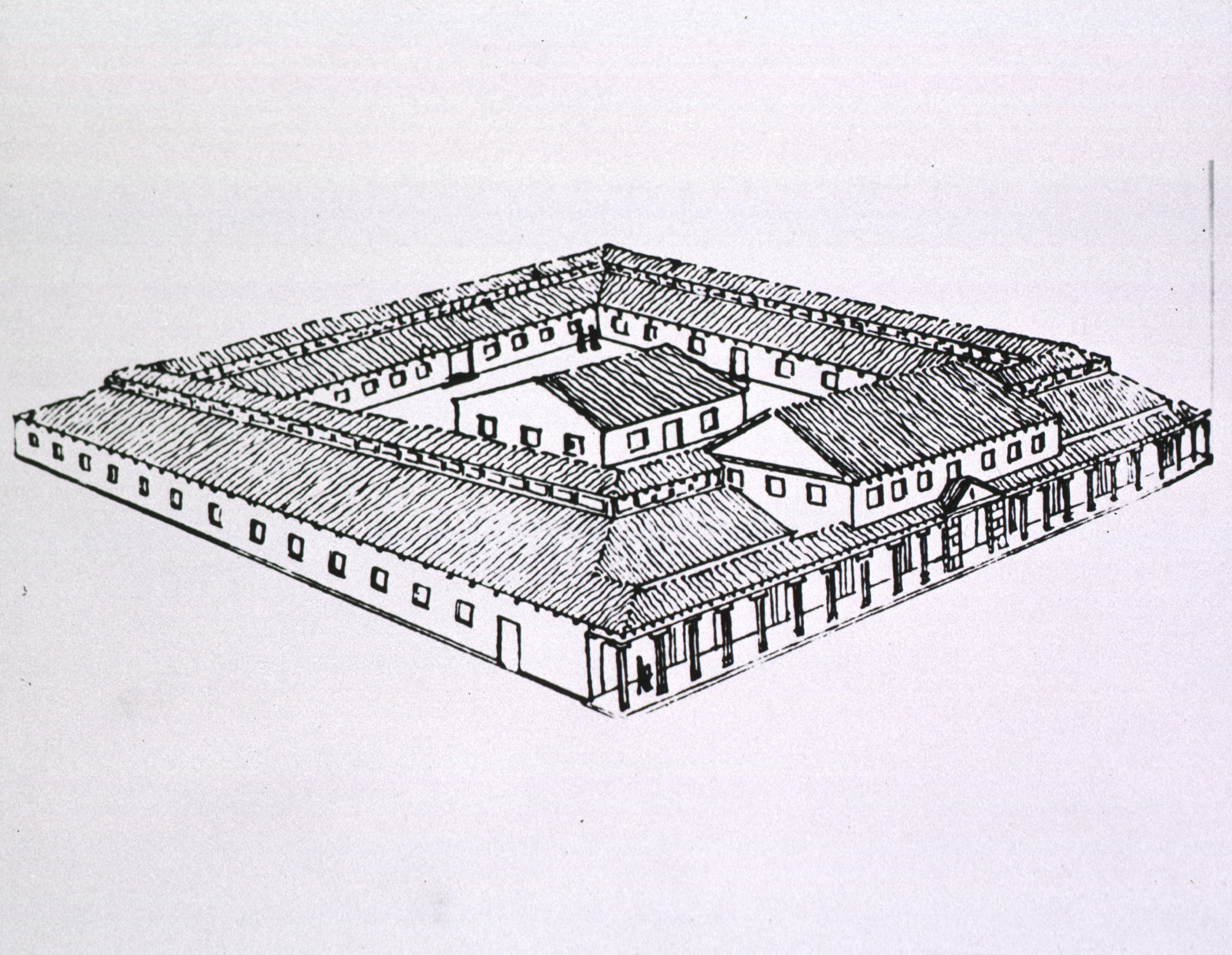
Reconstruction of Roman military hospital at Windisch, Switzerland

The Romans constructed buildings called valetudinaria for the care of sick slaves, gladiators, and soldiers around 100 BCE, and many were identified by later archaeology. While their existence is considered proven, there is some doubt as to whether they were as widespread as was once thought, as many were identified only according to the layout of building remains, and not by means of surviving records or finds of medical tools.

The declaration of Christianity as an accepted religion in the Roman Empire drove an expansion of the provision of care. Following First Council of Nicaea in 325 CE construction of a hospital in every cathedral town was begun. Among the earliest were those built by the physician Saint Sampson in Constantinople and by Basil of Caesarea in modern-day Turkey towards the end of the 4th century. By the beginning of the 5th century, the hospital had already become ubiquitous throughout the Christian east in the Byzantine world, this being a dramatic shift from the pre-Christian era of the Roman Empire where no civilian hospitals existed. Called the "Basilias", the latter resembled a city and included housing for doctors and nurses and separate buildings for various classes of patients. There was a separate section for lepers. Some hospitals maintained libraries and training programs, and doctors compiled their medical and pharmacological studies in manuscripts. Thus in-patient medical care in the sense of what we today consider a hospital, was an invention driven by Christian mercy and Byzantine innovation. Byzantine hospital staff included the Chief Physician (archiatroi), professional nurses (hypourgoi) and the orderlies (hyperetai). By the twelfth century, Constantinople had two well-organized hospitals, staffed by doctors who were both male and female. Facilities included systematic treatment procedures and specialized wards for various diseases.

=== South & East Asia ===
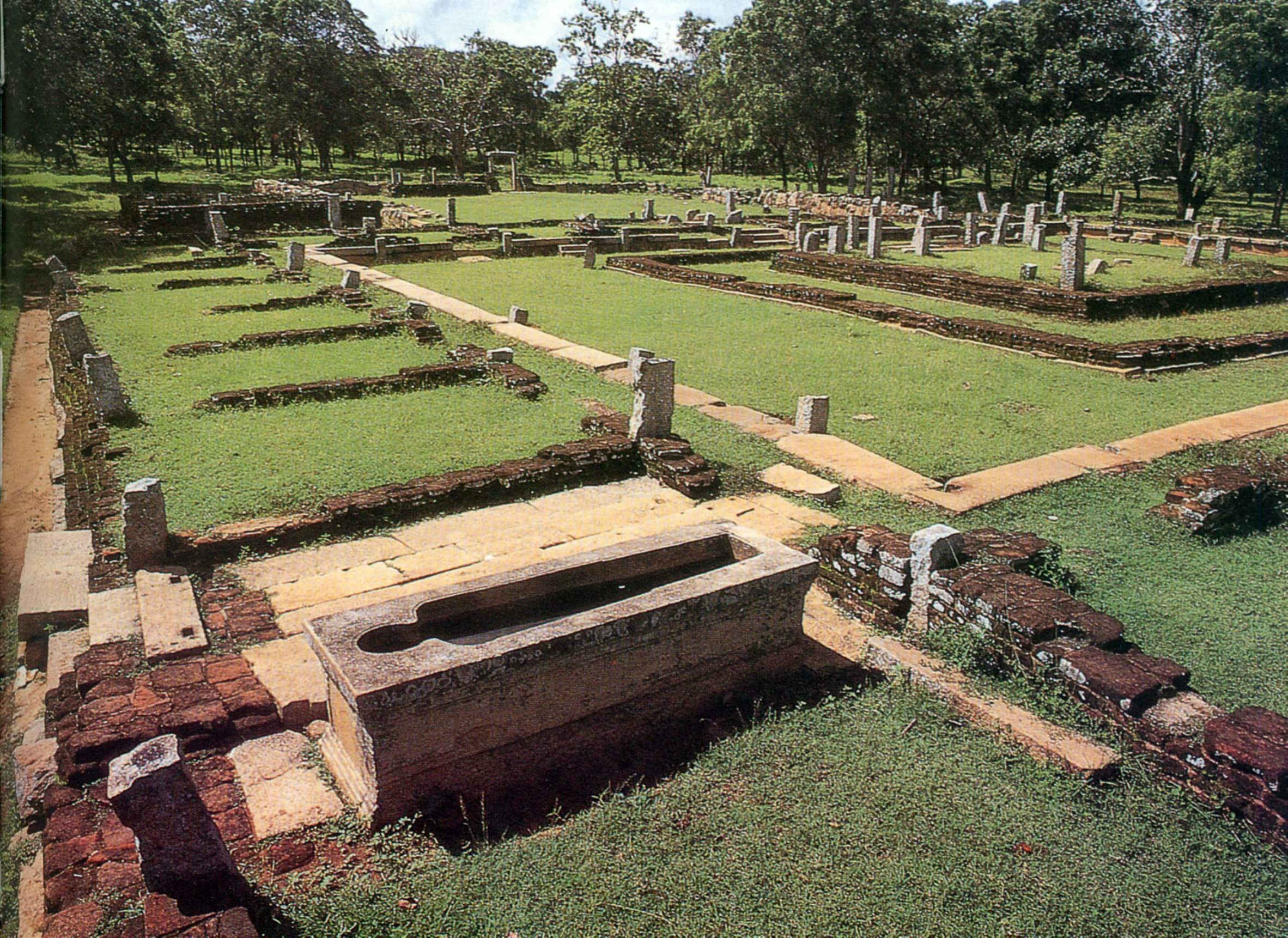
Ruins of a two thousand year old hospital were discovered in the historical city of Anuradhapura Mihintale Sri Lanka

During the 4th century BCE in ancient Sri Lanka, according to the Mahāvaṃsa chronicle from the 6th century CE, King Pandukabhaya constructed hospitals and lying-in-homes after fortifying his capital in Anuradhapura. This provides the earliest literary evidence of hospitals, where patients could be housed and treated collectively. The oldest archaeological evidence of a hospital in Asia can be found in the ruins of Mihintale, dating back to the ninth century. Scholars suggest that this may be one of the oldest hospitals in the world.

King Ashoka is said by many secondary sources to have founded hospitals ca. 230 BCE. Early medical practices emerged early on in the Indian subcontinent with the practice of Ayurvedic medicine, one of the earliest texts for which survive being the Charaka Samhita and Sushruta Samhita. Some early Buddhist communities established monastic communities with monasteries, and many of these monasteries were centers of learning for medicine. While sick monks within the monastic communities were usually treated in their own cells, some monasteries reserved a room where sick monks could be taken care of. While some of these rooms in Buddhist monasteries may have been open to the public, the majority were closed off to the public and were reserved for treating other monks within the monastery. This ideal is reflected in the story of the monk with dysentery. The first clear reference to an actual hospital within the southeast Asian world occurs in the accounts of the traveller Fa Xian in the 5th century CE, who describes hospitals in the city of Pataliputra and a few other sites:

The benevolent and educated persons of this country have instituted a free hospital within the city; and hither come all poor or helpless inhabitants suffering from all kinds of infirmities. They are well taken care of, and a doctor attends them, food and medicine being supplied according to their wants. Thus they are made quite comfortable, and when they are well they may go away.

The first clear archaeological evidence of such hospitals first appears in the eighth and ninth centuries. Nevertheless, it would be inaccurate to portray the period as a time when a system of hospitals had existed. Rather, rulers from time to time may have sponsored and allocated resources for particular medical care for the population in particular places. In one case, a countrywide system of hospitals was established in 12th century Cambodia under the Cambodian king Jayavarman VII, who associated it with the Buddha of healing Bhaisajyaguru.

Significant and asymmetric transfers of knowledge to the southeast Asian world from the Greek one began during the reign of Alexander the Great in the late 4th century BCE as Hellenization swept the continent. While usually assumed that Tibetan medicine was largely Chinese in origin, it turns out that Tibetan medicine was actually largely Westernized, at least during the first century of the Tibetan Empire in the 7th–8th centuries. Persian and Arab doctors from the Islamic Caliphate could be found all across China in this time period. It's also possible that Indian physicians played a role in a short-lived, but still one of the earliest Abbasid hospitals established by the Barkamid family.

== 5th to the 15th century ==
Notable hospital articles by century established (number of articles in Wikipedia)
5th (1)	6th (2)	7th (1)	8th (1)	9th (1)	10th (2)	11th (5)	12th (17)	13th (14)	14th (8)	15th (16)

Notable hospitals established between 500 and 1500 CE
529	Persian Academy of Gondishapur hospital and medical training center established in Persia
543 (about)	First hospital built at Monte Cassino by Saint Benedict, first of many Medieval Monastic hospitals
580	First Spanish xenodochium (hospital) founded by the Catholic Visigoth bishop Masona at Mérida, Spain
706/707	Al-Wahid Bimarstan, first Islamic hospital built in Damascus
727	Ospedale di Santo Spirito in Sassia hospital established in Italy
800 or earlier	Early hospital established in Sri Lanka at Mihintale, Sri Lanka
805	Medieval Islamic Bimaristan (hospital) built in Bagdad
829	Hôtel-Dieu (French hospital) established in Paris
872	Al-Fustat Hospital established in Cairo, one of the first hospitals to offer mental health treatment
981	Al-'Adudi Hospital Bimaristan established in Baghdad by King 'Adud al-Dawla
1083–1084	Hospital of St Nicholas, Nantwich, hospital for travelers in Nantwich, England
1085	Hospital of St John the Baptist, Winchester, early almshouse that became a hospital in Winchester, England
1090	Santa Maria della Scala, Siena established in Siena, Italy
1123	St. Bartholomew's Hospital, oldest hospital in the world still providing medical services on the site it was originally built on
1140 (circa)	Old St. John's Hospital one of the oldest hospital buildings in Europe with its regulations dating back to 1188
1197	Hôpital de La Grave, used to treat plague patients between 1508 and 1514
1198	Hilandar Hospital, the first and oldest Serbian hospital.
1208	Studenica Hospital, Studenica, Serbia, followed Hilandar Hospital standard.
1211–1222	Ospedale di San Paolo, early Franciscan hospital in Florence, Italy
1238	Hospital ante Brunem, early Johanitte hospital still serving Brno, Czech Republic
1249	Great Hospital, medieval hospital still serving Norwich, England
1277	Ospedale del Ceppo, Medieval hospital founded for the poor in Pistoia, Italy
1288	Hospital of Santa Maria Nuova, oldest hospital still active in Florence, Italy
13th Century (late)	Maristan of Sidi Frej, influential Maristan (hospital) in Fez, Morocco
1325 (circa)	Hospital of St John the Baptist, Arbroath, Arbroath, Scotland; early Medieval hospital
1339	San Giacomo degli Incurabili, medieval hospital in Rome, near the Porto di Ripetta
1354	Nemocnice Na Františku, oldest hospital in Prague, still in use on the bank of Vltava river
1388	University Hospital Heidelberg founded, oldest in Germany
1454	Hôtel-Dieu de Lyon, medieval hospital in Lyon, France
1456	Ospedale Maggiore di Milano, founded by the Duke of Milan, Italy; in continuous operation
1449	Policlinico San Matteo, teaching hospital in Lombardy, Italy
1491	Dar-ul-Shifa hospital established in Old Hyderabad, India

In the Medieval period the term hospital encompassed hostels for travellers, dispensaries for poor relief, clinics and surgeries for the injured, and homes for the blind, lame, elderly, and mentally ill. Monastic hospitals developed many treatments, both therapeutic and spiritual.

During the thirteenth century an immense number of hospitals were built. The Italian cities were the leaders of the movement. Milan had no fewer than a dozen hospitals and Florence before the end of the fourteenth century had some thirty hospitals. Some of these were very beautiful buildings. At Milan a portion of the general hospital was designed by Bramante and another part of it by Michelangelo. The Hospital of Siena, built in honor of St. Catherine, has been famous ever since. Everywhere throughout Europe this hospital movement spread. Virchow, the great German pathologist, in an article on hospitals, showed that every city of Germany of five thousand inhabitants had its hospital. He traced all of this hospital movement to Pope Innocent III, and though he was least papistically inclined, Virchow did not hesitate to give extremely high praise to this pontiff for all that he had accomplished for the benefit of children and suffering mankind.

Hospitals began to appear in great numbers in France and England. Following the French Norman invasion into England, the explosion of French ideals led most Medieval monasteries to develop a hospitium or hospice for pilgrims. This hospitium eventually developed into what we now understand as a hospital, with various monks and lay helpers providing the medical care for sick pilgrims and victims of the numerous plagues and chronic diseases that afflicted Medieval Western Europe. Benjamin Gordon supports the theory that the hospital – as we know it – is a French invention, but that it was originally developed for isolating lepers and plague victims, and only later undergoing modification to serve the pilgrim.

Owing to a well-preserved 12th-century account of the monk Eadmer of the Canterbury cathedral, there is an excellent account of Bishop Lanfranc's aim to establish and maintain examples of these early hospitals:

But I must not conclude my work by omitting what he did for the poor outside the walls of the city Canterbury. In brief, he constructed a decent and ample house of stone...for different needs and conveniences. He divided the main building into two, appointing one part for men oppressed by various kinds of infirmities and the other for women in a bad state of health. He also made arrangements for their clothing and daily food, appointing ministers and guardians to take all measures so that nothing should be lacking for them.

=== India ===
During the Chola Empire (9th to 13th centuries CE), health care was institutionalized via state-supported village dispensaries and hospitals alternatively referred to in epigraphs as atulasalai or vaidyasalai. These facilities were commonly integrated into local temple economies and sustained via vaittiyavritti—royal land grants specifically allocated to hereditary medical practitioners.

The most complete operational blueprint of a Chola medical center comes from a 1067 CE inscription commissioned by Emperor Veera Rajendra Chola at the Venkateswara temple in Tirumukkudal. The inscription details the Veera Cholesvara Hospital, a 15-bed institutional infirmary that provided Ayurvedic and Siddha care to students, teachers, and temple members. The staff followed a strict institutional hierarchy, consisting of a chief physician, a surgeon, two male herbalists, two female nurses responsible for feeding and dosage preparation, a barber, a washerman, and a waterman.

=== Persia ===
The Academy of Gondishapur was a hospital and medical training center at Gundeshapur in Persia. The city of Gundeshapur was founded in 271 CE by the Sasanian king Shapur I. It was one of the major cities in Khuzestan province of the Persian empire, in Iran. A large percentage of the population were Syriacs, most of whom were Christians. Under the rule of Khosrow I, refuge was granted to Greek Nestorian Christian philosophers including the scholars of the Persian School of Edessa (Urfa) (also called the Academy of Athens), a Christian theological and medical university. These scholars made their way to Gundeshapur in 529 following the closing of the academy by Emperor Justinian. They were engaged in medical sciences and initiated the first translation projects of medical texts. The arrival of these medical practitioners from Edessa marks the beginning of the hospital and medical centre at Gundeshapur. It included a medical school and hospital (bimaristan), a pharmacology laboratory, a translation house, a library and an observatory. Indian doctors also contributed to the school at Gundeshapur, most notably the medical researcher Mankah. Following the Muslim conquest of Persia in the 7th century, the writings of Mankah (Ancient Indian physician) and of the ancient Indian physician and surgeon Sushruta were translated into Arabic at Baghdad's House of Wisdom.

=== Medieval Islamic hospitals ===
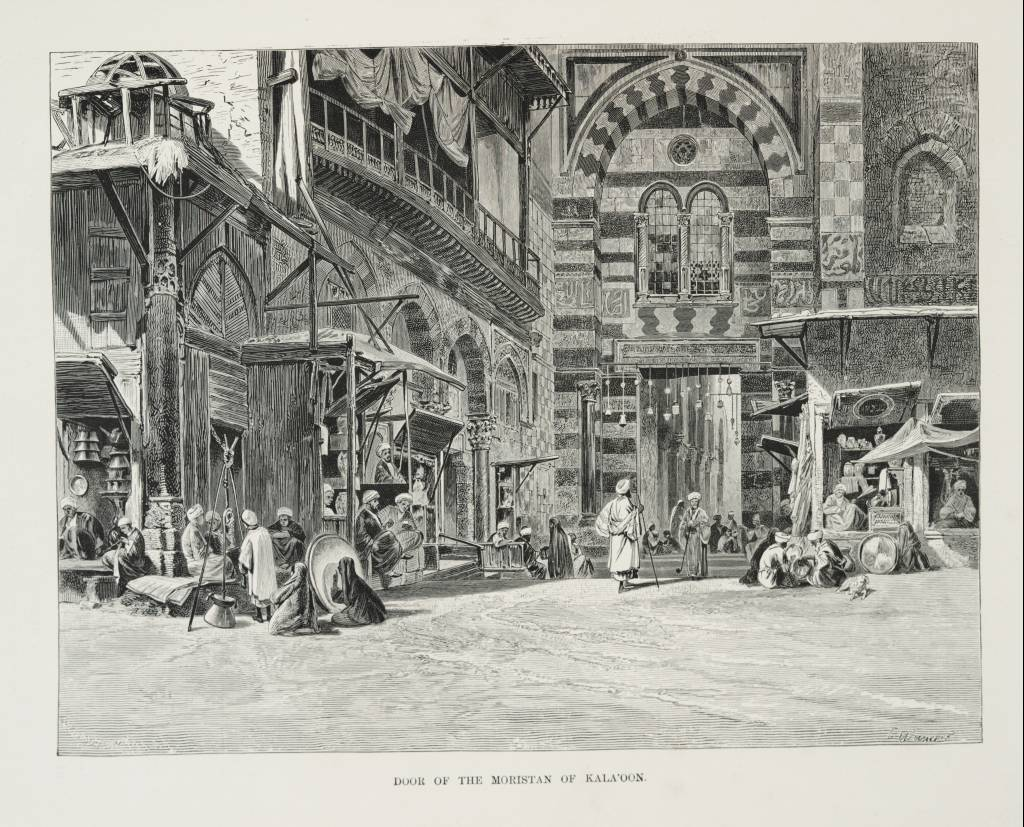
Entrance to the Qalawun complex in Cairo, Egypt which housed the notable Mansuri hospital.

The first Muslim hospital was an asylum to contain leprosy, built in the early eighth century, where patients were confined but, like the blind, were given a stipend to support their families. The earliest general hospital was built in 805 CE in Baghdad by Harun Al-Rashid. By the tenth century, Baghdad had five more hospitals, while Damascus had six hospitals by the 15th century and Córdoba alone had 50 major hospitals, many exclusively for the military. Many of the prominent early Islamic hospitals were founded with assistance by Christians such as Jibrael ibn Bukhtishu from Gundeshapur. "Bimaristan" is a compound of "bimar" (sick or ill) and "stan" (place). In the medieval Islamic world, the word "bimaristan" referred to a hospital establishment where the ill were welcomed, cared for and treated by qualified staff.

The United States National Library of Medicine credits the hospital as being a product of medieval Islamic civilization. Compared to contemporaneous Christian institutions, which were poor and sick relief facilities offered by some monasteries, the Islamic hospital was a more elaborate institution with a wider range of functions. In Islam, there was a moral imperative to treat the ill regardless of financial status. Islamic hospitals tended to be large, urban structures, and were largely secular institutions, many open to all, whether male or female, civilian or military, child or adult, rich or poor, Muslim or non-Muslim. The Islamic hospital served several purposes, as a center of medical treatment, a home for patients recovering from illness or accidents, an insane asylum, and a retirement home with basic maintenance needs for the aged and infirm.

The typical hospital was divided into departments such as systemic diseases, surgery and orthopedics with larger hospitals having more diverse specialties. "Systemic diseases" was the rough equivalent of today's internal medicine and was further divided into sections such as fever, infections and digestive issues. Every department had an officer-in-charge, a presiding officer and a supervising specialist. The hospitals also had lecture theaters and libraries. Hospitals staff included sanitary inspectors, who regulated cleanliness, and accountants and other administrative staff. The hospital in Baghdad employed twenty-five staff physicians. The hospitals were typically run by a three-man board comprising a non-medical administrator, the chief pharmacist, called the shaykh saydalani, who was equal in rank to the chief physician, who served as mutwalli (dean). Medical facilities traditionally closed each night, but by the 10th century laws were passed to keep hospitals open 24 hours a day.

For less serious cases, physicians staffed outpatient clinics. Cities also had first aid centers staffed by physicians for emergencies that were often located in busy public places, such as big gatherings for Friday prayers to take care of casualties. The region also had mobile units staffed by doctors and pharmacists who were supposed to meet the need of remote communities. Baghdad was also known to have a separate hospital for convicts since the early 10th century after the vizier 'Ali ibn Isa ibn Jarah ibn Thabit wrote to Baghdad's chief medical officer that "prisons must have their own doctors who should examine them every day". The first hospital built in Egypt, in Cairo's Southwestern quarter, was the first documented facility to care for mental illnesses while the first Islamic psychiatric hospital opened in Baghdad in 705.

Medical students would accompany physicians and participate in patient care. Hospitals in this era were the first to require medical diplomas to license doctors. The licensing test was administered by the region's government appointed chief medical officer. The test had two steps; the first was to write a treatise, on the subject the candidate wished to obtain a certificate, of original research or commentary of existing texts, which they were encouraged to scrutinize for errors. The second step was to answer questions in an interview with the chief medical officer. Physicians worked fixed hours and medical staff salaries were fixed by law. For regulating the quality of care and arbitrating cases, it is related that if a patient dies, their family presents the doctor's prescriptions to the chief physician who would judge if the death was natural or if it was by negligence, in which case the family would be entitled to compensation from the doctor. The hospitals had male and female quarters while some hospitals only saw men and other hospitals, staffed by women physicians, only saw women. While women physicians practiced medicine, many largely focused on obstetrics.

Hospitals were forbidden by law to turn away patients who were unable to pay. Eventually, charitable foundations called waqfs were formed to support hospitals, as well as schools. Part of the state budget also went towards maintaining hospitals. While the services of the hospital were free for all citizens and patients were sometimes given a small stipend to support recovery upon discharge, individual physicians occasionally charged fees. In a notable endowment, a 13th-century governor of Egypt Al Mansur Qalawun ordained a foundation for the Qalawun hospital that would contain a mosque and a chapel, separate wards for different diseases, a library for doctors and a pharmacy and the hospital is used today for ophthalmology. The Qalawun hospital was based in a former Fatimid palace which had accommodation for 8,000 people - "it served 4,000 patients daily." The waqf stated,

...The hospital shall keep all patients, men and women, until they are completely recovered. All costs are to be borne by the hospital whether the people come from afar or near, whether they are residents or foreigners, strong or weak, low or high, rich or poor, employed or unemployed, blind or sighted, physically or mentally ill, learned or illiterate. There are no conditions of consideration and payment, none is objected to or even indirectly hinted at for non-payment.

The first, most well known physicians in the Medieval Islamic world were polymaths Ibn Sina, (Greek: Avicenna) and Al Rhazi (Greek: Rhazes) during the 10th and 11th centuries.

=== Medieval European hospitals ===
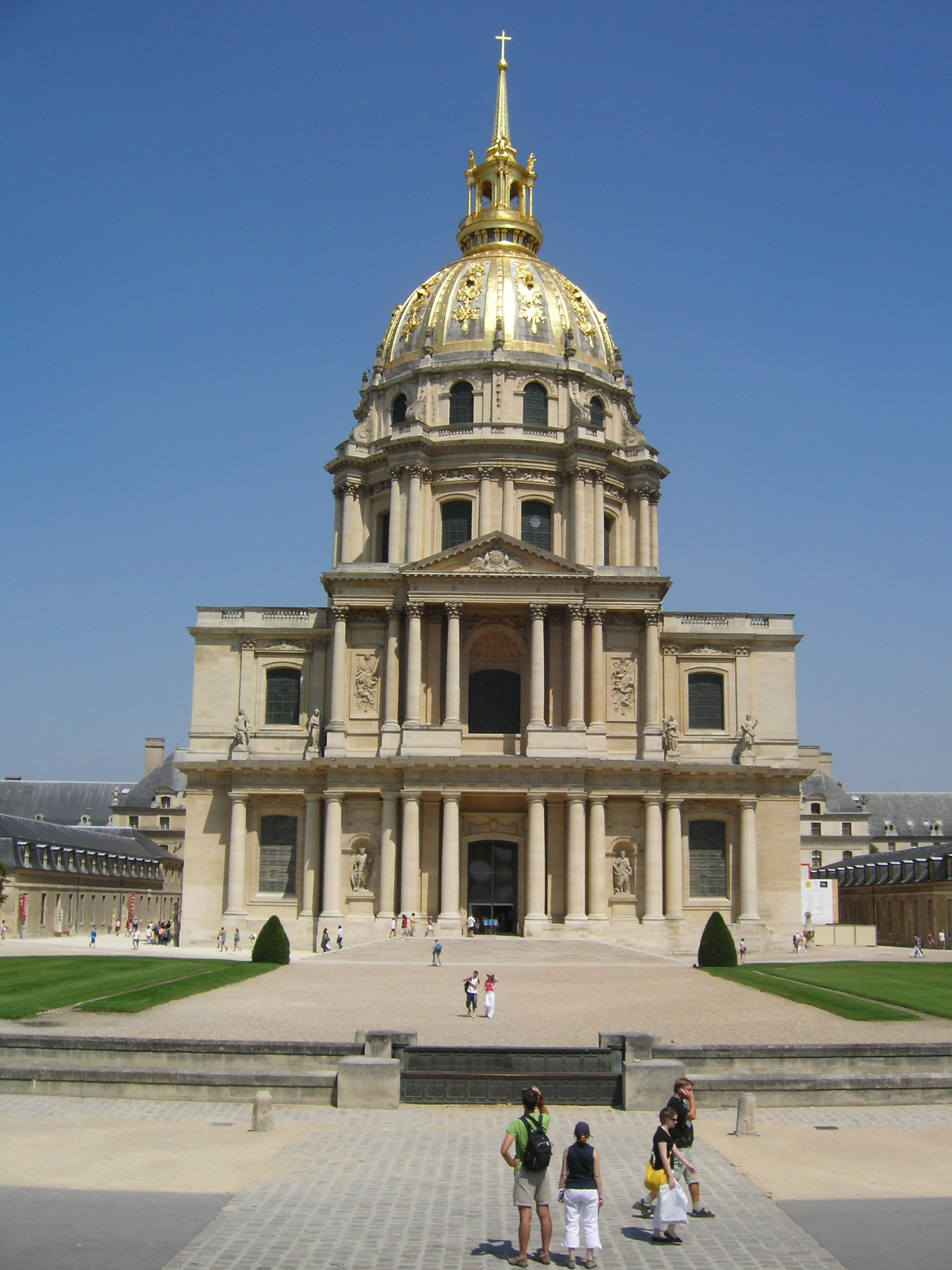
The church at Les Invalides in Paris, showing the typically close connection between hospitals and the Catholic church

Medieval hospitals in Europe followed a similar pattern to the Byzantine. They were religious communities, with care provided by monks and nuns. An old French term for hospital is hôtel-Dieu, "hostel of God." Some were attached to monasteries; others were independent and had their own endowments, usually of property, which provided income for their support. Some hospitals were multi-functional while others were founded for specific purposes such as leper hospitals, or as refuges for the poor, or for pilgrims: not all cared for the sick.

Around 529 CE St. Benedict of Nursia (480–543 CE), later a Christian saint, the founder of western monasticism and the Order of St. Benedict, today the patron saint of Europe, established the first monastery in Europe (Monte Cassino) on a hilltop between Rome and Naples, that became a model for the Western monasticism and one of the major cultural centers of Europe throughout the Middle Ages. St. Benedict wrote the Rule of Saint Benedict which mandated the moral obligations to care for the sick.

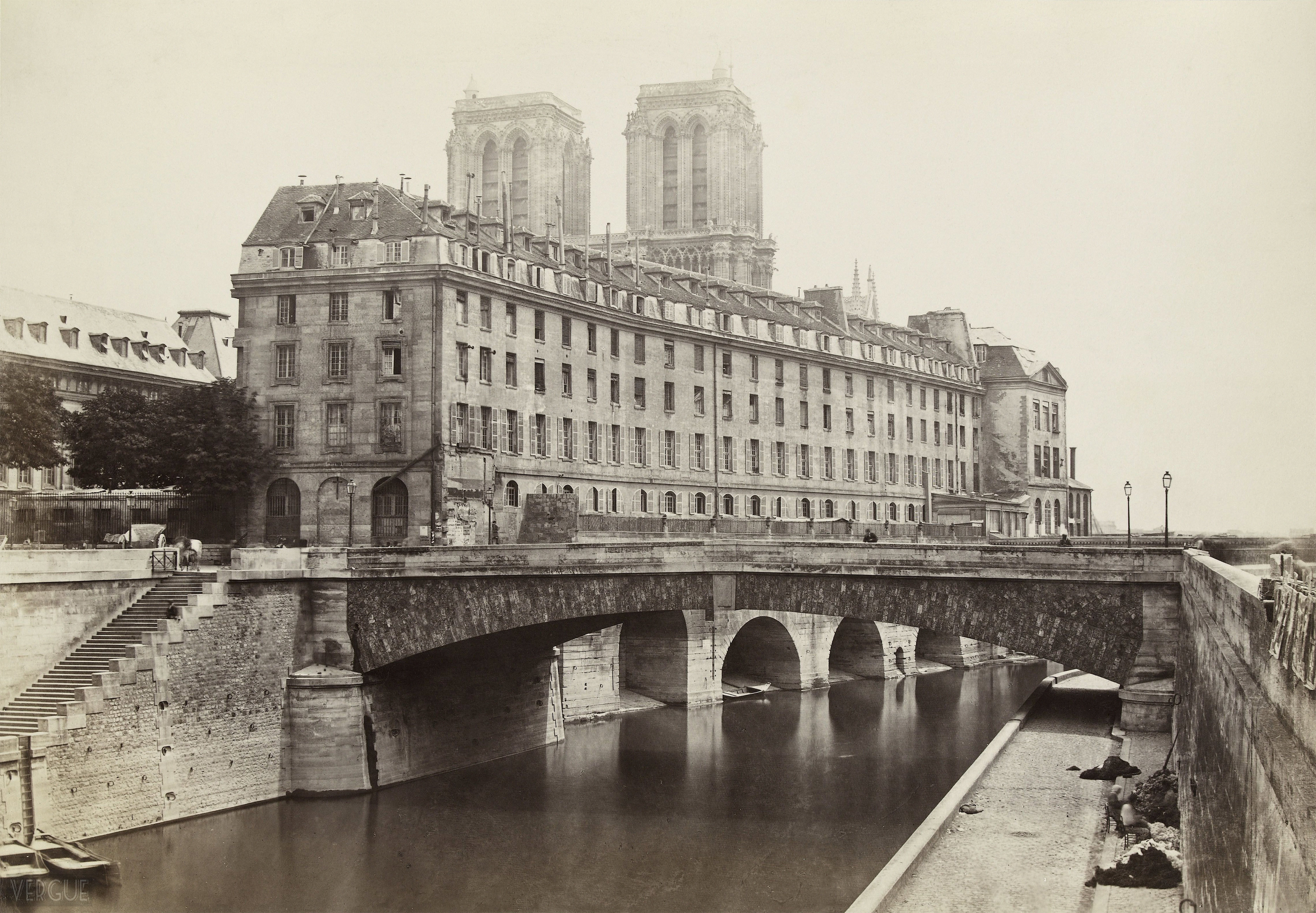
Hôtel-Dieu of Paris.

The first Spanish hospital, founded by the Catholic Visigoth bishop Masona in 580 CE at Mérida, was a xenodochium designed as an inn for travellers (mostly pilgrims to the shrine of Eulalia of Mérida) as well as a hospital for citizens and local farmers. The hospital's endowment consisted of farms to feed its patients and guests. From the account given by Paul the Deacon we learn that this hospital was supplied with physicians and nurses, whose mission included the care the sick wherever they were found, "slave or free, Christian or Jew." In 650, the "Hôtel-Dieu" was found in Paris, but its first recorded mention only dates back to 829, it is considered by many as the oldest worldwide hospital still operating today. It was a multipurpose institution which catered for the sick and poor, offering shelter, food and medical care.

During the late 8th and early 9th centuries, Emperor Charlemagne decreed that those hospitals that had been well conducted before his time and had fallen into decay should be restored in accordance with the needs of the time. He further ordered that a hospital should be attached to each cathedral and monastery.

During the 10th century, the monasteries became a dominant factor in hospital work. The famous Benedictine Abbey of Cluny, founded in 910, set the example which was widely imitated throughout France and Germany. Besides its infirmary for the religious, each monastery had a hospital in which externs were cared for. These were in charge of the eleemosynarius, whose duties, carefully prescribed by the rule, included every sort of service that the visitor or patient could require.

As the eleemosynarius was obliged to seek out the sick and needy in the neighborhood, each monastery became a center for the relief of suffering. Among the monasteries notable in this respect were those of the Benedictines at Corbie in Picardy, Hirschau, Braunweiler, Deutz, Ilsenburg, Liesborn, Pram, and Fulda; those of the Cistercians at Arnsberg, Baumgarten, Eberbach, Himmenrode, Herrnalb, Volkenrode, and Walkenried.

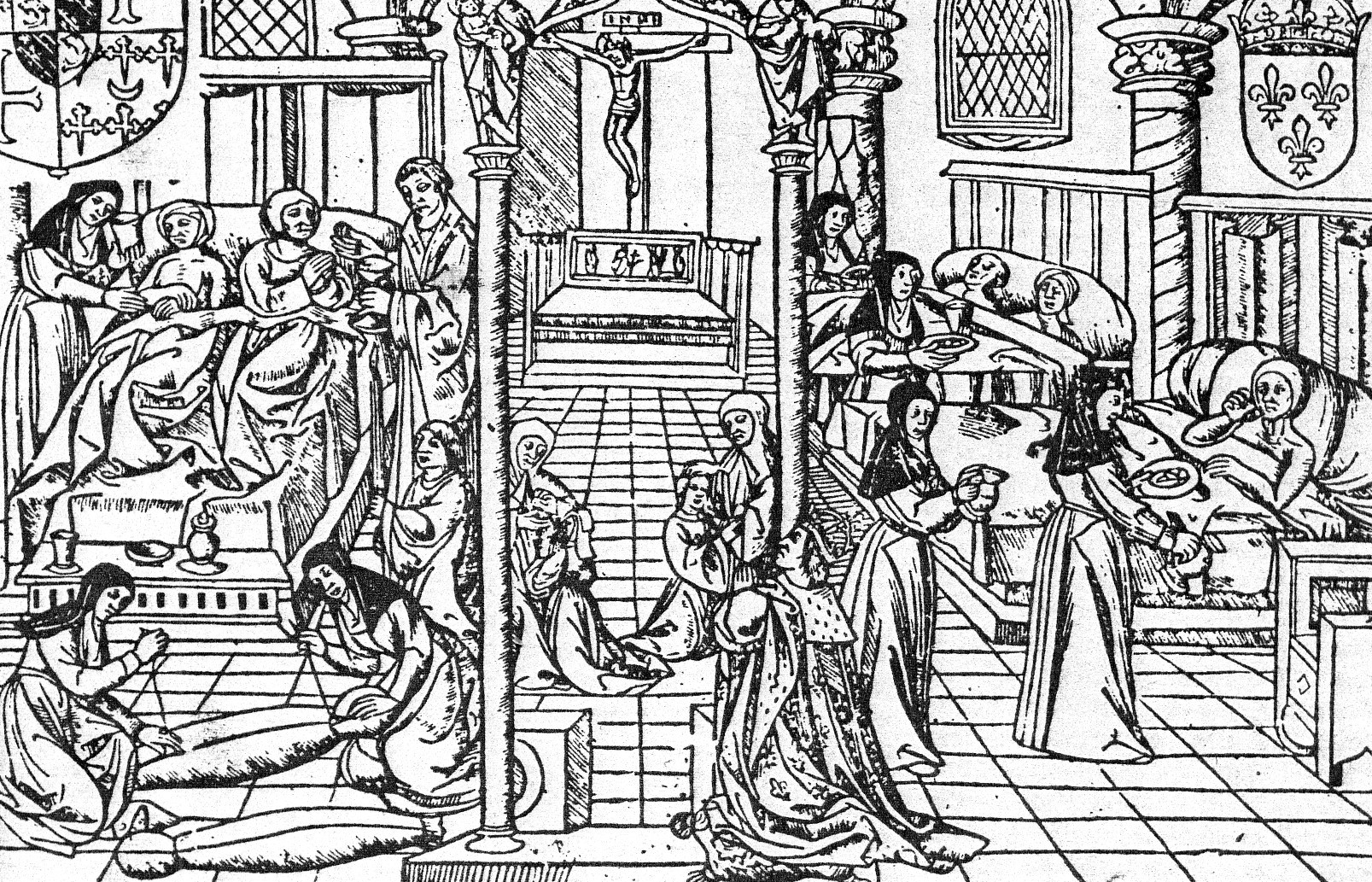
Hôtel-Dieu de Paris c. 1500. The comparatively well patients (on the right) were separated from the very ill (on the left).

No less efficient was the work done by the diocesan clergy in accordance with the disciplinary enactments of the councils of Aachen (817, 836), which prescribed that a hospital should be maintained in connection with each collegiate church. The canons were obliged to contribute towards the support of the hospital, and one of their number had charge of the inmates. As these hospitals were located in cities, more numerous demands were made upon them than upon those attached to the monasteries. In this movement the bishop naturally took the lead, hence the hospitals founded by Heribert of Cologne (d. 1021) in Cologne, Godard (d. 1038) in Hildesheim, Conrad (d. 975) in Constance, and Ulrich (d. 973) in Augsburg. But similar provision was made by the other churches; thus at Trier the hospitals of Saint Maximin, Saint Matthew, Saint Simeon, and Saint James took their names from the churches to which they were attached. During the period 1207–1577 no less than one hundred and fifty-five hospitals were founded in Germany.

The Ospedale Maggiore, traditionally named Ca' Granda (i.e. Big House), in Milan, northern Italy, was constructed to house one of the first community hospitals, the largest such undertaking of the fifteenth century. Commissioned by Francesco Sforza in 1456 and designed by Antonio Filarete it is among the first examples of Renaissance architecture in Lombardy.

The Normans brought their hospital system along when they conquered England in 1066. By merging with traditional land-tenure and customs, the new charitable houses became popular and were distinct from both English monasteries and French hospitals. They dispensed alms and some medicine, and were generously endowed by the nobility and gentry who counted on them for spiritual rewards after death.

=== Late medieval European hospitals ===
The Hospitaller Order of St. John of Jerusalem, founded in 1099 (The Knights of Malta) itself has – as its raison d'être – the founding of a hospital for pilgrims to the Holy Land. In Europe, Spanish hospitals are particularly noteworthy examples of Christian virtue as expressed through care for the sick, and were usually attached to a monastery in a ward-chapel configuration, most often erected in the shape of a cross. This style reached a high point during the hospital building campaign of Portuguese St. John of God in the sixteenth-century, the founder of the Hospitaller Order of the Brothers of John of God.

Soon many monasteries were founded throughout Europe, and everywhere there were hospitals like in Monte Cassino. By the 11th century, some monasteries were training their own physicians. Ideally, such physicians would uphold the Christianized ideal of the healer who offered mercy and charity towards all patients and soldiers, whatever their status and prognosis might be. In the 6th–12th centuries the Benedictines established many monk communities of this type. And later, in the 12th–13th centuries the Benedictines order built a network of independent hospitals, initially to provide general care to the sick and wounded and then for treatment of syphilis and isolation of patients with communicable disease. The hospital movement spread through Europe in the subsequent centuries, with a 225-bed hospital being built at York in 1287 and even larger facilities established at Florence, Paris, Milan, Siena, and other medieval big European cities. In 1120 a man named Rahere fell ill with malaria in Rome: he was taken care of by the monks of the small hospital near the church of San Bartolomeo, on the Tiber Island, and took a vow to found a hospital in case he was cured. Effectively cured, in 1123 he founded a small hospital for the poor outside London: it was the first nucleus of the famous St Bartholomew's Hospital, still active today, commonly called "Bart".

In the North during the late Saxon period, monasteries, nunneries, and hospitals functioned mainly as a site of charity to the poor. After the Norman Conquest of 1066, hospitals are found to be autonomous, freestanding institutions. They dispensed alms and some medicine, and were generously endowed by the nobility and gentry who counted on them for spiritual rewards after death. In time, hospitals became popular charitable houses that were distinct from both English monasteries and French hospitals.

The primary function of medieval hospitals was to worship to God. Most hospitals contained one chapel, at least one clergyman, and inmates that were expected to help with prayer. Worship was often a higher priority than care and was a large part of hospital life until and long after the Reformation. Worship in medieval hospitals served as a way of alleviating ailments of the sick and insuring their salvation when relief from sickness could not be achieved.

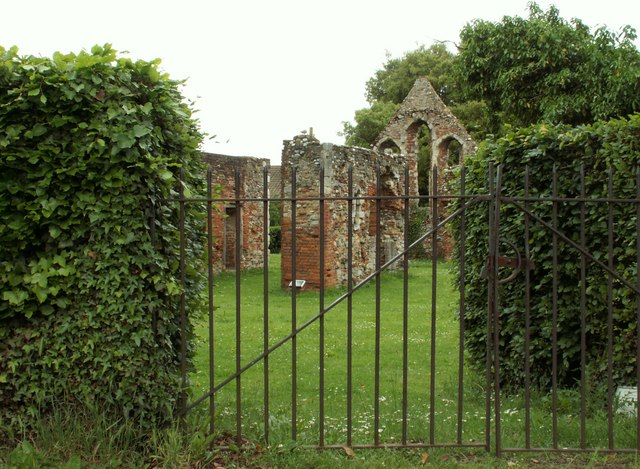
Ruins of St. Giles Hospital (Great Hospital)

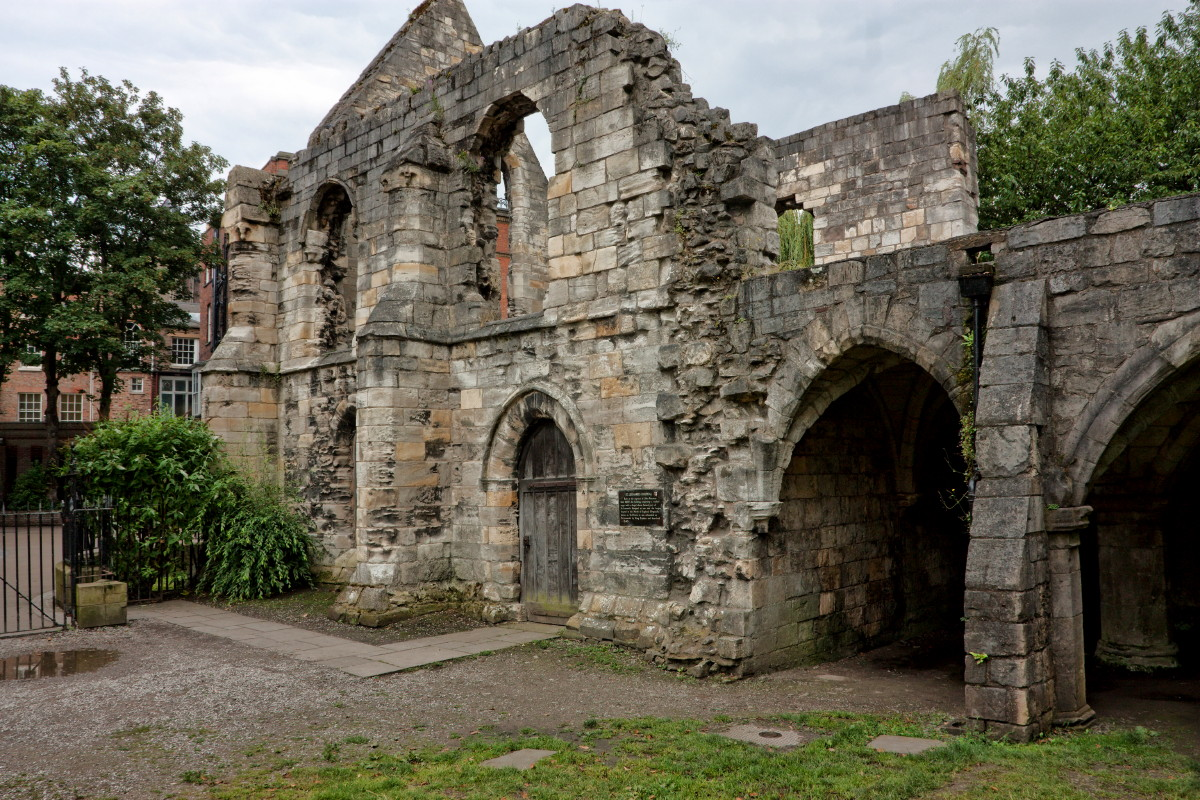
Ruins of St Leonard's Hospital.

The secondary function of medieval hospitals was charity to the poor, sick, and travellers. Charity provided by hospitals surfaced in different ways, including long-term maintenance of the infirm, medium-term care of the sick, short-term hospitality to travellers, and regular distribution of alms to the poor. Though these were general acts of charity among medieval hospitals, the degree of charity was variable. For example, some institutions that perceived themselves mainly as a religious house or place of hospitality turned away the sick or dying in fear that difficult healthcare will distract from worship. Others, however, such as St. James of Northallerton, St. Giles Hospital of Norwich, and St. Leonard's Hospital of York, contained specific ordinances stating they must cater to the sick and that "all who entered with ill health should be allowed to stay until they recovered or died". The study of these three hospitals provides insight into the diet, medical care, cleanliness and daily life in a medieval hospital of Europe.

The tertiary function of medieval hospitals was to support education and learning. Originally, hospitals educated chaplains and priestly brothers in literacy and history; however, by the 13th century, some hospitals became involved in the education of impoverished boys and young adults. Soon after, hospitals began to provide food and shelter for scholars within the hospital in return for helping with chapel worship.

== 16th and 17th centuries ==
Notable hospitals in the 16th and 17th centuries with articles in Wikipedia

16th (19)	17th (22)

=== Early modern Europe ===
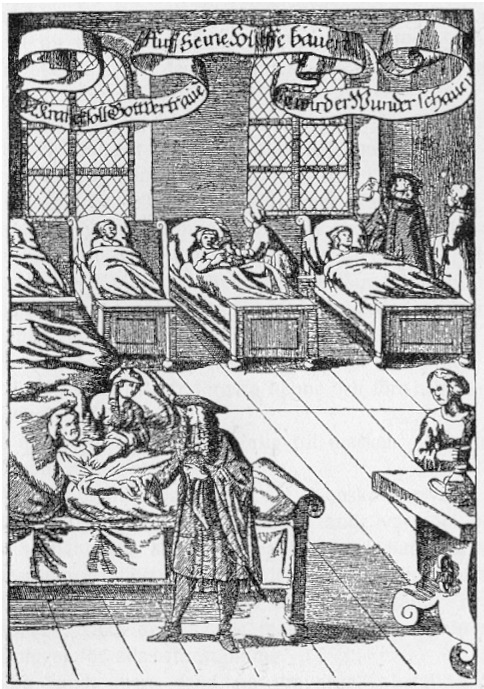
A physician visiting the sick in a hospital, German engraving from 1682

In Europe the medieval concept of Christian care evolved during the sixteenth and seventeenth centuries into a secular one. Theology was the problem. The Protestant reformers rejected the Catholic belief that rich men could gain God's grace through good works – and escape purgatory – by providing endowments to charitable institutions, and that the patients themselves could gain grace through their suffering.

After the dissolution of the monasteries in 1540 by King Henry VIII the church abruptly ceased to be the supporter of hospitals, and only by direct petition from the citizens of London, were the hospitals St Bartholomew's, St Thomas's and St Mary of Bethlehem's (Bedlam) endowed directly by the crown. It was at St. Bartholomew that William Harvey conducted his research on the circulatory system in the 17th century, Percivall Pott and John Abernethy developed important principles of modern surgery in the 18th century, and Mrs. Bedford Fenwich worked to advance the nursing profession in the late 19th century.

There were 28 asylums in Sweden at the start of the Reformation. Gustav Vasa removed them from church control and expelled the monks and nuns, but allowed the asylums to keep their properties and to continue their activities under the auspices of local government.

In much of Europe town governments operated small Holy Spirit hospitals, which had been founded in the 13th and 14th centuries. They distributed free food and clothing to the poor, provided for homeless women and children, and gave some medical and nursing care. Many were raided and closed during the Thirty Years War (1618–48), which ravaged the towns and villages of Germany and neighboring areas for three decades.

In Denmark, the beginnings of modern hospital care started during the Scanian War (1675–79) when Denmark suffered disastrous losses. Five government-run hospitals were founded around the Sound: one at Elsinore, two at Copenhagen, one at Landskrona and one at Helsingborg. The one at Landskrona was based on the old Holy Spirit institution but now it was modernised and enlarged. One of the two Copenhagen institutions was placed in a former plague hospital. The government spent vast sums on equipment, from bone saws to beds and staff. Women nursed the wounded and sick soldiers on a day-to-day basis but men were always head of these hospitals. They had various surgeons and physicians, but never enough of them. The meals were based on porridge, herring, beer and peas. After Denmark lost the war, Helsingborg and Landskrona were surrendered to the Swedes but the hospitals in Elsinore and Copenhagen continued their work.

Meanwhile, in Catholic lands such as France and Italy, rich families continued to fund convents and monasteries that provided free health services to the poor. French practices were influenced by a charitable imperative which considered care of the poor and the sick to be a necessary part of Catholic practice. The nursing nuns had little faith in the power of physicians and their medicines alone to cure the sick; more important was providing psychological and physical comfort, nourishment, rest, cleanliness and especially prayer.

In Protestant areas the emphasis was on scientific rather than religious aspects of patient care, and this helped develop a view of nursing as a profession rather than a vocation. There was little hospital development by the main Protestant churches after 1530. Some smaller groups such as the Moravians and the Pietists at Halle gave a role for hospitals, especially in missionary work.

=== Colonial Americas ===
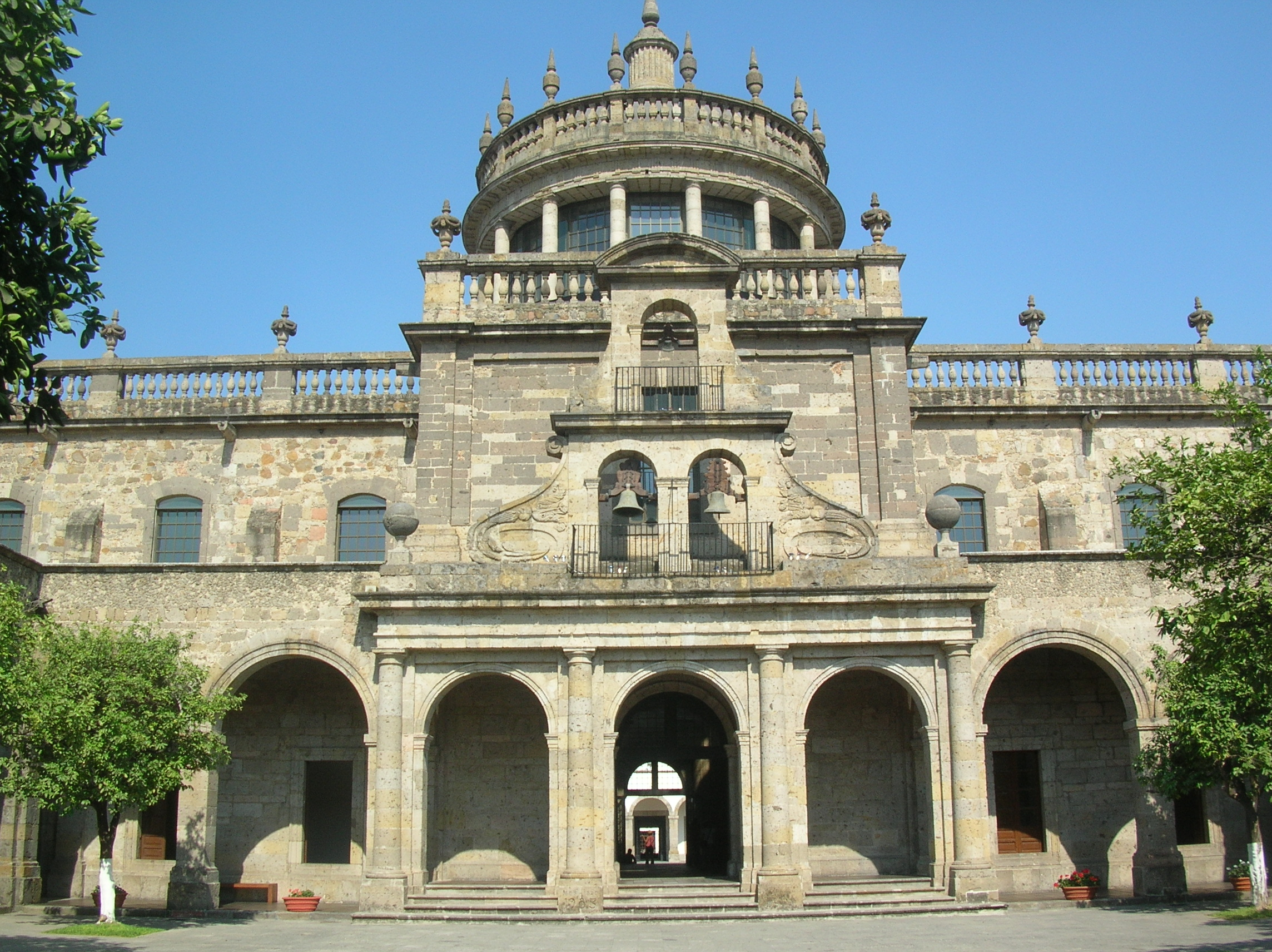
Hospicio Cabañas was the largest hospital in colonial America, in Guadalajara, Mexico

The first hospital founded in the Americas was the Hospital San Nicolás de Bari in Santo Domingo, Distrito Nacional Dominican Republic. Fray Nicolás de Ovando, Spanish governor and colonial administrator from 1502 to 1509, authorized its construction on December 29, 1503. This hospital apparently incorporated a church. The first phase of its construction was completed in 1519, and it was rebuilt in 1552. Abandoned in the mid-18th century, the hospital now lies in ruins near the Basilica Cathedral of Santa María la Menor in Santo Domingo.

Conquistador Hernán Cortés founded the two earliest hospitals in North America: the Immaculate Conception Hospital and the Saint Lazarus Hospital. The oldest was the Immaculate Conception, now the Hospital de Jesús Nazareno in Mexico City, founded in 1524 to care for the poor.

In Quebec, Catholics operated hospitals continuously from the 1640s; they attracted nuns from the provincial elite. Jeanne Mance (1606–73) founded Montreal's city's first hospital, the Hôtel-Dieu de Montréal, in 1645. In 1657 she recruited three sisters of the Religious Hospitallers of St. Joseph, and continued to direct operations of the hospital. The project, begun by the niece of Cardinal de Richelieu was granted a royal charter by King Louis XIII and staffed by a colonial physician, Robert Giffard de Moncel. The General Hospital in Quebec City opened in 1692. They often handled malaria, dysentery, and respiratory sickness.

== 18th century ==
In the 18th century, under the influence of the Age of Enlightenment, the modern hospital began to appear, serving only medical needs and staffed with trained physicians and surgeons. The nurses were untrained workers. The goal was to use modern methods to cure patients. They provided more narrow medical services, and were founded by the secular authorities. A clearer distinction emerged between medicine and poor relief. Within the hospitals, acute cases were increasingly treated alone, and separate departments were set up for different categories of patient.

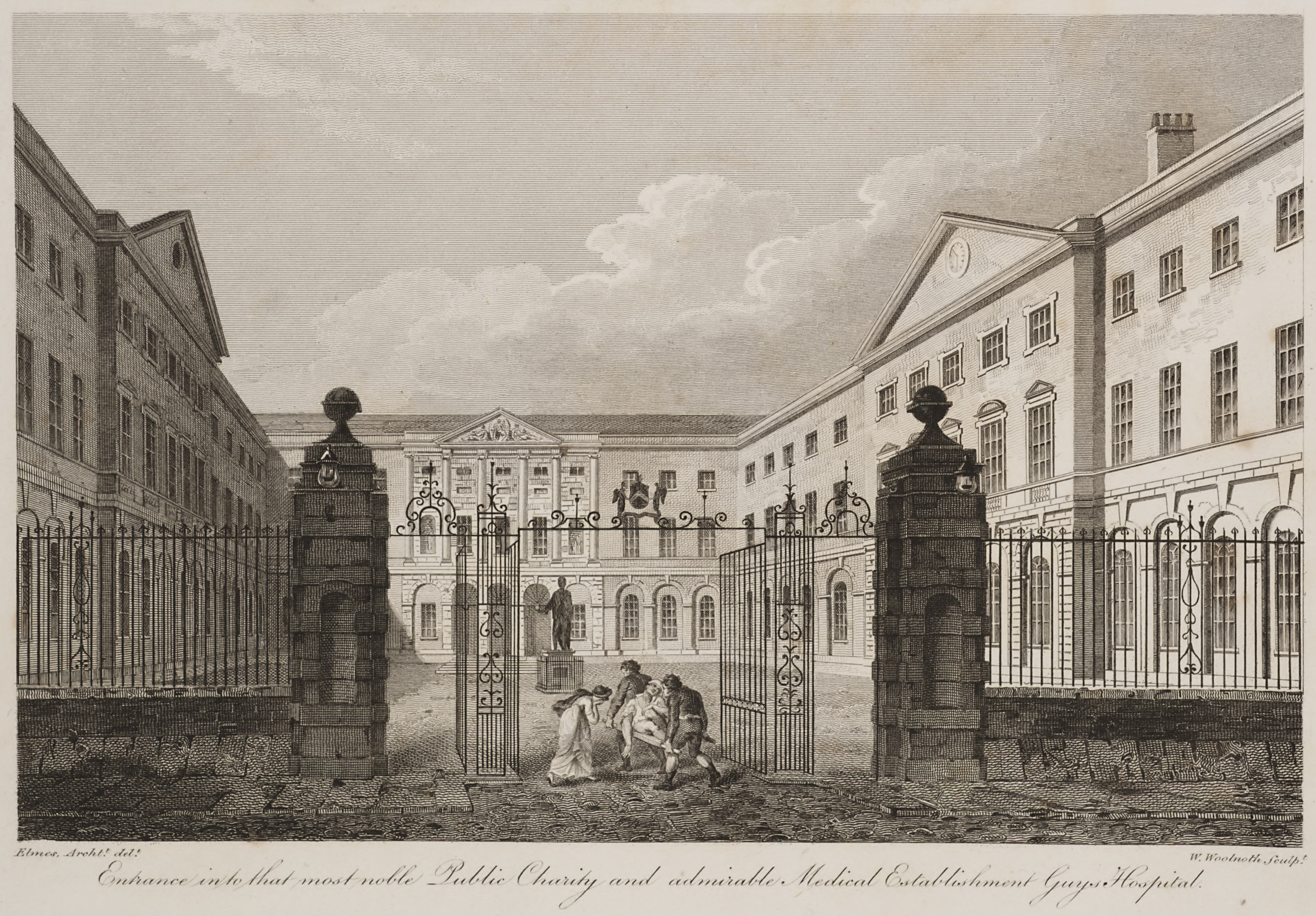
1820 Engraving of Guy's Hospital in London one of the first voluntary hospitals to be established in 1724.

The voluntary hospital movement began in the early 18th century, with hospitals being founded in London by the 1710s and 20s, including Westminster Hospital (1719) promoted by the private bank C. Hoare & Co and Guy's Hospital (1724) funded from the bequest of the wealthy merchant, Thomas Guy. Other hospitals sprang up in London and other British cities over the century, many paid for by private subscriptions. St. Bartholomew's in London was rebuilt in 1730, and the London Hospital opened in 1752.

These hospitals represented a turning point in the function of the institution; they began to evolve from being basic places of care for the sick to becoming centres of medical innovation and discovery and the principal place for the education and training of prospective practitioners. Some of the era's greatest surgeons and doctors worked and passed on their knowledge at the hospitals. They also changed from being mere homes of refuge to being complex institutions for the provision of medicine and care for sick. The Charité was founded in Berlin in 1710 by King Frederick I of Prussia as a response to an outbreak of plague.

The concept of voluntary hospitals also spread to Colonial America; the Bellevue Hospital opened in 1736, Pennsylvania Hospital in 1752, New York Hospital in 1771, and Massachusetts General Hospital in 1811. When the Vienna General Hospital opened in 1784 (instantly becoming the world's largest hospital), physicians acquired a new facility that gradually developed into one of the most important research centres.

Another Enlightenment era charitable innovation was the dispensary; these would issue the poor with medicines free of charge. The London Dispensary opened its doors in 1696 as the first such clinic in the British Empire. The idea was slow to catch on until the 1770s, when many such organizations began to appear, including the Public Dispensary of Edinburgh (1776), the Metropolitan Dispensary and Charitable Fund (1779) and the Finsbury Dispensary (1780). Dispensaries were also opened in New York 1771, Philadelphia 1786, and Boston 1796.

Across Europe medical schools still relied primarily on lectures and readings. In the final year, students would have limited clinical experience by following the professor through the wards. Laboratory work was uncommon, and dissections were rarely done because of legal restrictions on cadavers. Most schools were small, and only Edinburgh, Scotland, with 11,000 alumni, produced large numbers of graduates.

== 19th century ==
=== United Kingdom ===
English physician Thomas Percival (1740–1804) wrote a comprehensive system of medical conduct, Medical Ethics; or, a Code of Institutes and Precepts, Adapted to the Professional Conduct of Physicians and Surgeons (1803) that set the standard for many textbooks.

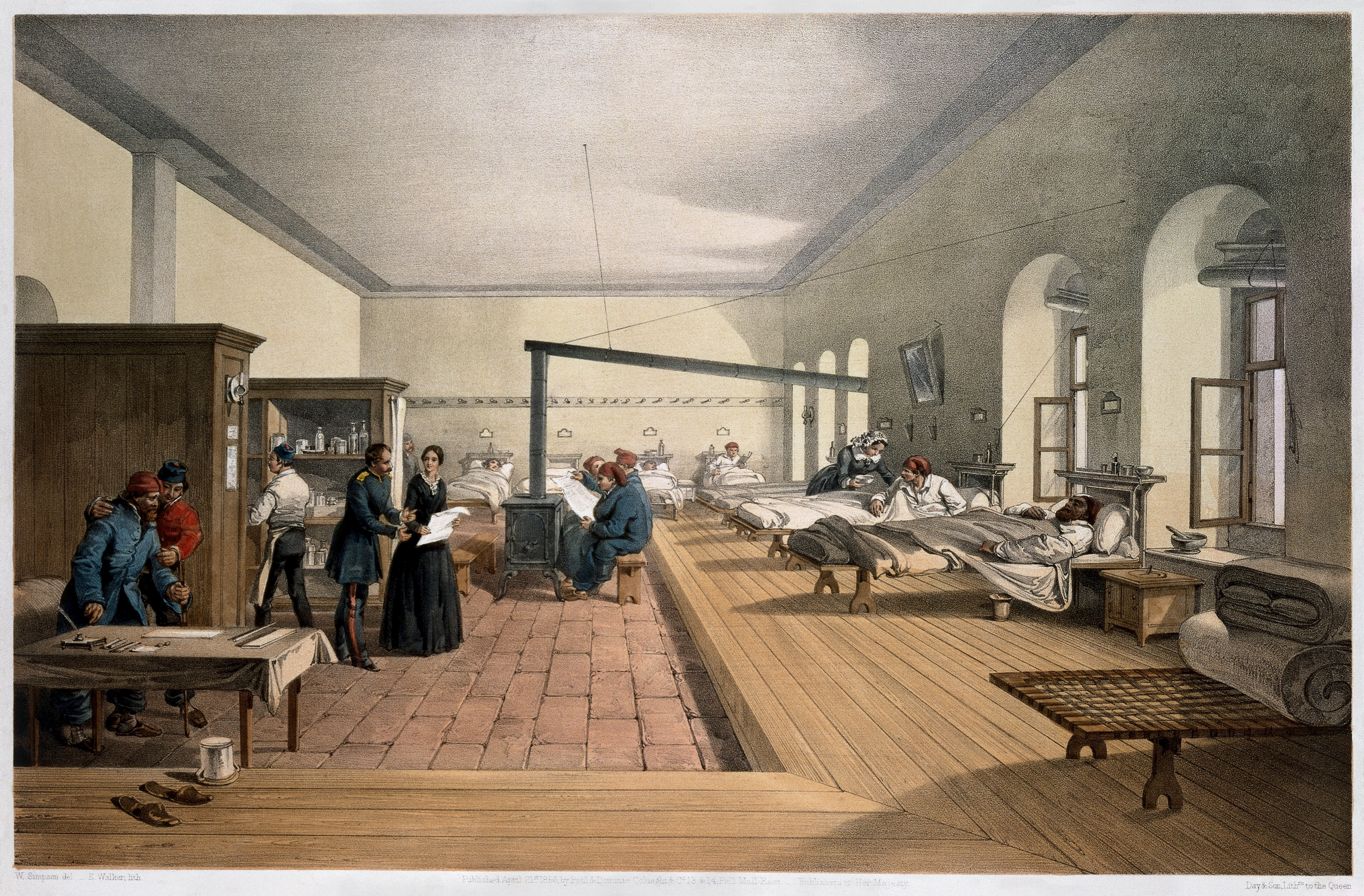
A ward of the hospital at Scutari where Florence Nightingale worked and helped to restructure the modern hospital.

In the mid 19th century, hospitals and the medical profession became more professionalized, with a reorganization of hospital management along more bureaucratic and administrative lines. The Apothecaries Act 1815 made it compulsory for medical students to practice for at least half a year at a hospital as part of their training. An example of this professionalization was the Charing Cross Hospital, set up in 1818 as the 'West London Infirmary and Dispensary' from funds provided by Dr. Benjamin Golding. By 1821 it was treating nearly 10,000 patients a year, and it was relocated to larger quarters near Charing Cross in the heart of London. Its Charing Cross Hospital Medical School opened in 1822. It expanded several times and 1866 added a professional nursing staff.

Florence Nightingale pioneered the modern profession of nursing during the Crimean War when she set an example of compassion, commitment to patient care and diligent and thoughtful hospital administration. The first official nurses' training programme, the Nightingale School for Nurses, was opened in 1860, with the mission of training nurses to work in hospitals, to work with the poor and to teach.

Nightingale was instrumental in reforming the nature of the hospital, by improving sanitation standards and changing the image of the hospital from a place the sick would go to die, to an institution devoted to recuperation and healing. She also emphasized the importance of statistical measurement for determining the success rate of a given intervention and pushed for administrative reform at hospitals.

The National Health Service, the principal provider of health care in Britain, was founded in 1948, and took control of nearly all the hospitals.

=== Continental Europe ===
During the middle of the 19th century, the Second Viennese Medical School emerged with the contributions of physicians such as Carl Freiherr von Rokitansky, Josef Škoda, Ferdinand Ritter von Hebra, and Ignaz Philipp Semmelweis. Basic medical science expanded and specialization advanced. Furthermore, the first dermatology, eye, as well as ear, nose, and throat clinics in the world were founded in Vienna.

In Rome, where hospitality was highly patrimonial thanks to a long tradition of bequests and substantial donations (Spedalità romane), with a royal decree in 1896 the vast hospital patrimony was centralized in a single body: the Pio Istituto di Santo Spirito and Ospedali Riuniti, which thus became the largest in Europe.

By the late 19th century, the modern hospital was beginning to take shape with a proliferation of a variety of public and private hospital systems. By the 1870s, hospitals had more than tripled their original average intake of 3,000 patients. In continental Europe the new hospitals generally were built and run from public funds.

=== France ===
Nursing was professionalized in France by the turn of the 20th century. At that time, the country's 1,500 hospitals were operated by 15,000 nuns representing over 200 religious orders. Government policy after 1900 was to secularize public institutions, and diminish the role the Catholic Church. This political goal came in conflict with the need to maintain better quality of medical care in antiquated facilities. New government-operated nursing schools turned out nonreligious nurses who were slated for supervisory roles. During the First World War, an outpouring of patriotic volunteers brought large numbers of untrained middle-class women into the military hospitals. They left when the war ended but the long-term effect was to heighten the prestige of nursing. In 1922 the government issued a national diploma for nursing.

At the turn of the 19th century, Paris medicine played a significant role in shaping clinical medicine. New emphasis on physically examining the body led to methods such as percussion, inspection, palpation, auscultation, and autopsy. The situation in Paris was particularly unique due to the fact that there was a very large concentration of medical professionals in a very small setting allowing for a large flow of ideas and the spread of innovation. One of the innovations to come out of the Paris hospital setting was Laennec's stethoscope. Weiner states that the widespread acceptance of the stethoscope would likely not have happened in any other setting, and the setting allowed for Laennec to pass on this technology to the eager medical community that had gathered there. This invention also brought even more attention to the Paris scene.

Before the start of the 19th century, there were many problems existing within the French medical system. These problems were outlined by many seeking to reform hospitals including a contemporary surgeon Jacques Tenon in his book Memoirs on Paris Hospitals. Some of the problems Tenon drew attention to were the lack of space, the inability to separate patients based on the type of illness (including those that were contagious), and general sanitation problems. Additionally, the secular revolution led to the nationalization of hospitals previously owned by the Catholic Church and led to a call for a hospital reform which actually pushed for the deinstitutionalization of medicine. This contributed to the state of disarray Paris hospitals soon fell into which ultimately called for the establishment of a new hospital system outlined in the law of 1794. The law of 1794 played a significant part in revolutionizing Paris Medicine because it aimed to address some of the problems facing Paris Hospitals of the time.

First, the law of 1794 created three new schools in Paris, Montpellier, and Strasbourg due to the lack of medical professionals available to treat a growing French army. It also gave physicians and surgeons equal status in the hospital environment, whereas previously physicians were regarded as intellectually superior. This led to the integration of surgery into traditional medical education contributing to a new breed of doctors that focused on pathology, anatomy and diagnosis. The new focus on anatomy was further facilitated by this law because it ensured that medical students had enough bodies to dissect. Additionally, pathological education was furthered by the increased use of autopsies to determine a patient's cause of death. Lastly, the law of 1794 allocated funds for full-time salaried teachers in hospitals, as well as creating scholarships for medical students. Overall, the law of 1794 contributed to the shift of medical teaching away from theory and towards practice and experience, all within a hospital setting. Hospitals became a center for learning and development of medical techniques, which was a departure from the previous notion of a hospital as an area that accepted people who needed help of any kind, ill or not. This shift was consistent with much of the philosophy of the time, particularly the ideas of John Locke who preached that observation using ones senses was the best way to analyze and understand a phenomenon. Foucalt, however, criticized this shift in his book The Birth of the Clinic, stating that this shift took attention away from the patient and objectified patients, ultimately resulting in a loss of the patient's narrative. He argued that from this point forward, in the eyes of doctors, patients lost their humanity and became more like objects for inspection and examination.

The next advancement in Paris medicine came with the creation of an examination system, that after 1803, was required for the licensing of all medical professions creating a uniform and centralized system of licensing. This law also created another class of health professionals, mostly for those living outside of cities, who did not have to go through the licensing process but instead went through a simpler and shorter training process.

Another area influenced by Paris hospitals was the development of specialties. The structure of a Paris hospital allowed physicians more freedom to pursue interests as well as providing the necessary resources. An example of a physician who used this flexibility to conduct research is Phillipe Pinel who conducted a four-year study on the hospitalization and treatment of mentally-ill women within the Salpêtriére hospital. This was the first study ever done of this magnitude by a physician, and the Pinel was the first to realize that patients dealing with similar illnesses could be group together, compared, and classified.

=== Protestant hospitals ===
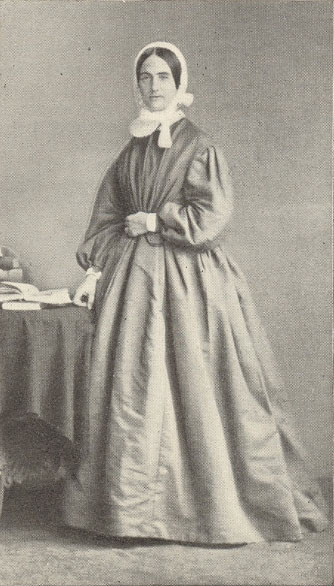
Elizabeth Catherine Ferard, first deaconess of the Church of England.

The Protestant churches reentered the health field in the 19th century, especially with the establishment of orders of women, called deaconesses who dedicated themselves to nursing services. This movement began in Germany in 1836 when Theodor Fliedner and his wife opened the first deaconess motherhouse in Kaiserswerth on the Rhine. It became a model, and within half a century there were over 5,000 deaconesses in Europe. Lutheran minister William Passavant in 1849 brought the first four deaconesses to Pittsburgh, in the United States, after visiting Kaiserswerth. They worked at the Pittsburgh Infirmary (now Passavant Hospital).

The Church of England named its first deaconess in 1862. The North London Deaconess Institution trained deaconesses for other dioceses and some served overseas.

=== China ===
Traditionally, Chinese medicine relied on small private clinics and individual healers until the middle of the 18th century when missionary hospitals operated by western churches were first established in China. In 1870, the Tung Wah Hospital became the first hospital to offer Traditional Chinese Medicine. After the cultural revolution in 1949, most Chinese hospitals became public.

=== United States ===
American hospitals in the 19th century were largely designed for poor people in the larger cities. There were no paying patients. Very small proprietary hospitals were operated by practicing physicians and surgeons to take care of their own paying patients in better facilities than the charity hospitals offered. By the 1840s, the major religious denominations, especially the Catholics and Methodists, began opening hospitals in major cities. The South had small hospitals in its few cities. In the rich plantation areas, slave owners hired physicians to keep their slaves in working shape. In the poor white areas there were few doctors and very few hospitals.

In the U.S., the number of hospitals reached 4400 in 1910, when they provided 420,000 beds. These were operated by city, state and federal agencies, by churches, by stand-alone non-profits, and by for-profit enterprises. Non-profit hospitals were supplemented by large public hospitals in major cities and research hospitals often affiliated with a medical school. The largest public hospital system in America is the New York City Health and Hospitals Corporation, which includes Bellevue Hospital, the oldest U.S. hospital, affiliated with New York University Medical School.

==== New York City ====
According to historian Mike Wallace, in the early 20th century, a significant shift occurred in New York City's private hospitals. In 1911 came the partnership of Presbyterian Hospital with Columbia University College of Physicians and Surgeons, In 1912 New York Hospital forged its own alliance with Cornell University Medical College. These collaborations marked a pivot towards medical education and scientific research, fundamentally altering how these institutions operated and who they served. Previously, 19th-century religious and charitable hospitals functioned much like public ones, primarily caring for the sick poor. Their focus was on care rather than cures, with little integration of medical practice. Wallace argues that the emergence of scientific medicine changed everything. Improved antiseptic practices made hospitals the ideal location for surgery, as medical advancements rendered home operations increasingly difficult. Hospitals offered doctors crucial technical resources and supported their professional independence. They also employed trained assistants, often women, who helped physicians efficiently treat more patients. This evolution solidified hospitals as central hubs for medical practice. Despite receiving funding from corporate philanthropists for new facilities, hospitals faced escalating operational costs. To remain viable, they began targeting wealthier patients, who had previously only sought hospital care in emergencies. To attract this new clientele, hospital boards redesigned their institutions to mimic luxury hotels. For example, Roosevelt Hospital marketed its private patients' pavilion as a refined choice for individuals with "the most cultivated tastes."

==== Chicago ====
The history of hospitals in Chicago is rich with innovation, diversity, and rapid growth, reflecting the city's development as a major medical center. Before the emergence of modern hospitals, Chicago relied on a neighborhood based dispensary system to provide medical help for poor people without charge.

Before the 1870s, hospitals had a bad reputation. Poor people went there to die, even those who were not fatally ill when they arrived. Bad sanitation on the part of doctors spread disease inside the hospital. Finally.the discovery of the germ theory of disease produced an immediate transition to concerns with sanitation. and cleanliness. After the Great Fire of 1871, Chicago's hospital system grew rapidly in response to the city's burgeoning population. The city's first hospital was built in 1843 in response to epidemic fears. Vaccination programs for the poor began in 1848. Specialized facilities were created for specific health crises, such as smallpox and cholera. The expansion was characterized by steady increases of bed capacity to meet growing demand; specialization to serve specific communities and medical needs; and the development of new facilities and technologies.

In 1927 and 1928—years of peak prosperity—numerous hospitals expanded or were newly built, including Mercy Hospital (now part of Insight Hospital and Medical Center), Passavant Memorial Hospital (now part of Northwestern Memorial Hospital, and Edgewater Hospital. In 1916 the University of Chicago obtained funding for. an independent academic medical school effort with a teaching hospital. The facility opened in 1927 and is now the Pritzker School of Medicine.

The late 20th century saw significant changes in hospital operations and funding, By 1950, Chicago had 84 hospitals serving a population of 3.6 million. They increasingly focused on attracting paying patients with improved amenities and services. Since 1965 Medicare and Medicaid and other federal programs dramatically expanded spending on health nationwide. As the stockyards closed and old manufacturing industries faded away, health spending increasingly dominated the Chicago economy.

==== Religious hospitals ====
All the major denominations built hospitals; the 541 Catholic ones (in 1915) were staffed primarily by unpaid nuns. The others sometimes had a small cadre of deaconesses as staff. The American Methodists made medical services a priority from the 1850s. They began opening charitable institutions such as orphanages and old people's homes. In the 1880s, Methodists began opening hospitals in the United States, which served people of all religious beliefs. By 1895, 13 hospitals were in operation in major cities.

In the 1840s–1880s era, Catholics in Philadelphia founded two hospitals, for the Irish and German Catholics. They depended on revenues from the paying sick, and became important health and welfare institutions in the Catholic community. By 1900 the Catholics had set up hospitals in most major cities. In New York the Dominicans, Franciscans, Sisters of Charity, and other orders set up hospitals to care primarily for their own ethnic group. By the 1920s they were serving everyone in the neighborhood. In smaller cities too the Catholics set up hospitals, such as St. Patrick Hospital in Missoula, Montana. The Sisters of Providence opened it in 1873. It was in part funded by the county contract to care for the poor, and also operated a day school and a boarding school. The nuns provided nursing care especially for infectious diseases and traumatic injuries among the young, heavily male clientele. They also proselytized the patients to attract converts and restore lapsed Catholics back into the Church. They built a larger hospital in 1890. Catholic hospitals were largely staffed by Catholic orders of nuns, and nursing students, until the population of nuns dropped sharply after the 1960s. The Catholic Hospital Association formed in 1915.

== Integration of new technology and advancements ==
=== Anesthetics ===
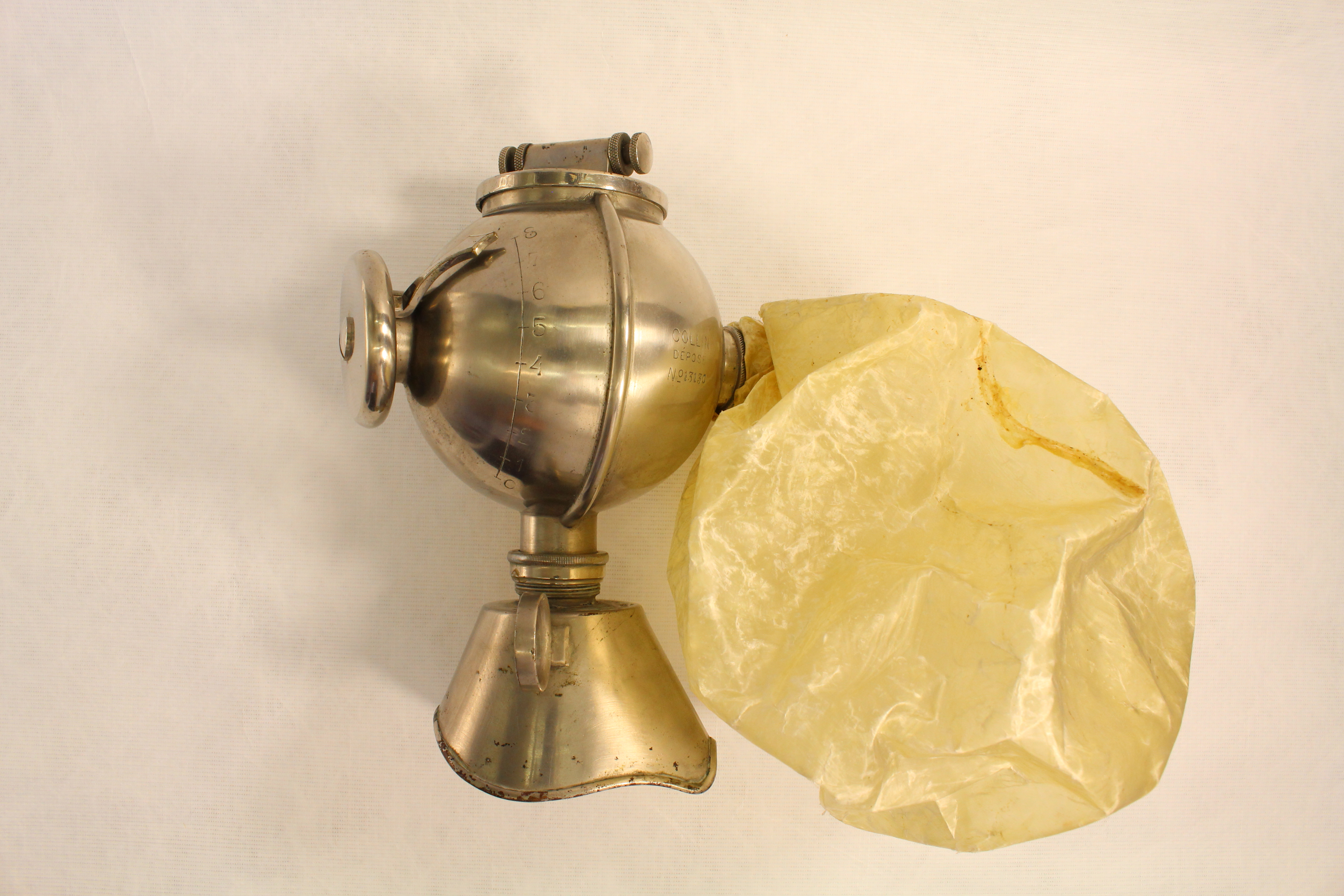
Device used to administer anesthetics through the mouth using an air pump system.

A major change to procedures in the medical field was the introduction of anesthetics used to put patients to sleep. While the use of anesthetics was first introduced in the 19th century, it became a favorable and widely used practice due to its ability to incapacitate a patient and make operations easier and less painful. This, in turn, made operations such as amputations less fatal, because patients would stay still as well as not be in shock and lose less blood while being operated on.

On November 7, 1846, the first amputation using a form of anesthesia called ether anesthesia was performed. This anesthetic was called letheon and was created by a dentist, Dr. William Morton. This new, ether based anesthetic was administered to Alice Mohan in an amputation procedure to, first, subdue her during the amputation and second, to test the effects of the new letheon. After being given to Alice Mohan, the anesthetic reportedly only took three minutes to take full effect. The amputation was carried out with little reaction from Alice Mohan, and she seemed completely unaffected by pain and outside stimuli until a static nerve was cut, when a small cry was noticed. There was also only a small amount of blood lost during the operation.

==== Antisepsis ====
Another big change to the medical world was the introduction of the idea of germ theory. Germ theory is the idea that disease is caused by microscopic living organisms being introduced to the body. Joseph Lister was able to apply germ theory to medical practice and tried to show that germ theory should be taken seriously. This was not widely accepted at first due to the fact that Lister was determining that airborne germs were infecting open wounds, and it was not believed that this could be a single cause of infection. Through experimentation, Louis Pasteur was able to determine that living organisms are the cause of fermentation, and demonstrated that the spread and growth of septicemia was dependent on a living microorganism. Joseph Lister applied this idea to surgeries and used a carbolic acid solution to attempt to sterilize anything that would be on our around a wound. This method proved to be successful when Lister pointed out that, despite his patients, in most cases, being in a tighter space than standard wards, there was still a very low infection rate among them since he began using his methods.

== 20th century ==
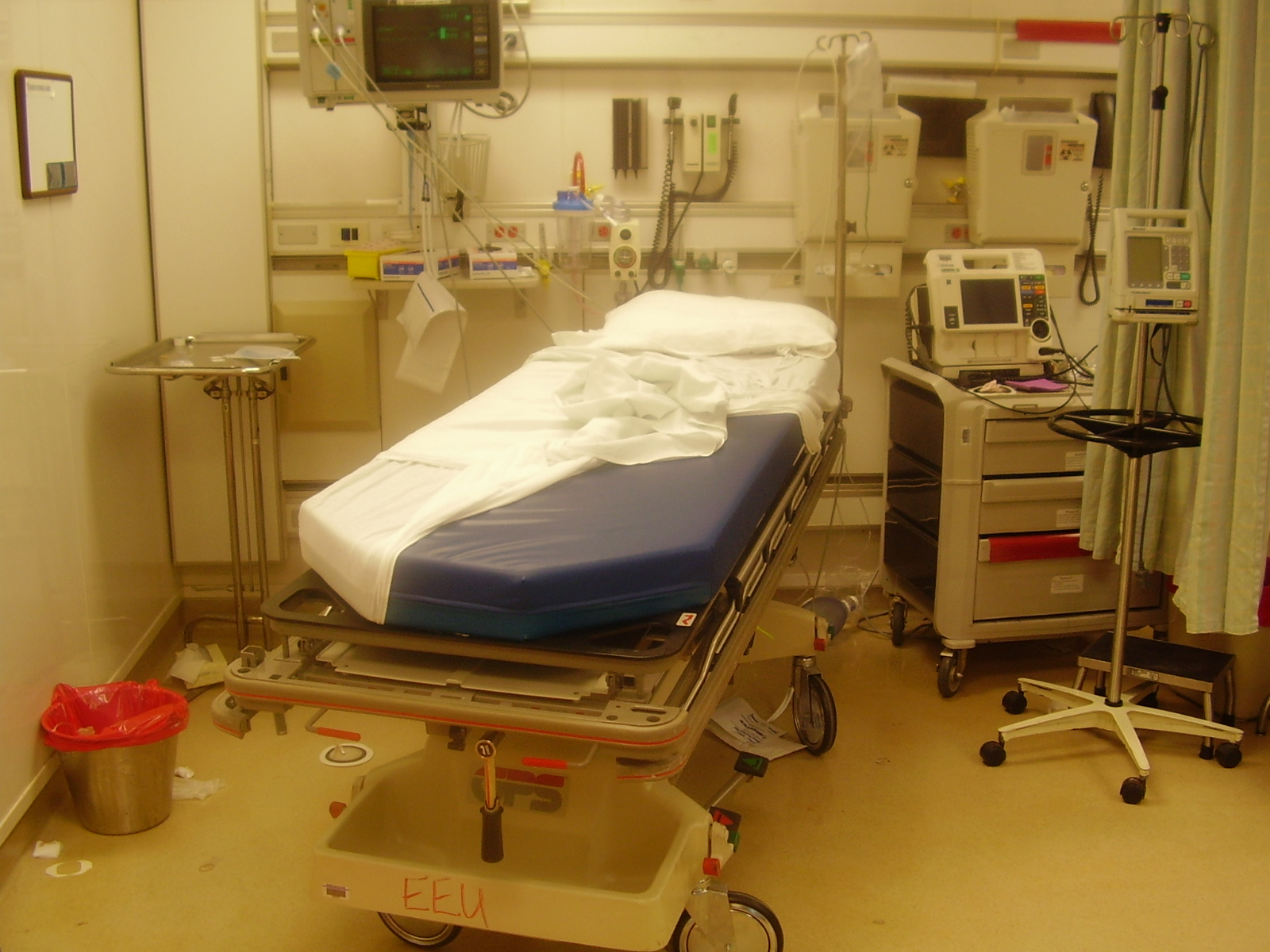
Resuscitation room bed after a trauma intervention, showing the highly technical equipment of modern hospitals

Following the rapid growth of American cities in the 1870s, demand for centralized care rose and with it came fourth voluntary hospitals. Inspired by religion or charity, voluntary hospitals became admired for their nobility. Being private, financial support was drawn from politicians and businessmen hoping to earn favor from the public for their generosity. With the capacity to expand, hospitals began to compete for patients in part through a greater number of services using advancements in medical technology made in 20th century.

=== Integration of new technology and advancements ===
==== X-ray ====
In the year after the discovery of x-ray in 1895, many experiments were conducted to serve medical results including during a surgery by John Hall-Edwards and over a fracture in Eddie McCarthy's wrist by Gilman and Edward Frost. Hospitals all over the world grabbed onto the new technology. In January 1896, the Glasgow Royal Infirmary in Scotland is credited with having the first radiology department, headed by Dr. John Macintyre. In America, the Pennsylvania Hospital in Philadelphia purchased an X-ray machine in 1897.

== See also ==
- Byzantine medicine
- History of medicine
- History of public health in the United States
- History of public health in the United Kingdom
- List of the oldest hospitals in the United States
- Medieval medicine of Western Europe
- Nursing
- Timeline of nursing history
- Timeline of medicine and medical technology
