= Minipe =

Coordinates: 7°13′N 80°59′E

- Village
- Interactive map of Minipe
- Country: Sri Lanka
- Province: Central Province
- Time zone: UTC+5:30 (Sri Lanka Standard Time)

Minipe is a town in rural Sri Lanka. It is located in Kandy District within Central Province. Historically the settlement was a gem city known as Minipura. The Minipe Divisional Secretariat is situated on the eastern slope.

== See also ==
- List of towns in Central Province, Sri Lanka
