= Udaya I =

- King of Anuradhapura
- Reign: 901–912
- Predecessor: Sena II
- Successor: Kassapa IV
- Dynasty: House of Lambakanna II
- Father: Adipada Kassapa

Udaya I was King of Anuradhapura in the 10th century, whose reign lasted from 901 to 912. He succeeded his brother Sena II as King of Anuradhapura and was succeeded by his brother Kassapa IV.

== See also ==
- List of Sri Lankan monarchs
- History of Sri Lanka

Udaya I House of Lambakanna II Born: ? ? Died: ? ?
Regnal titles
Preceded by Sena II	King of Anuradhapura; 901–912	Succeeded by Kassapa IV
