= Trough =

Trough may refer to:

== In science ==
- Trough (geology), a long depression less steep than a trench
- Trough (meteorology), an elongated region of low atmospheric pressure
- Trough (physics), the lowest point on a wave
- Trough level (medicine), the lowest concentration of a medicine is present in the body over time
- Langmuir-Blodgett trough, a laboratory instrument

== In politics ==
- Trough (economics), the lowest turning point of a business cycle
- as metaphor for political corruption, in the contexts of crony capitalism, nepotism, and public economics

== Other uses ==
- Bread trough or dough trough, rectangular receptacle with a shallow basin, used in breadmaking
- Trough (barony), a historical barony in County Monaghan, Ireland
- Trough (food) or manger, a container for animal feed
- Watering trough, a receptacle of drinking water for domestic and non-domestic livestock
- Water trough, a trough used to supply water to steam locomotives.
- Battle of the Trough, a 1756 skirmish of the French and Indian War in West Virginia
- Sleightholme Beck Gorge - The Troughs, a Site of Special Scientific Interest in the Teesdale district of south-west County Durham, England
- The Trough, a gorge carved by the South Branch Potomac River in West Virginia
- "Down the trough", as used by Donegal Gaelic football club Cill Chartha
- Trough, an old word for an inkwell

== See also ==
- Trow, a type of cargo boat
- Troff, a document processing system developed by AT&T for the Unix operating system
- "Tropho-", a Greek root meaning to feed or grow
- Trough urinal, a long urinal for many men
