= Minneriya Tank =

bisokotuwa
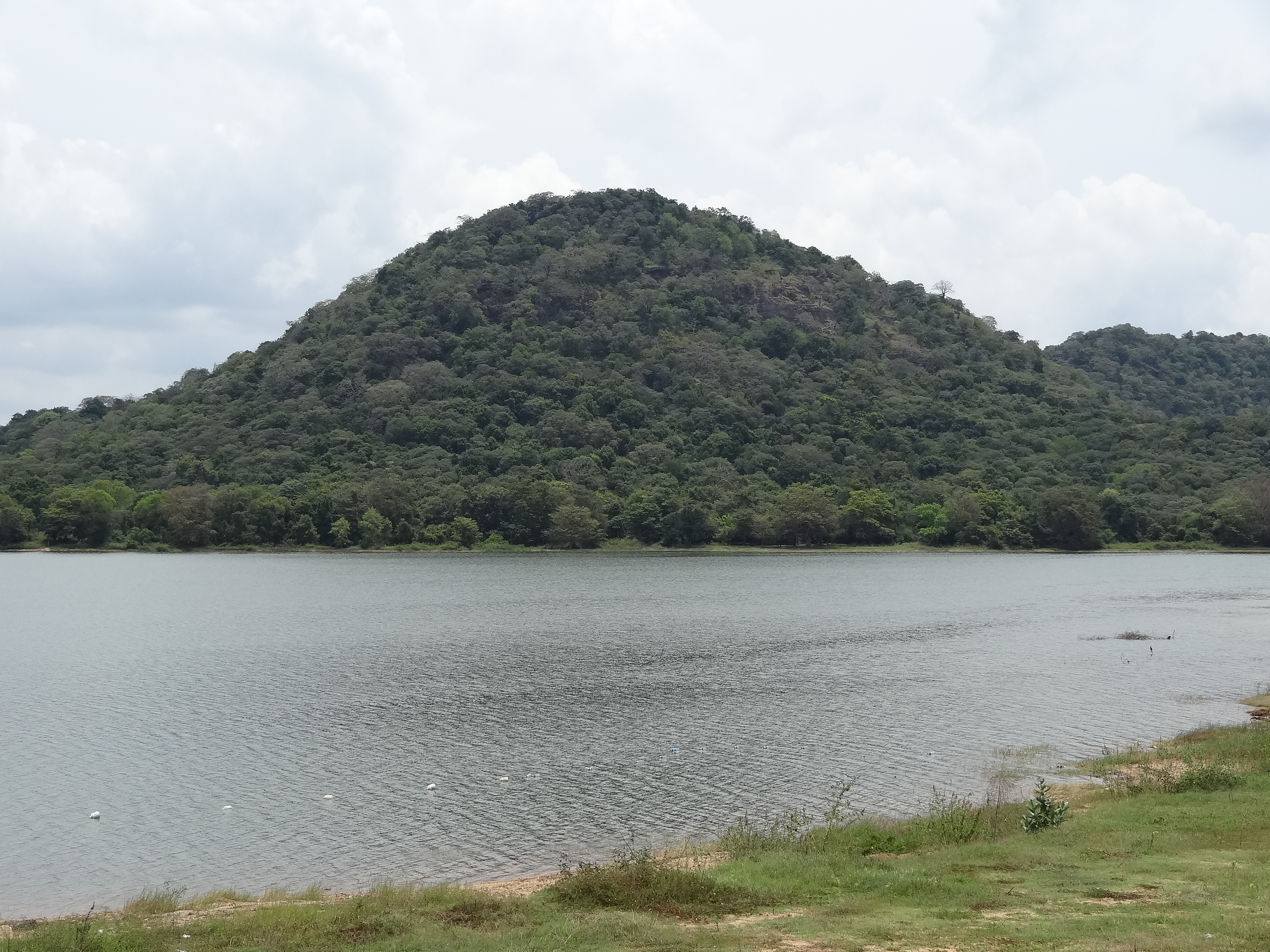
- Minneriya tank

- Location within Sri Lanka
- Location: Polonnaruwa
- Coordinates: 8°02′N 80°53′E
- Type: Reservoir
- River sources: Amban River
- Basin countries: Sri Lanka
- Surface area: 4,670 acres (18.9 km^{2})
- Water volume: 20,000,000,000 imperial gallons (9.1×10^{10} L; 2.4×10^{10} US gal)
- Shore length^{1}: 2 kilometres (1.2 mi)
- Islands: One
- Settlements: Polonnaruwa
- ^{1} Shore length is not a well-defined measure.

Minneriya tank is a reservoir in Sri Lanka made by an old civilisation; the Anuradhapura Kingdom. King Mahasena ordered a dam build across the Minneriya River, which made the lake. The tank covered 4,670 acres (18.9 km^{2}).

The Minneriya Tank was built by the great tank builder, King Mahasen (276–303) who ruled in Anuradhapura. This tank occupied 4670 acres and its strong 13-meter-tall dam running along a distance of 2 km held over 20 billion gallons of water. The water arrived from Amban River, the main tributary of Mahaveli River, 48 km away, along the Elahara canal built by King Vasabha (65–109) before his time.

This, along with other reservoirs created an irrigation paradise in the east. It was this growth in agriculture that opened up the massive trade with South East Asia through the Trincomalee harbor. From then onwards, Trincomalee harbor became one of the busiest in the region.

In 1820 AD, British Inland Revenue Officer Ralf Bachaus recorded that the whole area can be irrigated if this reservoir is restored. In 1856, British Governor Henry Ward recorded that it must have been an amazing reservoir which had been built very strong. They recorded the beauty of the vegetation, the wildlife which surrounded the reservoir.

The Mahavamsa, chronicle of Sri Lanka, states that Mahasen constructed sixteen large tanks and two irrigation canals. The largest among these is the Minneriya tank.
