= Durward Lely =

Scottish opera singer and actor (1852–1944)

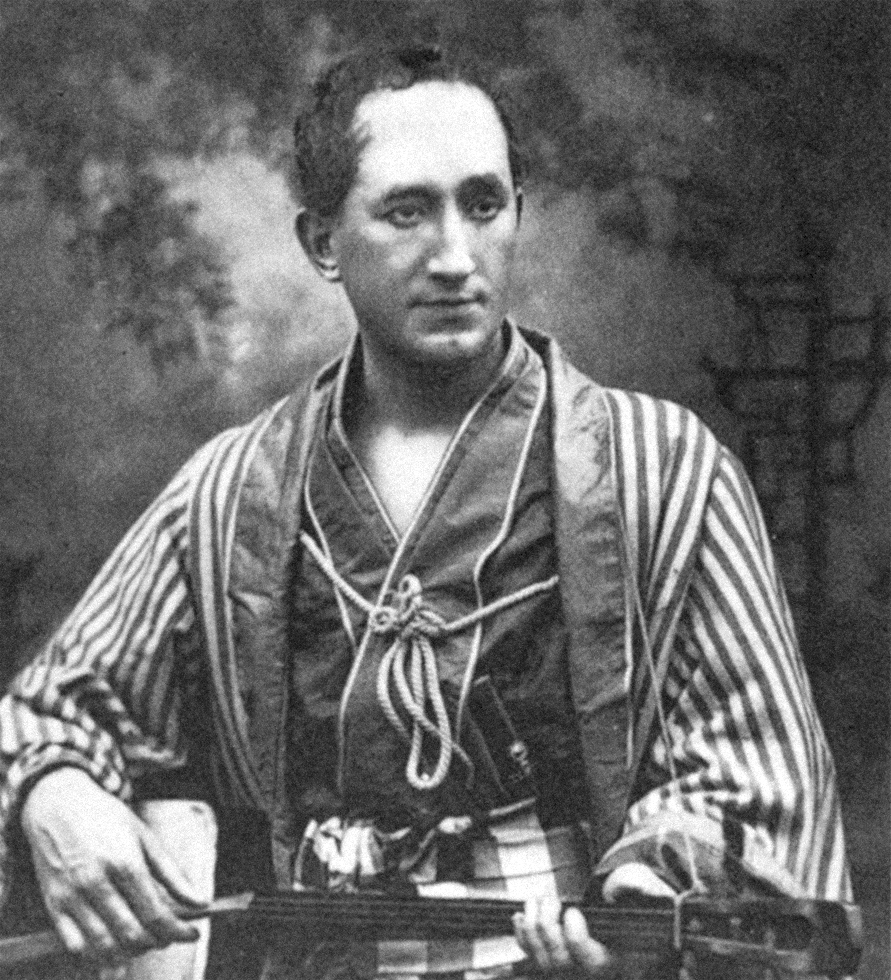
as Nanki Poo in The Mikado

Durward Lely (2 September 1852 – 29 February 1944) was a Scottish opera singer and actor. Although he had an extensive opera, concert and acting career, he is primarily remembered as the creator of five tenor roles in Gilbert and Sullivan's comic operas, including Nanki-Poo in The Mikado, for the D'Oyly Carte Opera Company.

Lely studied singing in Italy in the early 1870s and began his career there. He returned to tour in concerts and made his British opera debut in 1879, at Her Majesty's Theatre, in what would become one of his signature roles, Don José, in Carmen. After touring in opera, he joined the D'Oyly Carte Opera Company in 1880, soon becoming their leading tenor. He began there in the role of Frederic in The Pirates of Penzance and went on to create five roles in the famous series of Savoy operas, including Nanki-Poo in The Mikado. He remained with the company until 1887.

After this, Lely resumed a grand opera and concert career, appearing often with Adelina Patti, performing frequently at the Theatre Royal, Drury Lane, and touring with the Carl Rosa Opera Company, among others. He appeared widely in a musical stage adaptation, and in 1911, a film adaptation, of Rob Roy. Lely continued to perform until 1925. He outlived nearly all of the singers with whom he had performed at the Savoy Theatre.

== Life and career ==
=== Early life and career ===
James Lyall was born in Glover Street, Arbroath, in the County of Angus, Scotland, the second son of Elizabeth, née Dorward (1820–1896), and William Lyall (c. 1822–1898). His father was a stonemason and estate manager who became factor of Blackcraig Castle near Blairgowrie. Lely studied singing as a boy. The family moved to Blairgowrie, Perthshire, where, at the age of 14, Lely began working for a firm of solicitors. At the same time, he sang in church and with a local choral society and studied singing with Henry Nagel in Dundee. His father's employer, Patrick Allan-Fraser, impressed by Lely's voice, sent him for training in Milan. He studied with Francesco Lamperti and others for five years, after which he adopted the middle name Durward and sang for three years in Italy under the stage name Durvardo Leli. In December 1874, he sang in concert in Rome, at the Teatro Argentina. He spent a season in Sardinia in 1876–77, where he sang tenor roles in such operas as La sonnambula, Il barbiere di Siviglia, L'elisir d'amore, La favorite, Don Pasquale, Maria di Rohan, Faust and Il trovatore.

In 1878, back in England, Lely toured with J. H. Mapleson in concerts. He made his British operatic debut the following year, under the name Signor Leli, as Don José in Bizet's Carmen opposite Selina Dolaro, with the Carl Rosa Opera Company at Her Majesty's Theatre, London. A review in The Athenaeum commented that he "can act as well as sing; his voice is of the tenorino class, light but agreeable". While touring subsequently in Carmen with Emily Soldene's company, Lely became engaged to a Swansea native, Alice Frances Hurndall (1860–1936), whom he married early in 1881 in Liverpool. During two years on tour, including with Soldene and the Mapleson Opera Company, he played additional leading tenor roles, including Don Florio in Richard Genée's The Naval Cadet and the Defendant in Gilbert and Sullivan's Trial by Jury.

In November 1880 Lely joined the D'Oyly Carte Opera Company at the Opera Comique, London. He replaced George Power in the leading tenor role of Frederic in the original London production of The Pirates of Penzance. At Arthur Sullivan's suggestion, he adopted the stage name Durward Lely. Of his Frederic, The Times commented, "His acting and enunciation of the words, with and without music, leave much to be desired". The Era was more impressed: "The advantage of having an experienced and competent operatic tenor to represent Frederic … is great, and Mr Durward Lely, having gained no little reputation in Italian opera, plays and sings in English with equal success. He acted with much spirit, and the graceful music allotted to the tenor was rendered very effectively".

=== Principal tenor ===
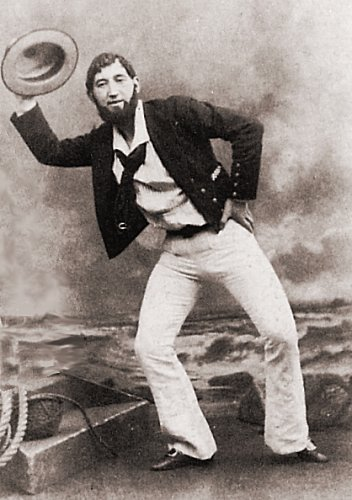
Lely as Dauntless

Lely became D'Oyly Carte's principal tenor, creating the leading tenor parts in five Gilbert and Sullivan operas. The first three of these were the Duke of Dunstable in Patience (1881; moving to the Savoy Theatre when the company transferred there), Earl Tolloller in Iolanthe (1882), and Cyril in Princess Ida (1884). He played Alexis in The Sorcerer and the Defendant in Trial by Jury when those operas were revived in 1884. In 1885, he created the role of Nanki-Poo in The Mikado, playing the character until 1887. His role in that opera is dramatised in the 1999 Mike Leigh film Topsy-Turvy, where he is portrayed by Kevin McKidd. Of his Nanki-Poo, a review in The Era stated, "His voice is peculiar, but its peculiarity is far from unpleasant, and its timbre is of a quality that 'carries' far without much exertion on his part".

In 1887, Lely created the role of Richard Dauntless in the next Savoy opera, Ruddigore. In a 1926 article for The Gilbert & Sullivan Journal, Lely recalled how Dauntless's famous hornpipe dance became a part of the piece:

At the first music rehearsal, or rather the first time the music was played over to us by Sullivan at the piano we arrived at Dick Dauntless's "Parlez vous" song. After playing it over Sullivan said "That's your song, Lely." Gilbert happened to be seated next to me, and I said quite innocently "It sounds as though a hornpipe should follow." Gilbert grunted. Nothing more was said or thought – at least by me – about the matter. A few days later at rehearsal Gilbert, without any preamble, said "Lely, can you dance a hornpipe?" I was rather taken aback, as I had quite forgotten having spoken about one. So, trying to be funny I suppose, I said "Well, Mr. Gilbert, as the man said when asked if he could play the fiddle, I've never tried so I don't know." Gilbert answered quite seriously "How soon can you know?" – and I said equally seriously – "To-morrow".

After a few efforts, the ballet master confirmed: "Tell Mr. Gilbert you can". According to Lely, upon being so informed, "Gilbert said 'Right, I'll get Sullivan to write you one.'" The Times noted Lely's improved stage persona: "Mr Durward Lely was at first a very awkward actor, and yet, under Mr Gilbert's training, developed into the dashing tar in Ruddigore". Late in 1887, when the run of Ruddigore ended, Lely left the D'Oyly Carte Opera Company.

=== Grand opera, concert work and later years ===
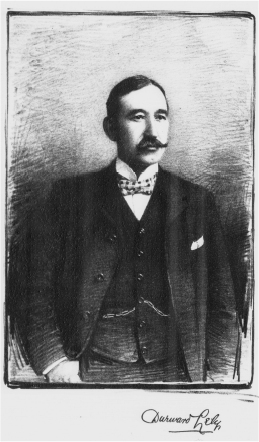
Lely in 1895

He then pursued a concert and operatic career. He appeared with Adelina Patti on numerous occasions, and she said he was her favourite tenor. He often sang at her home, Craig-y-Nos Castle, and he accompanied her on her farewell American tour in 1893–1894. He frequently sang Don José in Carmen, including appearing opposite Zélie de Lussan at Covent Garden in 1893, and also opposite Minnie Hauk. Later, he sang the role at the Manhattan Opera House in New York. The Observer wrote of one of his performances in the role, "His acting was pathetic, impressive and natural; his elocution was polished, and he sang delightfully from beginning to end." He had numerous operatic and concert engagements in London and elsewhere between 1890 and 1893. His operatic appearances included several at the Theatre Royal, Drury Lane, beginning with the Carl Rosa Opera Company in Lurline as Count Rudolph. He also had roles in Mignon, The Bohemian Girl and Maritana.

In an 1891 interview, Lely stated that he most enjoyed concert work. His performances on the concert stage included Messiah, The Creation, St Paul, Damnation of Faust, Antonín Dvořák's The Spectre’s Bride, The Golden Legend, and Frederic Cowen's St John’s Eve. He also acted widely in Scottish plays with songs, including as Francis Osbaldistone in a stage adaptation of Rob Roy and Henry Bertram in the stage version of Guy Mannering. Of his portrayal in an 1894 production of Rob Roy, a reviewer in The Dundee Courier wrote: "Certainly it is not possible to imagine … a finer Francis Osbaldistone than Mr. Lely. … He sang [his songs] as only he can sing them, and he infused an amount of expression and feeling into "Auld Langsyne" which we never heard equalled. The effect he produced in the chorus of this song was a veritable tour de force, and brought down the house, eliciting an undeniable encore. In 1893, he sang in Arthur Thomas's opera The Golden Web at the Lyric Theatre. He also spent some time performing with his own opera company.

Lely sometimes sang with his wife in amateur performances, for example as Lionel opposite her Nancy in Martha in Dundee in 1888. In 1892, he toured with his wife accompanying him at the piano in an entertainment called "Scottish Song and Story". They again toured with this entertainment in the US and Canada in 1895 and again in 1898, going on to Australia and New Zealand. In 1905, at the St. James's Theatre and then on tour, he starred in a stage adaptation of Beside the Bonnie Brier Bush with Henry Ainley and Lilian Braithwaite. Lely also appeared as Francis Osbaldistone in the 1911 film of Rob Roy. He became a close friend of fellow D'Oyly Carte principal Henry Lytton, even though Lytton's long tenure with the company took place mostly after Lely had left it. Lely continued to act and sing in Scottish plays with his own company until 1925.

Lely and his wife had three sons and a daughter, Adelina, named for Patti. He retired to his estate, Glenardle, in Bridge of Cally, where he enjoyed fishing and shooting. After his wife died, he lived with their son, Durward junior, the manager of the King's Theatre in Glasgow. Lely outlived nearly all of the singers with whom he had performed at the Savoy Theatre, and newspapers referred to him as the last surviving Savoyard, but younger performers in the later Gilbert and Sullivan operas lived much longer (for example Decima Moore and Nancy McIntosh).

Lely died in Hillhead, Glasgow, on 29 February 1944, at the age of 91, of heart failure. The date of his death is ironic for a Gilbert and Sullivan tenor, in that 29 February, leap day, is the birthday of the tenor character, Frederic, in The Pirates of Penzance, which becomes a key plot point. In Act II of the opera, Frederic promises to claim his bride on his 21st birthday, which will not take place until 1940. Lely thus died one "birthday" after that.

== Autobiography ==
In 2007, Simon Moss revealed a newly discovered pamphlet called Mr Durward Lely, The Eminent Tenor. The 20-page booklet describes Lely's career. It was first published in three instalments in March and April 1894 in The Blairgowrie Advertiser and then issued in booklet form. Although the pamphlet does not credit an author, it is patent that it is self-written. Lely praises Gilbert as a director.
