= Hospital of St John the Baptist, Arbroath =

Hospital of St John the Baptist
- Arbroath Abbey
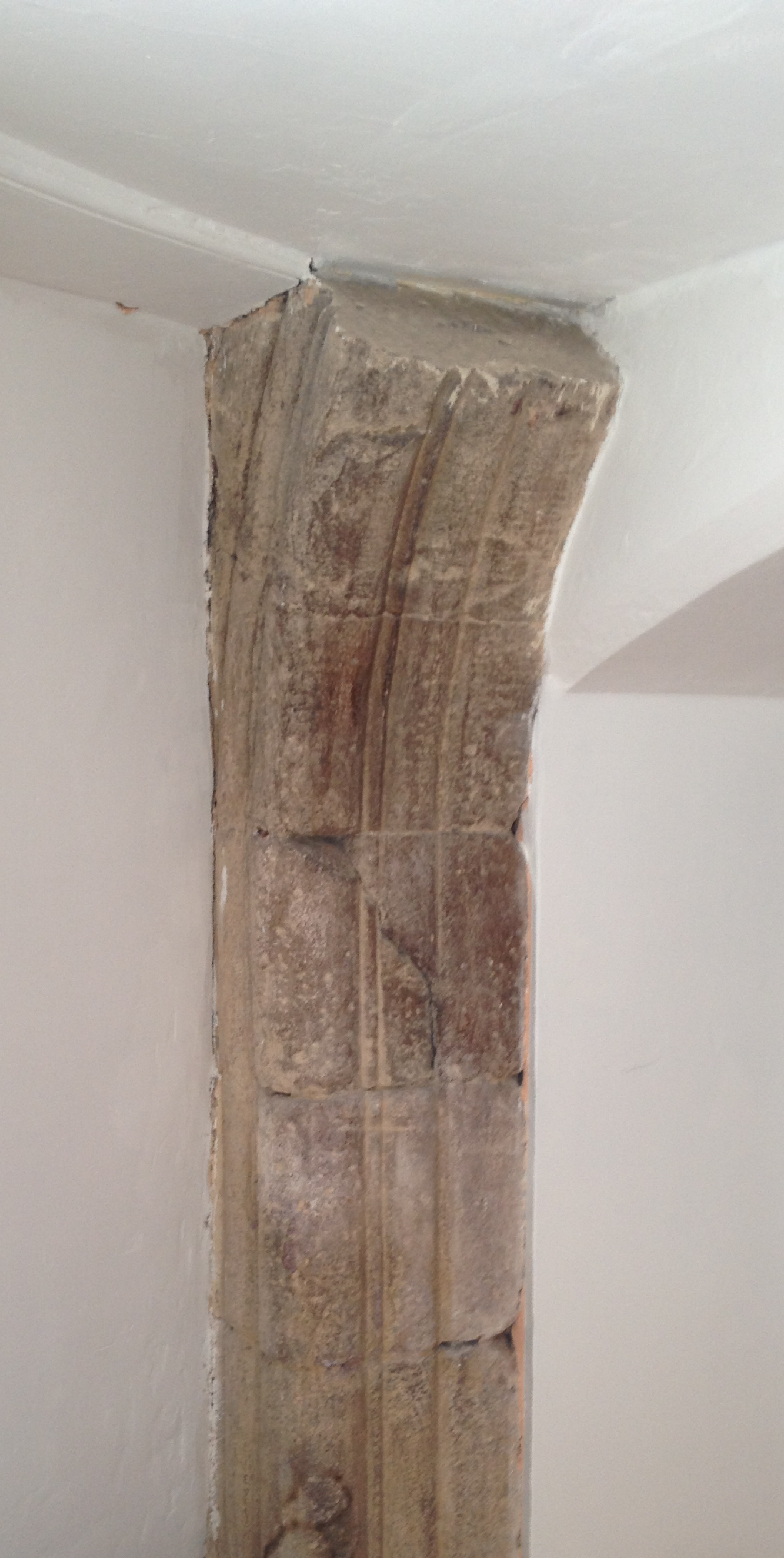
- Fragment of what may be the medieval doorway located within Hospitalfield House

- Location in Arbroath within Angus

Geography
- Location: Arbroath, Angus, Scotland
- Coordinates: 56.5545°N 2.6107°W

Organisation
- Care system: Medieval Sub-Monastic care
- Type: Medieval Abbey Hospital
- Patron: Archbishop David Beaton during 1539-1546

History
- Founded: c. 1325
- Closed: c. 1560
- Demolished: After 1560

Links
- Lists: Hospitals in Scotland
- Other links: Hospitals in medieval Scotland

The Hospital of St John the Baptist, at Arbroath, Scotland, was founded in the early 14th century by the monastic community at Arbroath Abbey. The exact date for the foundation is uncertain, but it is first recorded in 1325 during the time that Bernard of Kilwinning (1324–c.1328) was Abbot of Arbroath. (Note: The 1325 date appears in a document Inquisicio facta de domo elimosinaria, from Reg. Nig. Fol. 59/ Regal.fol. 99. (see Innes, Cosmo; Chalmers, Patrick, eds. (1848). Liber S. Thome De Aberbrothoc. Registrorum Abbacie De Aberbrothoc. Pars Altera. Registrum Nigrum Necnon Libros Cartarum Recentiores Complectens. 1329-1536. Vol. ii. Edinburgh: Bannatyne Club. p. 141.). A further reference is found in a later document, Assedatio terrarum de Spedalfeilde facta Reginaldo de Dunbradan et Hugoni Macpessi, from Regist. Nig. F. 14/ Regist. Regali f 16. (see Innes, Cosmo; Chalmers, Patrick, eds. (1848). Liber S. Thome De Aberbrothoc. Registrorum Abbacie De Aberbrothoc. Pars Prior. Registrum Vetus Munimentaque Eidem Coetanea Complectens. 1178-1329. Vol. i. Edinburgh: Bannatyne Club. p. 309.).) The Abbey itself was founded in 1178 by King William the Lion for a group of Tironensian Benedictine monks from Kelso Abbey. It was consecrated in 1197. It is possible that the hospital was used by travellers, as a chantry or possibly almshouse.

The only visible remains of the medieval hospital are a left hand door arch which has been incorporated into the 19th-century Hospitalfield House. In the nineteenth century a chance location of about 120 skeletons in shallow graves near Hospitalfield House suggests the site of a medieval burial ground. Hospitalfield House is now an arts centre, and inspired the fictional location "Monkbarns", the home of Jonathan Oldbuck, title character of Sir Walter Scott’s novel, The Antiquary.

== History ==
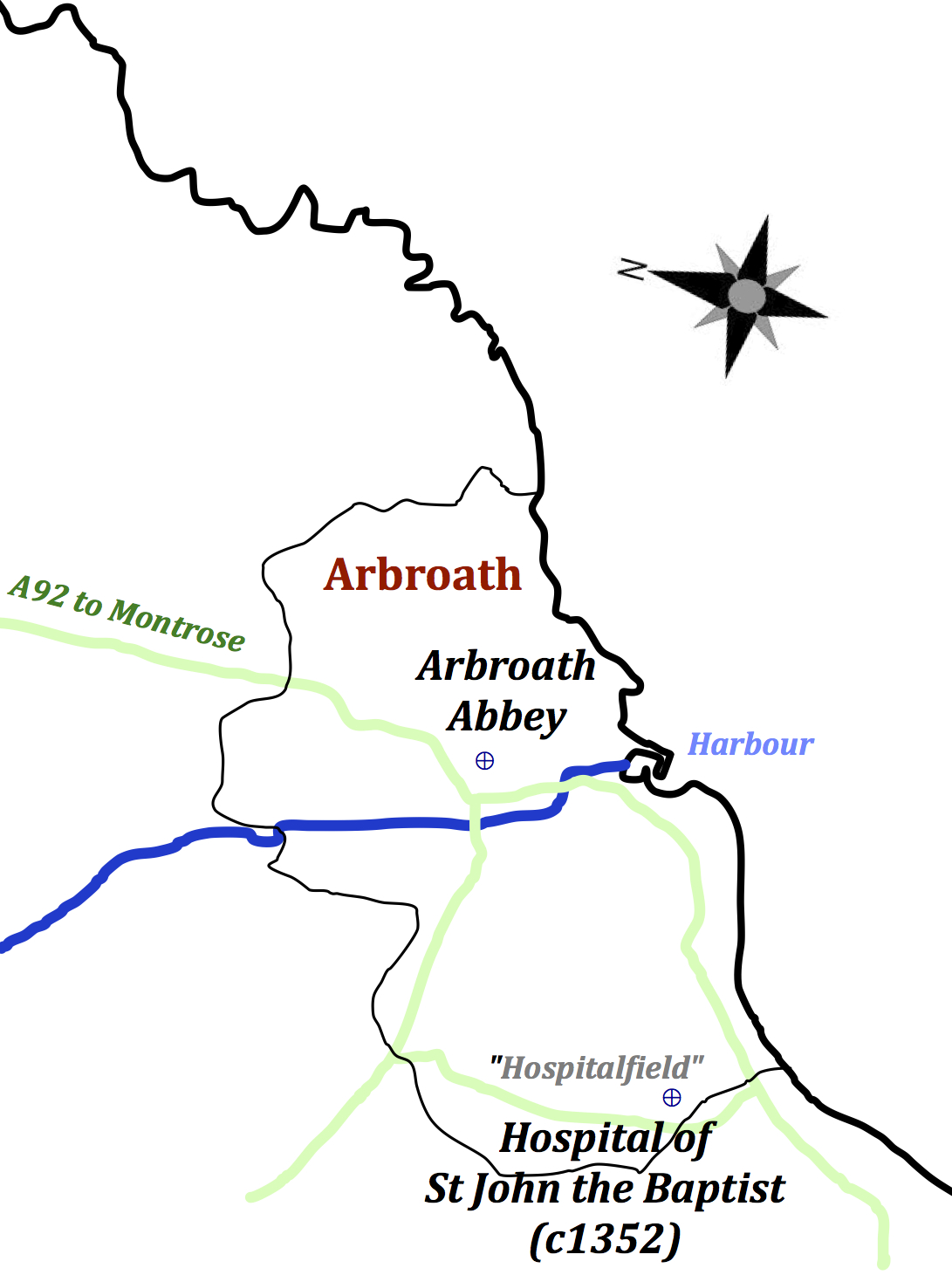
Location of the Hospital of St John the Baptist c1352 and Arbroath Abbey.

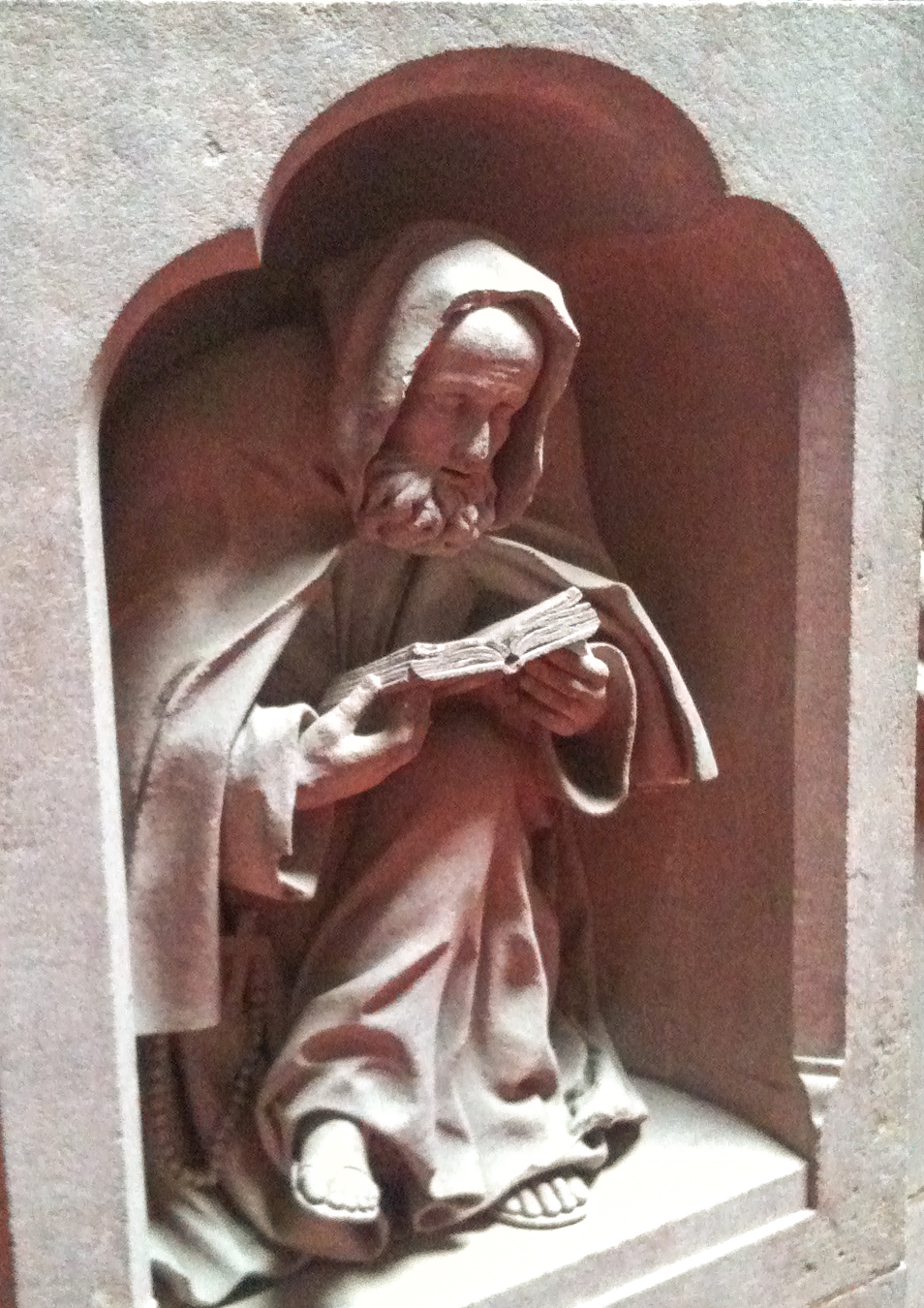
Nineteenth century stone carving from Hospitalfield House signifying the monastic connection of the house to the medieval hospital.

The history of the Hospital of St John the Baptist, "iuxta Aberbrothoc" [near Arbroath], is not certain. Miller (1860) in his History of the Abbey at Arbroath provides a workable framework. He writes:

This chapel [of St John the Baptist] stood near the mansion-house of Hospitalfield, a mile to the westward of Arbroath, and was erected in connection with the hospital or infirmary of the Abbey, established at this healthy spot at such a distance from the parent monastery as to relieve it from the risk of danger from contagious diseases.

He dates the hospital as being:

...in existence previous to the year 1325, when Abbot Bernard leased the lands of "Spedalfeilde, belonging to the hospital of Saint John Baptist, near Aberbrothoc," to Reginald de Dunbradan and Hugo Macpeesis, for five years, at a rent of forty shillings, payable to the Almory of the monastery; and took them bound to build two sufficient husbandry houses—namely, a barn forty feet long, and a byre of the same length, within one year from their entry, and to leave the same in good order on the lands at the end of their lease—a noticeable instance of progress in the management of lands, and the wisdom of the Abbot's administration.

Miller states that the hospital was connected with the "Eleemosynary of Arbroath": that is, a charitable foundation. He continues with the history:

In an inquest, made on 22nd November 1464, regarding the nature of the foundations of the Almory and Infirmary, the jury stated that "Spitalfelde" and this chapel were not distinct from the property of the monastery, and that the Monks of the Almory received annually two merks from these lands. The chapel was consecrated, and the altar of it dedicated, on 23rd August 1485, by the Bishop of Dromore.

The Bishop of the time was Georgios Vranas, a Greek by birth, who was Bishop of Dromore from 1483 to 1499. Miller gives one further notice, which he states is the last mention of the chapel in the Abbey register:

On 4th December 1490, the Abbot let the teinds of the church of Abernethy to John Ramsay of Kilgour, for a yearly rent, and a sum advanced for the repair of the chapel of the infirmary, which is described as in danger of falling into ruin.

An obligation for the payment of annates due from this hospital was made 30 June 1519. Also, a charter of 1543 that details the lands and holdings of this hospital is in the possession of the Trustees of Hospitalfield House. In the 1570s, Alexander Beaton, a son of Cardinal David Beaton and Marion Ogilvy lived at Hospitalfield.

=== Nineteenth-century archaeology ===
David Miller, in his History of the Abbey at Arbroath written in 1860, describes Hospitalfield House as follows:

The older or central part of the present mansion-house of Hospitalfield is evidently a part of the ancient Abbey hospital. This is proved by the remains of several old doors and other indications about the walls of the house; and especially by one side of an ancient door which was lately discovered during some alterations in the front wall, a few yards west from the modern door, and which the proprietor, with good taste, has caused to be repaired and left open for inspection. This door appears, from the depth and character of its mouldings to have been one of the principal entrances to the hospital, and to have been erected after the early English style of architecture had ceased to be followed. The spring of the upper stones shews that its head was either a pointed or semicircular arch, having the side mouldings carried round without alteration, and without capitals at the spring of the arch. If our view be correct, these marks denote the erection of the hospital to have been from fifty to a hundred years subsequent to the foundation of the Abbey.

Late in 1860 a chance discovery by Patrick Allan-Fraser, owner of Hospitalfield, led to an archaeological dig that located some 120 skeletons which were probably from a burial place adjacent to the original hospital. Antiquarian Andrew Jervise undertook an excavation in the spring of 1861. The account of the excavation and the significance of the find is recalled in detail in an article Jervise wrote for the Proceedings of the Society of Antiquaries of Scotland. He recalls the date when Allan-Fraser first discovered the skeletons and their significance as follows:

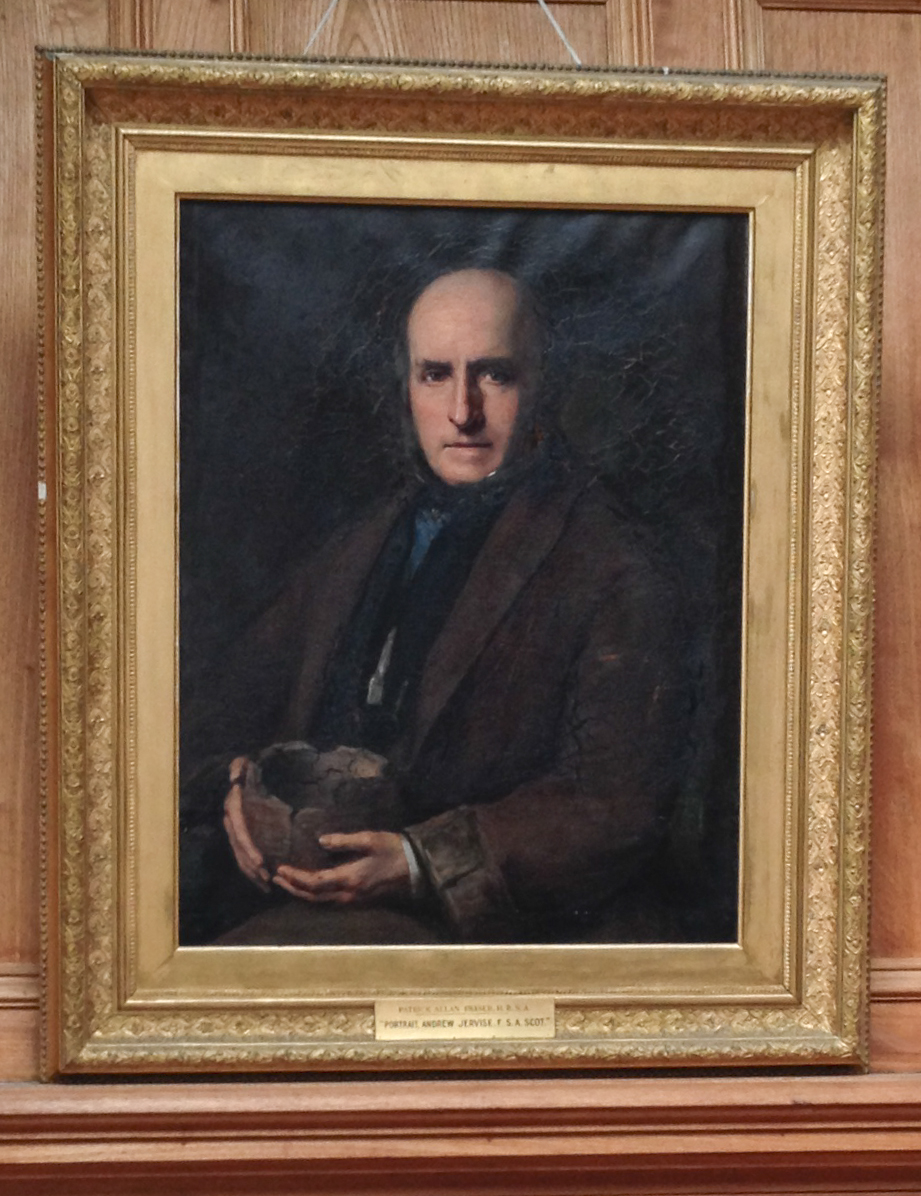
Andrew Jervise as painted by Patrick Allan-Fraser

During the autumn of 1860, while a field was being broken up by the plough upon the estate of Hospitalfield, bits of human bones were brought to the surface. Fortunately, the proprietor, Patrick Allan-Fraser, Esq., F.S.A. Scot., was walking along with the ploughman at the time; and on making further search, Mr Fraser discovered portions of more than one skeleton, upon which, with the laudable view of having the place more fully searched, agricultural operations were suspended. The weather proving very unfavourable, it was not until the 26th of February following that the investigations were proceeded with. These were conducted under the joint superintendence of Mr. Fraser and myself, when excavations were made at the place where the bones were first discovered, and over an area of about 60 feet in length by about 40 feet in width, which was considerably more than the apparent extent of the cemetery. Within the space of about 10 or 12 feet square, which was laid open around the spot where the remains were first observed, no fewer than five or six skeletons were found; and on making trenches about 5 feet apart, skeletons were got lying in pretty regular rows. They were all remarkably entire, the teeth being in most cases quite fresh, and exhibiting but few signs of disease ever having existed. The bodies appeared to have been laid at full length. The heads were towards the south-west, with the exception of those of some children and that of a mere infant, which lay from north to south.

Jervise concluded that the site had been the cemetery for the Hospital of St John the Baptist, which he was certain had stood nearby. During the same excavations, some foundations were discovered. Jervise offered caution about their significance, stating that their identification with the hospital chapel was uncertain, but that the chapel had been recorded in this area.

When the courtyard of the house was re-laid in the 1980s, building foundations were discovered which may be further fragments of hospital buildings. Human remains have been discovered at two locations at the Red Lion caravan park to the south of the house, in 1952 and also in 1996.

==== Visible Remains of the Hospital ====
The only remains of the original buildings is a portion of a doorway which is built into a room in the house. This fragment of doorway is still visible inside the house beside the junction of one of the bay windows (see infobox picture above).

== Hospitalfield House ==
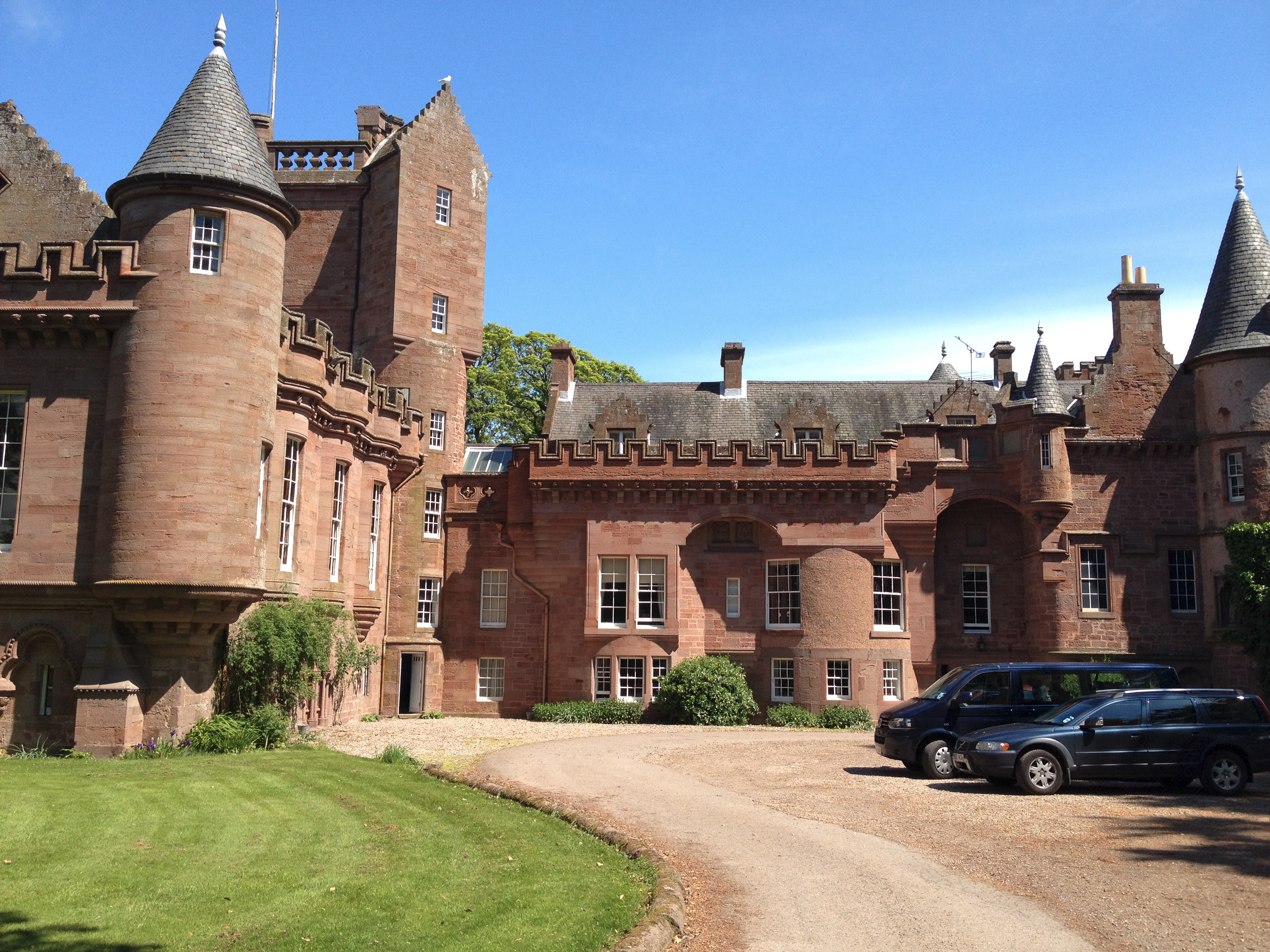
Hospitalfield House, Arbroath, Scotland. The site of St John the Baptist Hospital.

The remains of the hospital are in and around Hospitalfield House. After the Scottish Reformation the land was purchased by a James Fraser around 1665. The present house was built in the 19th century, and was the home of Patrick Allan Fraser (1813–1890), a noted Scottish painter and antiquarian. After his death the house passed to a trust dedicated to providing training in the arts, and it continues to be run as a charitable arts centre. The house is a category A listed building.

=== Walter Scott and The Antiquary ===
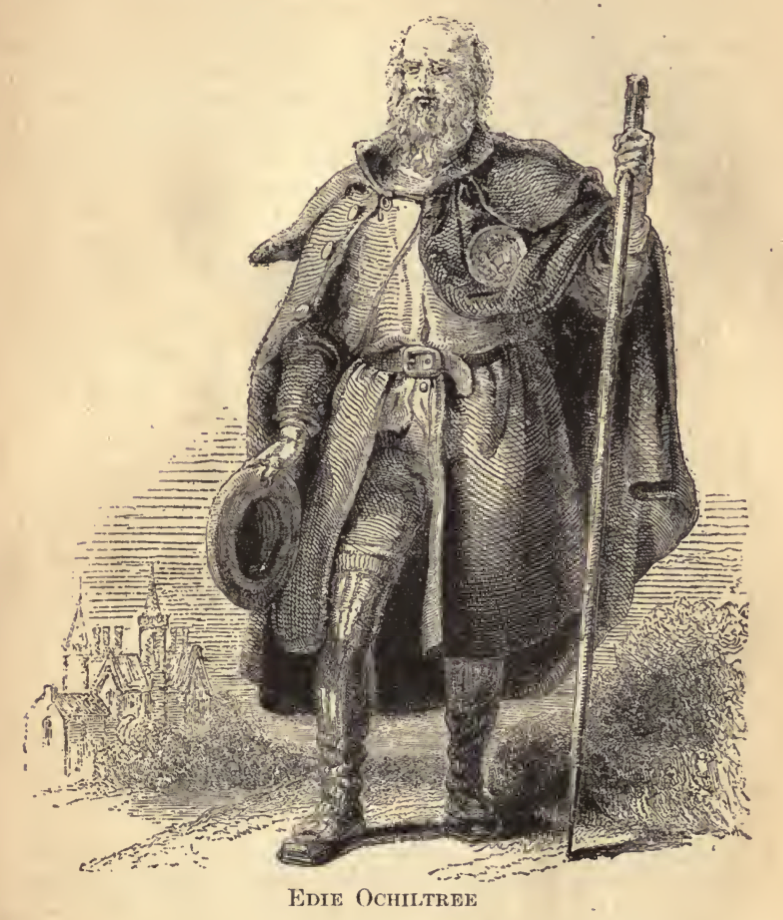
Edie Ochiltree from the 1914 Edition of The Antiquary - Edited by F. A. Cavenagh

Sir Walter Scott published his third novel in 1816, entitled The Antiquary. The story is partly set around Arbroath, or "Fairport" as it is called in the novel. Scott had visited Hospitalfield House in 1803 and 1809, and used it as the basis of the fictional house of Monkbarns.

== See also ==
- Hospitals in medieval Scotland
- Aberdeen trades hospitals
- Mitchell's Hospital Old Aberdeen
- Kincardine O'Neil Hospital, Aberdeenshire
- Scottish Bedesmen
- Hospitalfield House
- Hospital of St John the Baptist, High Wycombe
- Hospital of St John the Baptist, Winchester
