= Hospital of St John the Baptist =

Hospital of St John the Baptist may mean:

- Hospital of St John the Baptist, Arbroath, Scotland
- Hospital of St John the Baptist, High Wycombe, England
- Hospital of St John the Baptist, Winchester, England

== See also ==
- Hospitium of St John the Baptist, of Reading Abbey, England
- Brothers Hospitallers of Saint John of God, a Catholic order
- Knights Hospitaller, or Order of Knights of the Hospital of Saint John of Jerusalem, a medieval and early modern Catholic military order
- Order of Saint John (chartered 1888), or Most Venerable Order of the Hospital of Saint John of Jerusalem, a British royal order of chivalry
