= Graham Fagen =

Scottish artist

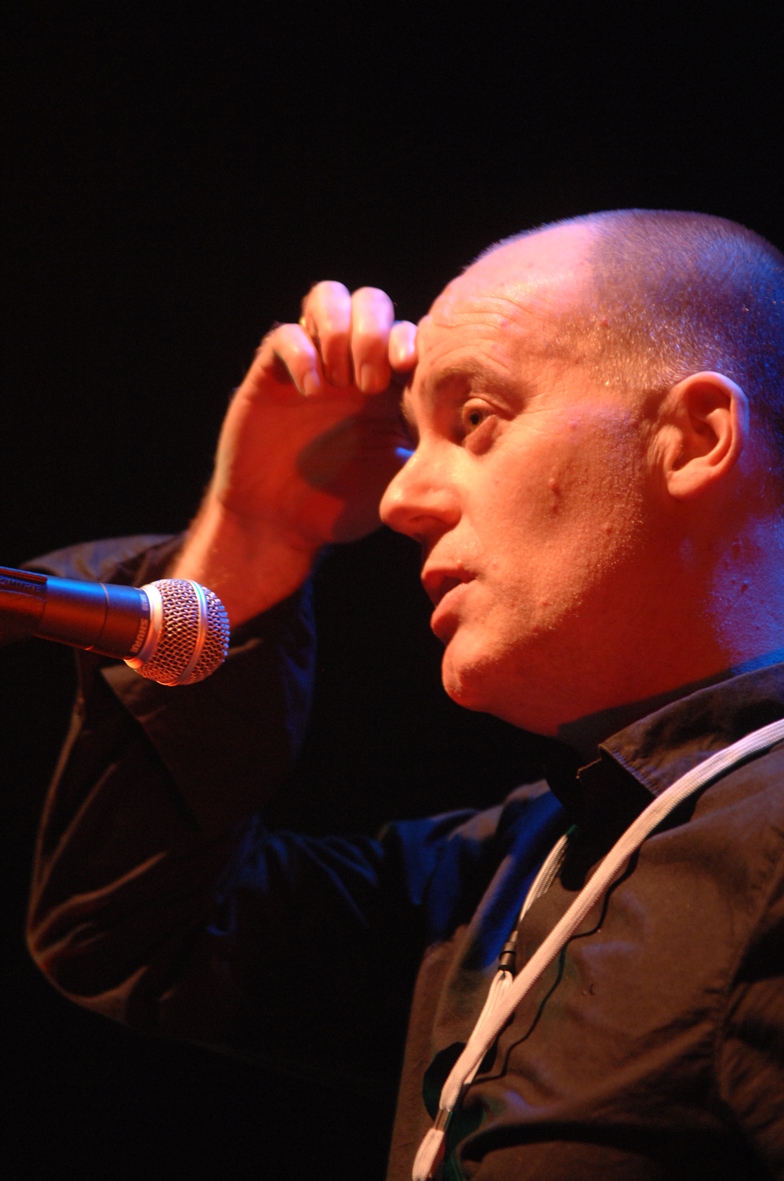
- Education: Glasgow School of Art, Kent Institute of Art and Design
- Known for: video, installation, sculpture, photography and text.
- Website: grahamfagen.com

Graham Fagen (born 1966) is a Scottish artist living and working in Glasgow, Scotland. He has exhibited internationally at the Busan Biennale, South Korea (2004), the Art and Industry Biennial, New Zealand (2004), the Venice Biennale (2003) and represented Scotland at the 56th Venice Biennale in 2015 in a presentation curated and organised by Hospitalfield. In Britain he has exhibited at the Victoria & Albert Museum, Tate Britain and the Institute of Contemporary Arts, London. In 1999 he was invited by the Imperial War Museum, London to work as the Official War Artist for Kosovo.

His art practice encompasses video, performance, sculpture, sound and text. His work reflects on how contemporary identity and its associated myths and fictions, can be expressed and understood. and his portraits of real, imagined, historical and contemporary characters explore the idea of identity and performance in portraiture. Plants and flowers are recurrent motifs in his art, as he explores their ability to suggest various meanings: social, emotional, personal and national.

Fagen is a professor at Duncan of Jordanstone College of Art and Design, Dundee, Scotland. He has previously taught at Glasgow School of Art, Perpignan School of Art, Perpignan, France, St. Martins School of Art, London, and Kent Institute of Art & Design, Canterbury.

== Introduction ==
Fagen's international exhibitions include the Venice Biennale (solo in 2015 and group presentation in 2003 both with Scotland + Venice), Busan Biennale, South Korea and the Art and Industry Biennial, New Zealand. In Britain he has exhibited in Scottish National Gallery of Modern Art, The Other Flower Show at the Victoria & Albert Museum, Tate Britain and the Institute of Contemporary Art, London and in 1999 was invited by the Imperial War Museum, London to work as the Official War Artist for Kosovo. Main project collaborators include Hospitalfield, Arbroath; La Friche Belle de Mai, Marseille, Glasgow School of Art, Glasgow, Scottish National Gallery of Modern Art, Edinburgh, Scottish National Portrait Gallery, Edinburgh; Tramway, Glasgow; National Theatre of Scotland, Glasgow; Gallery of Modern Art, Glasgow; The Changing Room Gallery, Stirling; Royal Botanic Garden Edinburgh; Glasgow International Festival of Visual Art; Dundee Contemporary Arts; and Artpace, San Antonio.

== Exhibitions and projects ==
In 2015 he represented Scotland at the 56th International Art Exhibition – La Biennale di Venezia with a solo exhibition for Scotland + Venice an official collateral event curated and organised by Hospitalfield. This exhibition included new bronze, ceramic, steel and neon sculptures, Indian ink drawings and a 5 channel audio-video work within a series of rooms and a courtyard of Palazzo Fontana, which had previously never been used for an exhibition and is located on the Grand Canal in the Cannaregio district of Venice.

During GENERATION - 25 Years of Contemporary Art in Scotland, a programme of exhibitions across Scotland in 2014, Graham Fagen exhibited within several venues. He presented a solo exhibition of new works at The Glasgow School of Art entitled Cabbages in an Orchard; The formers and forms of Charles Rennie Mackintosh and Graham Fagen.

In April 2012 Fagen presented a collaboration with theatre director Graham Eatough and photography director Michael McDonough entitled The Making Of Us, which combined elements of performance, art installation and film, part reality TV and part scripted metafiction. It was conceived with Tramway and National Theatre of Scotland.

Other recent solo exhibitions include Missing, Scottish National Portrait Gallery, commissioned by the National Galleries of Scotland, Edinburgh, Under Heavy Manners, Artpace, San Antonio, where he also formed a band with his fellow artist in residence Frank Benson and Artspace preparator Chad Dawkins

His publications include:

- Subversive On The Side Of A Lunatic, The Henry Moore Foundation, 1999.
- Botanica, designed by Chris Evans, Grisedale Arts, 2002
- Love Is Lovely, Fruitmarket Gallery, 2002
- Clean Hands Pure Heart, Tramway, 2005
- Cabbages in an Orchard, Glasgow School of Art, 2014
- Graham Fagen, Scotland + Venice and Hospitalfield, 2015
