= In Naples, Portrait of the Artist =

Painting by William Powell Frith

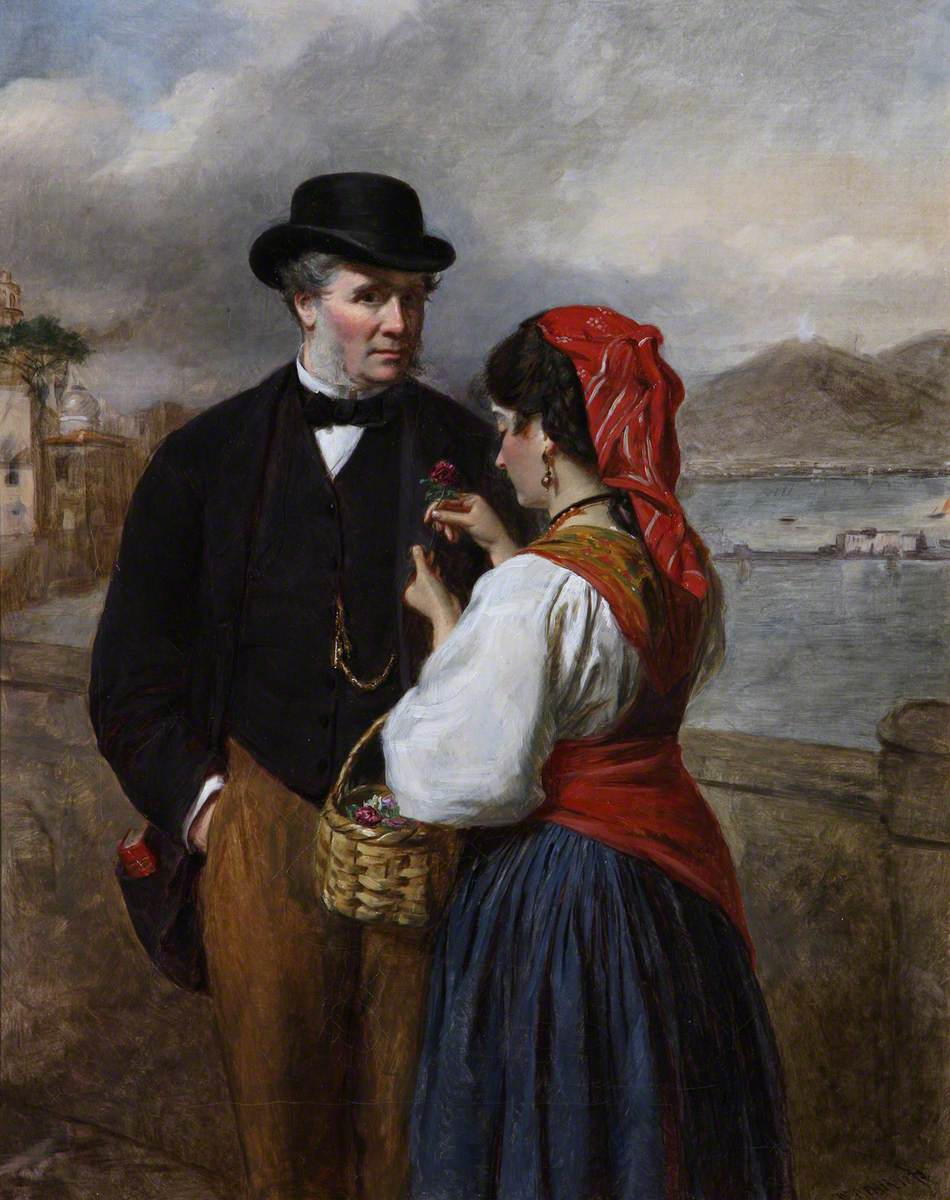
- Artist: William Powell Frith
- Year: 1875
- Type: Oil on canvas, portrait painting
- Dimensions: 61.8 cm × 49 cm (24.3 in × 19 in)
- Location: Hospitalfield House; Arbroath

In Naples, Portrait of the Artist is an oil on canvas painting by the British artist William Powell Frith, from 1875. A self-portrait, it shows him being approached and "buttonholed" by an Italian flower seller with the Bay of Naples behind him. Frith accompanied his wife and daughters on a Grand Tour of Continental Europe that year, although this was one of on a few paintings he produced from the trip.

The picture was displayed at Royal Scottish Academy in 1877. Today it is in the collection of Hospitalfield House in Arbroath, having been acquired in 1890.

== Bibliography ==
- Green, Richard & Sellars, Jane. William Powell Frith: The People's Painter. Bloomsbury, 2019.
- Wood, Christopher. William Powell Frith: A Painter and His World. Sutton Publishing, 2006.
