= Marsatac =

Festival of electronic music in France

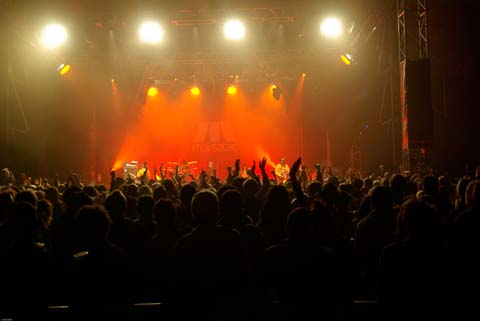
- Marsatac scene in 2008
- Genre: Electronic music, electro, rock, etc.
- Locations: Nîmes and Marseille, France
- Years active: 1999-present
- Attendance: 35,000 (2012)

Marsatac is a festival of electronic music held at the end of September each year, in Marseille, France. Since 2009, the festival has had trouble finding a lasting location, and the City of Marseilles has often been criticized for not defending this popular event. Since 2012, the festival has also been held in Nîmes, one week before the Marseille event. In 2013, the festival took from 19 to 29 November.

== History ==
It was originally dedicated to the Marseille hip hop scene, then expanded progressively to international hip-hop scene, to electro, rock and, since 2008, to African music for one night. The first edition took place in 1999. Since its creation, the festival took place in many different locations, on the Frioul archipelago, at Dock des Suds and on the J4, at . Since 2009 the J4 has been unavailable due to the building of the MUCEM, therefore the festival took place in Dock des Suds, and then at La Friche, where it is still held for the moment. In Nîmes, the festival occurs in the recent cultural building Paloma.

In the 2011 edition, more than 23,000 people attended the festival, which ran sold out. In 2012, more than 35,000 people participated in the festival.

== See also ==
- List of electronic music festivals
