= Andrew Jervise =

Andrew Jervise (1820–1878) was a Scottish compositor, drawing teacher and antiquarian.

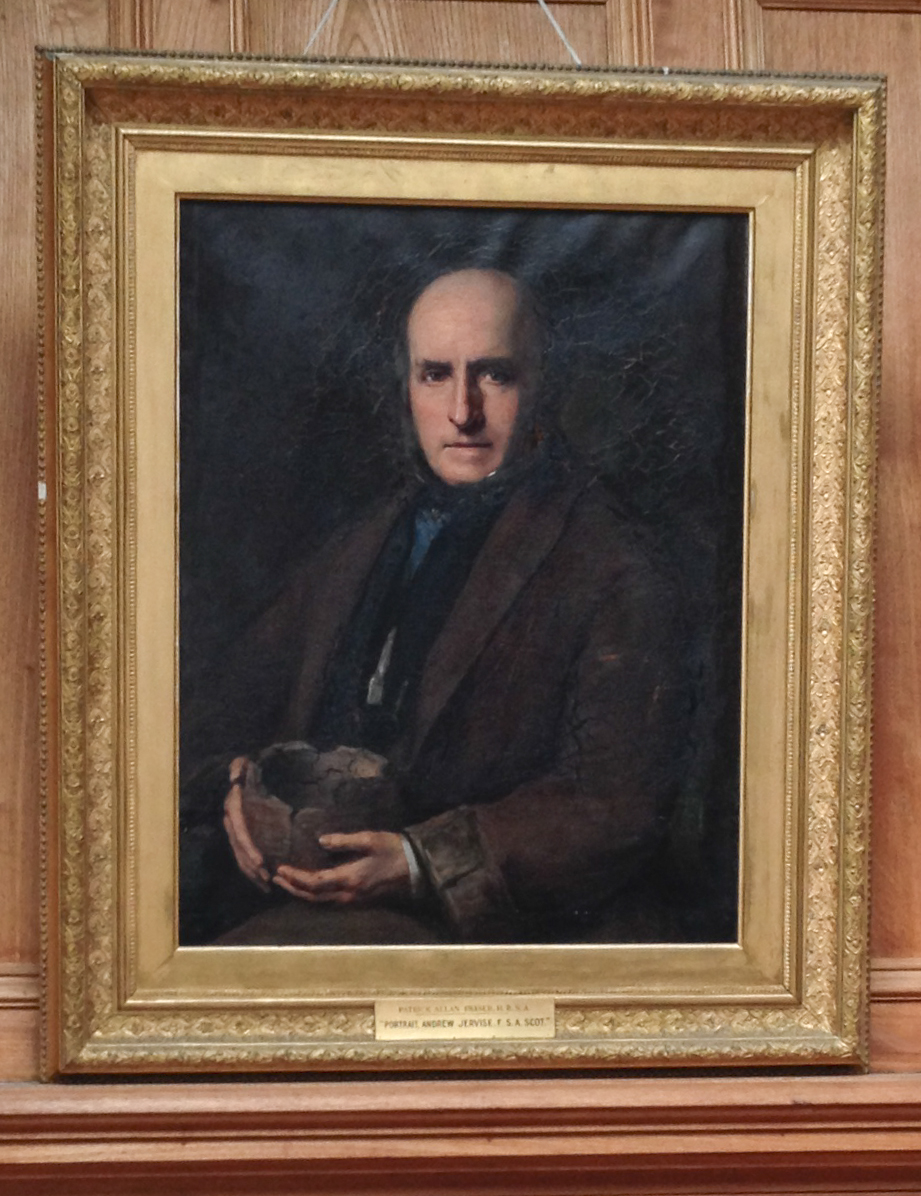
Andrew Jervise as painted by Patrick Allan-Fraser

== Life ==
Born 28 July 1820 at Brechin, Forfarshire, he was the son of Jean Chalmers, a nurseryman's daughter, and with her he lived all his life. Leaving school at age 11, he became a compositor, and met Alexander Laing, the Brechin poet. Finishing his apprenticeship in 1837, he oscillated till 1841 between Brechin and Edinburgh, nominally a compositor, but taking up poetry and painting. After lessons in design and colour under Sir William Allan and Thomas Duncan from 1842 to 1845, he settled in Brechin as teacher of drawing. In 1847 he delivered three lectures in Brechin on the Popular History of Painting and its Principles.

In 1856 two patrons—Lord Panmure, whose birthday he had celebrated in verse (1847), and John Inglis Chalmers of Aldbar, Forfarshire, whose library he had catalogued—secured for Jervise the examinership of register created by the Registration of Births, Deaths and Marriages (Scotland) Act 1854. His duties involved travel through Fife, Forfar, Perth, Kincardine, and Aberdeen, and for a time also through Banff, Elgin, and Nairn.

Jervise collected broadsides and ballads. He died at Brechin 12 April 1878, four months before his mother.

== Works ==
Jervise began publishing specimens of churchyard poetry in the Montrose Standard in 1848. He wrote:

- Sketches of the History and Traditions of Glenesk, 1852, dedicated to Lord Panmure.
- History and Traditions of the Land of the Lindsays, 1853, prompted in part by the Earl of Crawford's recently published Lives of the Lindsays.
- Lectures on the Mearns and on Glamis.
- Memorials of Angus and the Mearns, 1861, an antiquarian work.
- Inscriptions from the Shields in the Trades Hall, Aberdeen, 1863.
- Inscriptions from the Burial Grounds of Brechin and Magdalen Chapel, 1864, reprinted from the Brechin Advertiser.
- Epitaphs and Inscriptions from Burial Grounds and Old Buildings in the North-east of Scotland, 1875, vol. i., revised from his newspaper contributions; (posthumously) 1879, vol. ii., formed of contributions to the Aberdeen Free Press, with a memoir by William Alexander of Aberdeen and the Rev. John Grant Michie.

Jervise contributed to the Transactions of the Antiquarian Society, and collected for newspaper articles inscriptions from churchyards, and general antiquarian information.

== Notes ==
Attribution

This article incorporates text from a publication now in the public domain: Lee, Sidney, ed. (1892). "Jervise, Andrew". Dictionary of National Biography. Vol. 29. London: Smith, Elder & Co.
