= La Friche =

Building in Marseille, France

Coordinates: 43°18′34″N 5°23′25″E

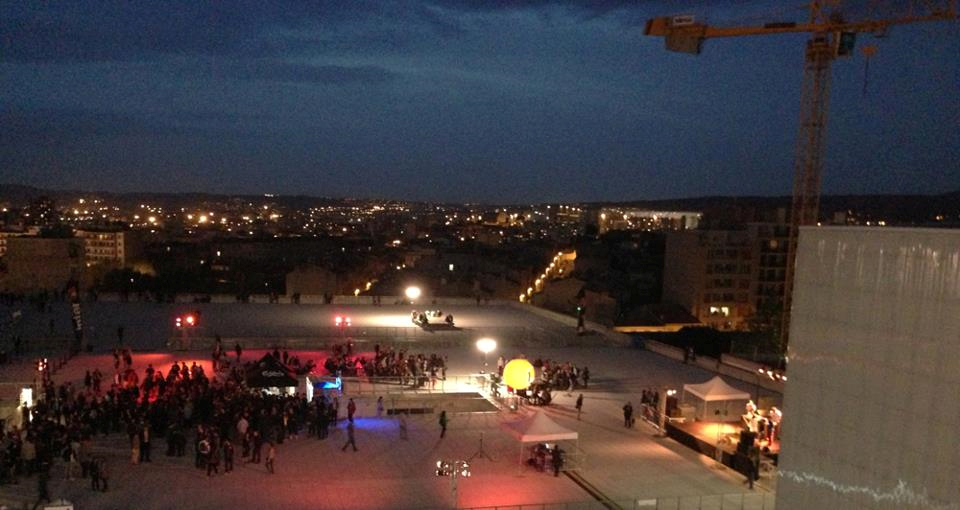
Night event on the terrasse of the Friche

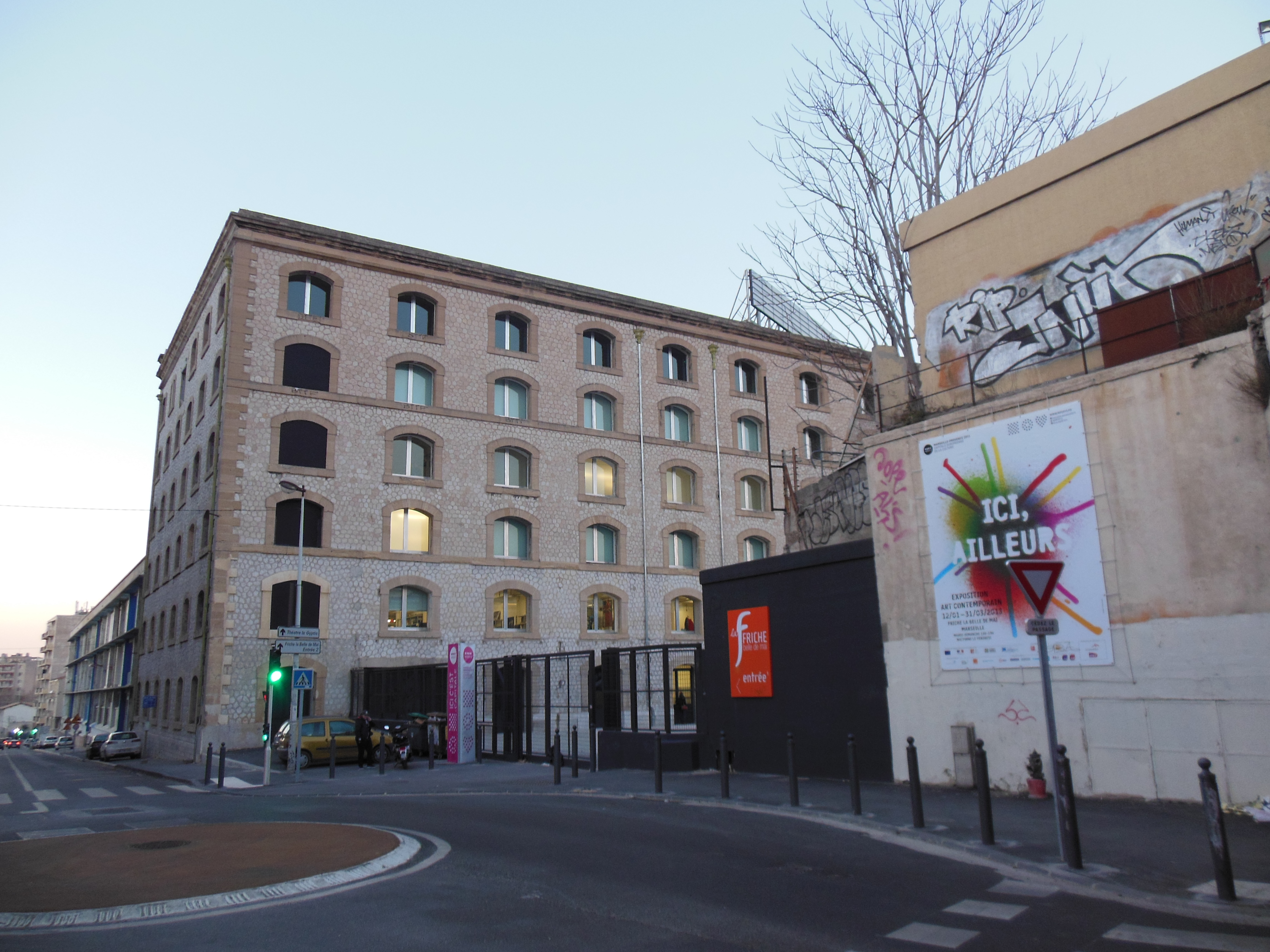
Entrance of the Friche

La Friche de la Belle de Mai or La Friche (English: The Fallow; The Wasteland; Occitan: La Fricha) is a former tobacco factory near the Saint-Charles station in Marseille, France, in the neighbourhood of Belle de Mai.

In 1992, it was converted into a cultural complex. Presenting itself as a "pole of authors," the Wasteland focuses its efforts primarily on the creation and production of works. It hosts dozens of international artists in residence and it contains over sixty artistic and cultural structures of all disciplines (theater, dance, music, contemporary art, radio). It is also a place of spectacle and broadcasting, it contains 2 concert rooms (Le cabaret aléatoire, 900 places, and La cartonnerie, 1,200 places), it hosted several times the electronic and urban music festival Marsatac. La Friche includes as well a restaurant, a nursery, a playground for children, a library, a local food market, a skate shop, a skate park, family and community gardens and two new theaters. The Mediterranean Institute of Show Crafts will open there in 2014.

In 2013 was built the Panorama Tower, for the European Capital of Culture, a 4,000 m^{2} exhibition space dedicated to contemporary art. In the same time, 7,500 m^{2} of the building "Les Magazins" were renovated and host offices and art studios. A large public terrasse (8,000 m^{2}) has been created on the roof of the building and regularly hosts events and dj sets.
