= Hospitalfield House =

Arts centre in Arbroath, Angus, Scotland

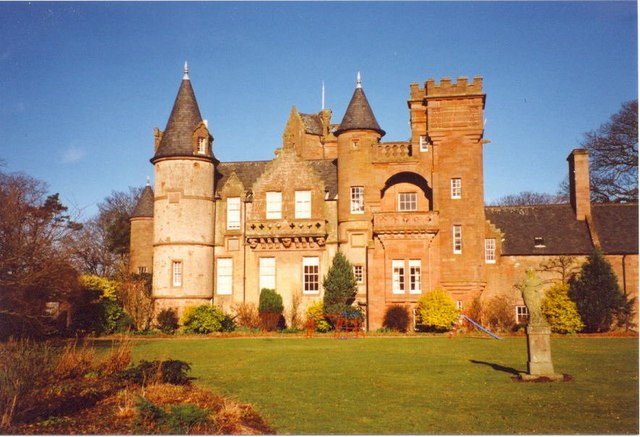

- Location within Angus

General information
- Architectural style: Scots baronial
- Location: Arbroath, Angus, Scotland
- Coordinates: 56.555972°N 2.617848°W
- Renovated: Mid-19th century
- Client: Elizabeth Fraser and Patrick Allan-Fraser

Website
- hospitalfield.org.uk

Hospitalfield House is an arts centre and historic house in Arbroath, Angus, Scotland, regarded as "one of the finest country houses in Scotland". It is believed to be "Scotland's first school of fine art" and the first art college in Britain. It is a registered charity under Scottish law. A range of prominent Scottish artists have worked there, including Joan Eardley, Peter Howson, Will Maclean, Robert Colquhoun, Robert MacBryde, William Gear, Alasdair Gray, Wendy McMurdo, and Callum Innes.

== Early history ==
A hospital was founded on the site in the 13th century by monks from nearby Arbroath Abbey as a leprosy and plague hospice called the Hospital of St John the Baptist. The property was purchased by the Reverend James Fraser around 1664 and was subsequently owned by successive generations of the Fraser family. Walter Scott visited the house in 1813, and he used it as the model for "Monkbarns" in his novel The Antiquary (1816).

== 19th century ==
The last Fraser to own the property was the wealthy heiress Elizabeth Fraser (1805–1873). In 1843, she married Scottish artist Patrick Allan, who later added the Fraser surname to his and became known as Patrick Allan-Fraser. The son of an Arbroath weaving merchant, he had studied art in Edinburgh and became a painter. In 1842, he had been commissioned to do a series of illustrations for an edition of Scott's The Antiquary. While carrying out this work, he had visited Hospitalfield House that year and met Elizabeth Fraser, who was a widow eight years his senior, and they were married the following year.

Together, they embarked on substantial remodelling of Hospitalfield House. The renovations used mainly local craftsmen and converted an 18th-century barn into a gallery, added a five-storey bartizan and a large wing. He had a keen interest in the arts and set up the Patrick Allan-Fraser of Hospitalfield Trust to support young artists. Hospitalfield House was bequeathed "for the promotion of Education in the Arts" upon the death of Allan-Fraser in 1890, there being no heirs to his estate.

== Present day ==
The building is now a residential art centre, music and conference venue. It is open to the public for four open weekends per year and for other events, including afternoon tours on the first Wednesday of each month.

In 2008, it was used as a film location for the docu-drama "Children of the Dead End", starring Stephen Rea.

In 2015, Hospitalfield curated and organised Graham Fagen's exhibition for Scotland + Venice, a collateral event of the 56th International Art Exhibition – La Biennale di Venezia.

== Architecture ==
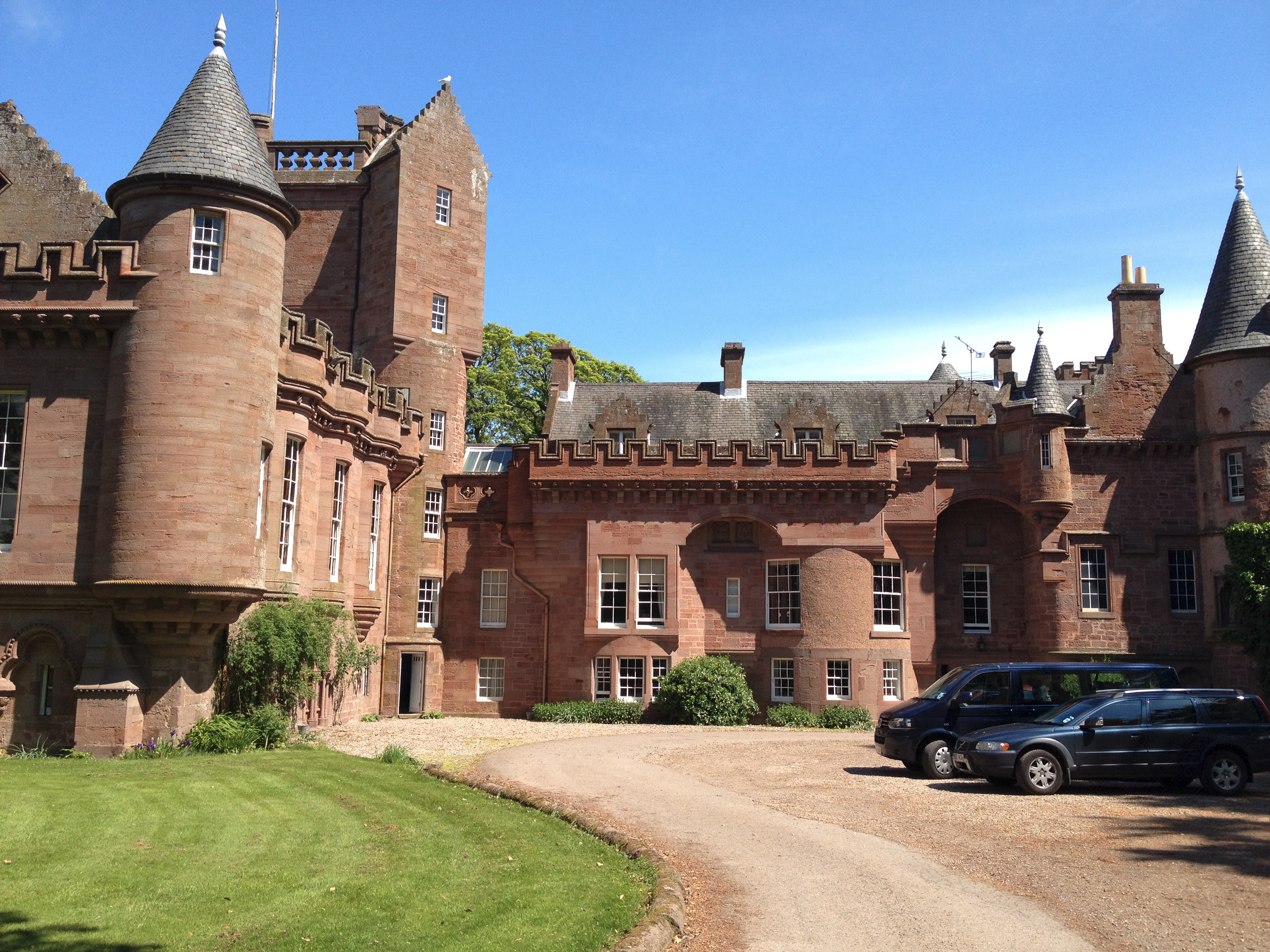
Hospitalfield House

=== Exterior ===
The red sandstone building is in the Gothic style and draws on medieval domestic architecture. Allan-Fraser was heavily indebted to the Arts and Crafts movement; this is evident in the design of the building, which features crenellated parapets, crow-stepped gables and oriel windows. In 1901, a new studio block was added with north-west facing windows. A smaller room contains a skylight, and there are yards for outdoor sculpture.

=== Interior ===
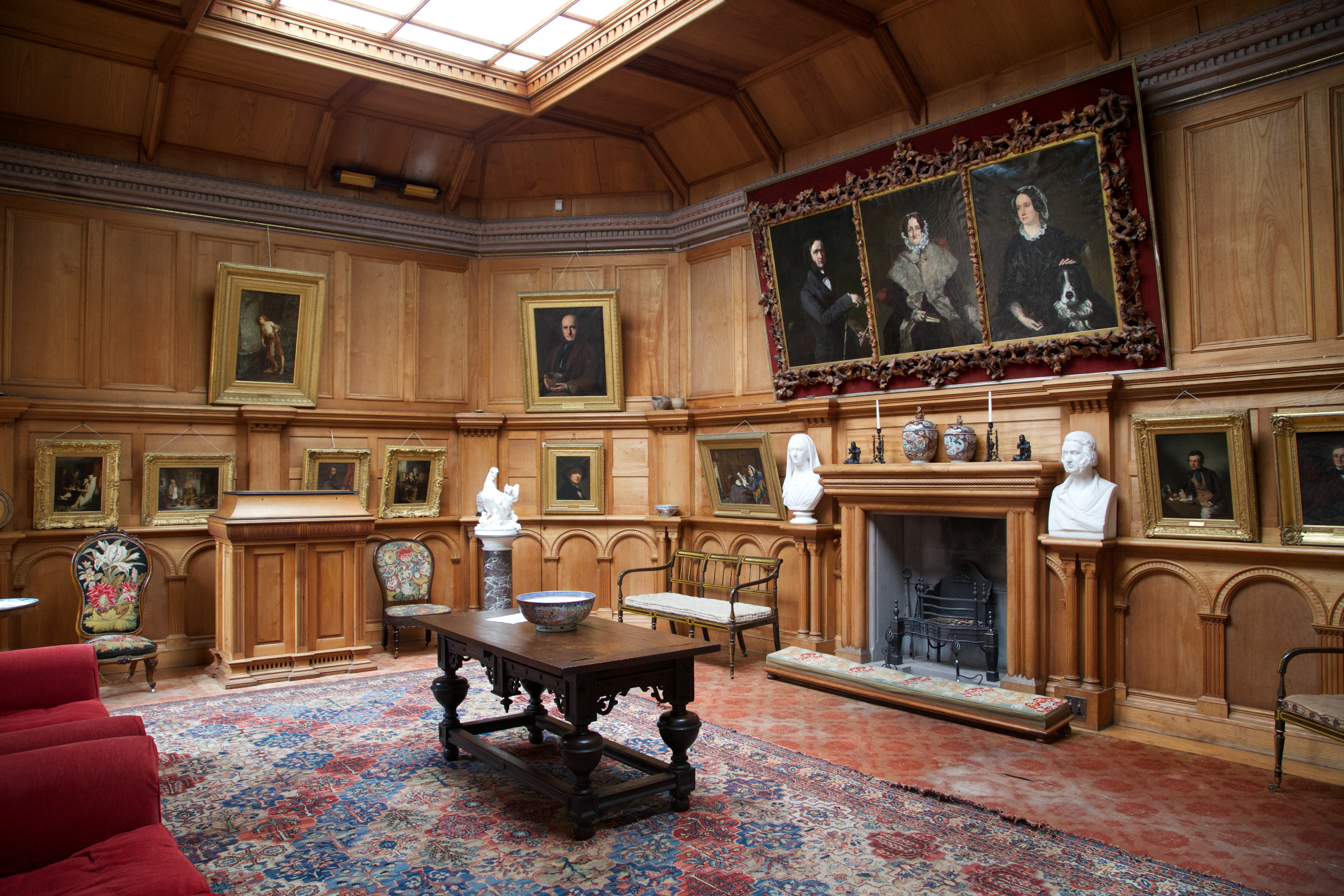
The cedar room

Allan-Fraser wanted to create an inspiring space for young artists, and the interior displays a large collection of Victorian sculpture, paintings, and wood-carvings which are of "international importance". The interior design features include Romanesque dado arcading and a hammerbeam roof.

The main public rooms in the house are the dining room, picture gallery and adjoining cedar room and anteroom. Two 17th-century tapestries were obtained in the 1870s for the first floor drawing room to reflect a passage in The Antiquary. Chandeliers inside the house were obtained from the Guildhall in Birmingham. The gallery contains armorial references to the Fraser family, who owned the estate from 1664, and the Parrott family of Hawkesbury Hall, who joined the Fraser estate in the 19th century.

Allan-Fraser commissioned self-portraits from members of The Clique, an art group he had known as a young man. These included John Phillip, Augustus Egg, William Powell Frith, Henry O'Neil, and Edward Matthew Ward. The Trial of Effie Deans (1840) by Robert Scott Lauder hangs on the main landing. A painting of Elizabeth Bowes-Lyon by James Peter Quinn hung in Hospitalfield's gallery during the Second World War. The library contains books dating from 16th to 19th centuries.

== Gallery ==
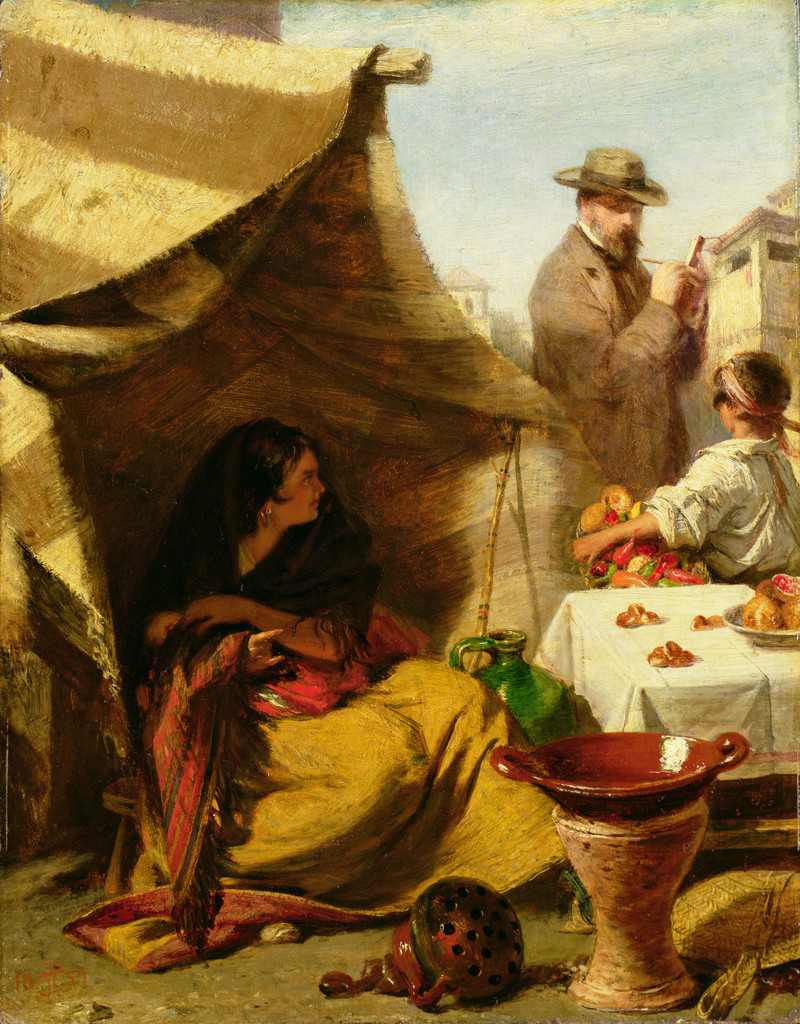
The Evil Eye self-portrait by John Phillip (1859), depicting the artist sketching a Spanish gyspy who is threatened by his gaze.

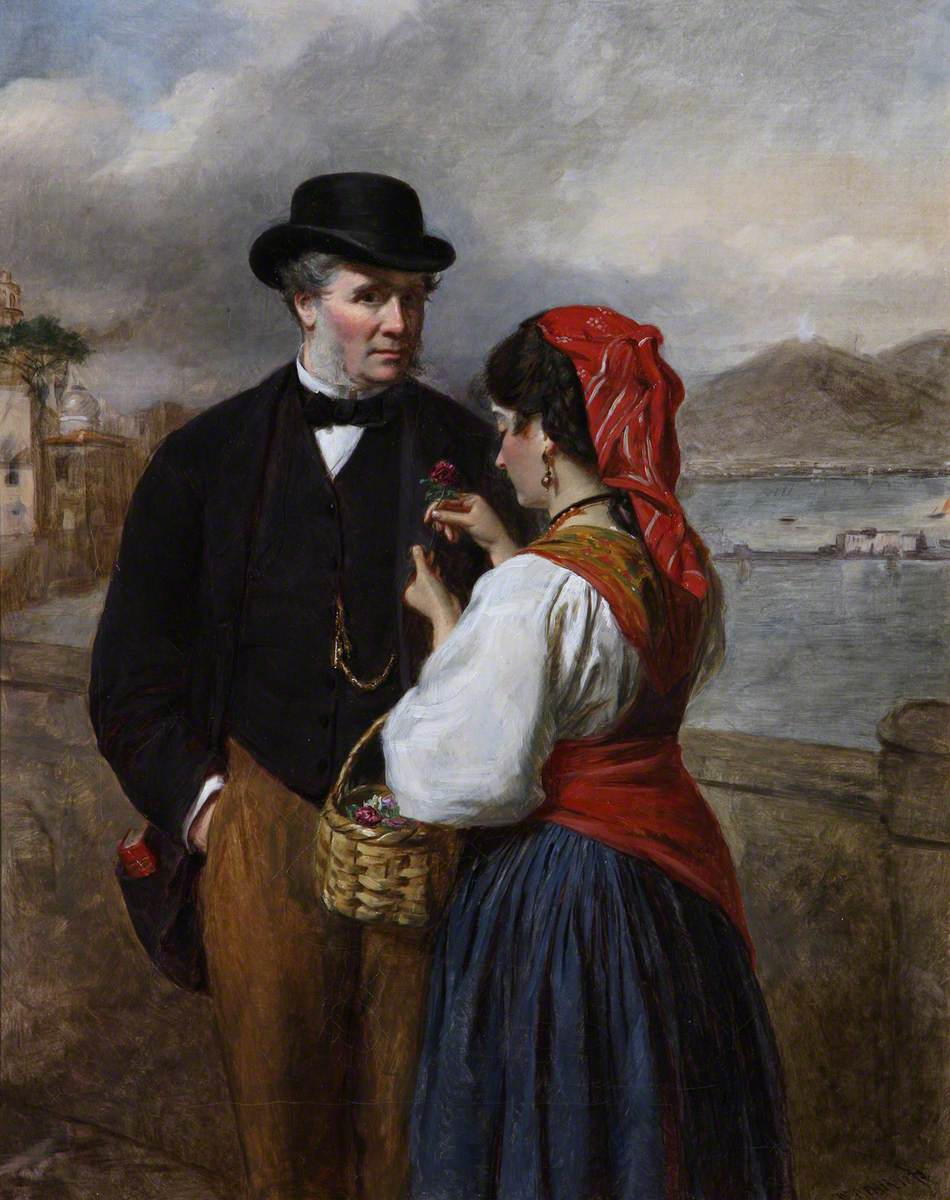
In Naples, Portrait of the Artist by William Powell Frith (1875)

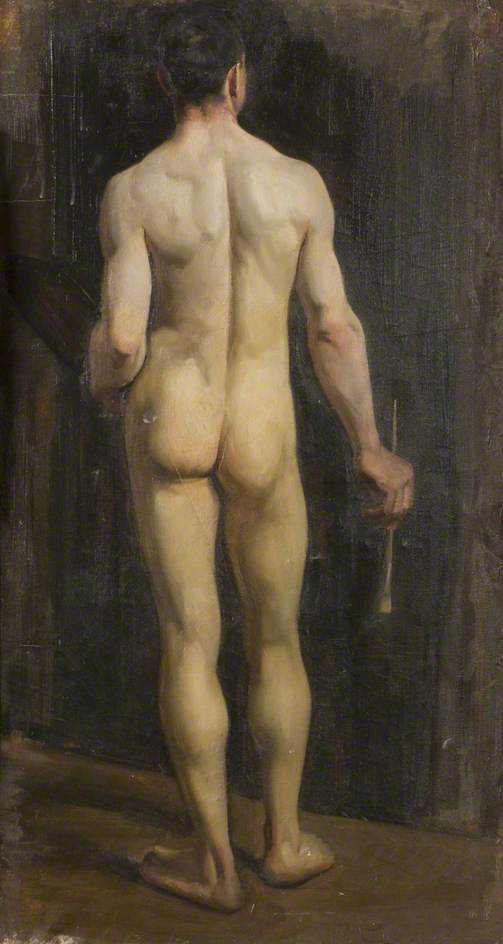
Standing Nude with a Paintbrush

== Bibliography ==
- D. E. Easson, Medieval religious houses, Scotland: with an appendix on the houses in the Isle of Man, (Longmans Green, 1957)
- D. Miller, Arbroath and its abbey; or, The early history of the town and abbey of Aberbrothock: including notices of ecclesiastical and other antiquities in the surrounding district, (Edinburgh, 1860)
- A.T. Simpson and S. Stevenson, "Historic Arbroath: the archaeological implications of development", (Glasgow Dept of Archaeology, 1982)
- B. Walker and G. Ritchie, Exploring Scotland's heritage: Fife, Perthshire and Angus, (H.M.S.O., 1996)
