= Hospital of St John the Baptist, Winchester =

Hospital of St John the Baptist
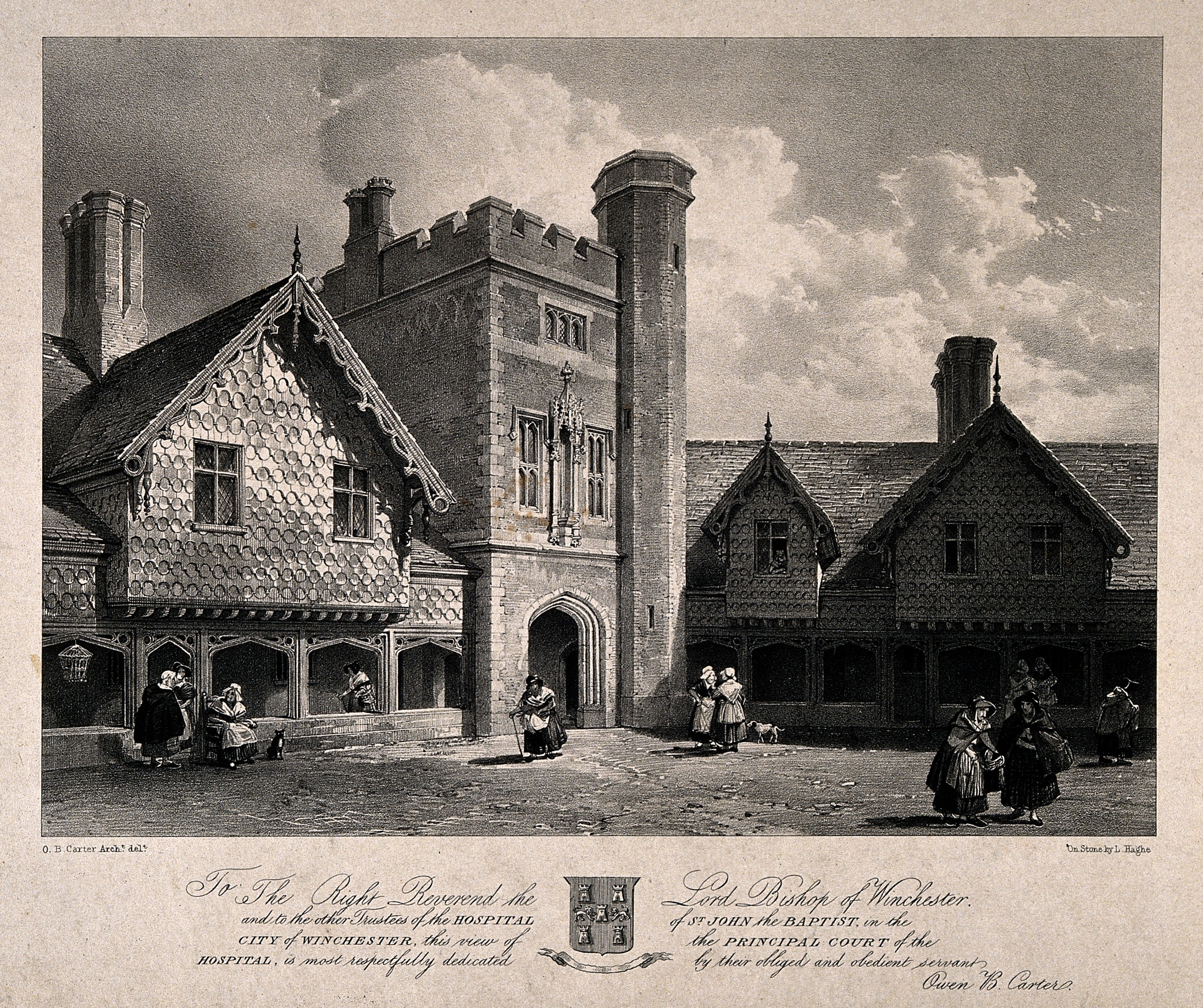

Geography
- Location: Winchester, England, United Kingdom

History
- Founded: 1085

Links
- Lists: Hospitals in England

The Hospital of St John the Baptist is a charitable foundation in Winchester, Hampshire, England, and the building itself was an almshouse established in 1085.
