= Patrick Allan Fraser =

Scottish painter and architect

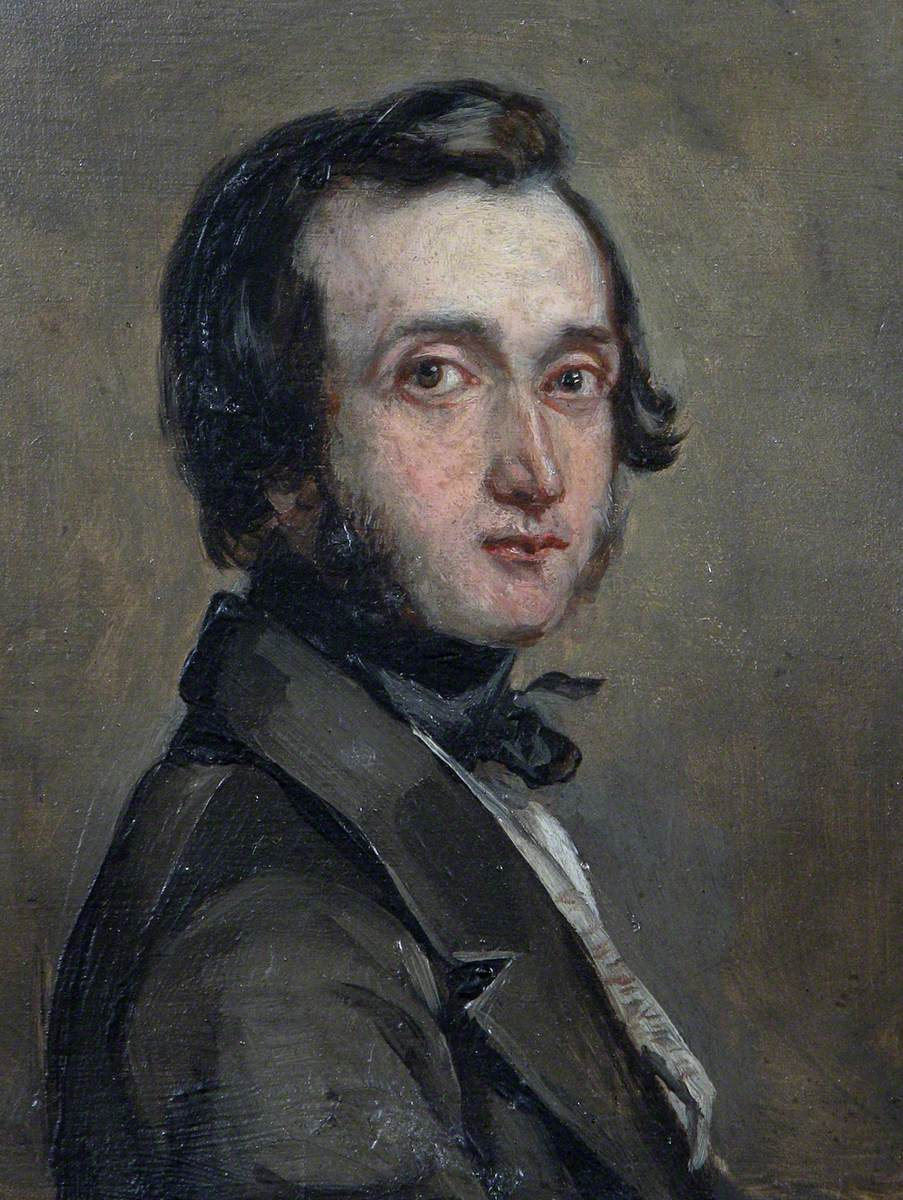
Self-portrait

Patrick Allan Fraser HRSA (born Patrick Allan; 1813 – 1890) was a Scottish painter and architect.

== Biography ==
Allan was born in Arbroath in 1813, a son of weaving merchant Robert Allan. He began training as a solicitor but was then indentured in his grandfather's house-painting business, and was encouraged to study at the Trustees' Academy at the end of his apprenticeship. There he met Robert Scott Lauder and accompanied him to Rome in the mid-1830s. The Lauders returned to Scotland in 1838 but Fraser settled for a time in Paris, painting views of the city. He was back in Arbroath by 1839, but then settled in London.

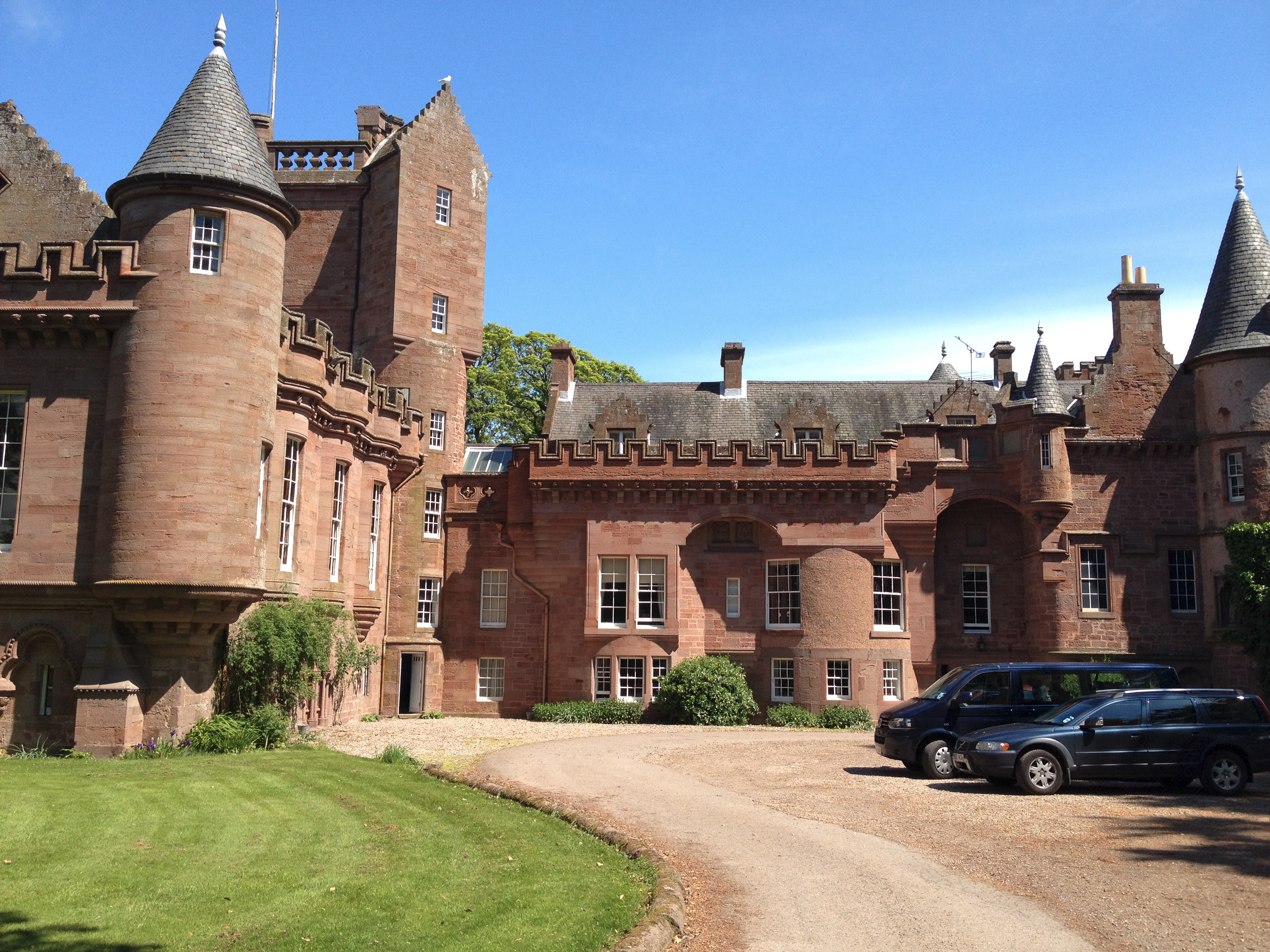
Hospitalfield House, Arbroath

Allan returned to Arbroath in 1842 on the invitation of the Edinburgh publisher Cadell, who wanted him to illustrate a new edition of Walter Scott's The Antiquary; however, the edition was never published. In 1843, Allan married heiress Elizabeth Fraser and took her name. Together they remodelled Hospitalfield House; the scheme used mainly local craftsmen and converted an eighteenth-century barn into a gallery, added a five-storey bartizan and a large wing. In 1856 the Frasers began the renovation of the Blackcraig Castle estate in Strathardle. Patrick became an architect and supervised the renovation himself. He commissioned portraits of members of The Clique group of English artists for Hospitalfield.

After his wife's death in 1873, he built a mausoleum in her name, the Fraser Mortuary Chapel in Western Cemetery, Arbroath. The Mortuary Chapel has been a Category A listed building since 1997.

In 1873, he moved to Rome and was elected president of the British Academy of Arts in Rome. He died, childless, on 17 September 1890. He endowed the Patrick Allan-Fraser of Hospitalfield Trust to establish Hospitalfield House as an art college "for the assistance and encouragement of young men not having means of their own who shall be desirous of following up one or more of the professions of painting, sculpture, carving in wood, architecture and engraving."

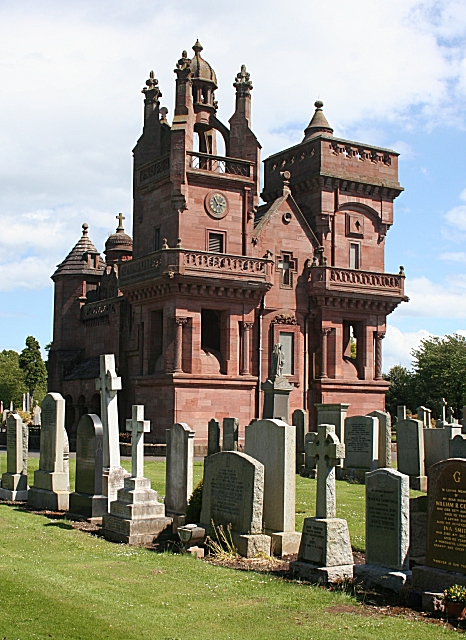
The Fraser Mortuary Chapel in Arbroath that he built for his wife

== Style ==
Fraser's architectural style was described in his lecture "Architecture With Special Reference to Local Buildings", which was published in The Building Chronicle issue of May 1854 as "Amateur Criticism of Architectural Works". He put great stress on building economically and morally, notions that were expounded in his 1861 work An Unpopular View of Our Times.
